= List of writers by name: M =

The following is a List of writers by name whose last names begin with M:

Abbreviations: ch = children's; d = drama, screenwriting; f = fiction; nf = non-fiction; p = poetry, song lyrics

== Ma ==
- Ma Duanlin (馬端臨, 1245–1322, China, nf)
- Ma Jian (馬建, born 1953, China, f/p/nf)
- Ma Rong (馬融, 79–166 CE, China, f/nf)
- Ma Zhiyuan (馬致遠, c. 1250–1321, China, p/d)
- Amin Maalouf (born 1949, Lebanon/France, f/nf/d)
- Dada Masiti (c. 1810s-15 July 1919, Kenya, p)
- Paul Maar (born 1937, Germany, ch)
- Rozena Maart (born 1962, S Africa, nf)
- Alain Mabanckou (born 1966, Republic of the Congo, f/p/nf)
- Ignatius Mabasa (born 1971, S Rhodesia/Zimbabwe, f/p)
- Richard Mabey (born 1941, England, nf)
- Shukri Mabkhout (born 1962, Tunisia, nf/f)
- Darko Macan (born 1966, Yugoslavia/Croatia, nf/f)
- Frederick Macartney (1887–1980, Australia, p/nf)
- Rose Macaulay (1881–1958, England, f/nf)
- Thomas Babington Macaulay (1800–1859, England/Scotland, nf)
- George MacBeth (1932–1992, Scotland/Ireland, p/f)
- Norman MacCaig (1910–1996, Scotland, p)
- Fiona MacCarthy (1940–2020, England, nf)
- Hugh MacDiarmid (1892–1978, Scotland, p), pseudonym of Christopher Murray Grieve
- Amy MacDonald (born 1951, US, ch)
- Ann-Marie MacDonald (born 1958, Canada, d/f)
- Betty MacDonald (1908–1958, US, f/ch)
- Charlotte Macdonald (born 1950, N Zealand, nf)
- Elizabeth Roberts MacDonald (1864–1922, Canada, p/ch/f/nf)
- George MacDonald (1824–1905, Scotland/England, nf/ch)
- Helen Macdonald (born 1970, England, p)
- John D. MacDonald (1916–1986, US, f)
- António de Macedo (1931–2017, Portugal, nf/f/d)
- Joaquim Manuel de Macedo (1820–1882, Brazil, f/p/d)
- Alexandru Macedonski (1854–1920, Wallachia/Romania, p/f/d)
- Vytautas Mačernis (1921–1944, Lithuania, p)
- Gwendolyn MacEwen (1941–1987, Canada, p/f)
- Rebecca Macfie (living, N Zealand, nf)
- Marjorie Oludhe Macgoye (1928–2015, England/Kenya, p/f)
- Alasdair Alpin MacGregor (1899–1970, Scotland/England, nf/p)
- Charles MacGregor (1840–1887, India, nf)
- Ellen MacGregor (1906–1954, US, ch)
- Reginald James MacGregor (1887–1961, England, ch/d)
- Ana Maria Machado (born 1941, Brazil, ch)
- Aníbal Machado (1894–1964, Brazil, f)
- Antonio Machado (1875–1939, Spain/France, p)
- Antônio Castilho de Alcântara Machado (1901–1935, Brazil, f/nf)
- D. J. MacHale (born 1955, US, d/ch)
- Guillaume de Machaut (c. 1300–1377, France, p)
- Mukhran Machavariani (1929–2010, USSR/Georgia, p)
- Arthur Machen (1863–1947, Wales/England, f/nf), pseudonym of Arthur Llewellyn Jones
- Ben Macintyre (born 1963, England, nf)
- Duncan Ban MacIntyre (1724–1812, Scotland, p)
- Elisabeth MacIntyre (1916–2004, Australia, ch/f)
- Louise Mack (1870–1935, Australia, f/p/nf)
- Denis Mackail (1892–1971, England, f/nf)
- Jessie Mackay (1864–1938, N Zealand, p)
- John Henry Mackay (1864–1933, Scotland/Germany, nf)
- Katrine Mackay (1864–1944, Australia/N Zealand, nf)
- Shena Mackay (born 1944, Scotland/England, f)
- Dorothea Mackellar (1885–1968, Australia, p/f)
- Anna Mackenzie (born 1963, N Zealand, p)
- Compton Mackenzie (1883–1972, England/Scotland, f/nf)
- Henry Mackenzie (1745–1831, Scotland, f/nf)
- Kenneth Mackenzie (1913–1955, Australia, p/f)
- Serena Mackesy (born 1960s, England, f/nf)
- Mary Mackie (born early 1940s, England, f/nf)
- Józef Mackiewicz (1902–1985, Russian E/Germany, f/nf)
- Stanisław Mackiewicz (1896–1966, Russian E/Poland, nf)
- Alasdair Maclean (1926–1994, Scotland, p/nf)
- Patricia MacLachlan (1938–2022, US, ch)
- Fitzroy Maclean (1911–1996, Italy/England, nf)
- Hester Maclean (1859–1932, Australia/N Zealand, nf)
- Ida Maclean (1877–1944, England, nf)
- Katherine MacLean (1925–2019, US, f)
- Sorley MacLean (1911–1996, Scotland, p)
- Archibald MacLeish (1892–1982, US, p/nf/d)
- Charlotte MacLeod (1922–2005, Canada/US, f)
- Della Campbell MacLeod (ca. 1884 – 1921, US, f/nf)
- Ian R. MacLeod (born 1956, England, f)
- Ken MacLeod (born 1954, Scotland, f)
- Sarah Broom Macnaughtan (1864–1916, Scotland/England, f/nf)
- Aonghas MacNeacail (1942–2022, Scotland, p/d)
- Louis MacNeice (1907–1963, N Ireland/England, p/d)
- Hector Macneill (1746–1818, Scotland, p)
- Debbie Macomber (born 1948, US, f)
- James Macpherson (1736–1796, Scotland, p)
- Myra MacPherson (1934–2026, US, nf)
- Katharine Sarah Macquoid (1824–1917, England, f/nf)
- Nevil Macready (1862–1946, England, nf)
- Angus MacVicar (1908–2001, Scotland, f/nf/ch)
- Imre Madách (1823–1864, Hungary, d/p)
- Judith Madan (1702–1781, England, p)
- Martin Madan (1726–1790, England, nf)
- Shirley Maddock (1928–2001, N Zealand, nf/f)
- Maddox (born 1978, US, nf), pseudonym of George Ouzounian
- Brenda Maddox (1932–2019, US/England, nf)
- Bronwen Maddox (born 1963, England, nf)
- Yulisa Pat Amadu Maddy (1936–2014, Sierra Leone, d)
- Naomi Long Madgett (1923–2020, US, p)
- Gajanan Digambar Madgulkar (1919–1977, India, p/f/nf)
- Haki R. Madhubuti (born 1942, US, p/nf), born Don Luther Lee
- E. S. Madima (living, S Africa, f)
- Tenda Madima (living, S Africa, f/p)
- Richard Madox (1546–1583, England/Brazil, nf)
- Valter hugo mãe (born 1971, Angola/Portugal, f), pseudonym of Valter Hugo Lemos
- Jun Maeda (麻枝准, born 1975, Japan, f)
- Maurice Maeterlinck (1862–1949, Belgium/France, d/p/nf)
- Yutaka Mafune (真船豊, 1902–1977, Japan, d/f)
- Modison Salayedvwa Magagula (born 1958, Swaziland, d/p/f)
- Lina Magaia (1940–2011, Mozambique, nf/f)
- Bogomir Magajna (1904–1963, Austrian E/Yugoslavia, f/ch)
- Álvaro Magalhães (born 1951, Portugal, f/ch)
- Gonçalves de Magalhães, 1811–1882, Brazil, p/d/nf)
- Georgije Magarašević (1793–1830, Serbia, nf/d)
- Maga Magazinović (1882–1968, Serbia/Yugoslavia, nf)
- John Gillespie Magee Jr. (1922–1941, China/England, p)
- Ragnhild Magerøy (1920–2010, Norway, f/nf/p)
- Andri Snær Magnason (born 1973, Iceland, f/p/d)
- Guðrún Kristín Magnúsdóttir (born 1939, Iceland, ch/nf)
- Þórunn Elfa Magnúsdóttir (1910–1995, Iceland, f)
- Finnur Magnússon (1781–1847, Iceland/Denmark, nf)
- Jón Magnússon (c. 1610–1696, Iceland, nf)
- Magnus Magnusson (1929–2007, Iceland/Scotland, nf)
- Sindiwe Magona (born 1943, S Africa, f/nf)
- David Magradze (born 1962, USSR/Georgia, p)
- Paul Magrs (born 1969, England, f/d/nf)
- Sandra Magsamen (born 1959, US, ch)
- João Magueijo (born 1967, Portugal, nf)
- Gregory Maguire (born 1954, US, f)
- Wiseman Magwa (born 1962, S Rhodesia/Zimbabwe, d)
- Akka Mahadevi (fl. 12th c., India, p)
- John Mahama (born 1958, Ghana, nf)
- Jayanta Mahapatra (1928–2023, India, p/f/nf)
- Maryam Mahboob (born 1955, Afghanistan/Canada, f)
- Naguib Mahfouz (1911–2006, Egypt, f/d)
- Muhammad Ahmad Mahgoub (1908–1976, Sudan, p/nf)
- Jamal Mahjoub (born 1966, England, f)
- Abdel Khaliq Mahjub (1927–1971, Sudan, nf)
- Sanam Mahloudji (living, Iran, f)
- Ahmad Mahmoud (1931–2002, Iran, f/nf)
- Mustafa Mahmoud (1921–2009, Egypt, nf)
- Zaki Naguib Mahmoud (1905–1993, Egypt, nf)
- Al Mahmud (1936–2019, India/Bangladesh, p/f)
- Derek Mahon (1941–2020, N Ireland/Ireland, p/nf)
- Ahmed Mahsas (1923–2013, Algeria, nf)
- Margaret Mahy (1936–2012, N Zealand, f/ch)
- Jennifer Maiden (born 1949, Australia, p/f/nf)
- Ōtarō Maijō (舞城王太郎, born 1973, Japan, f)
- Norman Mailer (1923–2007, US, f/nf/d)
- Ella Maillart (1903–1997, Switzerland, nf)
- Arthur Maimane (1932–2005, S Africa, nf/f)
- Guru Prasad Mainali (1900–1971, Nepal, f)
- Sankie Maimo (1930–2013, Cameroon/Nigeria, d/cg)
- Barbara York Main (1929–2019, Australia, nf)
- Maironis (1862–1932, Russian E/Lithuania, p)
- Rudolf Maister (1874–1934, Austria-Hungary/Yugoslavia, p)
- Karen Maitland (born 1956, England, f)
- Sara Maitland (born 1950, England, f)
- Pierre des Maizeaux (1666 or 1673–1745, France/England, nf)
- Adewale Maja-Pearce (born 1953, England/Nigeria, nf/f)
- Jorge Majfud (born 1969, Uruguay/US, f/nf)
- János Majláth (1786–1855, Austrian E/Hungary, nf/p)
- Clarence Major (born 1936, US, p/f)
- Lamia Makaddam (born 1971, Tunisia, p/nf)
- Svetlana Makarovič (born 1939, Yugoslavia/Slovenia, nf/p/ch)
- Barbara Makhalisa (born 1949, S Rhodesia/Zimbabwe, f/nf/p)
- Angela Makholwa (living, S Africa, f)
- Nick Makoha (living, Ugandan/England, p/d)
- Desanka Maksimović (1898–1993, Serbia/Yugoslavia, p/ch)
- Mohammed bin Rashid Al Maktoum (born 1949, Dubai, nf/p)
- Jennifer Nansubuga Makumbi (born 1960s, Uganda/England, f)
- Vitan Mal (born 1946, Yugoslavia/Slovenia, ch/f)
- Grand Corps Malade (born 1977, France, p), pseudonym of Fabien Marsaud
- Rian Malan (born 1954, S Africa, nf/p)
- Curzio Malaparte (1898–1957, Italy, nf)
- Antoni Malczewski (1793–1826, Russian E, p)
- Emilie Monson Malcolm (c. 1830–1905, N Zealand, nf)
- Tomás Maldonado (1922–2018, Argentina, nf)
- Edmond Amran El Maleh (1917–2010, Morocco/France, nf)
- Marcin Malek (born 1975, Poland, p/d)
- Rosie Malek-Yonan (born 1965, Iran/US, nf)
- Vlado Maleski (1919–1984, Yugoslavia, f)
- Oriel Malet (1823–1914, Wales/France, f/nf), pseudonym of Lady Auriel Rosemary Malet Vaughan
- Djordje Maletić (1816–1888, Austrian E/Serbia, p/nf)
- Qabaniso Malewezi (born 1979, Malawi, p)
- François de Malherbe (1555–1628, France, p/nf)
- Rajiv Malhotra (born 1950, India/US, nf)
- Josh Malihabadi (1898–1982, India/Pakistan, p)
- Ashesh Malla (born 1954, Nepal, d)
- Madayyagari Mallana (fl. 15th c., Rayalaseema/Vijayanagara E, p)
- Stéphane Mallarmé (1842–1898, France, p/nf)
- Gitta Mallasz (1907–1992, Hungary/France, nf)
- Eduardo Mallea (1903–1982, Argentina, f/nf)
- Susan Mallery (born 1950, US, f)
- David Mallet (c. 1705–1765, Scotland, p/d)
- Tom Mallin (1927–1977, England, f/d)
- Allan Mallinson (born 1949, England, f/nf)
- Francis Mallmann (born 1956, Argentina, nf)
- Agustín Fernández Mallo (born 1967, Spain, p/f/nf)
- Clare Mallory (1913–1991, N Zealand, ch), pseudonym of Winifred Constance McQuilkan Hall
- Bertil Malmberg (1889–1958, Sweden, f/p)
- Bodil Malmsten (1944–2016, Sweden, p/f)
- Thomas Malory (c. 1415–1471, England, p/f)
- Hector Malot (1830–1907, France, nf/f)
- David Malouf (1934–2026, Australia, f/p/d)
- Eric Malpass (1910–1996, England, f)
- André Malraux (1901–1976, France, f/nf)
- Demetrio Aguilera Malta (1909–1981, Ecuador, nf)
- Barry N. Malzberg (1939–2024, US, f)
- Benedicto Wokomaatani Malunga (born 1962, Malawi, p)
- Amina Mama (born 1958, Nigeria/US, nf)
- Abdoulaye Mamani (1932–1993, Niger, p/f)
- Mahmood Mamdani (born 1946, India/Uganda, nf)
- Goffredo Mameli (1827–1849, Italy, p/nf)
- Mouloud Mammeri (1917–1989, Algeria, f/d/nf)
- Magda Mamet (1916–2012, Mauritius, p)
- Razaq Mamoon (born 1964, Afghanistan/Australia, nf)
- Rania Mamoun (born 1979, Sudan, f/nf)
- William Manchester (1922–2004, US, nf)
- Andreas Mand (born 1959, Germany, f/nf/d)
- Shahriar Mandanipour (born 1957, Iran/US, nf)
- Nelson Mandela (1918–2013, S Africa, nf)
- Osip Mandelstam (1891–1938, Russia/USSR, p/nf)
- Jane Mander (1877–1949, N Zealand, f/nf)
- Miles Mander (1888–1946, England, d/f)
- John Mandeville (14th c., probably France/Netherlands, nf)
- Svetislav Mandić (1921–2003, Serbia/Montenegro, nf/p)
- Iván Mándy (1918–1995, Hungary, nf)
- Mustafa Lutfi al-Manfaluti (1876–1924, Egypt, f/d/p)
- James Clarence Mangan (1803–1849, Ireland, p)
- Patrick Mangeni (living, Uganda, p/d/ch)
- Richmal Mangnall (1769–1820, England, ch)
- Andrew Mango (1926–2014, Turkey/England, nf)
- Charles Mangua (1939–2021, Kenya, f)
- Bill Manhire (born 1946, N Zealand, p/f)
- Rani Manicka (living, Malaysia, f)
- John Manifold (1915–1985, Australia, p/nf)
- Marcus Manilius (fl. 1st c. CE, Roman E, p)
- Frederick Edward Maning (1812–1883, N Zealand, nf)
- Irshad Manji (born 1968, Uganda/Canada, nf)
- Henning Mankell (1948–2015, Sweden, f/ch/d)
- Guy Mankowski (born 1983, England, f/nf)
- Delarivier Manley (1663 or c. 1670–1724, England, nf/d)
- Alana Mann (living, Australia, nf)
- Erika Mann (1905–1969, Germany/Switzerland, nf)
- Golo Mann (1909–1994, Germany/Switzerland, nf)
- Heinrich Mann (1871–1950, Germany/US, f)
- Klaus Mann (1906–1949, Germany/France, f/nf)
- Leonard Mann (1895–1981, Australia, p/f)
- Mary E. Mann (1848–1929, England, f/d)
- Phillip Mann (1942–2022, England/N Zealand, f)
- Thomas Mann (1875–1955, Germany/Switzerland, f/nf)
- Anne Manning (1807–1879, England, f)
- Emily Manning (1845–1890, Australia, nf), pseudonym Australie
- Frederic Manning (1882–1935, England, f/p)
- Laurence Manning (1899–1972, Canada, f)
- Lauren Manning (born 1961, US, nf)
- Maurice Manning (born 1966, US, p)
- Richard Manning (born 1951, US, nf)
- Rosemary Manning (1911–1988, England, f)
- Ruth Manning-Sanders (1886–1988, Wales/England, p/ch)
- Daniel P. Mannix (1911–1997, US, f/nf)
- Robert Mannyng (1264–1340, England, nf)
- Todor Manojlović (1883–1968, Austria-Hungary/Yugoslavia, p/d/nf)
- Jaime Manrique (born 1949, Colombia/US, f/p/nf)
- Chris Mansell (born 1953, Australia, p/f/ch)
- Jill Mansell (living, England, f)
- Katherine Mansfield (1888–1923 N Zealand/France, f/p)
- Keith Mansfield (born 1965, England, f)
- Mark Manson (born 1984, US, nf)
- Anis Mansour (1924–2011, Egypt, nf)
- Latifa Ben Mansour (born 1950, Algeria, nf)
- Zahra Mansouri (living, Morocco, p)
- Muhammad Mansuruddin (1904–1987, India/Bangladesh, nf)
- Jakobe Mansztajn (born 1982, Poland, p/nf)
- Alicia Catherine Mant (1788–1869, England, ch)
- Hilary Mantel (1952–2022, England, f/nf)
- Saadat Hasan Manto (1912–1955, India/Pakistan, f/d/nf)
- Manuchehri ((fl. 1031–1040, Persia, p)
- Sarah Ladipo Manyika (born 1968, Nigeria/England, f/nf)
- Sonia Manzano (born 1950, US, ch)
- Alessandro Manzoni (1785–1873, Italy, p/f/nf)
- Mokbula Manzoor (1938–2020, India/Bangladesh, f/nf/ch)
- Mao Dun (茅盾, 1896–1981, China, nf/f/d)
- Jack Mapanje (1944–2026, Nyasaland/Malawi, p/nf)
- Carmen Marai (living, Chile, p/f)
- Sándor Márai (1900–1989, Hungary/US, f/nf/p)
- J. Nozipo Maraire (born 1964, S Rhodesia/Zimbabwe, f)
- Eugène Marais (1871–1936, S Africa, nf)
- René Maran (1887–1960, Martinique/France, p/f)
- Pierre de Marbeuf (1595–1645, France, p)
- Cristina Marcano (born 1960, Venezuela, nf)
- Marcel Marceau (1923–2007, France, nf)
- Frédéric Marcelin (1848–1917, Haiti, f/nf)
- Jane Marcet (1769–1858, England, nf)
- Ausiàs March (1400–1459, Valencia, p)
- Jill March (born 1950, US, f), pseudonym of Nora Roberts
- Melina Marchetta (born 1965, Australia, f/ch)
- Hans Marchwitza (1890–1965, Germany, f/nf/p)
- Justinas Marcinkevičius (1930–2011, Lithuania/Soviet Union, p/d)
- Ben Marcus (born 1967, US, f/nf)
- Morton Marcus (1936–2009, US, p)
- Sharon Marcus (born 1966, US, nf)
- Jan Marcussen (living, US, nf)
- Walter de la Mare (1873–1956), England, p/f/ch)
- Leopoldo Marechal (1900–1970, Argentina, p/f/nf)
- Dambudzo Marechera (1952–1987, S Rhodesia/Zimbabwe, f/d/p)
- Mareez (1917–1983, India, p/nf)
- Margaret of Valois-Angoulême (1492–1599, France, nf)
- Manuela Margarido (1925–2007, São Tomé and Príncipe/Portugal, p)
- Ingólfur Margeirsson (1948–2011, Iceland, nf)
- Leo Margulies (1900–1975, US, f)
- Giwi Margwelaschwili (1927–2020, Germany/Soviet Union, f/nf)
- Silvana De Mari (born 1953, Italy, f)
- Paul Mariani born 1940, US, p)
- Javier Marías (1951–2022, Spain, f/nf)
- José Carlos Mariátegui (1894–1930, Peru, nf)
- Marie de France (fl. 1160–1215, England, p)
- Juliet Marillier (born 1948, N Zealand, f)
- Katarina Marinčič (born 1968, Yugoslavia/Slovenia, f/nf)
- Karl von Marinelli (1745–1803, Austria, d)
- Filippo Tommaso Marinetti (1876–1944, Egypt/Italy, p/nf)
- Giambattista Marino (1569–1625, Italy, p)
- Pierre de Marivaux (1688–1763, France, d/f)
- Smilja Marjanović-Dušanić (born 1963, Yugoslavia/Serbia, nf)
- E. A. Markham (1939–2008, Montserrat/France, p/d/f)
- Edwin Markham (1852–1940, US, p)
- Liza Marklund (born 1962, Sweden, f)
- Béla Markó (born 1951, Romania, nf)
- Georgi Markov (1929–1978, Bulgaria/England, nf/f/d)
- Mihailo Marković (1923–2010, Yugoslavia/Serbia, nf)
- David Markson (1927–2010, US, f/p/nf)
- Stephen Marley (living, England, f)
- Christopher Marlowe (1564–1593, England, d)
- Deb Marlowe (living, US, f)
- Derek Marlowe (1938–1996, England, d/f)
- Paul Marlowe (living, Canada, f)
- José Mármol (1818–1871, Argentina, p)
- Philips of Marnix, Lord of Saint-Aldegonde (1540–1598, Flanders/Netherlands, nf/p)
- Igor Marojević (born 1968, Yugoslavia/Serbia, nf)
- Monika Maron (born 1941, Germany, f/nf)
- Clément Marot (1496–1544, France, p)
- Jean Marot (1463 – c. 1526, France, p)
- Leïla Marouane (born 1960, Tunisia/Algeria, f), pseudonym of Leyla Zineb Mechentel
- Abbas Maroufi (1957–2022, Iran/Germany, f/nf)
- Ana Marija Marović (1815–1887, Italy/Montenegro, f/nf)
- Rafael Marques (born 1971, Angola, nf)
- René Marqués (1919–1979, Puerto Rico, f/d)
- Anne de Marquets (c. 1533–1588, France, p)
- Gabriel García Márquez (1927–2014, Colombia, f/nf)
- Don Marquis (1878–1937, US, f/p/d)
- Damian Marrett (born 1967, Australia, nf)
- Janice Marriott (born 1946, England/N Zealand, p/nf)
- Augusta Marryat (1828–1899, England, ch)
- Emilia Marryat (1835–1875, England, f/ch)
- Florence Marryat (1833–1899, England, f/d)
- Frank Marryat (1826–1855, England, nf)
- Frederick Marryat (1792–1848, England, f/ch)
- Horace Marryat (1818–1887, England, nf)
- Adam Mars-Jones (born 1954, England, f/nf)
- John Marsden (1950–2024, Australia, ch/nf)
- John Howard Marsden (1803–1891, England, nf/p)
- Edward Garrard Marsh (1783–1862, England, p/nf)
- Geoffrey Marsh (1942–2006, US, f), pseudonym of Charles L. Grant
- Henry Marsh (born 1950, England, nf)
- Katherine Marsh (born 1974, US, ch/nf)
- Ngaio Marsh (1895–1982, N Zealand, f)
- Ronald James Marsh (1914–1987, England, f)
- Selina Tusitala Marsh (born 1971, N Zealand, p/f/ch)
- Agnes Marshall (1855–1905, England, nf)
- Bill Okyere Marshall (1933–2021, Ghana, d/f)
- Bruce Marshall (1899–1987, Scotland, f/nf)
- James Marshall (1942–1992, US, ch)
- Owen Marshall (born 1941, N Zealand, f)
- Paule Marshall (1929–2019, US, f)
- Adam Mars-Jones (born 1954, England, f/nf)
- Una Marson (1905–1965, Jamaica, p/d/nf)
- Trude Marstein (born 1973, Norway, f/nf/ch)
- John Marston (1576–1634, England, p/d/nf)
- Yann Martel (born 1963, Canada, f)
- Harald Martenstein (born 1953, Germany, f/nf)
- José Martí (1853–1895, Cuba, p/nf)
- Martial (c. 38–41 – c. 102–1904, Roman E, p), full name Marcus Valerius Martialis
- Andrew Martin (born 1962, England, f/nf)
- Ann M. Martin (born 1955, US, ch)
- Camille Martin (born 1956, US/Canada, p/nf)
- Catherine Edith Macauley Martin (1848–1937, Scotland/Australia, f/p)
- David Martin (1915–1997, Hungary/Australia, f/p/d), born Lajos Detsinyi
- Emily Winfield Martin (living, US, ch)
- Faith Martin (living, England, f), pseudonym of Jackie Walton
- George R. R. Martin (born 1948, US, f/d)
- J. P. Martin (1880–1966, England/S Africa, ch)
- Kat Martin (born 1947, US, f)
- Malachi Martin (1921–1999, Ireland/US, nf), also as Michael Serafian
- Mary Martin (1817–1884, England/N Zealand, nf)
- Philip Martin (1931–2005, Australia, p)
- Randall V. Martin (living, US, nf)
- Reginald Alec Martin (1908–1971, England, ch/f), pseudonyms E. C. Eliott and Rex Dixon
- Ros Martin (born 1960s, England, d/p)
- S. I. Martin (born 1961, England, nf/f/ch)
- William Martin (1767–1810, England, nf)
- William Martin (1772–1851, England, nf)
- William Martin (living, US, f)
- William Keble Martin (1877–1969, England, nf)
- Harriet Martineau (1802–1876, England, nf)
- Guillermo Martínez (born 1962, Argentina, f)
- Tomás Eloy Martínez (1934–2010, Argentina, nf)
- Zlatoje Martinov (born 1953, Yugoslavia/Serbia, nf)
- Savo Martinović (born 1935, Yugoslavia/Serbia, nf)
- João Cleófas Martins (1901–1970, Cape Verde, d)
- Joaquim Pedro de Oliveira Martins (1845–1894, Portugal, nf)
- José Tomás de Sousa Martins (1843–1897, Portugal, nf)
- Ovídio Martins (1928–1999, Cape Verde/Netherlands, p/nf)
- Harry Martinson (1904–1978, Sweden, f/p/d)
- Moa Martinson (1890–1964, Sweden, f/p)
- Sandra Marton (living, US, f)
- Margaret Maruani (1954–2022, Tunisia/France, nf)
- Saiichi Maruya (丸谷才一, 1925–2012, Japan, f/nf)
- Kenji Maruyama (丸山健二, born 1943, Japan, f)
- Andrew Marvell (1621–1678, England, p/nf)
- Karl Marx (1818–1883, Germany/England, nf)
- Cissy van Marxveldt (1889–1948, Netherlands, ch)
- Francis A. Marzen (1925–2004, US, nf)
- Gorō Masaki (柾悟郎, born 1957, Japan, f)
- Masaoka Shiki (正岡子規, 1867–1902, Japan, p/nf)
- John Masefield (1878–1967, England, p/ch)
- Barbara Masekela (born 1941, S Africa, p/nf)
- Lutfullah Mashal (born 1971, Afghanistan, nf/p)
- Mohale Mashigo (born 1983, S Africa, p/f)
- Veselin Masleša (1906–1943, Austria-Hungary/Yugoslavia, nf)
- Leo Maslíah (born 1954, Uruguay, p/f/d)
- A. E. W. Mason (1865–1948, England, f)
- Anita Mason (1942–2020, England, f)
- Bruce Mason (1921–1982, N Zealand, d)
- Ronald Mason (1912–2001, England, nf)
- Sineb El Masrar (born 1981, Germany, nf)
- Janine Massard (born 1939, Switzerland, f/nf/ch)
- Francisco Massiani (1944–2019, Venezuela, f/p)
- Allan Massie (1938–2026, Scotland, f/nf)
- Ursula Masson (1945–2008, Wales, nf)
- Alexander Masters (living, England, nf/d)
- Edgar Lee Masters (1868–1950, US, p/nf/d)
- Olga Masters (1919–1986, Australia, f/d)
- John Mastin (1747–1829, England, nf)
- Mostafa Mastoor (born 1964, Iran, f/nf)
- Ángeles Mastretta (born 1949, Mexico, f/nf)
- Carlos Mastronardi (1901–1976, Argentina, p/nf)
- Kāterina Mataira (1932–2011, N Zealand, nf)
- Carol Matas (born 1949, Canada, nf/ch)
- Simo Matavulj (1852–1908, Austrian E/Serbia, f/nf)
- Ruhaini Matdarin (born 1981, Malaysia, f/p)
- John Mateer (born 1971, S Africa/Australia, p/nf)
- Dary Matera (born 1955, US, nf)
- Mark Mathabane (born 1960, S Africa, nf)
- Dafydd Llwyd Mathau (fl. 1601–1629, Wales, p)
- Anne Mather (born 1946, England, f), pseudonym of Mildred Grieveson
- Cotton Mather (1663–1728, N American English colonies, f/nf)
- Hilda Matheson (1888–1940, England, nf/d)
- Richard Matheson (1926–2013, US, f/d)
- Ray Mathew (1929–2002, Australia, p/d/f)
- Sarah Mathew (c. 1805–1890, N Zealand, nf)
- Harry Mathews (1930–2017, US, f/p/nf)
- Peta Mathias (living, N Zealand, nf)
- Thomas James Mathias (c. 1754–1835, England, nf)
- Deborah Mathis (born 1953, US, nf)
- Dafydd Llwyd Mathau (fl. 1601–1629, Wales, p)
- Dušan Matić (1898–1980, Serbia/Yugoslavia, p/nf)
- Vladan Matijević (born 1962, Yugoslavia/Serbia, f/nf)
- Anne Matindi (born 1942, Kenya, ch/d)
- Gregório de Matos (1636–1696, Brazil, p)
- Luis Palés Matos (1898–1969, Puerto Rico, p/d)
- Nemir Matos-Cintrón (born 1949, Puerto Rico/US, p/f)
- Todd Matshikiza (1921–1968, S Africa, nf)
- Nicolaas Matsier (born 1945, Netherlands, f), pseudonym of Tjit Reinsma
- Seichō Matsumoto (松本清張, 1909–1992, Japan, f)
- Enzo Matsunaga (松永延造, 1895–1938, Japan, f)
- Matsuo Bashō (松尾芭蕉, 1644–1694, Japan, p)
- Don Mattera (1934–2022, S Africa, d/p/f)
- John Matteson (born 1961, US, nf)
- Dalene Matthee (1938–2005, S Africa, f)
- Carole Matthews (born 1960, England, f)
- Laura Matthews (living, US, f), pseudonym of Elizabeth Neff Walker
- Tina Matthews (born 1961, N Zealand, nf/f)
- Friedrich von Matthisson (1761–1831, Germany, p)
- Christobel Mattingley (1931–2019, Australia, ch/f/nf)
- János Mattis-Teutsch (1884–1960, Austria-Hungary/Romania, nf)
- José María Rivarola Matto (1917–1998, Paraguay, d/nf)
- Tomás de Mattos (1947–2016, Uruguay, f/nf)
- Aroj Ali Matubbar (1900–1985, India/Bangladesh, nf)
- Mustapha Matura (1939–2019, Trinidad/England, d)
- Sophie Dora Spicer Maude (1854–?, England, f)
- Henry Maudsley (1835–1918, England, nf)
- Israel Mauduit (1708–1787, England, nf)
- W. Somerset Maugham (1874–1965, England/France, f/d)
- Maung Maung (1925–1994, Burma/Myanmar, nf)
- Thu Maung (1951–2010, Burma/Myanmar, p/f)
- Édouard Maunick (1931–2021, Mauritius, p/nf)
- Guy de Maupassant (1850–1893, France, f/nf/p)
- Armistead Maupin (born 1944, US, f)
- Neža Maurer (1930–2025, Yugoslavia/Slovenia, ch/p/nf)
- François Mauriac (1885–1970, France, f/d/p)
- Frederick Denison Maurice (1805–1872, England, nf)
- Furnley Maurice (1881–1942, Australia, p), pseudonym of Frank Wilmot
- Angela du Maurier (1904–2002, England, f/nf)
- Daphne du Maurier (1907–1989, England, f/d)
- George du Maurier (1834–1896, France/England, f)
- Guy du Maurier (1865–1915, England/Belgium, d)
- André Maurois (1885–1967, France, f/nf)
- Charles Maurras (1868–1962, France, nf)
- Fritz Mauthner (1849–1923, Austrian E/Germany, f/nf)
- Virginie Mauvais (1797–1892), France, nf
- Tucker Max (born 1975, US, f)
- Daniel Maximin (born 1947, Guadeloupe/France, f/p/nf)
- Maximus the Confessor (c. 580–662 CE, Byzantine E, nf)
- Donald Maxwell (1877–1936, England, nf)
- Glyn Maxwell (born 1962, England, p/d/f)
- Kathleen Maxwell (born 1952, US, f), pseudonym of Kathryn Ptacek
- Patricia Maxwell (born 1942, US, f)
- William Hamilton Maxwell (1792–1850, Ireland/Scotland, f/nf)
- Julian May (1931–2017, US, f/ch)
- Karl May (1842–1912, Germany, f)
- Muriel May (1897–1982, N Zealand, nf)
- Peter May (1951–2025, Scotland/France, d/f)
- Vladimir Mayakovsky (1893–1930, Russian E/USSR, p/d)
- Ged Maybury (born 1953, N Zealand, ch)
- Richard Maybury (born 1946, US, nf)
- Marius von Mayenburg (born 1972, Germany, d)
- Arno J. Mayer (1926–2023, Luxembourg/US, nf)
- Bernadette Mayer (1945–2022, US, p/nf)
- Hans Mayer (1907–2001, Germany, nf)
- Mercer Mayer (born 1943, US, ch)
- Anne Mayfield (born 1952, US, f), pseudonym of Kathryn Ptacek
- Henry Mayhew (1812–1887, England, nf/d)
- James Mayhew (born 1964, England, ch)
- Charles Mayiga (born 1962, Uganda, nf)
- Jan Mayman (1940/1–2021, Australia, nf)
- William Mayne (1928–2010, England, ch)
- Cath Mayo (living, N Zealand, ch/f)
- F. M. Mayor (1872–1932, England, f)
- John E. B. Mayor (1825–1910, Ceylon/England, nf)
- Francisco Mayorga (born 1949, Nicaragua, f/nf/p)
- Salomón Ibarra Mayorga (1887–1985, Nicaragua, p)
- Taku Mayumura (眉村卓, 1934–2012, Japan, f/p)
- Ben Mazer (born 1964, US, p)
- Ibrahim al-Mazini (1889/1890–1949, Egypt, p/f/nf)
- José Ricardo Mazó (1927–1987, Paraguay, p)
- Ali Mazrui (1933–2014, Kenya/US, nf)
- Martynas Mažvydas (1510–1563, Grand Duchy of Lithuania, nf)
- Miha Mazzini (born 1961, Yugoslavia/Slovenia, f)

== Mb–Md ==
- Oliver Mbamara (living, Nigeria/US, p/nf)
- Amina Sow Mbaye (born 1937, Senegal, f/p/nf)
- Chantal Magalie Mbazo'o-Kassa (born 1967, Gabon, p/f)
- Guillaume Oyônô Mbia (1939–2021, Cameroon, d)
- Rose Mbowa (1943–1999, Uganda, nf/d)
- Imbolo Mbue (born 1981, Cameroon/US, f/nf)
- Bernadette Devlin McAliskey (born 1947, N Ireland, nf)
- Anne McAllister (living, US, f)
- Robert McAlmon (1896–1956, US, f/nf/p)
- Rachel McAlpine (born 1940, N Zealand, p/f/d)
- Maxine McArthur (born 1962, Australia, f/nf)
- Tawiah M'carthy (living, Ghana/Canada, d)
- James McAuley (1917–1976, Australia, nf/p)
- Paul J. McAuley (born 1955, England, nf/f)
- Ian McBryde (born 1953, Canada/Australia, p)
- Simon McBurney (born 1957, England, d)
- Anne McCaffrey (1926–2011, US/Ireland, f)
- Mary McCallum (born 1961, N Zealand, f/nf)
- Anthony McCarten (born 1961, N Zealand, f/d/nf)
- Colman McCarthy (1938–2026, US, nf)
- Cormac McCarthy (1933–2023, US, f/d)
- Eugene McCarthy (1916–2005, US, nf/ch/p)
- Helen McCarthy (born 1951, England, nf)
- Pete McCarthy (1951–2004, England, nf)
- Susan McCaslin (born 1947, Canada, p/nf/ch)
- Geraldine McCaughrean (born 1951, England, ch)
- Sue McCauley (born 1941, N Zealand, f/d/nf)
- J. D. McClatchy (1945–2018, US, p/nf)
- David McClintock (1913–2001, England, nf)
- Robert McCloskey (1914–2003, US, ch)
- Joanna McClure (born 1930, US, p)
- James H. McClure (1939–2006, S Africa, f/nf)
- Michael McClure (1932–2020, US, p/d/f)
- Lyn McConchie (born 1946, N Zealand, f/ch/nf)
- David McCooey (born 1967, England/Australia, p/nf)
- Una McCormack (born 1972, England, d/f)
- Frank McCourt (1930–2009, Ireland, nf)
- Annie Virginia McCracken (1868–?, US, f)
- Esther McCracken (1902–1971, England, d)
- Josephine Clifford McCracken (1839–1921, Germany/US, nf/f)
- George Gordon McCrae (1833–1927, Scotland/Australia, p)
- Georgiana McCrae (1804–1890, England/Australia, nf)
- Hugh McCrae (1876–1958, Australia, p)
- John McCrae (1872–1918, Canada, p)
- Sharyn McCrumb (born 1948, US, nf/f)
- Ronald McCuaig (1908–1993, Australia, p/nf/ch)
- Carson McCullers (1917–1967, US, f/d/p), pseudonym of Lula Carson Smith
- Johnston McCulley (1883–1958, US, f/d)
- Colleen McCullough (1937–2015, Australia/Norfolk Is, f)
- David McCullough (1933–2022, US, nf)
- Carolyn McCurdie (born 1947, England/N Zealand, ch/f/p)
- Andy McDermott, born 1974, England, f/nf)
- Jack McDevitt (born 1935, US, f/nf)
- Henry McDonald (1965–2023, N Ireland, nf/f)
- Jill McDonald (1927–1982, N Zealand/England, ch)
- Nan McDonald (1921–1974, Australia, p)
- Roger McDonald (born 1941, Australia, f/nf/p)
- Walt McDonald (1934–2022, US, p)
- Flora McDonnell (born 1963, England, ch)
- Ian McEwan (born 1948, England, f/d)
- Melanie McFadyean (1950–2023, England, nf/f)
- Ella McFadyen (1887–1976, Australia, p/nf/ch)
- Fiona McFarlane (born 1978, Australia, f)
- Leslie McFarlane (1902–1977, Canada, f/d)
- Shona McFarlane (1929–2001, N Zealand, nf)
- William McFee (1881–1966, England/US, f)
- Greg McGee (born 1950, N Zealand, f/d)
- May McGoldrick (US, shared pseudonym, f)
- Elvis McGonagall (born 1960, Scotland, p)
- William McGonagall (1825–1902, Ireland/Scotland, p)
- Roger McGough (born 1937, England, p/d/ch)
- Michelle McGrane (born 1974, Rhodesia/S Africa, p/nf)
- Campbell McGrath (born 1962, US, p)
- Patrick McGrath (born 1950, England/US, f)
- Thomas McGrath (1916–1990, US, p)
- Wendy McGrath (living, Canada, f/p)
- Eloise Jarvis McGraw (1915–2000, US, ch)
- Fiona Kelly McGregor (born 1965, Australia, f/nf)
- Jon McGregor (born 1976, England, f)
- Jerrilyn McGregory (living, US, f/nf)
- Patrick McGuinness (born 1968, Tunisia/England, f/p/nf)
- Abdeslam Ben Mchich (1140–1227, Morocco, nf)
- Heather McHugh (born 1948, US, p)
- Maureen F. McHugh (born 1959, US, f)
- Siobhán McHugh (living, Ireland/Australia, nf/f)
- Ralph McInerny (1929–2010, US, f/p)
- Mary Susan McIntosh (1936–2013, England, nf)
- James McIntyre (1928–2006, Scotland/Canada, p)
- Claude McKay (1890–1948, Jamaica/US, f/p)
- Don McKay (born 1942, Canada, p)
- Edith McKay (1891–1963, Australia, f)
- Hilary McKay (born 1959, England, ch)
- Sharon E. McKay (born 1954, Canada, ch)
- David McKee (1935–2022, England, ch)
- Terence McKenna (1946–2000, US, nf)
- Florence Violet McKenzie (1890 or 1892–1982, Australia, nf)
- Dennis L. McKiernan (born 1932, US, f)
- Robin McKinley (born 1952, US, ch/nf)
- Tamara McKinley (born 1948, Australia/England, f)
- Meagan McKinney (born 1961, US, f), pseudonym of Ruth Goodman
- Patricia McKissack (1944–2017, US, ch)
- Rod McKuen (1933–2015, US, p)
- Greg McLaren (born 1967, Australia, p/nf)
- Rosemary McLeod (born 1949, N Zealand, nf)
- Marshall McLuhan (1911–1980, Canada, nf)
- Barbara McMahon (born 1961, US, f)
- Katharine McMahon (living, England, f)
- Emily Julian McManus (1865–1918, Canada, p/nf)
- Rhyll McMaster (born 1947, Australia, p/f)
- James L. McMichael (born 1939, US, p)
- Ian McMillan (born 1956, England, p/d)
- Michael McMillan (born 1962, England, d/nf)
- Mary McMullen (1920–1986, US, f), pseudonym of Mary Reilly
- Larry McMurtry (1936–2021, US, f)
- Linda McNabb (born 1963, England/N Zealand, ch/f)
- Bertha McNamara (1853–1931, Germany/Australia, nf)
- Judith McNaught (born 1944, US, f)
- Colin McNaughton (born 1951, England, ch)
- Kit McNaughton (c. 1887–1953, Australia, nf)
- H. C. McNeile (1888–1937, England, f), pseudonym Sapper
- Janet McNeill (1907–1994, Ireland/England, f/d/ch)
- Clive Leo McNeir (living, England, f/nf)
- James McNeish (1931–2016, N Zealand, f/d/nf)
- Cilla McQueen (born 1949, N Zealand, p)
- Karen McQuestion (born 1961, US, f/ch)
- Geoffrey McSkimming (born 1962, Australia, ch/p)
- Norris McWhirter (1925–2004, England, nf)
- Ross McWhirter (1925–1975, England, nf)
- Zakes Mda (born 1948, S Africa, f/p/d), pseudonym of Zanemvula Kizito Gatyeni Mda

== Me ==
- Richelle Mead (born 1976, US, f)
- L. T. Meade (1844–1914, Ireland, ch)
- Stephen W. Meader (1892–1977, US, ch)
- Gillian Mears (1964–2016, Australia, f)
- Gwallter Mechain (1761–1849, Wales, p/nf), pseudonym of Walter Davies
- Gwerful Mechain (fl. 1460–1502, Wales, p)
- Mechthild of Magdeburg (c. 1207 – c. 1282/1294, Germany, nf)
- Anoeschka von Meck (born 1967, SW Africa/Namibia, f/nf)
- Christoph Meckel (1935–2020, Germany, f/nf)
- Miriam Meckel (born 1967, Germany, nf)
- Richard James Mecredy (1861–1924, Ireland, nf)
- Dejan Medaković (1922–2008, Yugoslavia/Serbia, nf)
- Peter Medawar (1915–1987, Brazil/England, nf)
- Abdelwahab Meddeb (1946–2014, Tunisia/France, nf)
- Teresa Medeiros (born 1962/1963, US, f)
- Nia Medi (living, Wales, d/f)
- Peace Adzo Medie (living, Liberia/Ghana, f/nf)
- Lucila Gamero de Medina (1873–1964, Honduras, f)
- Jean-Louis Njemba Medu (1902–1966, Cameroon, f)
- Roy Medvedev (1925–2026, Russia, nf)
- Thomas Medwin (1788–1869, England, p/nf)
- Arthur Mee (1875–1943, England, nf/cs)
- Charles Denis Mee (1927–2023, England, nf)
- Thomas Meehan (1929–2017, US, d)
- S. P. Meek (1894–1972, US, f/ch)
- Elizabeth Meeke (1761 – c. 1826, England, f/ch)
- Selma Meerbaum-Eisinger (1924–1942, Romania/Ukraine, p), Holocaust victim
- Megas (born 1945, Iceland, nf), pseudonym of Magnús Þór Jónsson
- Helen Megaw (1907–2002, Ireland/England, nf)
- Jhaverchand Meghani (1896–1947, India, p/f/nf)
- Ibrahim Abdel Meguid (born 1946, Egypt, f)
- Mariella Mehr (1947–2022, Switzerland/Italy, f)
- Stein Mehren (1935–2017, Norway, p/nf/d)
- Walter Mehring (1896–1981, Germany/Switzerland, nf/p)
- Narsinh Mehta (fl. 15th c., Delhi Sultanate/Gujarat Sultanate, p)
- Mei Yaochen (梅堯臣, 1002–1060, China, p)
- Dora van der Meiden-Coolsma (1918–2001, Netherlands, ch)
- Niklaus Meienberg (1940–1993, Switzerland, nf)
- Ischa Meijer (1943–1995, Netherlands, nf)
- Ulrike Meinhof (1934–1976, Germany, nf)
- Wilhelm Meinhold (1797–1851, Sweden/Germany, p/d/f)
- Peter Meinke (born 1932, US, p/f)
- Cecília Meireles (1901–1964, Brazil, p/nf)
- Ahmed Mejjati (1936–1995, Morocco, p)
- Jamila Mejri (born 1951, Tunisia, p)
- Tsehay Melaku (born c. 1952, Ethiopia, f)
- Sagi Melamed (born 1965, US, nf)
- Philip Melanchthon (1497–1560, Germany, nf)
- Tamta Melashvili (born 1979, USSR/Georgia, f)
- Fulvio Melia (born 1956, Italy/US, nf)
- Melissus of Samos (fl. 5th c. BCE, Greece, nf)
- Paulus Melissus (1539–1602, Germany, p)
- Agop Melkonyan (1949–2006, Bulgaria, f/nf)
- John van Melle (1887–1953, Netherlands/S Africa, f)
- Francisco Manuel de Mello (1608–1666, Portugal, p/nf)
- Luís Romano de Madeira Melo (1922–2010, Cape Verde/Brazil, p/f/nf)
- David Meltzer (1937–2016, US, p)
- Milton Meltzer (1915–2009, US, nf/ch)
- Herman Melville (1819–1891, US, f/p)
- Pauline Melville (born 1948, British Guiana/England, f)
- Albert Memmi (1920–2020, Tunisia/France, f/nf)
- Menander (c. 342/41 – c. 290 BCE, Greece, d)
- Eva Menasse (born 1970, Austria, f/nf)
- Robert Menasse (born 1954, Austria, f/nf)
- Šiško Menčetić (1457–1527, Ragusa, p)
- Mencius (孟子, 372–289 or 385 – c. 303/302 BCE, China, nf)
- Charlotte Mendelson (born 1972, England, f/nf)
- Paul Mendelson (born 1965, England, f/nf)
- Moses Mendelssohn (1729–1786, Germany, nf)
- Catulle Mendès (1841–1909, France, p/nf)
- Murilo Mendes (1901–1975, Brazil, p)
- Eduardo Mendoza (born 1943, Spain, f)
- Susan Mendus (born 1951, Wales/England, nf)
- Saida Menebhi (1952–1977, Morocco, p)
- Guillermo Meneses (1911–1978, Venezuela, nf/d)
- Holdemar Menezes (1921–1996, Brazil, f/nf)
- Meng Haoran (孟浩然, c. 689/691–740, China, p)
- Dinaw Mengestu (born 1978, Ethiopia/US, f/nf)
- Maaza Mengiste (born 1974, Ethiopia/US, f)
- John Mennes (1599–1671, England, p)
- Louis-François-Henri de Menon (1717–1776, France, nf)
- Louise Mensch (born 1971, England/US, f), pseudonym Louise Bagshawe
- Wolfgang Menzel (1898–1973, Germany, p/nf)
- Juan León Mera (1832–1894, Ecuador, nf/f/p)
- Wolla Meranda (1863–1951, Australia, f/p)
- Tibor Méray (1924–2020, Hungary/France, nf)
- Giorgi Merchule (fl. 10th c., Georgia, f/nf)
- Johann Heinrich Merck (1741–1791, Germany, nf)
- Sophie Mereau (1770–1806, Germany, f/p)
- Courtney Sina Meredith (born 1986, N Zealand, p/d/f)
- George Meredith (1828–1909, England, f/p)
- Gwen Meredith (1907–2006, Australia, d/f)
- Louisa Anne Meredith (1812–1895, England/Australia, p/nf/f)
- Francis Meres (1565/1566–1647, England, nf)
- Maria Sibylla Merian (1647–1717, Germany/Netherlands, nf)
- Kersti Merilaas (1913–1986, Estonia, p/d/ch)
- Prosper Mérimée (1803–1870, France, f/nf)
- Alda Merini (1931–2009, Italy, p/nf)
- Louise Meriwether (1923–2023, f/nf/ch)
- Christina Merlin (1911–1995, England, f), pseudonym of Constance Fecher Heaven
- Fatema Mernissi (1940–2015, Morocco, nf)
- Willem de Mérode (1887–1939, Netherlands, p), pseudonym of Willem Eduard Keuning
- Antonieta Rivas Mercado (1900–1931, Mexico, nf)
- Richard Meros (born 1981, N Zealand, f/nf), pseudonym of Murdoch Stephens
- Concordia Merrel (1885–1962, England, f)
- Christopher Merret (1614/1615–1695, England, nf)
- Leonard Merrick (1864–1939, England, f)
- Judith Merril (1923–1997, US/Canada, f/nf), pseudonym of Judith Josephine Grossman
- James Merrill (1926–1995, US, p/nf/f)
- Jean Merrill (1923–2012, US, ch)
- Jenny B. Merrill (1854–1934, US, nf)
- Stuart Merrill (1863–1915, US, p)
- Catherine Merriman (born 1949, England/Wales, f)
- Abraham Merritt (1884–1943, US, f)
- Iman Mersal (born 1966, Egypt, p)
- Marin Mersenne (1588–1648, France, nf)
- Thomas Merton (1915–1968, US, nf/p)
- W. S. Merwin (1927–2019, US, p/nf/d)
- Mahmoud Messadi (1911–2004, Tunisia, f)
- Elizabeth Messenger (1908–1965, N Zealand, nf)
- Sarah Messer (born 1966, US, p/nf)
- Erik Mesterton (1903–2004, Sweden, nf)
- John Metcalfe (1891–1965, England/US, f)
- Joan Metelerkamp (born 1956, S Africa, p)
- Charlotte Mew (1869–1928, England, p)
- Kyle Mewburn (born 1963, N Zealand, ch)
- Antoine Meyer (1801–1857, Luxembourg/Belgium, nf/p)
- Conrad Ferdinand Meyer (1825–1898, Switzerland, p/f)
- Deon Meyer (born 1958, S Africa, f)
- Marissa Meyer (born 1984, US, f)
- Nicholas Meyer (born 1945, US, f)
- Stephenie Meyer (born 1973, US, f)
- Alice Meynell (1847–1922, England/Italy, nf/p)
- Laurence Meynell (1899–1989, England, ch/f)
- Melchior Meyr (1810–1871, Germany, p/f/nf)
- Gustav Meyrink (1868–1932, Austria/Germany, f/d), pseudonym of Gustav Meyer
- Jean de Meun (c. 1240 – c. 1305, Framce, p)
- Henry Meyer (1840–1925, US, p)
- Júníus Meyvant (born 1982, Iceland, p), pseudonym of Unnar Gísli Sigurmundsson
- Fodil Mezali (born 1959, Algeria, nf)
- Hocine Mezali (born 1938, Algeria, nf)
- Nega Mezlekia (born 1958, Ethiopia/Canada, nf/f)
- Ferenc Mező (1885–1961, Hungary, p)
- Sebastian Okechukwu Mezu (born 1941, Nigeria/US, nf/f/d)

== M'G–Mn ==
- James M'Govan (1845–1919, N Zealand/Scotland, f/nf), pseudonym of William Crawford Honeyman
- Thando Mgqolozana (born 1983, S Africa, f/d)
- Cont Mhlanga (1957/1958–2022, S Rhodesia/Zimbabwe, d)
- Niq Mhlongo (born 1973, S Africa, f/nf)
- Gcina Mhlophe (born 1958, S Africa, nf/p/d)
- Mi Fu (米黻, 1051–1107, China, p)
- Bande Ali Mia (1906–1979, India/Bangladesh, p/nf/d)
- Mian Mian (棉棉, born 1970, China, f)
- Léonora Miano (born 1973, Cameroon, f)
- James Lionel Michael (1824–1868, England/Australia, p)
- Judith Michael (born 1934 and 1937, US, f/nf), pseudonym of Judith Bernard and Michael Fain
- Karin Michaëlis (1872–1950, Denmark, f/nf/ch)
- Barbara Michaels (1927–2013, US, f/nf), pseudonym Elizabeth Peters
- Fern Michaels (born 1933, US, f)
- Leigh Michaels (born 1954, US, f)
- Joseph François Michaud (1767–1839, Savoie/France, nf)
- Henri Michaux (1899–1984, Belgium/France, p/nf)
- Jean Michel (c. 1435–1501, France, p/d)
- Nicholas Michell (1807–1880, England, p)
- Lucien Xavier Michel-Andrianarahinjaka (1929–1997, Mozambique, nf/p)
- Michelangelo (1475–1564, Italy, p)
- Jon Michelet (1944–2018, Norway, f/ch)
- Nicholas Michell (1807–1880, England, p/f)
- Richard Michelson (born 1953, US, p/ch)
- Michitsuna no Haha (藤原道綱母, c. 935–995, Japan, p)
- Ljubomir Micić (1895–1971, Austro-Hungary/Yugoslavia, p/nf)
- Tadeusz Miciński (1873–1918, Russian E, f/p)
- Lizzie Mickery (living, England, d)
- Veronica Micle (1850–1889, Austria-Hungary/Romania, p)
- Adam Mickiewicz (1798–1855, Russian E/Ottoman E, p/d/nf)
- Christopher Middleton (c. 1560–1628, England, p)
- Christopher Middleton (1926–2015), England, p)
- Conyers Middleton (1683–1750, England, nf)
- Erasmus Middleton (1739–1805, England, nf)
- Ian Middleton (1928–2007, N Zealand, f)
- O. E. Middleton (1925–2010, N Zealand, f)
- Richard Barham Middleton (1882–1911, England/Belgium, p/f)
- Stanley Middleton (1919–2009, England, f)
- Thomas Middleton (1580–1627, England, d/p)
- Wiliam Midleton (c. 1550–1596, Wales, p)
- Hugo Midón (1944–2011, Argentina, ch)
- Agnes Miegel (1879–1964, Germany, p/f)
- Dorothy Miell (living, England, nf)
- Stanisław Mieroszewski (1827–1900, Poland, nf)
- Sandra Miesel (born 1941, US, f/nf)
- China Miéville (born 1972, England, f/nf)
- Migjeni (1911–1938, Albania/Italy, p)
- Emilio F. Mignone (1922–1998, Argentina, nf)
- José Rodrigues Miguéis (1901–1980, Portugal/US, nf)
- Miguna Miguna (born 1962, Kenya/Canada, nf)
- Gib Mihăescu (1894–1935, Romania, f/nf/d)
- Mihajlo Mihajlov (1934–2010, Yugoslavia/Serbia, nf)
- Dragoslav Mihailović (1930–2023, Yugoslavia/Serbia, nf)
- Jasmina Mihajlović (born 1960, Yugoslavia/Serbia, nf)
- Jo Mihaly (1902–1989, Germany/Switzerland, nf/f), pseudonym of Elfriede Alice "Piete" Kuhr
- Stoyan Mihaylovski (1856–1927, Bulgaria, nf/p/d)
- Mira Mihelič (1912–1985, Austrian E/Yugoslavia, f/nf/ch)
- Borislav Mihajlović Mihiz (1922–1997, Yugoslavia, d/nf)
- Kato Mikeladze (1878–1942, Russian E/USSR, nf)
- Miloš Mikeln (1930–2014, Yugoslavia/Slovenia, d/f/nf)
- Kelemen Mikes (1690–1761, Hungary/Ottoman E, nf)
- Kálmán Mikszáth (1847–1910, Hungary, f/nf)
- Gakuto Mikumo (三雲岳斗, born 1970, Japan, f)
- Karlo Mila (born 1974, N Zealand, p)
- Imdadul Haq Milan (born 1955, E Pakistan/Bangladesh, f/nf)
- Abbas Milani (born 1949, Iran/US, nf)
- Milutin Milanković (1879–1958, Austria-Hungary/Yugoslavia, nf)
- Jovan Grčić Milenko (1846–1875, Austria-Hungary, p/f)
- Dorothy Miles (1931–1993, Wales/England, p/nf)
- Gareth Miles (1938–2023, Wales, f)
- Jack Miles (born 1942, US, nf)
- Josephine Miles (1911–1985, US, p/nf)
- Avram Miletić (1755 – post-1826, Habsburg E/Serbia, p)
- Katherine Milhous (1894–1977, US, f/ch)
- Princess Milica of Serbia (c. 1335–1405, Serbia, p)
- Milan Milićević (1831–1908, Serbia, nf/f)
- Ognjenka Milićević (1927–2008, Yugoslavia/Serbia, nf)
- Milan Milišić (1941–1991, Yugoslavia/Croatia, p/d/nf)
- Jennifer Militello (living, US, p/nf)
- Marko Miljanov (1833–1901, Ottoman E/Austria-Hungary, nf)
- Branko Miljković (1934–1961, Yugoslavia, p)
- James Mill (1773–1836, Scotland, nf)
- John Stuart Mill (1806–1873, England/France, nf)
- Edna St. Vincent Millay (1892–1950, US, p/d)
- Alice Duer Miller (1874–1942, US, p/f/d)
- Arthur Miller (1915–2005, US, d/nf)
- E. Ethelbert Miller (born 1950, US, p)
- Frank Miller (born 1957, US, f/d)
- Grażyna Miller (1957–2009, Poland/Italy, p/nf)
- Henry Miller (1891–1980, US, f/nf)
- James Russell Miller (1840–1912, US, nf)
- Jane Miller (born 1949, US, p)
- Joaquin Miller (1837–1913, US, p), birth name Cincinnatus Heine Miller
- Ken Miller (born 1963, US, nf)
- Kirsten Miller (living, S Africa, nf/f/ch)
- Leslie Adrienne Miller (born 1956, US, p)
- Linda Lael Miller (born 1949, US, f)
- Liz Miller (born 1957, England, nf)
- Merle Miller (1919–1986, US, f/nf)
- Olive Beaupré Miller (1883–1968, US, ch), born Olive Kennon Beaupré
- P. Schuyler Miller (1912–1974, US, f/nf)
- Serena B. Miller (born 1950, US, f)
- Steve Miller (born 1957, US, nf)
- Thomas Miller (1807–1874, England, p/f)
- Vassar Miller (1924–1998, US, p/f)
- Walter M. Miller, Jr. (1923–1996, US, f)
- John Millett (1921–2019, Australia, p/nf)
- Steven Millhauser (born 1943, US, f)
- Arthenia J. Bates Millican (1920–2012, US, p/f/nf)
- Spike Milligan (1918–2002, India/England, p/nf/d)
- Mil Millington (living, England, nf/f)
- Millosh Gjergj Nikolla (1911–1938, Albania/Italy, p/nf)
- Anne Mills (born 1951, England, nf)
- Lady Dorothy Mills (1889–1959, England, f/nf)
- John Atta Mills (1944–2012, Gold Coast/Ghana, nf)
- Magnus Mills (born 1954, England, f)
- Henry Hart Milman (1791–1868, England, nf/d/p)
- A. A. Milne (1882–1956, England, ch/f/nf)
- Christopher Robin Milne (1920–1996, England, nf)
- Donna Milner (born 1946, Canada, f)
- Miloš Milojević (1840–1897, Serbia, nf)
- Czesław Miłosz (1911–2004, Russian E/Poland, p/f)
- Branislav Milosavljević (1879–1944, Serbia/Yugoslavia, p)
- Nikola Milošević (1929–2007, Yugoslavia/Serbia, nf)
- John Milton (1608–1674, England, p/nf)
- Richard Milward (born 1984, England, f/nf)
- Franco Mimmi (born 1942, Italy, f/nf)
- Rachid Mimouni (1945–1995, Algeria, f/nf)
- Maung Khin Min (Danubyu) (living, Myanmar, nf)
- Myo Min (1910–1995, Burma/Myanmar, nf), pseudonym Nwe Soe
- Takitarō Minakami (水上滝太郎, 1887–1940, Japan, f/nf)
- Tsutomu Minakami (水上勉, 1919–2004, Japan, f/nf/d)
- Minakata Kumagusu (南方熊楠, 1867–1941, Japan, nf)
- Bridget Minamore (born 1991, England p/nf)
- Marga Minco (1920–2023, Netherlands, nf)
- Guðrún Eva Mínervudóttir (born 1976, Iceland, f)
- Robert Minhinnick (born 1952, Wales, p/nf/f)
- Matthew Minicucci (born 1981, US, p/nf)
- Svetoslav Minkov (1902–1966, Bulgaria, f)
- Justine Mintsa (born 1949, Gabon, f/nf)
- Ion Minulescu (1881–1944, Romania, p/f/d)
- Mir Taqi Mir (1723–1810, Mughal India, p)
- Pedro Mir (1913–2000, Dominican Rep., p/nf/f)
- Mirabai (fl. 16th c., India, p)
- Mohammad Daud Miraki (born 1967, Afghanistan/US, nf)
- Alicia Miranda Hevia (born 1952, Costa Rica, f)
- Ana Miranda (born 1951, Brazil, p/f)
- Francisco de Sá de Miranda (1481–1558, Portugal, p)
- José Bragança de Miranda (born 1953, Portugal, nf)
- Lin-Manuel Miranda (born 1980, US, nf/d)
- Mir-Jam (1887–1952, Serbia/Yugoslavia, f), pseudonym of Milica Jakovljević
- Čedomir Mirković (1944–2005, Yugoslavia/Serbia, nf)
- Carmen A. Miró (1919–2022, Panama, nf)
- Ricardo Miró (1883–1940, Panama, p/f)
- Salvador Díaz Mirón (1853–1928, Mexico, p)
- Igor Mirović (born 1968, Yugoslavia/Serbia, nf/p)
- Jamal Mirsadeghi (born 1933, Iran, f/d)
- Heidi Safia Mirza (born 1958, England, nf)
- Cheryl Misak (living, Canada, nf)
- Y. Misdaq (living, England, f/p)
- Ludwig von Mises (1881–1973, Austria/US, nf)
- Yukio Mishima (三島由紀夫, 1925–1970, Japan, nf/p/d)
- Sudesh Mishra (born 1962, Fiji/Australia, p)
- Krste Misirkov (1874–1926, Ottoman E/Bulgaria, nf)
- Ahmed Baba Miské (1935–2016, Mauritania, nf)
- Mohamed Missouri (1947–2015, Algeria, nf)
- Gabriela Mistral (1889–1957, Chile/US, p/nf)
- Munesuke Mita (見田宗介, 1937–2022, Japan, nf)
- Adrian Mitchell (1932–2008, England, p/f/d)
- Ann Katharine Mitchell (1922–2020, England/Scotland, nf)
- David Mitchell (1940–2011, N Zealand, p)
- David Mitchell (born 1969, England, f/nf)
- Donald Grant Mitchell (1822–1908, US, nf/f)
- Elyne Mitchell (1913–2002, Australia, ch/nf)
- Joseph Mitchell (1908–1996, US, nf)
- Margaret Mitchell (1900–1949, US, f/nf)
- Norval Mitchell (1906–1988, England/British India, nf)
- Paul Mitchell (born 1968, p/f)
- Silas Weir Mitchell (1829–1914, US, f/p)
- Stephen Mitchell (born 1943, US, p/nf)
- Waddie Mitchell (born 1950, US, p)
- Naomi Mitchison (1897–1999, Scotland/England, f/nf)
- Jessica Mitford (1917–1996, England, nf)
- Mary Russell Mitford (1787–1855, England, nf/p/d)
- Nancy Mitford (1904–1973, England/France, f/nf)
- William Mitford (1744–1827, England, nf)
- Anna Mitgutsch (born 1948, Austria, f/nf)
- Bartolomé Mitre (1821–1906, Argentina, nf)
- Dimitrije Mitrinović (1887–1953, Austria-Hungary/England, nf/p)
- Milorad Mitrović (1867–1907, Serbia, p)
- Mitra Mitrović (1912–2001, Yugoslavia/Serbia, nf)
- Srba Mitrović (1931–2007, Yugoslavia/Serbia, p)
- Ryu Mitsuse (光瀬龍, 1928–1999, Japan, f/nf)
- Miyuki Miyabe (宮部みゆき, born 1960, Japan, f)
- Teru Miyamoto (宮本輝, born 1947, Japan, f)
- Miyamoto Yuriko (宮本百合子, 1899–1951, Japan, f/nf)
- Hayao Miyazaki (宮崎駿, born 1941, Japan, d/nf)
- Kenji Miyazawa (宮沢賢治, 1896–1933, Japan, f/ch/nf)
- Miyoshi Kiyotsura (三善清行, 847–918, Japan, nf)
- Tatsuji Miyoshi (三好達治, 1900–1964, Japan, p/nf)
- Minae Mizumura (水村美苗, born 1951, Japan, f)
- Kogen Mizuno (水野 弘元, 1901–2006, Japan, nf)
- Ndre Mjeda (1866–1937, Ottoman E/Albania, p/nf)
- Emily Mkamanga (1949–2021, Nyasaland/Malawi, f/nf)
- Sarah Mkhonza (born 1957, Swaziland/US, f/nf)
- Vojislav Ilić Mlađi (1877–1944, Serbia/Yugoslavia, p)
- Stanisław Młodożeniec (1895–1959, Russian E/Poland, p)
- Ladislav Mňačko (1919–1994, Czechoslovakia/Slovakia, nf)
- Felix Mnthali (born 1933, S Rhodesia/Malawi, p/f/d)

== Mo ==
- Timothy Mo (毛翔青, born 1950, Hong Kong/England, f)
- Mo Xuanqing (莫宣卿, born 834, China, p)
- Mo Yan (管謨業, born 1955, China, f)
- Moamyn (fl. 9th c. CE, Abbasid Caliphate, nf)
- Vilhelm Moberg (1898–1973, Sweden, nf/d)
- Fray Mocho (1858–1903, Argentina, nf)
- Ja'far Modarres-Sadeghi (born 1954, Iran, f)
- Vinko Möderndorfer (born 1958, Yugoslavia/Slovenia, ch/p/f)
- L. E. Modesitt, Jr. (born 1943, US, f/nf/p)
- Klaus Modick (born 1951, Germany, f/nf)
- William Modisane (1923–1986, S Africa, nf)
- Drusilla Modjeska (born 1946, Papua New Guinea/Australia, f/nf)
- Ingvar Moe (1936–1993, Norway, p/f/ch)
- Jørgen Moe (1813–1882, Norway, f/p)
- Karin Moe (born 1945, Norway, f/nf)
- Tin Moe (1933–2007, Burma/Myanmar, p)
- Moelona (1877–1953, Wales, f/ch), pseudonym of Elizabeth Mary Jones
- Walter Moers (born 1957, Germany, ch)
- Melody Moezzi (born 1979, Iran/US, nf)
- Donald Moffitt (1931–2014, US, f)
- Thomas Mofolo (1876–1948, Basutoland/Lesotho, f)
- George Mogridge (1787–1854, England, ch/nf), pseudonym Old Humphrey
- Mahathir Mohamad (born 1925, Malaya/Malaysia, nf)
- Nadifa Mohamed (born 1981, Somaliland/England, f)
- Si Mohand (1848–1905, Algeria, p)
- Georg Mohr (1640–1697, Denmark/Germany, nf)
- Joseph Mohr (1792–1848, Austria, nf/p)
- Paul Möhring (1710–1792, Germany, nf)
- Toril Moi (born 1953, Norway, nf)
- David Macbeth Moir (1798–1851, Scotland, p/nf)
- Abraham de Moivre (1667–1754, France, nf)
- Javad Mojabi (born 1939, Iran, p/nf)
- Anis Mojgani (born 1977, US, p)
- Tze Ming Mok (莫志明, born 1978, N Zealand, f/nf)
- Malika Mokeddem (born 1949, Algeria, f)
- Amel Mokhtar (born 1964, Tunisia, nf/f)
- Mohammad Mokhtari (1942–1998, Iran, nf/p)
- John Mole (born 1941, England, p/ch)
- Natalia Molebatsi (living, S Africa, p)
- Molière (1622–1673, France, d/p), pseudonym of Jean Baptiste Poquelin
- Juan Ramón Molina (1875–1908, Honduras, p)
- Atukuri Molla (1440–1530, India, p)
- Ferenc Molnár (1878–1952, Austria/US, d/p)
- József Molnár (1918–2009, Hungary/Germany, nf)
- Walter von Molo (1880–1958, Austria-Hungary/Germany, f/d/nf)
- Nurul Momen (1908–1990, India/Bangladesh, d/nf/p), pseudonym Natyaguru
- Dele Momodu (born 1960, Nigeria, nf)
- Lília Momplé (born 1935, Mozambique, f)
- Nicola Monaghan (born 1971, England, f)
- Pablo Balarezo Moncayo (1904–1999, Ecuador, p/nf)
- Pérrine Moncrieff (1893–1979, N Zealand, nf)
- Eduardo Mondlane (1920–1969, Mozambique, nf)
- Aleksandra Monedzhikova (1889–1959, Bulgaria, nf)
- Tierno Monénembo (born 1947, Guinea/France, f)
- Joaquín García Monge (1881–1958, Costa Rica, f)
- António Egas Moniz (1874–1955, Portugal, nf)
- Karyn Monk (born 1960, Canada, f)
- Bernard de la Monnoye (1641–1728, France, p/nf)
- Harold Monro (1879–1932, Belgium/England, p)
- Aly Monroe (living, England, f)
- Chris Monroe (born 1962, US, ch)
- Harriet Monroe (1860–1936, US/Peru, nf/p)
- Jack Monroe (born 1988, England, nf)
- Nicholas Monsarrat (1910-1979)
- Messenger Monsey (1694–1788, England, nf)
- Carlos Monsiváis (1938–2010, Mexico, nf)
- Basil Montagu (1770–1851, England, nf)
- Charles Montagu, 1st Earl of Halifax 1661–1715, England, p)
- Elizabeth Montagu (1718–1800, England, nf)
- John Montague (1929–2016, US/France, p/f/nf)
- Eugenio Montale (1896–1981, Italy, p/nf)
- Stephanie de Montalk (born 1945, N Zealand, p/nf)
- Geoffrey Potocki de Montalk (1903–1997, N Zealand/France, nf)
- Emilio Álvarez Montalván (1919–2014, Nicaragua, nf)
- Juan Montalvo (1832–1889, Ecuador, d/f)
- Richard Montanari (born 1952, US, f)
- Dora Montefiore (1851–1933, England/Australia, p/nf)
- Simon Sebag Montefiore (born 1965, England, nf/f)
- Eugenio Montejo (1938–2008, Venezuela, p/nf)
- Augusto Monterroso (1921–2003, Honduras/Mexico, f)
- Graciela Montes (born 1947, Argentina, ch/nf)
- Eduardo Montes-Bradley (born 1960, Argentina/US, f/nf)
- Montesquieu (1689–1755, France, nf)
- Alexander Montgomerie ((c. 1550–1598, Scotland, p)
- James Montgomery (1771–1854, Scotland/England, p/nf)
- Florence Montgomery (1843–1923, England, f/ch)
- Lucy Maud Montgomery (1936–2014, Canada, f/ch)
- R. A. Montgomery (1874–1942, US, ch)
- Jean-Pierre Montcassen (born 1967, Hungary, f/p), pseudonym of Imre Cselenyák
- Robert Montgomery (1807–1855, England, p)
- Henry de Montherlant (1895–1972, France, nf/f/d)
- Isabelle de Montolieu (1751–1832, Switzerland, f)
- Víctor Montoya (born 1958, Bolivia, nf)
- María de Montserrat (1913–1995, Uruguay, f/d/p)
- Jean-Étienne Montucla (1725–1799, France, nf)
- Susanna Moodie (1803–1885, England/Canada, nf)
- Lukas Moodysson (born 1969, Sweden, f/p)
- Elizabeth Moon (born 1945, US, f/nf)
- Geoff Moon (1915–2009, N Zealand, nf)
- Michael Moorcock (born 1939, England/US, f/nf)
- Alan Moore (born 1953, England, f/nf)
- Bai T. Moore (1916–1988, Liberia, p/f/nf)
- C. L. Moore (1911–1987, US, f/d)
- Clement Clarke Moore (1779–1863, US, f/p)
- Francis Moore (1657–1715, England, nf)
- Francis Moore (1708–1756, England, nf)
- G. E. Moore (1873–1958, England, nf)
- George Moore (1852–1933, Ireland/England, f/p/nf)
- John Moore (c. 1595–1647, England, nf)
- Marianne Moore (1887–1972, US, p/nf)
- Merrill Moore (1903–1957, US, p)
- Patrick Moore (1923–2013, England, nf/f)
- Peter Moore (born 1983, England, nf)
- T. C. Kingsmill Moore (1893–1979, Ireland, nf)
- T. Inglis Moore (1901–1978, Australia, f/p/nf)
- Thomas Moore (1779–1852, Ireland/England, p/nf)
- Ward Moore (1903–1978, US, f)
- Wes Moore (born 1978, US, nf)
- Finola Moorhead (born 1947, Australia, f/d/nf)
- Roger Moorhouse (born 1968, England, nf)
- Hortensia von Moos (1659–1715, Switzerland, nf)
- A. S. Mopeli-Paulus (1913 – post-1990s, Basutoland/S Africa, f/nf)
- Ferenc Móra (1879–1934, Hungary, f/nf)
- Pat Mora (born 1942, US, f/nf/ch)
- Dom Moraes (1938–2004, India, nf/p)
- Jesús Moraes (born 1955, Uruguay, f)
- Wenceslau de Moraes (1854–1929, Portugal/Japan, nf/p)
- Karly Gaitán Morales (born 1980, Nicaragua, nf)
- Yuyi Morales (born 1968, Mexico/US, ch)
- Daniel Keys Moran (born 1962, US, f/nf)
- Leandro Fernández de Moratín (1760–1828, Spain, d/p)
- Alberto Moravia (1907–1990, Italy, f/nf)
- Ann Moray (1909–1981, Wales/Mexico, f)
- Aka Morchiladze (born 1966, USSR/Georgia, f/nf)
- Diana Mordasini (living, Senegal/Switzerland, nf)
- Elinor Mordaunt (1872–1942, Australia/England, f/nf), pseudonym of Evelyn May Clowes
- Gertrude More (1606–1633, England/France, nf)
- Hannah More (1745–1833, England, nf/p/d)
- Henry More (1614–1687, England, nf)
- Thomas More (1478–1535, England, nf)
- Jean Moréas (1856–1910, Greece/France, p/nf)
- Hégésippe Moreau (1810–1838, France, p/f)
- Sven Moren (1871–1938, Norway, p/f/ch)
- José Rosas Moreno (1838–1883, Mexico, p/d/ch)
- Kelly Ana Morey (1968–2025, N Zealand, f/p)
- Charles Langbridge Morgan (1894–1958, England, d/f)
- Derec Llwyd Morgan (born 1943, Wales, nf)
- Diana Morgan (1908–1996, Wales/England, d)
- Edwin Morgan (1920–2010, Scotland, p)
- Elaine Morgan (1920–2013, Wales/England, nf)
- Elena Puw Morgan (1900–1973, Wales, f/ch)
- Eluned Morgan (1870–1938, Argentina/Wales, nf)
- Gwenllian Morgan (1852–1939, Wales, nf)
- J. O. Morgan (born 1978, Scotland, p)
- Jeffrey Morgan (living, Canada, nf/f)
- John Morgan (1688–1733 or 1734, Wales/England, nf/p)
- Mal Morgan (1936–1999, Australia, p)
- Nicola Morgan (born 1961, England, f/nf)
- Prys Morgan (born 1937, Wales, nf)
- Sally Morgan (born 1951, Australia, nf/ch/d)
- Sophia Elizabeth De Morgan (1809–1892, England, nf)
- Sydney, Lady Morgan (c. 1781–1859, Ireland/England, f)
- Ted Morgan (1932–2023, France/US, nf)
- Teresa Morgan (born 1968, England, nf)
- William Morgan (1545–1604, Wales, nf)
- William De Morgan (1839–1917, England, f)
- Iolo Morganwg (1747–1826, Wales, nf/p), bardic name of Edward Williams
- Christian Morgenstern (1871–1914, Germany/Austria, p/f/nf)
- Irmtraud Morgner (1933–1990, Germany, nf)
- Daniel Georg Morhof (1639–1691, Germany, nf/p)
- Hiroshi Mori (森博嗣, born 1957, Japan, f/nf)
- Mori Ōgai (森林太郎, 1862–1922, Japan, f/p), pseudonym Mori Ōgai (森鴎外)
- Liane Moriarty (born 1966, Australia, f/ch)
- Zsigmond Móricz (1879–1942, Hungary, f)
- David Richard Morier (1784–1877, Ottoman E/England, nf)
- James Justinian Morier (1782–1849, Ottoman E/England, f)
- Eduard Mörike (1804–1875, Germany, f/p)
- Seiichi Morimura (森村誠一, 1933–2023, Japan, f)
- Edgar Morin (1921–2026, France, nf)
- Hiroyuki Morioka (森岡浩之, born 1962, Japan, f)
- Félix Morisseau-Leroy (1912–1998, Haiti/US, p/d)
- Morita Sōhei (森田草平, 1881–1949, Japan, f)
- Tama Morita (森田たま, 1894–1970, Japan, nf)
- Karl Philipp Moritz (1756–1793, Germany, nf/f)
- David Morley (1923–2009, England, nf)
- David Morley (born 1962, England, nf/d)
- David Morley (born 1964, England, p/nf)
- Henry Morley (1822–1894, England, nf)
- Iris Morley (1910–1953, England, nf)
- John A. Moroso (1874–1957, US, f/nf/p)
- Michael Morpurgo (born 1943, England, p/d/ch)
- Clare Morrall (born 1952, England, f)
- Ronald Hugh Morrieson (1922–1972, N Zealand, f)
- Desmond Morris (1928–2026, England, nf)
- Dick Morris (born 1946, US, nf)
- Gerald Morris (born 1963, US, ch)
- James McGrath Morris (born 1954, US, nf)
- Jan Morris (1926–2020, England/Wales, nf)
- Lewis Morris (1701–1765, Wales, p)
- Lewis Morris (1833–1907, Wales, p)
- Meaghan Morris (born 1950, Australia, nf)
- Myra Morris (1893–1966, Australia, p/f/ch)
- Paula Morris (born 1965, N Zealand, f)
- Rebecca Morris (living, US, f/nf)
- Richard Morris (1703–1779, Wales, nf)
- William Morris (1834–1896, England, p/f/nf)
- John Morris-Jones (1864–1929, Wales, nf/p)
- Arthur Morrison (1863–1945, England, f/nf)
- Blake Morrison (born 1950, England, p/f/nf)
- Jim Morrison (1943–1971, US, p)
- Sally Morrison (born 1946, Australia, f/nf)
- Sophia Morrison (1859–1917, Isle of Man, f/nf)
- Toni Morrison (1931–2019, US, f/nf)
- Di Morrissey (born 1943, Australia, f/ch)
- Michael Morrissey (born 1942, N Zealand, p/f/nf)
- Honoré Willsie Morrow (1880–1940, US, f/nf)
- Petra Morsbach (born 1956, Switzerland/Germany, f)
- Jan Andrzej Morsztyn (1621–1693, Poland-Lithuania/France, p/nf)
- Zbigniew Morsztyn (c. 1628–1689, Poland-Lithuania/Prussia, p)
- Valzhyna Mort (born 1981, USSR/US, p)
- Viggo Mortensen (born 1958, US, p)
- Carole Mortimer (born 1960, England, f)
- Favell Lee Mortimer (1802–1878, England, ch)
- John Mortimer (1923–2009, England, d/nf)
- Penelope Mortimer (1918–1999, Wales/England, nf/f)
- Andrew Morton (born 1953, England, nf)
- Elsie K. Morton (1885–1968, N Zealand, nf)
- Frank Morton (1869–1923, England/Australia, p/nf)
- J. B. Morton (1893–1979, England, nf)
- Hassouna Mosbahi (born 1950, Tunisia, f)
- Johann Michael Moscherosch (1601–1669, Germany, nf)
- Moschus (fl. c. 150 BCE, Syracuse, p)
- Raúl Andrade Moscoso (1905–1983, Ecuador, nf/d)
- Julius Mosen (1803–1867, Germany, p/f)
- Clelia Duel Mosher (1863–1940, US, nf)
- Sam Moskowitz (1920–1997, US, nf)
- Howard Moss (1922–1987, US, p/d/nf)
- Kate Mosse (born 1961, England, f/nf)
- Johann Most (1846–1906, Germany/US, nf/p)
- Ahlam Mosteghanemi (born 1953, Algeria, f)
- Golam Mostofa (1897–1964, India/E Pakistan, p/f/nf)
- Nadežka Mosusova (born 1928, Yugoslavia/Serbia, nf)
- Majede Motalebi (born 1985, Iran, nf)
- Aziz Motazedi (born 1950, Iran, f/nf)
- Andrew Motion (born 1952, England/US, p/f/nf)
- Francis Moto (born 1952, Nyasaland/Malawi, nf)
- Motoori Norinaga (本居宣長, 1730–1801, Japan, nf)
- Ralph Hale Mottram (1883–1971, England, f/p)
- Casey Motsisi (1932–1977, S Africa, f/nf)
- Ralph Hale Mottram (1883–1971, England, f/p)
- Mou Zongsan (牟宗三, 1909–1995, China/Hong Kong, nf)
- Daphne Pochin Mould (1920–2014, England/Ireland, nf)
- John Moultrie (1799–1874, England, p)
- Vasco Graça Moura (1942–2014, Portugal, p/nf/f)
- Ahmed Mourad (born 1978, Egypt, d/f/nf)
- David Mourão-Ferreira (1927–1996, Portugal, p/f)
- Amel Moussa (living, Tunisia, p/nf)
- Salama Moussa (1887–1958, Egypt, nf)
- Mohammed El Moustaoui (born 1943, Morocco, p)
- Johan Andreas Dèr Mouw (1863–1919, Netherlands, p/nf)
- Farley Mowat (1921–2014, Canada, nf)
- Mary Braidwood Mowle (1827–1857, England/Australia, nf)
- Enrique Moya (born 1958, Venezuela, p/f/nf)
- Jojo Moyes (born 1969, England, f/nf)
- Mozi (墨子, c. 470 – c. 391, China, nf)
- Fiona Mozley (born 1988, England, f/nf)
- James Bowling Mozley (1813–1878, England, nf)
- Thomas Mozley (1806–1893, England, nf)

== Mp–My ==
- Samuel Mpasu (1945–2018, Nyasaland/Malawi, nf)
- Phaswane Mpe (1970–2004, S Africa, p/f)
- Es'kia Mphahlele (1919–2008, S Africa, f/nf)
- Samuel Edward Krune Mqhayi (1975–1945, S Africa, d/f/p)
- Lidudumalingani Mqombothi (living, S Africa, f/nf)
- Mohamed Mrabet (born 1936, Morocco, f), pseudonym of Mohammed ben Chaib el Hajam
- Milena Mrazović (1863–1927, Austrian E/Austria, nf)
- Sava Mrkalj (1783–1833, Austrian E, nf/p)
- Zorica Mršević (born 1954, Yugoslavia/Serbia, nf)
- Oswald Mbuyiseni Mtshali (born 1940, S Africa/Soweto, p)
- Fadhy Mtanga (born 1981, Tanzania, f/p)
- Ephrem Mtsire (died c. 1101–1103, Georgia, nf)
- Mu Shiying (穆時英, 1912–1940, China, f/nf)
- Hans Much (1880–1932, Germany, nf/p)
- Robert Muchamore (born 1972, England, f/ch)
- Charles Mudede (born 1969, S Rhodesia/Zimbabwe, d/nf)
- Ian Mudie (1911–1976, Australia, p/nf)
- Mudrooroo (1938–2019, Australia, f/p/d), pseudonym of Colin Thomas Johnson
- Amélia Muge (born 1952, Mozambique, p)
- Malcolm Muggeridge (1903–1990, England, nf)
- Micere Githae Mugo (1942–2023, Kenya, d/nf/p)
- Hazel de Silva Mugot (born 1947, Kenya, f)
- Amir Muhammad (born 1972, Malaysia, nf)
- Malkat al-Dar Muhammad (1920–1969, Sudan, f/nf)
- Penina Muhando (born 1948, Tanzania, d)
- Erich Mühsam (1878–1934, Germany, nf/p/d), Holocaust victim
- Edwin Muir (1887–1959, Scotland, p/f)
- John Kenneth Muir (born 1969, US, nf)
- Kenneth Muir (1907–1996, England, nf)
- Fiston Mwanza Mujila (born 1981, DR of Congo/Austria, f/nf)
- Yolande Mukagasana (born 1954, Rwanda, d/nf)
- Mukai Kyorai (向井去来, 1651–1704, Japan, p/nf)
- Shrawan Mukarung (born 1968, Nepal, p/d)
- Scholastique Mukasonga (born 1956, Rwanda/France, f/nf)
- Mohamed Haji Mukhtar (born 1947, Somalia/US, nf)
- Kuniko Mukōda (向田邦子, 1929–1981, Japan, d/f)
- Dominic Mulaisho (1933–2013, Zambia, f)
- Brandon Mull (born 1974, US, ch)
- Anthony Munday (c. 1560–1633, England, d/p)
- Jan Mulder (born 1945, Netherlands, nf/f)
- Paul Muldoon (born 1951, Ireland, p)
- Lale Müldür (born 1956, Turkey/Belgium, p)
- Wendy Mulford (born 1941, Wales/England, p/nf)
- Alan Mulgan (1881–1962, N Zealand, nf)
- Geoff Mulgan (born 1961, England, nf)
- John Mulgan (1911–1945, N Zealand, nf)
- Clara Mulholland (1849–1934, Ireland, f/nf)
- John Mulholland (born 1940, US, nf)
- Harry Mulisch (1927–2010, Netherlands, f/d/p)
- Brandon Mull (born 1974, US, ch)
- Laura Mullen (born 1958, US, p)
- Adam Müller (1779–1829, Germany/Austria, nf)
- Heiner Müller (1929–1995, Germany, d/p/nf)
- Herta Müller (born 1953, Romania/Germany, f/p/nf)
- Inge Müller (1925–1966, Germany, ch/f/p)
- Maler Müller (1749–1825, Germany, p/d)
- Wilhelm Müller (1794–1827, Germany, p)
- Wolfgang Müller von Königswinter (1816–1873, Germany, f/p)
- Multatuli (1820–1887, Netherlands, f/nf), pseudonym of Eduard Douwes Dekker
- Ivan Matthias Mulumba (born 1987, Uganda, p/f)
- Andreas Munch (1811–1884, Norway, p/f/d)
- Theodor Mundt (1808–1861, Germany, nf/f)
- Charles Mungoshi (1947–2019, S Rhodesia/Zimbabwe, f/p/ch)
- David Mungoshi (1949–2020, S Rhodesia/Zimbabwe, f)
- John Munonye (1929–1999, Nigeria, f)
- Mercedes Negrón Muñoz (1895–1973, Puerto Rico, p/nf)
- Alice Munro (1931–2024, Canada, f)
- Saki (1870–1916, England, f/d/nf), pseudonym of Hector Hugh Munro
- Hugh Andrew Johnstone Munro (1819–1885, Scotland/Italy, nf)
- Robert Munsch (born 1945, US/Canada, ch)
- K. M. Munshi (1887–1971, India, f/nf)
- Haruki Murakami (村上春樹, born 1949, Japan, f/nf)
- Ryū Murakami (村上龍, born 1952, Japan, f/nf)
- Shōfu Muramatsu (村松梢風, 1889–1961, Japan, f)
- Murasaki Shikibu (紫式部), c. 973/978 – c. 1014/1031, Japan, f)
- Kaita Murayama (村山槐多), 1896–1919, Japan, nf)
- Tomoyoshi Murayama (村山知義), 1901–1977, Japan, d/f)
- Iris Murdoch (1919–1999, Ireland/England, f/nf)
- Nina Murdoch (1890–1976, Australia, nf/p), pseudonym Manin
- William Mure (1799–1860, Scotland/England, nf)
- H. A. Murena (1923–1975, Argentina, nf)
- Henri Murger (1822–1861, France, f/p)
- Ben Mutua Jonathan Muriithi (born 1969, Kenya/US, nf), born Jonathan Nyaga
- Rosario Murillo (born 1951, Nicaragua, nf)
- Josip Murn (1879–1901, Austria-Hungary, p)
- Thomas Murner (1475 – c. 1537, Germany/Switzerland, nf/p)
- George Murnu (1868–1957, Ottoman E/Romania, p)
- Murong Xuecun (慕容雪村, born 1974, China, f/nf), pseudonym of Hao Qun (郝群)
- C. E. Murphy (born 1973, US/Ireland, f)
- Edwin Greenslade Murphy (1866–1939, Australia, p/nf)
- Jill Murphy (1949–2021, England, ch)
- Jim Murphy (1947–2022, US, nf/f/ch)
- Margaret Murphy (born 1959, England, f)
- Pat Murphy (born 1955, US, nf/f)
- Richard Murphy (1927–2018, Ireland/England, p/nf)
- Sheila Murphy (born 1951, US, p)
- Timothy L. Murphy (1816–1897, US, nf)
- Andrew Murray (born 1970, England, ch)
- David Christie Murray (1847–1907, England, nf/f)
- Ena Murray (1936–2015, S Africa, f/p)
- George Murray (born 1971, Canada, p)
- Joan Murray (born 1945, US, p/f)
- John Murray (born 1950, England/Greece, f/nf)
- Les Murray (1938–2019, Australia, p/nf)
- Shirley Murray (1931–2020, N Zealand, p)
- Joanna Murray-Smith (born 1962, Australia, d/f)
- Ra'ouf Mus'ad (1937–2025, Sudan/Netherlands, d/f/nf)
- Eugénie Musayidire (born 1952, Rwanda/Germany, nf)
- Tudor Mușatescu (1903–1970, Romania, d/f)
- Johann Karl August Musäus (1735–1787, Germany, f)
- Adolf Muschg (born 1934, Switzerland, f/nf)
- Colin Muset (fl. c. 1210–1250 or 1230–1270, France, p)
- David Musgrave (born 1965, Australia, p/f/nf)
- Susan Musgrave (born 1951, Canada, p/ch)
- Saneatsu Mushanokōji (武者小路実篤, 1885–1976, Japan, f/d/p)
- Sandra A. Mushi (born 1974, Tanzania, p/f)
- Ramlee Awang Murshid (born 1967, Malaysia, f)
- Lukijan Mušicki (1777–1837, Serbia, p/nf)
- Małgorzata Musierowicz (born 1945, Poland, ch/f)
- Robert Musil (1880–1942, Austria/Switzerland, nf/f)
- Lukijan Mušicki (1777–1837, Hungary/Austrian E, p/nf)
- Masimba Musodza (born 1976, S Rhodesia/Zimbabwe, f)
- Alfred de Musset (1810–1857, France, d/p/f)
- Dennis Must (1934–2024, US, f)
- Nikola Musulin (c. 1830 – post-1897, Serbia/Montenegro, nf/p)
- Vera Mutafchieva (1929–2009, Bulgaria, f/nf)
- Čavdar Mutafov (1899–1954, Bulgaria, nf/f)
- Mutesa II of Buganda (1924–1969, Uganda/England, nf)
- Joseph Muthee (born 1928, Kenya, nf)
- Álvaro Mutis (1923–2013, Colombia, p/f/nf)
- Nazar Mohammad Mutmaeen (born 1973, Afghanistan, nf)
- Solomon Mutswairo (1924–2005, S Rhodesia/Zimbabwe, p/f)
- Margaret Mutu (living, N Zealand, nf)
- Vusamazulu Credo Mutwa (1921–2020, S Africa, nf/f)
- Rudolf Muus (1862–1935, Norway, f/d)
- Togara Muzanenhamo (born 1975, S Rhodesia/Zimbabwe, p/d)
- Meja Mwangi (1948–2025, Kenya, f/ch/d)
- Godfrey Mwakikagile (born 1949, Tanzania, nf)
- Ndongolera Mwangupili (born 1977, Malawi, p/f/nf)
- Christopher Mwashinga (born 1965, Tanzania, nf/p)
- Gitura Mwaura (living, Kenya, f/p/ch)
- Lâm Quang Mỹ (1944–2023, Vietnam, p)
- Nyo Mya (1914–1985, Burma, nf)
- Thakin Tin Mya (1924–2015, Burma/Myanmar, nf)
- Valerie Grosvenor Myer (1935–2007, England, nf/f)
- Ben Myers (born 1976, England, f/nf/p)
- Leo Myers (1881–1944, England, f/d)
- Walter Dean Myers (1937–2014, US, ch)
- Julie Myerson (born 1960, England, f/nf)
- Elna Mygdal (1868–1940, Denmark, nf)
- Øyvind Myhre (born 1945, Norway, f)
- Nay Win Myint (born 1952, Burma/Myanmar, f)
- Thant Myint-U (born 1965, US, nf)
- Thein Pe Myint (1914–1978, Burma, nf)
- Agnar Mykle (1915–1994, Norway, f/nf)
- Vincas Mykolaitis-Putinas (1893–1967, Russian E/Soviet Union, p/f)
- Lauren Myracle (born 1969, US, f/ch)
- Jan Myrdal (1927–2020, Sweden, nf)
- Marit Myrvoll (born 1953, Norway, nf)
- Wiesław Myśliwski (1932–2026, Poland, f/nf/d)
