= Marrett =

Marrett may refer to:

- Robert Ranulph Marett (1866-1943), British ethnologist and anthropologist.
- Damian Marrett, writer of non-fiction crime books in Melbourne, Victoria
- George J. Marrett (born 1935), former United States Air Force officer, combat veteran, and test pilot
- Henry Norman Marrett (born 1879), badminton player from England
- Marrett House, historic home in Standish, Maine, USA

== See also ==
- Marett
- Maretto
- Marietta (disambiguation)
- Mariette
- Marriott (disambiguation)
- Merrett
