= Merret =

Merret is a surname. Notable people with the surname include:

- Christopher Merret (1614/1615–1695), English physician and scientist
- Faustine Merret (born 1978), French windsurfer

== See also ==
- Merrett
- Merrit (disambiguation)
