= Adrienne Moore =

Adrienne Moore may refer to:

- Adrienne Kennaway (born 1945), née Moore, New Zealand book illustrator
- Adrienne C. Moore (born 1980), American actress
