= Tsehay =

Tsehay is an Ethiopian feminine given name. Notable people with the name include:

- Tsehay Hawkins (born 2005), Australian dancer and singer
- Tsehay Melaku (born c. 1952), Ethiopian writer
- Tsehay Gemechu (born 1998), Ethiopian athlete
