= East African Junior Library =

The East African Junior Library was a series of illustrated books aimed at primary school readers, published by the Nairobi-based East African Publishing House.

== List of books in the East African Junior Library ==
1. East African How Stories by Pamela Ogot. Illustrated by Terry Hirst. 1966.
2. East African How Stories by Pamela Ogot. Illustrated by Pamela Kola. 1966.
3. Hare's Blanket and Other Tales by Asenath Odaga. Illustrated by Adrienne Moore. 1967.
4. The diamond ring by Asenath Odaga. Illustrated by Adrienne Moore. 1967.
5. The lonely black pig, and other stories by Anne Matindi. 1968.
6. The elephant's heart, and other stories by William Lewis Radford. 1968.
7. The sun and the wind by Anne Matindi. Illustrated by Adrienne Kennaway. 1967.
8. East African When Stories by Pamela Ogot. Illustrated by Beryl Moore. 1968.
9. Cock and lion by Kalondo Kyendo. Illustrated by Adrienne Moore. 1969.
10. Sweets and Sugar cane by Asenath Odaga. Illustrated by Beryl Moore. 1971.
