= Lazy Lion =

1990 children's book by Mwenye Hadithi

Lazy Lion is an African animal story, written by Mwenye Hadithi and illustrated by Adrienne Kennaway, about a lion who wanted a house to keep him dry from the big rain that was coming. It was published in November 1990, by Little, Brown.

== Plot ==
Lazy Lion orders the other animals to build him a house. They do their best, and the lion inspect each one of them, but the houses built are only suitable for their own builders. Refusing to build his own house, the lion has to learn to live in the open, sun or rain.

== Reception ==
Kirkus Reviews called it an "entertaining, brilliantly illustrated 'why' story".
