= Mohammad Daud Miraki =

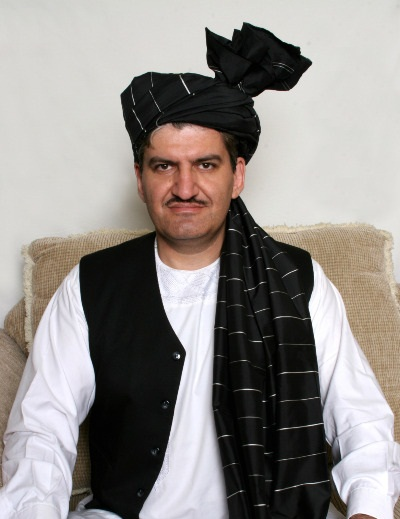
- Born: January 23, 1967; Kabul, Afghanistan
- Occupation(s): Professor, Writer & Political Activist
- Website: http://www.drmirakiforpresident.com http://www.afghanistanafterdemocracy.com

Mohammed Daud Miraki (Pashto: محمد داؤد ميره کی) is an Afghan activist, writer and politician.

== Early life ==
Daud Miraki was born on January 23, 1967, in Kabul, Afghanistan. He belongs to the Sulaimankhail tribe of Maidan Wardak province. Daud Miraki was only 5 years old when his father, General Ghulam Sediq Miraki, was appointed the Intelligence Chief of south and south-western Afghanistan, stationed in Kandahar. He along with his family moved back to Kabul, where they stayed for few years. Escaping the soviet occupation in 1982, Daud and his family took refugee in Peshawar, Pakistan. Afterward he moved to Germany in 1983 where he stayed for a year. In 1984, Daud along with his family moved to Chicago, United States.

== Education ==
Daud Miraki studied up to grade 6 in an elementary school in Kandahar. After completing grading 6 in Kandahar, his family moved back to Kabul where he completed grade 7 and 8. He completed grade 9 at Syed Jamaludin Afghan High School, Peshawar. He received his high school diploma from Senn High School in Chicago, in May, 1986.

Daud was admitted at the University of Illinois, Chicago, where he started to study biology. However, he changed his major to Political Science because of his desires to contribute to the betterment of Afghanistan. In 1992, he graduated with a BA in political science.

Daud Miraki received two master's degree. His first master's degree was in Political Science, specialization in International Relations, which he completed in 1993. His second master's degree was in Middle Eastern Studies, specialization in Conflict Resolution, which he received in 1996. In 2000, he completed his PhD in Public Policy Analysis.

== Work life ==
Daud Miraki taught management and policy courses at the Chicago State University for over three years.

He started a non-for-profit organization, Afghan DU & Recovery Fund to raise awareness and funds to initiate some DU cleanup projects, relocate villagers from bombed villages, and provide clean water and other basic sustenance for the poor people of Afghanistan.

== Academic work ==
Daud Miraki has written several reports, journals and a book.

- Afghanistan after Democracy
- The Anatomy Of America's Defeat In Afghanistan (April 2010) The Anatomy Of America's Defeat In Afghanistan By Mohammed Daud Miraki, MA, MA, PhD

== Political views ==
Daud Miraki is known to be an ultra nationalist Afghan and most of his election goals were focused on giving the ethnic Pashtuns and the Pashto language more rights. According to Mirakai, Pashtuns of Afghanistan make up around 65% of the total population. Thus, Pashto should be proclaimed as the first language of the state while Persian as the second language - not equal. He is also a strong supporter of the removal of Durand Line and formation of Greater Afghanistan (annexation of North-West Frontier Province and Baluchistan Provinces of Pakistan with Afghanistan).

Mirakai is also a staunch criticizer of the NATO forces and their actions/policies in Afghanistan.
