= William Crawford Honeyman =

Scottish musician and author

- Born: William Crawford Honeyman; 1845; Wellington, New Zealand
- Died: 1919 (aged 73–74)
- Citizenship: British
- Occupations: Author, short-story writer, violinist, orchestra conductor
- Writing career
- Pen name: James McGovan
- Genres: detective fiction, non-fiction
- Notable works: Brought to Bay or Experiences of a City Detective, Strange Clues, Solved Mysteries, Traced and Tracked, How to Play the Violin, The Secrets of Violin Playing

William Crawford Honeyman (1845–1919) was a Scottish musician and author.

== Biography ==
William C. Honeyman was born in Wellington, New Zealand in 1845 to Thomas and Eliza Honeyman, who had emigrated from Scotland four years earlier. He was the grandson of minor Scottish poet and songwriter, Adam Crawford. Honeyman returned to Britain with his mother and three siblings in 1849. He was a violinist and orchestra leader who, under his real name, published violin instructional books such as How to Play the Violin and The Secrets of Violin Playing. His daughter Liza was an accomplished violinist who played a Guarnerius made in Cremona in 1742. Sivori (Paganini's only pupil) proclaimed it to be "the finest toned violin in the world."

He was much better known, however, in his own time under his pseudonym, James McGovan (or James M'Govan), a writer of police detective novels.

Readers did not initially realise the works were fiction, but assumed they were true stories in the vein of James McLevy. McGovan's stories were so highly regarded in his own time, that an 1888 Publishers' Circular "proclaimed McGovan’s articles 'the best detective stories (true stories, we esteem them) that we ever met with.'"

Historians believe Edinburgh resident Arthur Conan Doyle was aware of and influenced by McGovan's tales and went on to publish his first Sherlock Holmes story in 1887.

== Miscellaneous works ==
=== Non-fiction ===
- Honeyman, William C. (1890). The Secrets of Violin Playing. Edinburgh: E. Koehler.
- Honeyman, William C. (1890). The Violin : How To Choose One. Edinburgh.
- Honeyman, William C. (1890). The Young Violinist's Tutor and Duet Book : A Collection of Easy Airs, Operatic Selections, and Familiar Melodies. Edinburgh.
- Honeyman, William C. (1898). The Strathspey, Reel, and Hornpipe Tutor. Edinburgh.
- Honeyman, William C. The Secrets of Violin Playing : Being Full Instructions and Hints To Violin Players, For The Perfect Mastery of The Instrument.
- Honeyman, William C. (1899). Scottish Violin Makers : Past and Present. Edinburgh.
- Honeyman, William C. (1883). The Violin : How to Master It / By a Professional Player. Edinburgh.

=== Fiction ===
- Honeyman, William C. (1881). Luckless Peter Pirlie : a humorous Scotch story. Edinburgh.
- McGovan, James (1878). Brought to Bay, or, Experiences of a city detective. Edinburgh.
- McGovan, James (1879). Hunted Down, or, Recollections of a city detective. Edinburgh.
- McGovan, James (1880). Strange Clues, or, Chronicles of a city detective. Edinburgh.
- McGovan, James (1882). Solved Mysteries, or, Revelations of a city detective. Edinburgh.
- McGovan, James (1884). Traced and Tracked, or, Memoirs of a city detective. Edinburgh.
- McGovan, James (1922). Criminals Caught: Records of a city detective. London.
- McGovan, James (1922). The Invisible Pickpocket: Records of a city detective. London.
- McGovan, James (1 October 2003). The McGovan Casebook (trade paperback). Edinburgh: Birlinn Limited MerCat. p. 200. ISBN 978-1841830506.
