= Alicia Miranda Hevia =

Costa Rican writer (born 1952)

- Born: 1952 (age 73–74); San José, Costa Rica
- Education: French and in Spanish philology Doctorate in Latin American literature
- Alma mater: Louisiana State University; University of Costa Rica; University of Sorbonne Nouvelle Paris 3

Alicia Miranda Hevia (born 1952) is a Costa Rican writer. She is known for her literary work, as well as for founding the small press Editorial Montemira.

== Early life and education ==
Born Gladys Alicia Eugenia del Rosario in San José, Costa Rica, in 1952, she was the oldest of five siblings. Her father, who was Costa Rican, and her mother, who was Chilean, were both doctors.

Miranda attended primary school at the Methodist School in San José, then secondary school at the Saint Clare school, where she graduated in 1969. The following year, she left for the United States to begin pre-medical studies at Louisiana State University in Baton Rouge. She returned to Costa Rica a year later, however, and obtained degrees in French and in Spanish philology from the University of Costa Rica in 1976. Immediately thereafter, she traveled to Paris, where she received a doctorate in Latin American literature from the University of Sorbonne Nouvelle Paris 3 in 1981.

During her time at the University of Costa Rica, she participated in student political movements through the youth group known as FAENA, which would later evolve into the Frente Popular Costarricense, a Maoist political party.

== Career ==
Miranda began teaching while still a student at the University of Costa Rica, and she returned to teach grammar at the school after coming back to the country in 1981. She continued to work there until 1985.

She also began writing during her time as a student, including research articles in specialized publications and reported pieces for Diaro de las Palmas in the Canary Islands and Vanguardia Dominical in Bucaramanga, Colombia. On her return to Costa Rica, she wrote for the newspaper La República in San José.

Her first novel, San Isidro, was published in 1980. She published her subsequent novel La huella de abril in 1989. She has also published nonfiction, including Novela, discurso y sociedad in 1985 and Las sílabas azules in 1991.

In 2005, Miranda founded a small press, Editorial Montemira. Miranda is a longtime friend and admirer of the Indian poet Jayanta Mahapatra, and some of his works have been published in Spanish translation by the publishing house.

Miranda has also worked as a translator, including translating such English classics as Romeo and Juliet and Alice's Adventures in Wonderland into Spanish, as well as a translation of a history of Situationist International from French.

== Personal life ==
Miranda met her first husband, the architecture student Manuel Antonio Argüello Rodríguez, during her time as an activist with the FAENA student organization. The couple married in 1976. After their divorce, Miranda remarried, wedding her primary school classmate Eduardo Montes de Oca. The couple had three sons: Sergio, Mauricio, and Bernardo.

== Selected works ==
=== Novels ===
- San Isidro (1980)
- La huella de abril (1989)
- El cinturón de Orión (2013)
- ¿Qué se hicieron las damas? (2019)
- La respiración arrebatada (2020)

=== Nonfiction ===
- Novela, discurso y sociedad (ensayo académico) (1985)
- Las sílabas azules (ensayo literario) (1991)
- Jaque mate en el paralelo 14 (ensayo histórico) (2008)
- Trilogy: El segundo movimiento (2005), La caída brutal (2010), Cosecha de tempestades (2012)
- Vietnam, fénix de sangre y sueños (2015)
- Aotearoa, tierra lejana (2017)
- Palomas procelarias. Doce escritoras (2022)
