= Majede Motalebi =

Iranian author and painter (born 1985)

Majede Motalebi ماجده مطلبی
- Born: 31 October 1985 (age 40); Tehran, Iran
- Occupations: Author, painter, book translator
- Website: Official website (2025 archive)

Maje Motalebi (Persian: ماجده مطلبی; born 31 October 1985) is an Iranian author and painter.

== Biography ==
Majede Motalebi was born in Tehran and studied Fine Arts at the Lotus Educational College in London the University of Fundamental Studies in St. Petersburg. She holds an honors degree in Fine Arts from the Canadian College of Dubai. She had solo painting exhibitions in Suvereto, Italy in both 2014 and 2016. In 2011 and 2012, she won an award for graphics and originality and love and pace, respectively, from Athena Spazio Arte. She was also awarded UNESCO Prizes for both L'avalanch des mots and The Trappist.

Her publications include:

- Wise Animals. AuthorHouse. 2011. ISBN 978-1-467-02662-8.
- A Beautiful Composition from the Wisdom Music System. AuthorHouse. 2011. ISBN 978-1-463-41714-7.
- Wise Animals 2. Authorhouse. 2012. ISBN 978-1-477-21622-4.
- The Trappist. AuthorHouse. 2013. ISBN 978-1-491-81127-6.
- L'avalanche des mots: The avalanche of words. Publishroom. 2016. ISBN 979-1-023-60057-5.
