= Randall V. Martin =

- Occupations: Scientist, engineer, academic and author

Academic background
- Education: BS., Electrical Engineering; MSc., Environmental Change and Management; MS., Engineering Sciences; PhD., Engineering Sciences
- Alma mater: Cornell University; Oxford University; Harvard University

Academic work
- Institutions: Washington University in St. Louis

Randall V. Martin is a scientist, engineer, academic and author. He is the Raymond R. Tucker Distinguished Professor in the Department of Energy, Environmental, and Chemical Engineering, with a courtesy appointment in Computer Science and Engineering at Washington University in St. Louis, McKelvey School of Engineering.

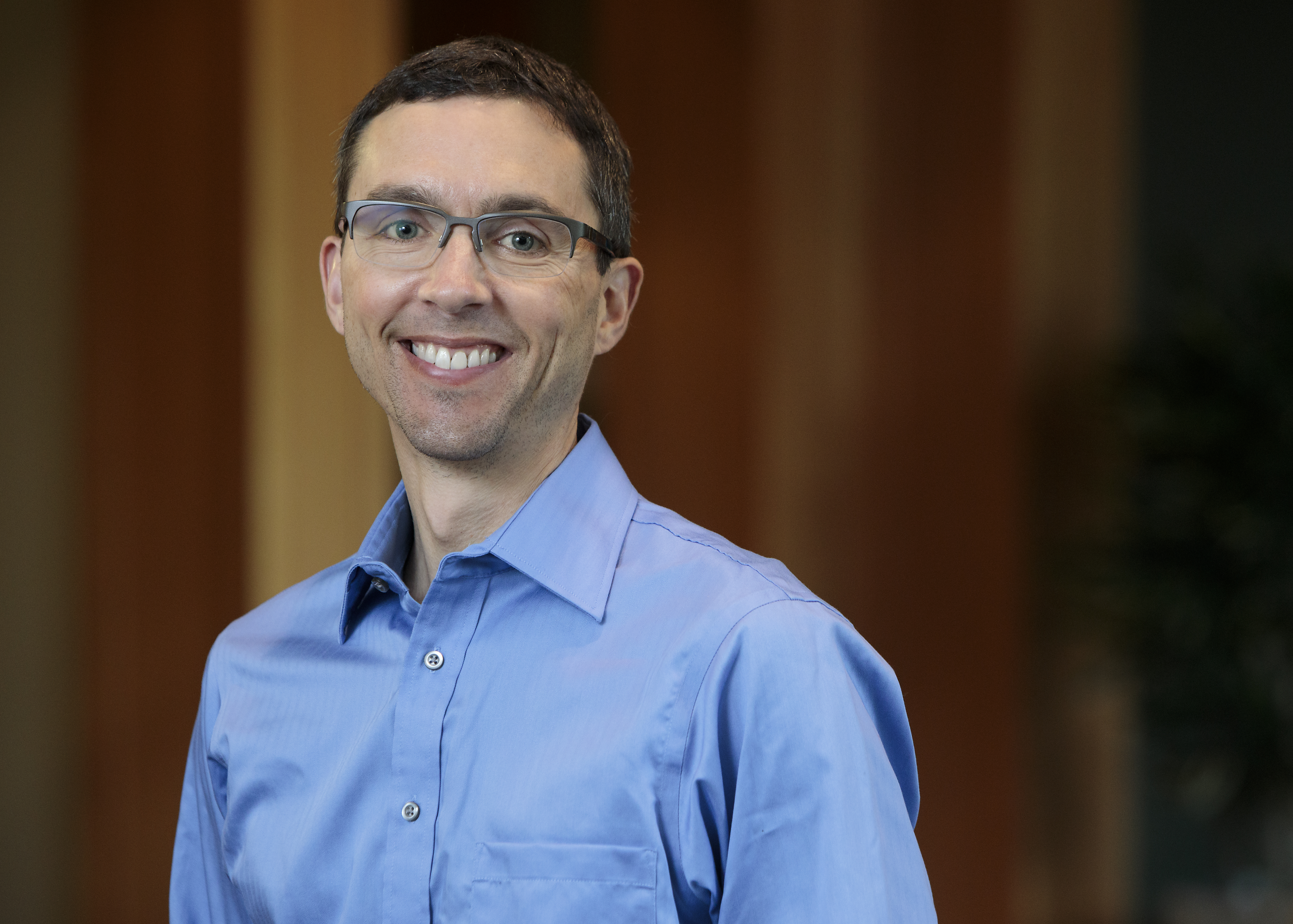

Martin's research focuses on characterizing atmospheric composition to address environmental and public health issues through satellite remote sensing, modeling, and measurements, leading projects such as GEOS-Chem, satellite-derived PM2.5, SPARTAN, and contributing to health and environmental assessments. His publications comprise research articles and a textbook. He was named Highly Cited Researcher by the Web of Science, a highly ranked scholar by ScholarGPS and was listed in the top 25 environmental scientists by Research.com. He has received the 2012 Steacie Memorial Fellowship from the Natural Sciences and Engineering Research Council of Canada, the 2020 American Geophysical Union Atmospheric Sciences Ascent Award, and the 2024 Outstanding Faculty Award from the Washington University Graduate Student Senate.

== Education and early career ==
Martin earned a BS in Electrical Engineering from Cornell University in 1996 followed by an MSc in Environmental Change and Management from Oxford University in 1998. He later received an MS (2001) and PhD (2002) in Engineering Sciences from Harvard University, becoming a Postdoctoral Fellow at the Harvard-Smithsonian Center for Astrophysics from 2002 to 2003.

== Career ==
Martin continued his academic career as an assistant professor of Physics and Atmospheric Science at Dalhousie University in 2003, later becoming associate professor in 2007 and Professor in 2011. He joined Washington University in 2019, and subsequently has been serving as the Raymond R. Tucker Distinguished Professor in the Department of Energy, Environmental, and Chemical Engineering, with a courtesy appointment in Computer Science and Engineering He concurrently was a Research Associate at the Smithsonian Astrophysical Observatory, Harvard-Smithsonian Center for Astrophysics from 2003 to 2021.

Martin has been involved in leadership of the global open-source GEOS-Chem model and its community since 2009, serving as Co-Model Scientist and co-chair of various working groups, including the GEOS-Chem High Performance (GCHP) Working Group, before becoming Model Scientist in 2022. He initiated the development of global satellite-based estimates of fine particulate matter and founded the Surface Particulate Matter Network (SPARTAN) in 2012. In 2019, he joined the NASA Health and Air Quality Applied Sciences Team (HAQAST).

== Research ==
Martin has contributed to the field of environmental engineering and environmental science by studying the processes affecting atmospheric composition and their implications for climate and air quality, utilizing global modeling, satellite retrievals, and targeted ground-based measurements.

=== Atmospheric chemistry ===
In a collaborative study, Martin interpreted satellite observations of tropical tropospheric ozone columns with the GEOS-Chem model, explaining a prominent scientific question known as the tropical Atlantic paradox. Later, he evaluated the sensitivity of atmospheric oxidants to photochemical effects of aerosols not usually included in global models. Furthermore, he interpreted observations of trace-gases from three satellite platforms to provide top-down constraints on the production of nitric oxide by lightning. He also co-led an investigation into the effects of natural ammonia emissions on atmospheric particles and cloud-albedo radiative effects. He led the development and application of methods for inverse modeling of satellite observations to constrain anthropogenic emissions of nitrogen oxides and sulfur dioxide. He led the development of a new generation of the high-performance configuration of GEOS-Chem (GCHP).

=== Satellite remote sensing ===
Martin's work on satellite remote sensing has focused on enhancing the detection and analysis of atmospheric trace gases and aerosols to improve understanding of air quality and climate. He created an algorithm to retrieve the global distribution of tropospheric nitrogen dioxide (NO_{2}) from satellite observations of sunlight reflected from Earth. He further developed a capability for space-based diagnosis of surface ozone sensitivity to anthropogenic emissions. He proposed a method to estimate ground-level NO_{2} concentrations using scaling factors from GEOS-Chem applied to satellite data, validated with ground-based measurements.

In 2017, Martin co-authored the textbook Spectroscopy and Radiative Transfer of Planetary Atmospheres with Kelly Chance, exploring spectroscopy and radiative transfer within atmospheric and planetary science, including knowledge of how stellar or thermal radiation propagates through atmospheres, how that propagation affects radiative forcing of climate, how atmospheric pollutants and greenhouse gases produce unique spectroscopic signatures, how the properties of atmosphere may be quantitatively measured, and how those measurements relate to physical properties. A review published in the Lunar and Planetary Information Bulletin stated, "This book provides this fundamental knowledge to a depth that will leave a student with the background to become capable of performing quantitative research on atmospheres."

=== Global health conditions ===
Martin's research has included investigation into global health conditions as well. In an article that was selected as Paper of the Year by Environmental Health Perspectives, he and colleagues combined remote sensing with information from the GEOS-Chem model to estimate global concentrations of fine particles (PM_{2.5}). He conducted a study to assess the source sector and fuel contributions to ambient PM_{2.5} and attributable mortality across multiple spatial scales, suggesting substantial health benefits from replacing traditional energy sources. Moreover, alongside colleagues, he identified a reversal of trends in global PM_{2.5} air pollution over 1998–2019, which they quantitatively attributed to regional contributions.

== Selected awards and honors ==
- 2012 – E.W.R. Steacie Memorial Fellowship, Natural Sciences and Engineering Research Council of Canada
- 2020 – Atmospheric Sciences Ascent Award, American Geophysical Union
- 2024 – Outstanding Faculty Award, Washington University Graduate Student Senate

== Bibliography ==
=== Books ===
- Spectroscopy and Radiative Transfer of Planetary Atmospheres (2017) ISBN 978-0-19-966210-4

=== Selected articles ===
- Melanie S Hammer; Aaron van Donkelaar; Chi Li; et al. (3 June 2020). "Global Estimates and Long-Term Trends of Fine Particulate Matter Concentrations (1998-2018)". Environmental Science & Technology. doi:10.1021/ACS.EST.0C01764. hdl:11603/26235. ISSN 0013-936X. PMID 32491847.
