= Jerrilyn McGregory =

Professor of African American folklore at Florida State University

Jerrilyn McGregory was a professor of African American folklore at Florida State University and an author. She wrote Wiregrass Country and Downhome Gospel; African American Spriritual Activism in Wiregrass Country. She has been researching celebrations of Boxing Day in the Caribbean.

Stephen Shearon in a 2012 review in American Music described the book as "significant and insightful, but flawed". Her book includes coverage of Maypole plaiting. She died on 6 August 2025.

== Writings ==
- McGregory, Jerrilyn (2012). Downhome gospel : African American spiritual activism in Wiregrass Country. Jackson: University Press of Mississippi. ISBN 9781617033186. OCLC 814407023.
- McGregory, Jerrilyn (1997). Wiregrass country. Folklife in the South series. Jackson: University Press of Mississippi. ISBN 9780878059263. OCLC 1001504094.
- "Spatialized Ontologies: Toni Morrison's Science Fiction Traces in Gothic Spaces" Gothic Science Fiction: 1980-2010. Eds. Sara Wasson and Emily Alder. Liverpool: Liverpool University Press, 2011.
- "'The Rest Is Up to You and Me': Sunday Morning Band and Ritual Identity in the Florida Panhandle." The Florida Folklife Reader. Ed. Tina Bucuvalas. Jackson: University Press of Mississippi, 2011.
- "Fearless Ezekiel: Alterity in the Detective Fiction of Walter Mosley." Finding a Way Home: Critical Essays on Walter Mosley. Eds. Derek Maus and Owen Brady. Jackson; University Press of Mississippi, 2008.
- "Playing in the Dark: Under the Big Top, the Africanist Presence." The Many Faces of Circus. Ed. Robert Sugarman. London: Cambridge Scholars Press, 2007.
- "Nalo Hopkinson's Approach to Speculative Fiction." FEMSPEC, Vol. 6.1, 2005: 3-17.
- "The Old Ship of Zion; The Afro-Baptist Ritual in the African Diaspora"
