= Merrett R. Stierheim =

American public administrator (1933–2024)

Steirheim (left) with County Mayor Alex Penelas in 1998

Merrett R. Stierheim (September 25, 1933 – July 7, 2024) was an American public administrator in the public sector in Miami-Dade County, Florida, from 1959 until his death in 2024.

== Education and early career ==
Stierheim was an Air Force cadet graduate and served as a First Lieutenant Navigator from 1953 to 1957. He graduated third in his class with a master's degree in Governmental Administration from the Wharton School of the University of Pennsylvania and earned a Bachelor of Science in Commerce and Finance from Bucknell University, where, upon graduation, he was awarded the Outstanding Student Achievement Award from the Wall Street Journal.

Stierheim interned and later served as Assistant City Manager in Miami from 1959 to 1967; as Clearwater City Manager from 1967 to 1973; and Pinellas County Administrator from 1973 to 1976.

== Career as County Manager of Miami-Dade County ==
=== 1976–1986 ===
Stierheim first served as County Manager from 1976 to 1986 and successfully supervised a $5 billion countywide infrastructure expansion including the construction of Miami Metro Zoo, the downtown library and cultural complex, the Government Center, several regional parks, libraries, water, sewer and solid waste facilities, and the county's mass transit system - Metrorail and Metromover. He also dealt with a number of events with national repercussions when the community assimilated more than 160,000 refugees from Cuba (the Mariel Exodus) and Haiti. In 1980, he helped restore law and order after severe civil disturbances and joined community leaders to address the social inequities that sparked the disturbances. Many of those programs are still in place today.

=== 1998–2001 ===
In March 1998, he was asked to return to Miami-Dade County to manage a scandal-ridden, demoralized county government with a $4.5 billion budget, 28,000 employees, and 42 departments, including Miami International Airport, the Port of Miami, transportation, water and sewer, health and human services, police and fire.

== CEO of the Women's Tennis Association 1986–1989 ==
After nearly ten years as County Manager, Stierheim was recruited as President/CEO of the Women's Tennis Association, which included Chris Evert, Martina Navratilova, Pam Shriver and other tennis professionals. As CEO, Stierheim was credited with making women's professional tennis more international in its scope, doubling prize money, expanding the tiered feeder system of professional tournaments and establishing a player's pension plan.

Stierheim worked with Butch Buchholz to move the Lipton International Players Championships tennis tournament to Key Biscayne in 1987.

== CEO of the Greater Miami Convention & Visitors Bureau 1990–1998 ==
In 1990, Stierheim was appointed President and CEO of the Greater Miami Convention & Visitors Bureau, a marketing, not-for-profit organization with 1,100 corporate members whose mission is to promote Miami-Dade County as a convention, business and leisure destination. Working with government and industry leaders, Stierheim established the Bureau's first dedicated advertising fund with a value exceeding $5 million. When crimes against tourists in 1993 threatened the community's number one industry, Stierheim lobbied for more tourist signs, law enforcement programs and community awareness of the importance of the visitor industry.

During the boycott of the visitor industry by the African-American community, he established the Visitor Industry Human Resource Development Council (VIC), a private, not-for-profit organization working to increase the economic participation of African-Americans at management and professional levels in the local visitor industry through hospitality scholarships. Today, the VIC has awarded over 100 college scholarships and raised well over $1 million from the visitor industry.

Stierheim's efforts led to Miami-Dade experiencing its best tourism years ever in 1995, 1996, and 1997. For his work, he was awarded the 1996 Tourism Professional of the Year by the local visitor industry, and in 1997 he completed the required courses from Purdue and Calgary universities to become a Certified Destination Management Executive.

== City Manager of the City of Miami 1996–1996 ==
After top Miami officials were indicted in a kickback scheme at City Hall in 1996 Stierheim, on loan from the GMCVB, was brought in in September and served pro bono as interim City Manager of the City of Miami, for two months, where he uncovered a $68 million shortfall in a once approved bogus city budget. He then led a recovery effort, enlisting over forty pro bono private and public sector executives in thirteen task forces and presented a financial recovery plan to the City that is still being followed. The previous city manager, Cesar Odio, was later convicted of bribery and went to prison. More recently, Stierheim completed a similar pro bono financial review at the request of the Homestead Mayor and Council.

== Town Manager Miami Lakes 2001 ==
He served as the first interim Town Manager of the newly formed Town of Miami Lakes for two months. While conducting a national search for a permanent Manager, he led the Council through a strategic planning process and prepared the Town's first two budgets.

== Superintendent of Miami-Dade County Public Schools 2001–2004 ==
Stierheim was named Superintendent of Miami-Dade County Public Schools in October 2001. The school board hired him after a land-acquisition scandal left his predecessor, Roger Cuevas, without a job and the board without the trust of the public. He served until June 30, 2004.

== Later life and death ==
In 2004, Stierheim joined Wetherington, Klein and Hubbart as a mediator. He shared office space with attorney Hugo Black, Jr., son of the former US Supreme Court Justice Hugo Black.

Merrett Stierheim was unanimously approved by the City of Doral Council to be hired as the new City Manager. The vote took place at a special meeting held on December 4, 2012.

Stierheim died on July 7, 2024, at the age of 90.

== Miscellaneous ==
In 1998, Stierheim received an Honorary Doctor of Laws degree from Barry University in Miami, Florida. Stierheim was the recipient of numerous local, national and international awards. He was involved in or was a principal founder of major Miami-Dade civic and municipal institutions including, the Beacon Council, the GMCVB, and Metro Miami Action Plan (MMAP). He served on the board of directors of more than 30 local, state and national organizations including Barnett Bank, SunBank, Travel Industry of America (TIA), International Association of Convention & Visitors Bureaus (IACVB), United States National Tourism Organization (NTO 10) and the United Way of Miami-Dade County. He was a member of the Orange Bowl Committee and served on the following Boards: YMCA, Zoological Society, Collins Center for Public Trust, The Beacon Council, Greater Miami Chamber of Commerce, GMCVB, and Mellon National Bank. He was a lifetime member of the International City and County Management Association and was the Chair and lectured at the Academy for Strategic Management at FIU. He also held a Florida Real Estate license and was certified by the American Arbitration Association to serve on the Complex Arbitration Panel.

In 2003, Stierheim was a National Public Service Award winner. The awards are presented jointly by The American Society for Public Administration and The National Academy of Public Administration to recognize outstanding practitioners who have spent most of their careers in public service.

Stierheim was married to Judy Cannon and had four daughters, Laurey, Cathy, Mia and Paula. He also frequented Royal Palm Tennis Club in Pinecrest, Florida, where he held membership.

There is a Merrett R. Stierheim Urban Affairs Department at the Miami-Dade Public Library System.
