= Merrett =

Merrett is a surname. Notable people with the surname include:

- Charles Merrett (1863–1948), Australian merchant, agriculturist, politician
- Daniel Merrett (born 1984), Australian rules footballer with Brisbane Lions
- Henry Merrett (1886–1954), Australian rules footballer
- Jackson Merrett (born 1993), Australian rules football player
- John Campbell Merrett (1909–1998), Canadian architect of Montreal's Central Station
- Lara Merrett (born 1971), Australian visual artist
- Leo Merrett (1920–1976), Australian rules footballer for the Richmond Football Club
- Mitch Merrett, Canadian record producer
- Nigel Merrett (born 1940), ichthyologist, with British Natural History Museum
- Paul Merrett, celebrity chef in Godalming
- Roger Merrett (born 1960), Australian rules footballer in the Victorian Football League
- Thorold Merrett (born 1933), Australian rules footballer in the Victorian Football League
- Zach Merrett (born 1995), Australian rules football player

== See also ==
- Christopher Merret (16 February 1614/1615 – 19 August 1695), also spelt Merrett
- Merrett–Murray Medal awarded annually to the player adjudged the Brisbane Lions Club Champion of the season
- Merrett R. Stierheim, public administrator in the public sector in Miami-Dade County from 1959 to 2004
