= Razaq Mamoon =

Afghan politician

Razāq Mamoon
- رزاق مامون
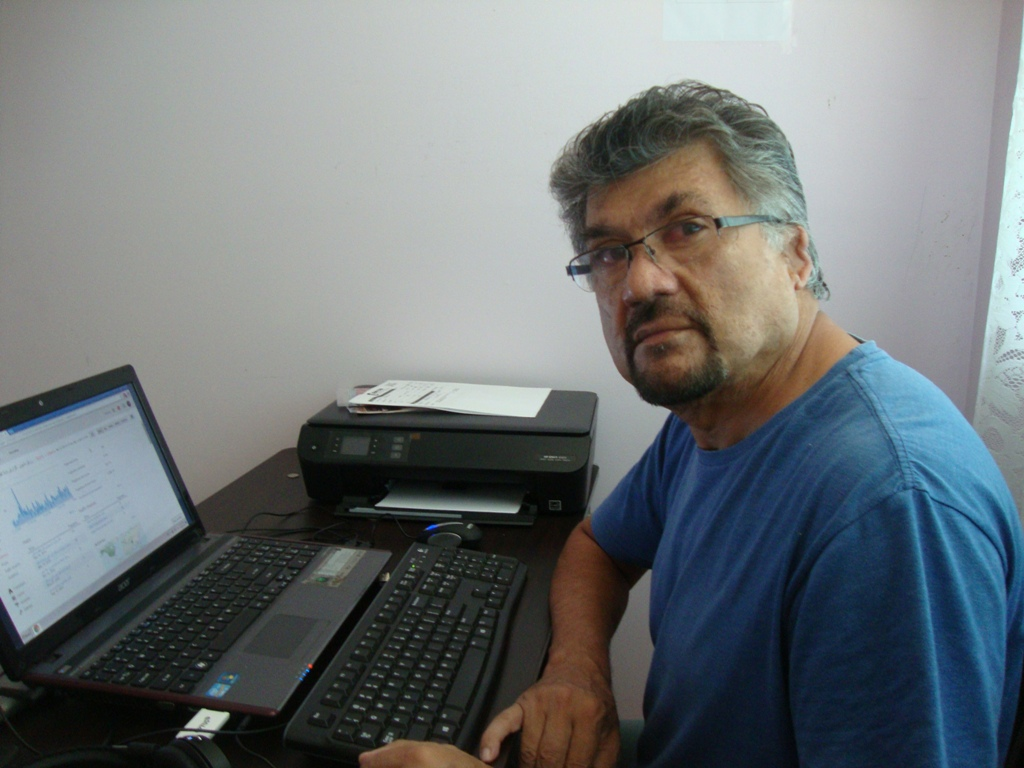
- Born: December 27, 1964 (age 61); Parwan, Afghanistan
- Occupations: Author; Analyst; Journalist
- Known for: Journalism, Writing and Political Analysis
- Website: razaqmamoon.blogspot.com

Razāq Mamoon (Persian: رزاق مأمون; born December 27, 1964) is an author, political analyst and journalist from Afghanistan. He is currently living in Australia since November 2014.

== Career ==
Razaq Mamoon is one of Afghanistan's most prominent journalists and authors. He was the director of the Bust-i-Bastan News Agency. He has worked in the past for BBC Persian Radio and was the chief editor of Radio Free Europe/Radio Liberty (RFE/RL) in Kabul. Mamoon has also hosted a popular political television show on Tolo TV, where he interviewed famous personalities.

Razaq Mamoon has written a total of 21 books of different genres including literature, history and politics. He is a fierce critic of the politics of Iran and Pakistan as well as certain Afghans who are pro-Iranians. In January 2011, Mamoon became the victim of an acid attack in which he accused Iran for being involved. He has recently written a new book Rad-i-Pai-Firaaon (Footprint of Pharaoh), about Iranian politics and their interfering role in Afghanistan. President Hamid Karzai strongly condemned the attack on Mamoon, ordering the perpetrators to be brought to justice. The attacker was arrested a few days later by the Afghan National Police at which point he confessed to committing the crime. During the confession, the accused criminal stated that several men with Iranian accents forced him to throw acid on Mamoon's face. He made his blog after his treatment was finished in India.

"If I hadn't attacked Mamoon, the lives of my wife and children would have been in danger."

— Khwaja Abdul Rafi (a resident and national of Afghanistan. He is also allegedly described as the accused criminal), January 24, 2011

On February 28, 2011, He made his YouTube channel and named it "جمهوری پنجم," meaning "Fifth Republic" in English, where he does his commentary on mainly Afghan politics.
