= Anne Matindi =

Kenyan nurse and children's writer (born 1942)

- Born: January 1, 1942
- Died: June 8, 2023 (aged 81)
- Citizenship: Kenya
- Occupation: Writer

Anne-Rose Waruguru Matindi (born 1942) is a Kenyan nurse and children's writer, known for her plays aimed at elementary school children.

== Life ==
Anne Matindi was born in Murang'a District, Kenya, and was educated at Nginda Girls' School and Kahuhia Girls' School. By the time her first collection of stories was published in 1967, she was married with three children.

Matindi's stories, set in East Africa, are often amusing traditional stories about domestic animals.

== Works ==
- The sun and the wind. Nairobi : East African Publishing House, 1967. Illustrations by Adrienne Moore. East African junior library, no. 7.
- The lonely black pig, and other stories. Nairobi: East African Publishing House, 1968. East African junior library, no. 5.
- Jua na Upepo; na hadithi nyingine. Nairobi: East African Pub. House, 1968. Hadithi za kikwetu, 3. (Short story in Swahili.)
- (with Cynthia Hunter) The sun-men and other plays. Nairobi: East African Publishing House, 1971. Illustrations by Beryl Moore. Plays for primary schools, 1.
- The Kasiwes and their animals, and other stories. Nairobi : Phoenix, 1996. Illustrations by Emmanuel Kariuki. Phoenix young readers library.
