= Sagi Melamed =

Israeli fundraising executive (born 1965)

- שגיא מלמד
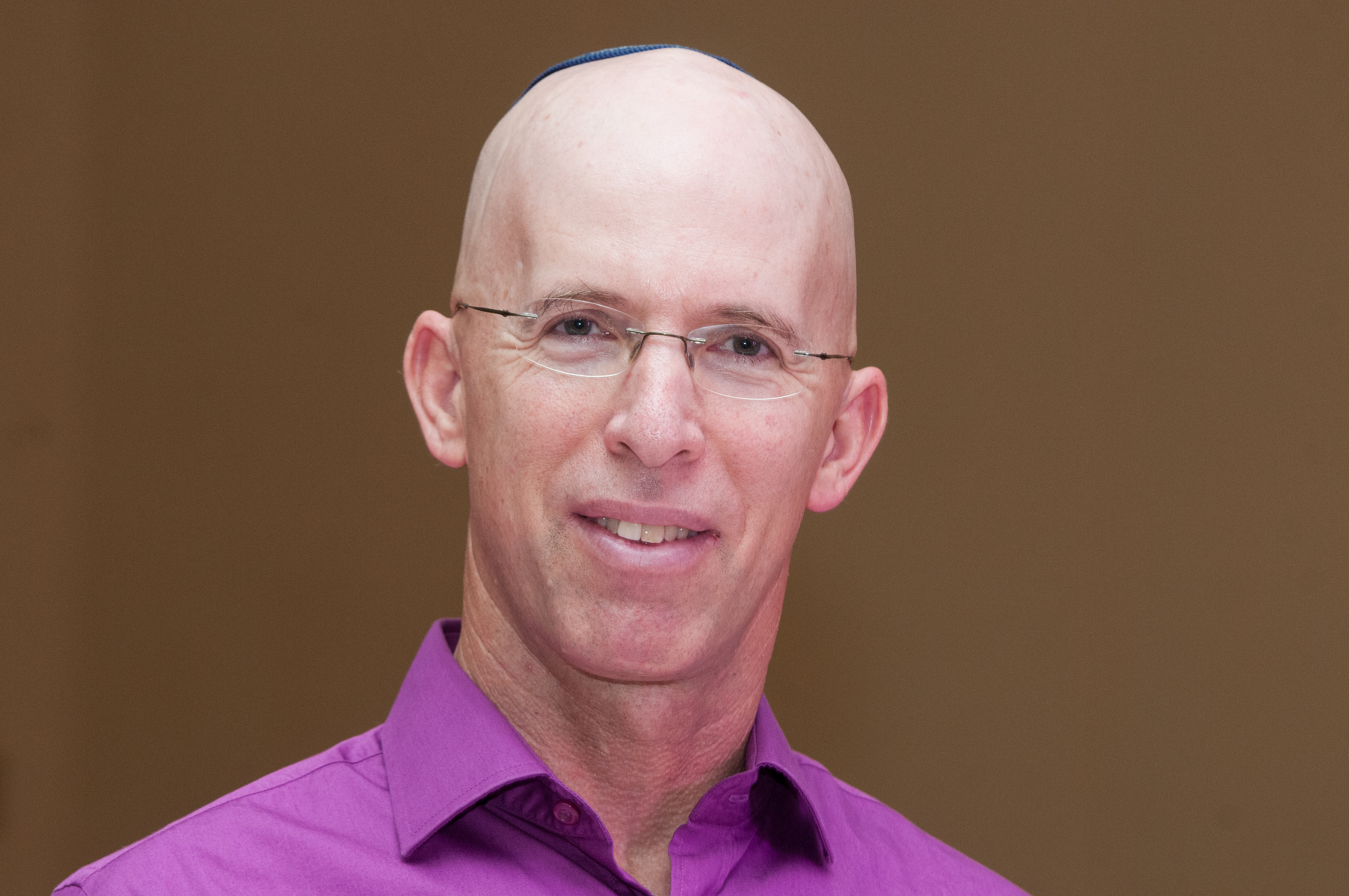
- Born: 1965 (age 60–61); Ramat Yohanan, Israel
- Education: Harvard University, University of Haifa
- Spouse: Betsy
- Children: 4
- Website: https://www.sagimelamed.com/

Sagi Melamed (Hebrew: שגיא מלמד; born 1965) is an Israeli fundraising executive, a writer, an author, and a karate instructor. He is chief development officer at the Israel Antiquities Authority and promotes interfaith and intercultural relations between Israel and the Diaspora, and between Jews and other cultures and religions.

== Early life and education ==
Sagi Melamed was born and raised on Kibbutz Ramat Yohanan, third generation descendant of founders of the kibbutz. His grandparents on both sides made Aliyah to Israel from Europe. His grandmother's brother, Pinchas Sapir, was Israel's third Minister of Finance. In the Israel Defense Forces, he served in the Armored Corps (1984 – 1988). In his final position during his regular army service he commanded the Rahaf unit. In the Reserves he was a liaison officer with the Jordanian Armed Forces and held the rank of captain.

Melamed earned his MA degree in Middle Eastern Studies with a specialty in Conflict Resolution from Harvard University (1996). He graduated with a BA in Middle Eastern History from the University of Haifa (1994) and is a graduate of the Executive Business Management program of the Israel Management Center (2008). While at Harvard, Melamed initiated The Harvard Middle East Career Directory (1994 – 1996), a project connecting businesses in the field of the Middle East and potential employees. At Harvard he was a board member of The Middle East University.

== Career ==
In 1998, Melamed and his family returned to Israel. Between 1998 and 2003 he managed Partnership 2000 between the Jewish community of Cleveland and the Beit She’an region community, under the auspices of the Jewish Agency. Continuing his work in Beit She'an, he set up The Jordan Valley Cross-Border Cooperation Center to encourage economic and social cooperation between Israel and Jordan. Melamed was the Vice President of External Relations and Development at Tel-Hai Academic College (2003 – 2009), then was CEO of Global Resource Development at Bar-Ilan University (2009 – 2010).

Between 2010-2021 he was Vice President of External Relations and Development at the Max Stern Yezreel Valley College. As part of his role at the College he was one of the founders of the Galilee Center for Studies in Jewish-Christian Relations. Since 2022 he is Chief Development Officer at the Israel Antiquities Authority.

Melamed, a 4th Dan black belt, has studied Shotokan karate since 1989, training under Sensei Serge Chouraqui (9th Dan). In 2003 he founded the Shotokan Karate Club at Hoshaya, where he lives, and was its chief instructor until 2013. He is a member of the Board of Directors of Budo For Peace, which uses martial arts as a way to bring together Jews and Arabs and to break down stereotypes.

Since 2006 Melamed has written articles for various newspapers and websites, including The Times of Israel,Cleveland Jewish News, Canadian Jewish News, The Jewish Journal of Greater Los Angeles, St Louis Light, Virtual Jerusalem, Bridges for Peace, and Israel Hayom.

In 2012, his book Benartzi was published by Achiasaf Publishing. The book takes a personal look at a range of subjects and challenges that face Israel and the Jewish people, among them Jewish-Arab relations, relations between Jews in Israel and Jews in the Diaspora, the IDF, issues of peace, ethics and war, and economic and social topics. In 2013, the English language version was published under the title Son of My Land. Melamed delivers talks to Jewish and Christian communities around the world on these topics and others.

In February 2016 he was elected President of the Harvard Club of Israel. In 2016, his book Fundraising: The Practical Israeli Guide was published by Matar Publishing House. His book Mindful Fundraising was published by Gefen Publishing House in 2021, and includes a chapter on Fundraising During Crisis written during the COVID-19 pandemic.

== Personal life ==
Since 1998, Sagi Melamed has lived in Hoshaya in the Lower Galilee. He is married to Betsy and is the father of four children.
