= Nicholas Michell =

English poet (1807–1880)

- Born: 4 June 1807; Calenick, near Truro, Cornwall, England
- Died: 6 April 1880 (aged 72); Falmouth, England
- Occupation: Poet

Nicholas Michell (4 June 1807 – 6 April 1880), was a Cornish writer, best known for his poetry.

== Personal life ==
Michell, born at Calenick, near Truro, Cornwall, a son of John Michell (1774–1868), who was known as the "father of the tin trade", a tin smelter and chemist, and one of the discoverers of tantalite. After attending Truro Grammar School, Michell was employed in the office of his father's smelting works at Calenick, and afterwards in London. He married, on 3 August 1836, Maria Waterhouse; she died in Penzance on 9 June 1887, aged 74. Michell himself died in Tehidy Terrace, Falmouth, on 6 April 1880, and was buried in St. Kea churchyard on 12 April.

== Career ==
He wrote poems from an early age; was encouraged by Thomas Campbell and other literary men, and contributed to the Forget-me-not, the Keepsake, and other annuals. But it was not till after the publication of his Ruins of Many Lands in 1849 that Michell succeeded in attracting much public attention. This work supplies poetical descriptions of nearly all the existing remains of ancient people and kingdoms in the old and new world. His next work, produced in 1853, was the Spirits of the Past, a title altered in a subsequent edition to Famous Women and Heroes.

The Poetry of Creation followed in 1856, and Pleasure, a poem in the heroic measure, appeared in 1859, with sketches and tales introduced. The Immortals, or Glimpses of Paradise, was composed in 1870 in Cornwall, and is the most imaginative of the author's productions. Sibyl of Cornwall, a story in verse, deals with love and adventure, the scene being laid on the north coast of his native county. He also wrote several novels, but these did not obtain so large a circulation as his poems.

== Other works ==
Besides the works already mentioned, Michell was the author of:

- The Siege of Constantinople, with other Poems, 1831
- Living Poets and Poetesses, a Biographical and Critical Poem, 1832
- An Essay on Woman, 1833
- The Saxon's Daughter, a Tale of the Crusades, 1835
- The Fatalist, or the Fortunes of Godolphin, 3 vols. 1840
- The Traduced, an Historical Romance, 3 vols. 1842
- The Eventful Epoch, or the Fortunes of Arthur Clive, 3 vols. 1846
- London in Light and Darkness, with all the Author's Minor Poems, now first collected, 1871
- The Heart's Great Ruler, a Poem, and Wanderings from the Rhine to the South Sea Islands, 1874
- Nature and Life, including all the Miscellaneous Poems with many Original Pieces, 1878.

A collected edition of his Poems appeared in 1871.
