= Peter Moore (historian) =

British historian, lecturer and podcaster (born 1983)

Peter Moore (born 1983) is a British historian, lecturer and podcaster.

== Career ==
Moore studied at Durham University, then lived in Madrid before beginning an MA in non-fiction writing at City, University of London.

His first book, Damn His Blood, is a non-fiction account of the Oddingley Murders.

Moore's second book, The Weather Experiment, tells the story of the invention of the modern weather forecast through the life of its founder, Robert FitzRoy. It was chosen by The New York Times as one of the 100 Notable Books of 2015.

In 2018, Endeavour, was published. It narrates the history of the HM Bark Endeavour, the ship James Cook sailed on his first voyage to the South Seas (1768–1771). Endeavour was a Sunday Times bestseller.

Moore teaches creative writing at the University of Oxford and presents a history podcast called Travels Through Time.
