= Tsehay Melaku =

Ethiopian writer (born c. 1952)

Tsehay Melaku (Amharic: ፀሐይ መላኩ; born c. 1952) is an Ethiopian writer. She has been called the first contemporary Ethiopian woman novelist, part of a wave of women writers who entered the literary scene in the early 1990s.

== Early life and teaching career ==
Tsehay was born and grew up in Addis Ababa, in a family of 11 children. Her father was a priest, and he also fought against the Italian occupation of Ethiopia. He died suddenly when she was in high school, so she completed a brief teacher training program and obtained a teaching job to help support her family. She went on to work as a high school teacher for over two decades.

During her time as a teacher, Tsehay also spent 10 years volunteering for Legedadi Radio, producing a show on women's empowerment.

== Writing ==
After many years, Tsehay retired from teaching to pursue writing. She was the first in a new generation of women who began to populate the Eritrean literary scene around 1990. Her work is written in Amharic.

Her first novel, Qusa, was published in 1989. It was a success, but she went into debt with the release of her subsequent novel Anguz, which dealt with the Red Terror, because it was released amid the turmoil after the end of the Derg regime and failed to sell.

Tsehay continued to publish subsequent novels throughout the 1990s and into the 2000s, including Bes Rahel in 1996, Em’minete in 2002, and Ye Petros Wazema in 2005. She also began writing poetry, releasing the collection Yesimet Tikusat in 2002.

Her work deals with social and political issues, including women's role in society, as well as the legacy of the Derg's rule.

With her early academic career cut short due to her father's death, Tsehay returned to school in her retirement, graduating with a degree in business education from Addis Ababa University.

Tsehay previously served as president of the Zema Beir Ethiopian Women Writers Association. She has also been involved with the Gondar Development and Cooperation Organization.

== Personal life ==
Tsehay's husband, Brigadier General Tariku Ayne, was killed by the Derg regime in 1987. She has two daughters and two grandchildren.

== Selected works ==
=== Novels ===
- Qusa ("Revenge," 1989)
- Anguz (“Scar,” 1992)
- Bes Rahel (“Rahel the Leper,” 1996)
- Em’minete (“Head Nun,” 2002)
- Yeniseha Shengo (“Court of Confession,” 2004)
- Ye Petros Wazema ("Eve of Petros," 2005)

=== Poetry ===
- Yesimet Tikusat ("The Fever of Emotion," 2002)
