= Adrienne Kennaway =

Illustrator and children's book author

- Born: 1945 (age 80–81); Kenya
- Occupations: illustrator and writer of children's picture books
- Awards: Greenaway Medal (1987)

Adrienne Prudence Kennaway (born 1945) was an illustrator and writer of children's picture books. She won the 1987 Kate Greenaway Medal from the Library Association, recognising the year's best children's book illustration by a British subject.

== Information ==
Adrienne Prudence Moore grew up "all over the world". She was raised partly in Kenya, a background that informed her early work, such as Game Park Holiday (1967) and The Elephant's Heart and other stories (1968), which she illustrated as Adrienne Moore. Those two 38-page picture books were written by William Lewis Radford and published by East Africa Publishing House of Nairobi in the East African Readers Library series. The US Library of Congress catalogues 12 books she illustrated as "Adrienne Moore" from 1966 to 1972.

Kennaway became notably successful with animal folk-tales retold by Mwenye Hadithi, portraying African wildlife with vivid watercolour pictures, including Greedy Zebra (1984) and Crafty Chameleon (1987), the latter of which received the Greenaway Medal. The Horn Book Magazine named Hot Hippo (1986) and Crafty Chameleon (1987) among the years' best children's books. Kennaway's later work has covered animal tales and natural history from across the world, as both illustrator and writer.

Kennaway resided in County Kerry, Ireland. She died on 12 September 2025 and is buried in the Church of Ireland Cemetery, Templenoe, Co Kerry, Ireland.

== Selected works ==
=== As illustrator ===
- Radford, William Lewis (1967). Game Park Holiday. East African Publishing House.
- Radford, William Lewis (1968). The Elephant's Heart and Other Stories. East African Publishing House.
- Gagg, J. C. (1978). Making This Book. Basil Blackwell.
- Hadithi, Mwenye (1984). Greedy Zebra. Little, Brown and Company.
- Hadithi, Mwenye (1986). Hot Hippo. Little, Brown and Company. ISBN 978-0-316-33722-9.
- Hadithi, Mwenye (1987). Crafty Chameleon. Little, Brown and Company.
- Hadithi, Mwenye (1988). Tricky Tortoise. Little, Brown and Company. ISBN 978-0-316-33724-3.
- Mwalimu (1989). Awful Aardvark. Little, Brown and Company.
- Hadithi, Mwenye (1990). Lazy Lion. Little, Brown and Company.
- Maddern, Eric (1990). Curious Clownfish. Little, Brown and Company.
- Hadithi, Mwenye (1993). Baby Baboon. Little, Brown and Company. ISBN 978-0-316-33729-8.
- Maddern, Eric (1993). Rainbow Bird: An Aboriginal Folktale from Northern Australia. Little, Brown and Company. ISBN 0-316-54314-4.
- Hadithi, Mwenye (1994). Hungry Hyena. Little, Brown and Company. ISBN 0-316-33715-3.
- Moss, Miriam (2000). This is the Tree. Kane Miller. ISBN 0-916291-98-7.
- Moss, Miriam (2004). Jungle Song. Frances Lincoln. ISBN 1-84507-039-9.
- Moss, Miriam (2007). This is the Reef. Frances Lincoln. ISBN 978-1-84507-573-6.
- Hadithi, Mwenye (2008). Laughing Giraffe. Hodder & Stoughton. ISBN 0-316-33715-3.
- Moss, Miriam (2011). This is the Mountain. Frances Lincoln. ISBN 978-1-84507-984-0.
- Hadith, Mwalimu (2006). Awkward Aardvark. Hodder Children’s Books. ISBN 0-340-52581-9.

=== As writer and illustrator ===
- Kennaway, Adrienne (1991). Bushbaby. Little, Brown and Company. ISBN 0-316-48890-9.
- Kennaway, Adrienne (1992). Little Elephant's Walk. HarperCollins. ISBN 0-06-020377-3.

== See also ==
- Fable
