= Damian Marrett =

Australian writer

Damian Marrett (born in Melbourne) is an Australian non-fiction crime writer and a former undercover police detective with the Victoria Police force.

== Career ==
He has appeared on numerous television and radio programs as a crime commentator and is also a freelance writer. He has worked on various crime series including Channel Nine's television show Stinger. A scene from his book Undercover was reenacted as part of the Seven Network's Gangs of Oz television series. He has coproduced various TV programs including Police Under Fire which screened on the Seven Network in 2010.

Director Torus Tammer and Oscar-nominated producer Daniel Dubiecki optioned the best-selling Australian true crime novels "Undercover" and "White Lies". Tammer and Dubiecki are currently developing the feature film adaptation of "Undercover" in partnership with Screen Australia. Marrett is also a director of Community Against Crime.

== Media ==
Marrett has created and developed several TV concepts, including Police Under Fire, a three part true crime series for channel 7 and produced by CornerBox Productions. The series included - The Walsh Street murders and Mad Max.

He also created a children's TV program named 'Match It' than aired for 4 years on the 7 Network. (also produced by CornerBox Productions).

He has assisted as talent on two Australia 60 minutes sting episodes, as an under cover operative titled 'Love Trap' filmed in Malaysia and 'Black Dollars' filmed in Thailand.

Marrett has also appeared on several true crime series including 'Gangs of Oz' Inside the Mafia. He has been a crime commentator on numerous TV programs including 'The Circle', 'The Project', 'Today Tonight', 'ACA', '7.30 Report', 'Sunrise' and the 'Today Show'

Marrett has had a regular crime show on Community Radio and Triple M Melbourne.

He has also had several crime articles published in the Herald Sun.

== Legal issues ==
In January 2014, Marrett pleaded guilty to procuring a serving Victoria Police officer friend to disclose confidential information from the police database for a fellow private investigator. The officer did not provide the information to him to locate a woman and he did not pass anything onto the private investigator. Unbeknownst to him was that the client was the father of the woman, and that the daughter had an intervention order on him.

== Books ==
- Undercover published 2005 Harper Collins
- White Lies published 2006 Harper Collins
- Wired published 2007 UCIC press
