= Jensen Steam Engines =

Maker of steam powered toys based in US

- Company type: Private
- Industry: Toys
- Founded: 1932
- Founder: Tom Jensen Sr.
- Headquarters: Jeannette, PA, USA
- Area served: Worldwide
- Key people: Tom Jensen Sr 1901–1992, Tom Jensen Jr
- Products: Toy steam engines

Jensen Steam Engines is a manufacturer of model/toy steam engines, located in Jeannette, PA USA. Established in 1932 by Tom Jensen Sr. They are still making steam engines using traditional technology and methods.

== History ==
Tom Jensen Sr (1901–1992) was born and educated in Denmark and was interested in steam engines from an early age. In 1923 he made a large model steam engine which is still in working order and is now unofficially known as the Jensen #1. As a young man, he moved to the United States looking for work as an engineer. While waiting for a "proper" job to come along, he made a few samples of steam engines, hoping to sell them in a local department store. These were seen by a buyer from the F.A.O. Schwarz Toy Store in NY, who placed an order. The first batch of engines created much interest from other stores and catalogues and Jensen Steam Engines Inc. came into being in 1932.

The factory temporarily closed at the start of World War II but soon reopened to make equipment for the army. In 1992, George Bush wrote to Jensen, thanking him for his "...unique contribution to America".

On his death in 1992, Tom Jensen Sr. passed on the business to his son Tom Jr., who has continued the business until the present. Jensen Steam Engines is still a small family-owned business making steam engines using the same traditional technology as used by Tom Sr.

Of historical significance: The world's first nuclear power generated electricity was produced in September 1948 with the X-10 Graphite Reactor at Oak Ridge National Laboratory, Oak Ridge, Tennessee, where among other firsts, this first ever electricity generated by nuclear power occurred utilizing a Jensen #50 steam engine and generator. A miniature atomic power plant was operating and generating electricity on September 3, 1948 per records at ORNL.gov. The #50 was the largest model engine and generator made by Jensen Manufacturing Co of Jeannette, PA. That Jensen #50 and generator are still there in the Graphite Reactor building and still on the same shelf they were mounted on in 1948. That shelf with the engine is now part of a kiosk display in the visitor area in front of the loading face of the X-10 Graphite Reactor. While the power generated here was only about 3 volts, enough to light a flashlight bulb, it did occur in Oak Ridge in 1948 with a Jensen Steam Engine and generator. The makeshift boiling water reactor that these engineers built also became the test bed for the light water reactors used today.

== Models ==
The current range of models are divided into the Hobby/Educational series and the Collector/Commercial series; the latter being more substantial and "up-market". Some models are electrically heated and some are solid fuel fired; some on pressed steel bases and some on wooden bases.

=== Current range ===
==== Hobby ====
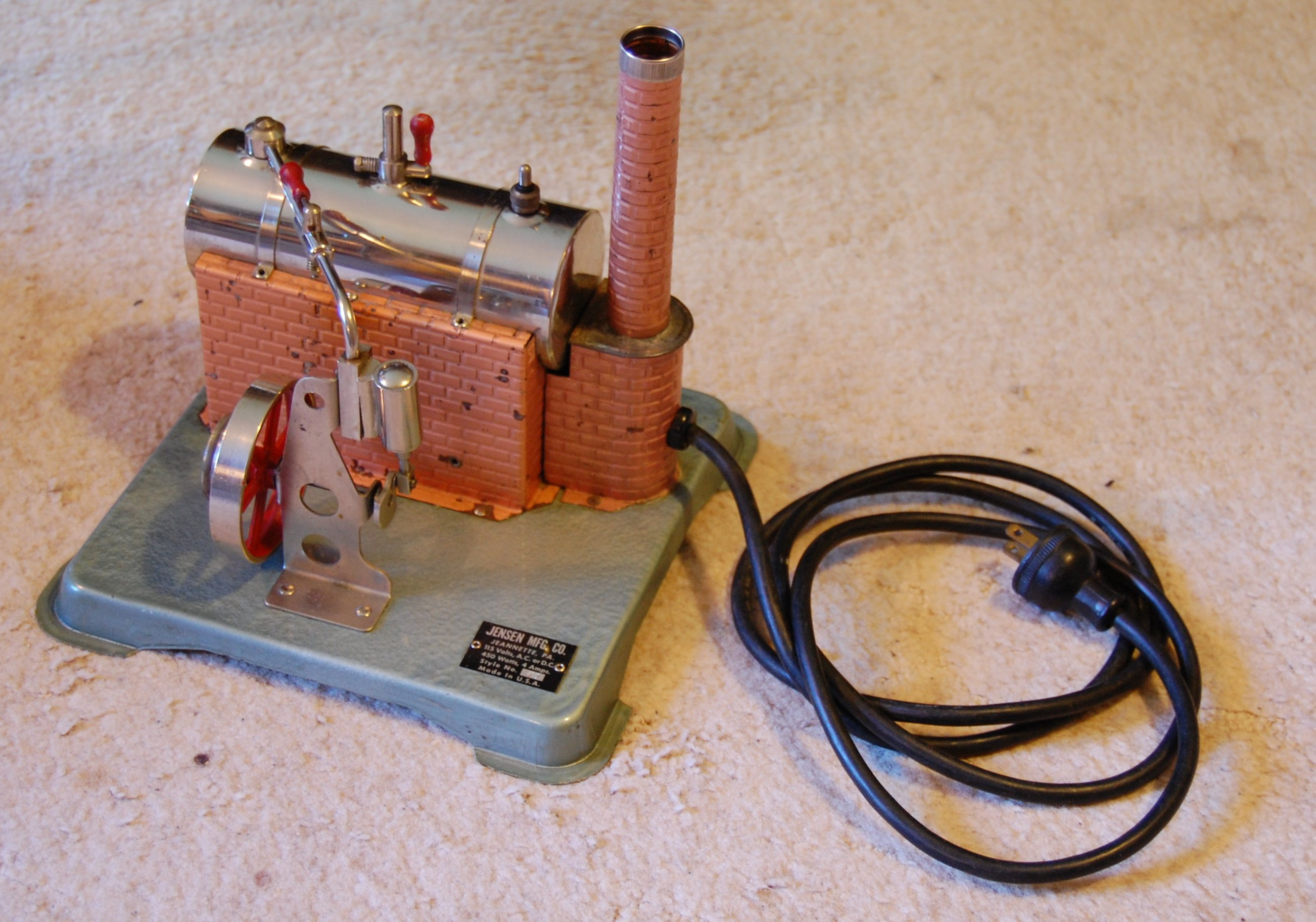
Jensen #70 electrically heated steam engine from the Hobby series

- #25
- #25G
- #60
- #65
- #70
- #70G
- #75
- #76
- #85

==== Collector ====
- #20
- #20G
- #55
- #55G
- #95G
- #50 returned to production 2015-2016

=== Discontinued models ===
- #5 1932-1960s
- #10 1932–1979
- #30 1954–1982
- #35 1934–1960
- #40 1960-1965
- #45 1949-1959
- #50 1930s-2011
- #51
- #78 1981?
- #80 1980s
- #90 1961 and 1988

=== One-offs and Specials ===
- #1 1923
- #20S 1984
- #51 1973-1996
- #55S 1984
- #85G 1996

=== Accessories ===
- #15 1935 current
- #15BL 2004
- #15D 1990
- #15E 2004
- #100 1948–1985

== See also ==
- Mamod
- Wilesco
