= Cyldon =

English brand of model steam engines

Cyldon (Sydney S Bird & Sons)
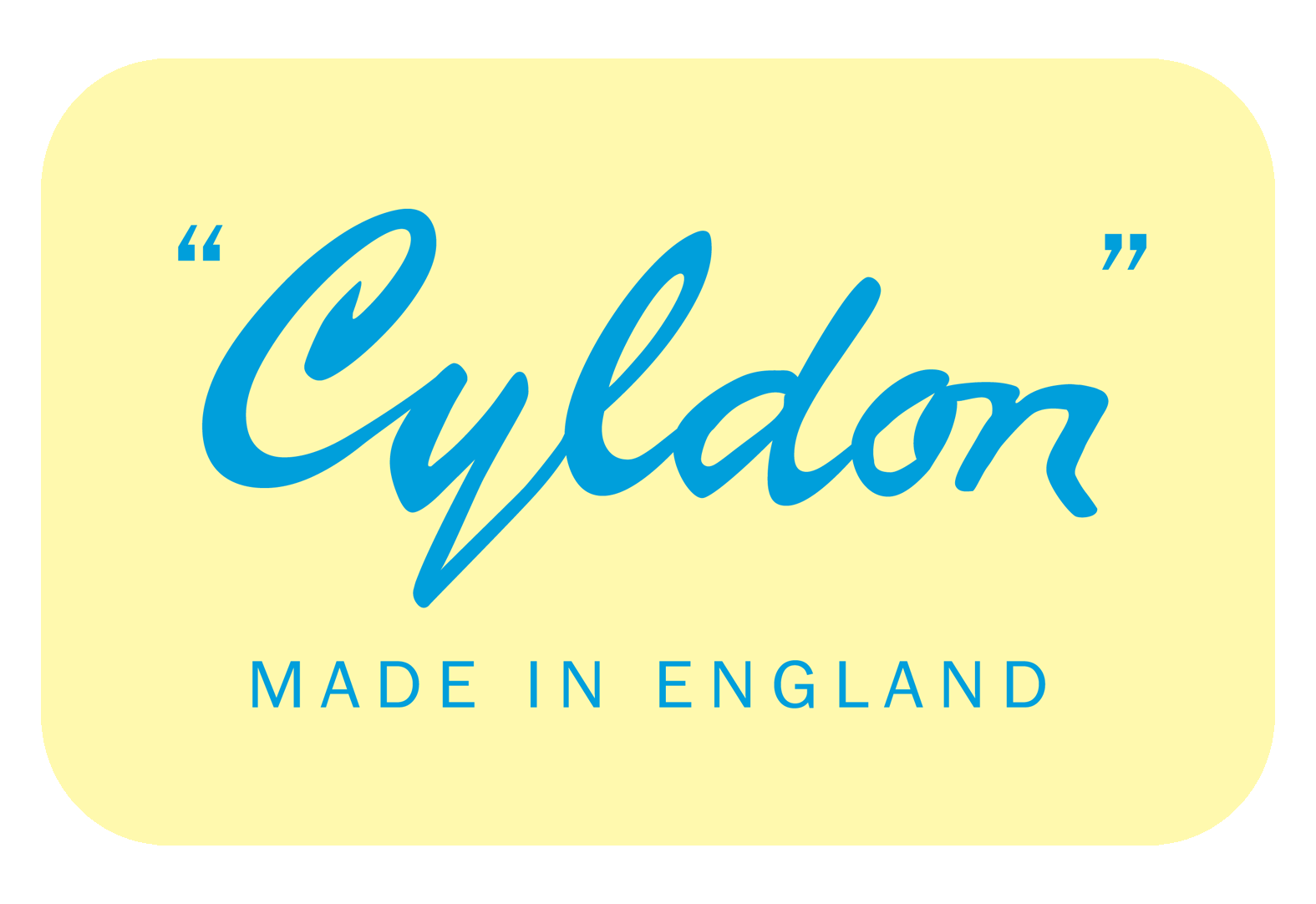
- Company type: Private
- Industry: Toys
- Founded: 1947
- Founder: Sydney S Bird
- Defunct: 1951
- Headquarters: Enfield, Middlesex, UK
- Area served: Worldwide
- Products: Toy steam engines

Cyldon was the brand name for a range of model stationary steam engines, manufactured in Enfield, Middlesex, England between 1947 and 1951 by Sydney S Bird & Sons. The name Cyldon was an amalgamation of Sydney Bird's two son's names Cyril and Donald.

The range extended to five different models, numbered 13/1 to 13/5. The designs were notable for their extensive use of non-ferrous metals, especially aluminium alloys, with very little steel used in most of the models.

All the engines were methylated spirit-fired with wick type burners, and all except the 13/3 were fitted with whistles.

Other Cyldon products included other toys, reels for magnetic tape and cine film, and variable capacitors.

== Models ==
=== 13/1 ===
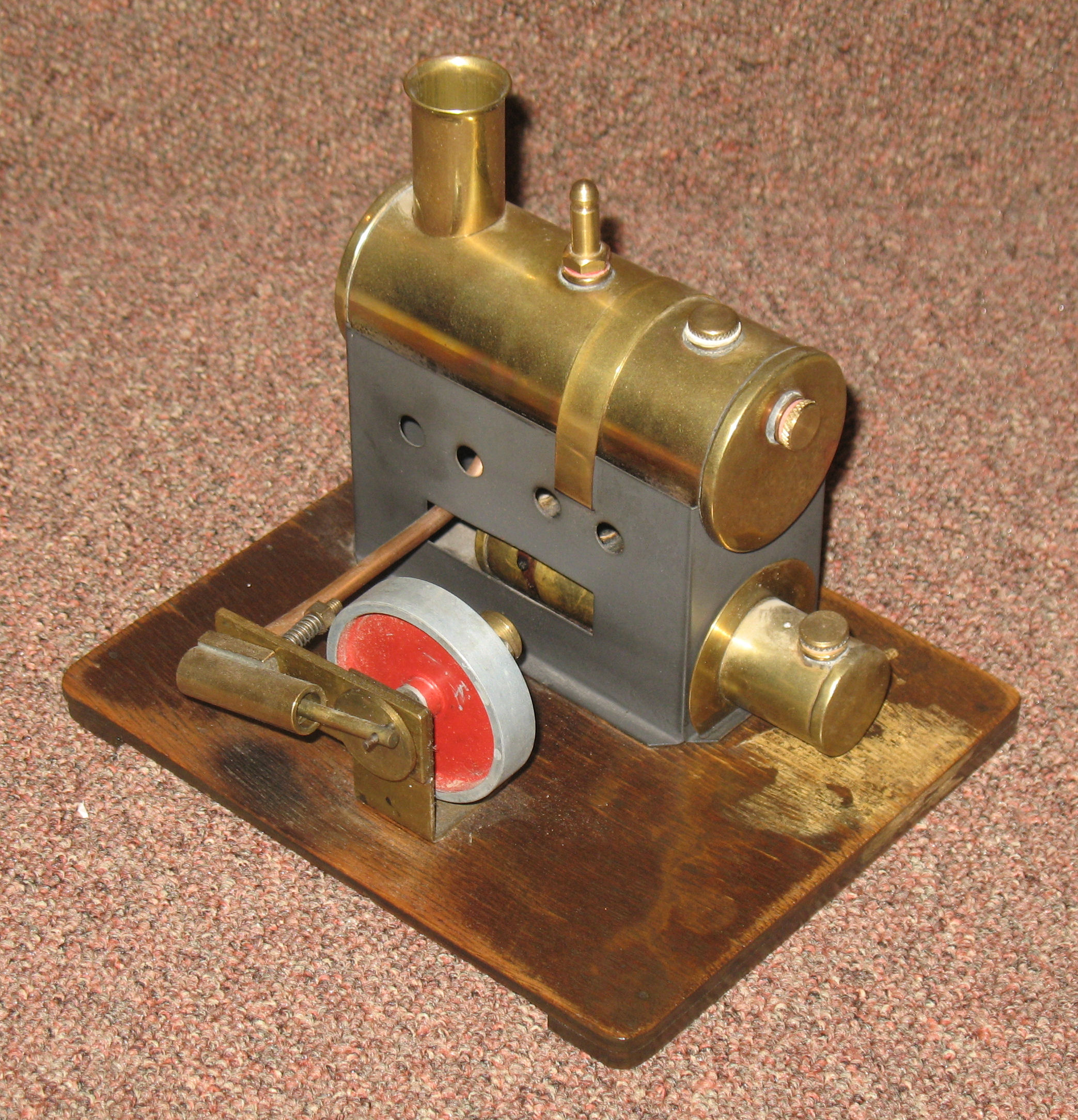
Cyldon 13-1 steam engine (whistle missing)

The 13/1 was (presumably) the first model made by Cyldon and is atypical in some details. The firebox is a different style from the usual Cyldon type and is steel instead of aluminium. The meths burner is also slightly different. The base is made of wood (as is the 13/2 but none of the other models).

The brass boiler is fired by a brass cylindrical three wick meths burner. It has a safety valve and a separate filler plug and overflow plug and is fitted with a whistle. It has a dummy chimney. The boiler is held onto the steel firebox with a single brass band. The copper steam pipe exits from the bottom of the boiler inside the firebox, thus getting a very small degree of superheat.

The steam is fed directly to the back of the port face of the oscillating cylinder. The brass cylinder is a single acting oscillating type. The crank shaft is steel, with a brass disk crank at one end, a small pulley at the other and mazak flywheel in the centre.

This model is vaguely similar in some respects to a one-off model identified as made by Mersey Model Co. Ltd. It has been suggested by some people that the Mersey model was used as a prototype for the Cyldon 13/1 and that there may be a link between the two companies. This is very unlikely and there is no known documentation to support this speculation.

A later version of the 13/1 had changes to the firebox and burner which were then adopted in the later models 13/2 - 13/4.

=== 13/2 ===
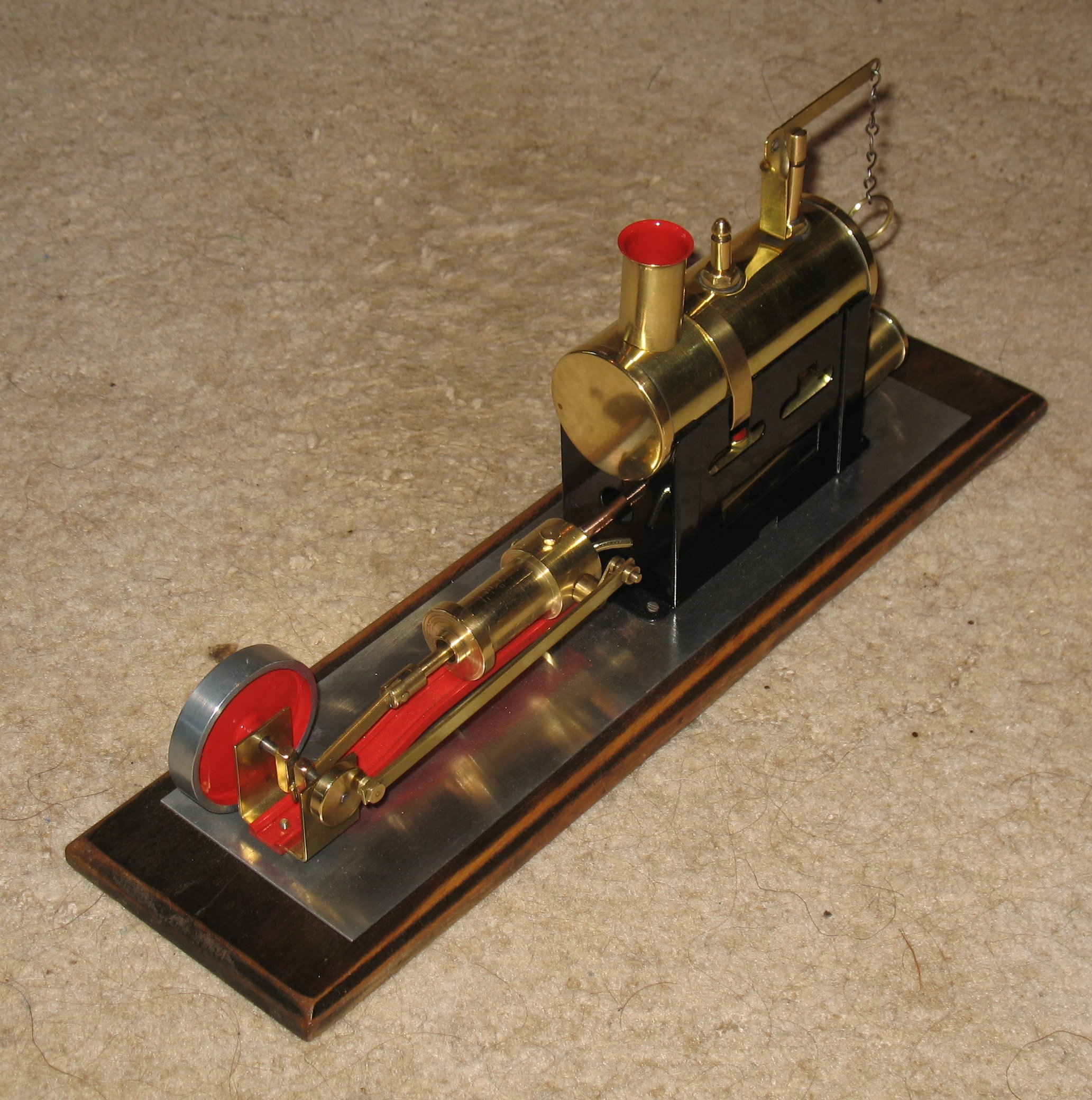
Cyldon 13/2 steam engine with semi-rotative valve gear

The 13/2 is interesting for a couple of reasons. Firstly, the overall layout, with the crankshaft, cylinder, boiler and burner all in line longitudinally, on a long thin wooden base. Secondly, and the most interesting aspect, is the semi-rotative valve gear (see below).

The meths burner has three short wick tubes set into a cylindrical fuel tank. In working position, half of the tank sits under the boiler and the other half protrudes outside.

Steam feed is taken from the bottom of the boiler and directly to the valve chest housing the semi-rotative valve. This consists of a brass rod, cross drilled with two holes at right angles to each other, a small distance apart. The outside end of the rod has a crank, linked to a crank on the engine crankshaft, so that it rocks back and forth by about 90 degrees. This causes the two holes to alternately line up with the steam and exhaust passages.

The cylinder is a substantial brass casting. It is single acting but the open end is small in comparison with the overall diameter, giving it the appearance of a double acting type. The cylinder is fixed (not oscillating) but it contains a long piston, as found in oscillating cylinders, so that it does not require a cross-head guide.

The end of the piston rod is connected to a built-up crank at the centre of the crankshaft. The crankshaft has the valve return crank at one end and a flywheel at the other.

=== 13/3 ===
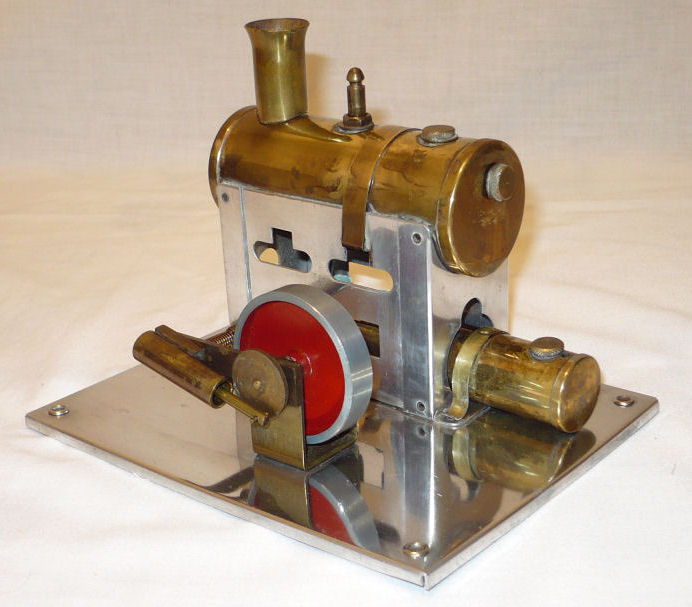
Cyldon 13/3 single-cylinder oscillating steam engine

The 13/3 is similar to the 13/1 but with mostly minor differences. The main difference being that it has a metal base instead of wood. Both are simple oscillating cylinder models - very conventional in style. Typical of Cyldon, all major parts are made from non-ferrous materials - brass, aluminium, copper and mazak; the only exceptions being small parts like screws, springs etc. The only painted part is the mazak flywheel.

The brass boiler is fired by a brass cylindrical three wick meths burner. It has a safety valve and a separate filler plug and overflow plug and a dummy chimney. Unlike the 13/1, it has no whistle. This is strange as all the other Cyldon models do have whistles. The copper steam pipe exits from the bottom of the boiler inside the firebox, thus getting a very small degree of superheat.

The steam is fed directly to the back of the port face of the brass single acting oscillating cylinder. The crank shaft is one of the few steel parts, with a brass disk crank at one end, a small pulley at the other and mazak flywheel in the centre. The simple brass engine bracket is fixed to the aluminium base plate; which has a rubber foot at each corner.

=== 13/4 ===
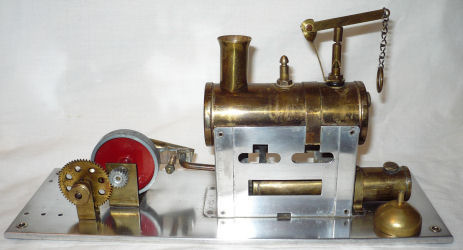
Cyldon 13/4 single-cylinder oscillating steam engine

The 13/4 is very typical of Cyldon, having similarities with most of the other models. It has the same main components as the 13/3 but laid out in an in-line configuration like the 13/2. It has a geared output like the 13/5.

The brass boiler is fired by a brass cylindrical three-wick meths burner. It has a whistle, a safety valve, overflow plug and dummy chimney. The boiler is held onto the aluminium firebox with the single brass band typical of Cyldon practice. The copper steam pipe exits from the bottom of the boiler inside the firebox, but does not pass through the flame, so gets no superheat.

The steam is fed directly to the back of the port face of the oscillating cylinder. The brass cylinder is a single acting oscillating cylinder type. The crank shaft is one of the few steel parts, with a brass disk crank at one end, and mazak flywheel in the centre. (The flywheel is the only painted part of the whole engine). At the other end of the crankshaft is a small pinion meshing with a larger gear wheel mounted on a short shaft in its own bracket, giving a 3:1 speed reduction. The second shaft has a small pulley attached. The simple brass brackets are fixed to the long thin aluminium base plate, which has a rubber foot at each corner.

=== 13/5 ===
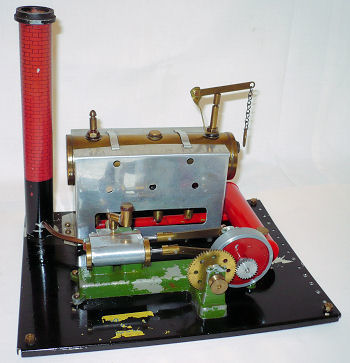
Cyldon 13/5 fixed-cylinder steam engine

The 13/5 is relatively conventional by Cyldon standards. The overall layout is typical of many stationary steam toys. It is unusual in the extensive use of aluminium alloys. The base, engine frame, valve block, flywheel, firebox and chimney are all mazac or aluminium alloy; most of the rest of the engine is brass. There is very little steel used, only the crank shaft, piston / valve rods and a few other minor items.

The burner is an unusual four wick design, fixed to the base with the cylindrical tank outside of the firebox, at right angles to the wick holders inside. Lighting the wicks has to be done through a slot in the firebox. Adjusting or replacing the wicks requires detaching the burner from the base. The boiler is a pretty standard design, slightly larger than the other models.

Steam feed is taken from the bottom of the boiler, through the burner flame for superheating, and out to a compression fitting on the valve chest. The slide valve is controlled by a fixed crank on the crankshaft. The engine is not reversible.

The cylinder is a mazac casting with brass end caps, mounted on a substantial mazac frame. It is double acting. Exhaust is piped to the bottom of a chimney, which is mounted on the base.

The end of the piston rod is connected to a built-up crank at the centre of the crankshaft. The crankshaft has the valve return crank at one end and a flywheel at the other. Also at the flywheel end is a small pinion meshing with a larger gear wheel mounted on a bracket cast in with the engine frame, giving a slightly more than 2:1 speed reduction. The second shaft has a small pulley attached.
