= X-10 Graphite Reactor =

Decommissioned nuclear reactor in Tennessee, US

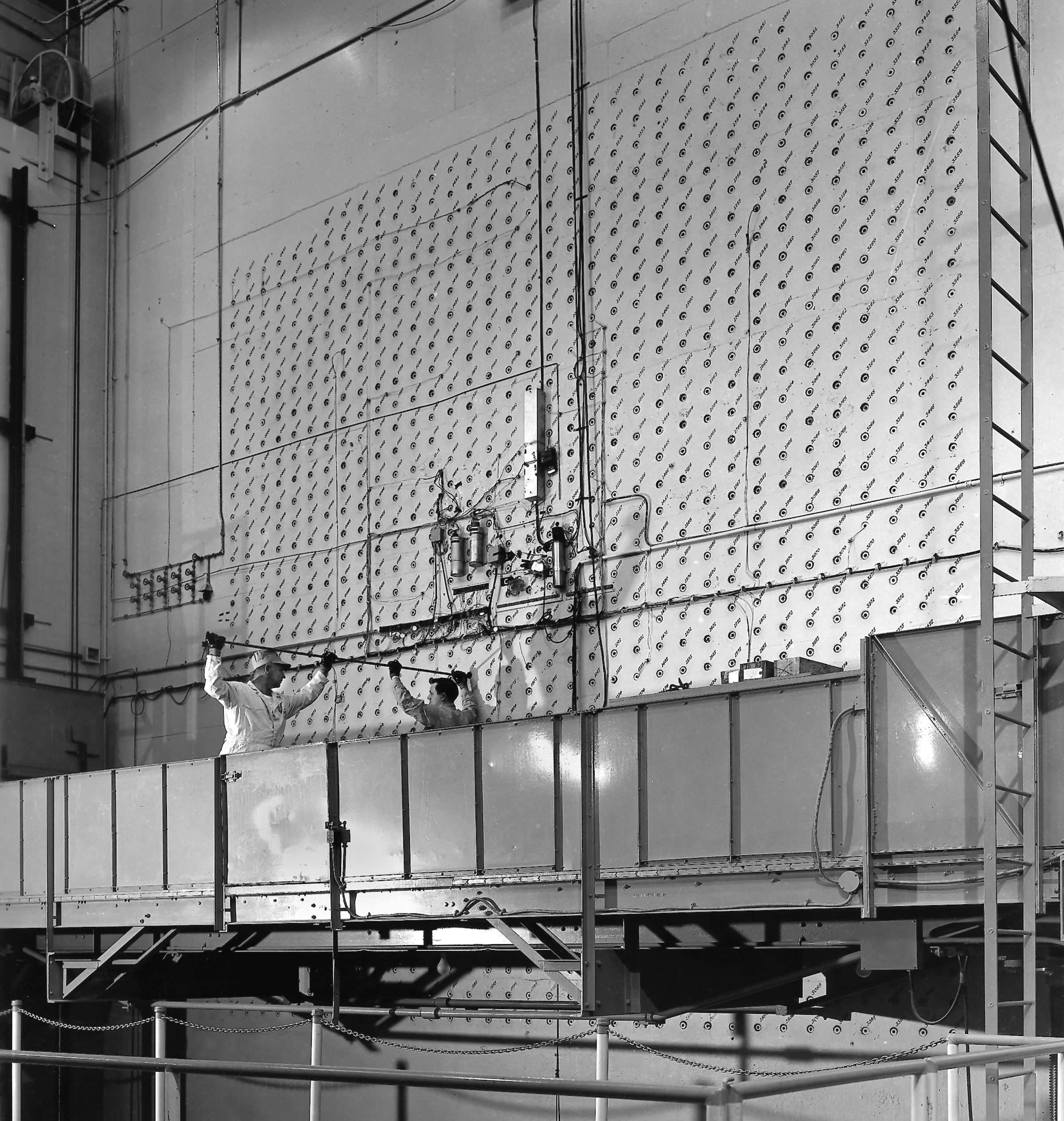
- Workers in the Graphite Reactor use a rod to push fresh uranium slugs into the reactor's concrete loading face.
- Reactor concept: Research reactor (uranium/graphite)
- Designed and built by: Metallurgical Laboratory
- Operational: 1943 to 1963
- Status: Decommissioned

Main parameters of the reactor core
- Fuel (fissile material): Metallic natural uranium
- Fuel state: Solid (pellets)
- Neutron energy spectrum: slow
- Primary control method: Control rods
- Primary moderator: Nuclear graphite (bricks)
- Primary coolant: Air

Reactor usage
- Primary use: Research
- Remarks: The world's second artificial nuclear reactor.
- X-10 Graphite Reactor
- U.S. National Register of Historic Places
- U.S. National Historic Landmark
- Interactive map highlighting the location of the X-10 Reactor
- Location: Oak Ridge National Laboratory
- Nearest city: Oak Ridge, Tennessee
- Coordinates: 35°55′41″N 84°19′03″W
- Area: less than 1 acre (0.40 ha)
- Built: 1943
- NRHP reference No.: 66000720

Significant dates
- Added to NRHP: October 15, 1966
- Designated NHL: December 21, 1965

The X-10 Graphite Reactor is a decommissioned nuclear reactor at Oak Ridge National Laboratory in Oak Ridge, Tennessee. Formerly known as the Clinton Pile and X-10 Pile, it was the world's second artificial nuclear reactor (after Enrico Fermi's Chicago Pile-1) and the first intended for continuous operation. It was built during World War II as part of the Manhattan Project.

While Chicago Pile-1 demonstrated the feasibility of nuclear reactors, the Manhattan Project's goal of producing enough plutonium for atomic bombs required reactors a thousand times as powerful, along with facilities to chemically separate the plutonium bred in the reactors from uranium and fission products. An intermediate step was considered prudent. The next step for the plutonium project, codenamed X-10, was the construction of a semiworks where techniques and procedures could be developed and training conducted. The centerpiece of this was the X-10 Graphite Reactor. It was air-cooled, used nuclear graphite as a neutron moderator, and pure natural uranium in metal form for fuel.

Using designs by the Metallurgical Laboratory, DuPont commenced construction of the plutonium semiworks at the Clinton Engineer Works in Oak Ridge on February 2, 1943. The reactor went critical on November 4, 1943, and produced its first plutonium in early 1944. The reactor and chemical separation plant provided invaluable experience for engineers, technicians, reactor operators, and safety officials who then moved on to the Hanford Site. It supplied the Los Alamos Laboratory with its first significant amounts of plutonium and its first reactor-bred product. Studies of these samples in comparison to those from cyclotrons revealed a higher content of plutonium-240, making the gun-type Thin Man design impossible, leading to the Gadget and Fat Man bombs of the now-ubiquitous implosion-type.

X-10 operated as a plutonium production plant until January 1945, when it was turned over to research activities and the production of radioactive isotopes for scientific, medical, industrial and agricultural uses. In August 1948, it became the first nuclear reactor to produce electricity, lighting a single bulb. It was shut down in 1963 and was designated a National Historic Landmark in 1965.

== Origins ==
The discovery of nuclear fission by German chemists Otto Hahn and Fritz Strassmann in 1938, followed by its theoretical explanation (and naming) by Lise Meitner and Otto Frisch, opened up the possibility of a controlled nuclear chain reaction with uranium. At Columbia University, Enrico Fermi and Leo Szilard began exploring how this might be done. Szilard drafted a confidential letter to the President of the United States, Franklin D. Roosevelt, explaining the possibility of atomic bombs, and warning of the danger of a German nuclear weapon project. He convinced his old friend and collaborator Albert Einstein to co-sign it, lending his fame to the proposal. This resulted in support by the U.S. government for research into nuclear fission, which became the Manhattan Project.

In April 1941, the National Defense Research Committee asked Arthur Compton, a Nobel-Prize-winning physics professor at the University of Chicago, to report on the uranium program. His report, submitted in May 1941, foresaw the prospects of developing radiological weapons, nuclear propulsion for ships, and nuclear weapons using uranium-235 or the recently discovered plutonium. In October he wrote another report on the practicality of an atomic bomb. Niels Bohr and John Wheeler had theorized that heavy isotopes with even atomic numbers and odd number of neutrons were fissile. If so, then plutonium-239 was likely to be fissile.

Emilio Segrè and Glenn Seaborg at the University of California produced 28 μg of plutonium in the 60-inch cyclotron there in May 1941 and found that it had 1.7 times the thermal neutron capture cross section of uranium-235. At the time plutonium-239 had been produced in minute quantities using cyclotrons, but it was not possible to produce large quantities that way. Compton discussed with Eugene Wigner from Princeton University how plutonium might be produced in a nuclear reactor, and with Robert Serber how the plutonium produced in a reactor might be separated from uranium.

The final draft of Compton's November 1941 report made no mention of using plutonium, but after discussing the latest research with Ernest Lawrence, Compton became convinced that a plutonium bomb was also feasible. In December, Compton was placed in charge of the plutonium project, which was codenamed X-10. Its objectives were to produce reactors to convert uranium to plutonium, to find ways to chemically separate the plutonium from the uranium, and to design and build an atomic bomb. It fell to Compton to decide which of the different types of reactor designs the scientists should pursue, even though a successful reactor had not yet been built. He felt that having teams at Columbia, Princeton, the University of Chicago and the University of California was creating too much duplication and not enough collaboration, and he concentrated the work at the Metallurgical Laboratory at the University of Chicago.

== Site selection ==
By June 1942, the Manhattan Project had reached the stage where the construction of production facilities could be contemplated. On June 25, 1942, the Office of Scientific Research and Development S-1 Executive Committee deliberated on where they should be located. Moving directly to a megawatt production plant looked like a big step, given that many industrial processes do not easily scale from the laboratory to production size. An intermediate step of building a pilot plant was considered prudent. For the pilot plutonium separation plant, a site was wanted close to the Metallurgical Laboratory, where the research was being carried out, but for reasons of safety and security, it was not desirable to locate the facilities in a densely populated area like Chicago.

Compton selected a site in the Argonne Forest, part of the Forest Preserve District of Cook County, about 20 miles (32 km) southwest of Chicago. The full-scale production facilities would be co-located with other Manhattan Project facilities at a still more remote location in Tennessee. Some 1,000 acres (400 ha) of land was leased from Cook County for the pilot facilities, while an 83,000-acre (34,000 ha) site for the production facilities was selected at Oak Ridge, Tennessee. By the S-1 Executive Committee meeting on September 13 and 14, it had become apparent that the pilot facilities would be too extensive for the Argonne site, so instead a research reactor would be built at Argonne, while the plutonium pilot facilities (a semiworks) would be built at the Clinton Engineer Works in Tennessee.

The Oak Ridge site was selected on the basis of several criteria. The plutonium pilot facilities needed to be two to four miles (3.2 to 6.4 km) from the site boundary and any other installation, in case radioactive fission products escaped. While security and safety concerns suggested a remote site, it still needed to be near sources of labor, and accessible by road and rail transportation. A mild climate that allowed construction to proceed throughout the year was desirable. Terrain separated by ridges would reduce the impact of accidental explosions, but they could not be so steep as to complicate construction. The substratum needed to be firm enough to provide good foundations but not so rocky that it would hinder excavation work. It needed large amounts of electrical power (available from the Tennessee Valley Authority) and cooling water. Finally, a War Department policy held that, as a rule, munitions facilities should not be located west of the Sierra or Cascade Ranges, east of the Appalachian Mountains, or within 200 miles (320 km) of the Canadian or Mexican borders.

In December, it was decided that the plutonium production facilities would not be built at Oak Ridge after all, but at the even more remote Hanford Site in Washington state. Compton and the staff at the Metallurgical Laboratory then reopened the question of building the plutonium semiworks at Argonne, but the engineers and management of DuPont, particularly Roger Williams (the head of its TNX Division, which was responsible for the company's role in the Manhattan Project), did not support this proposal. They felt that there would be insufficient space at Argonne and that there were disadvantages in having a site that was so accessible, as they were afraid that it would permit the research staff from the Metallurgical Laboratory to interfere unduly with the design and construction, which they considered their prerogative. A better location, they felt, would be with the remote production facilities at Hanford. In the end a compromise was reached. On January 12, 1943, Compton, Williams, and Brigadier General Leslie R. Groves, Jr., the director of the Manhattan Project, agreed that the semiworks would be built at the Clinton Engineer Works.

Both Compton and Groves proposed that DuPont operate the semiworks. Williams counter-proposed that the semiworks be operated by the Metallurgical Laboratory. He reasoned that it would primarily be a research and educational facility, and that expertise was to be found at the Metallurgical Laboratory. Compton was shocked; the Metallurgical Laboratory was part of the University of Chicago, and therefore the university would be operating an industrial facility 500 miles (800 km) from its main campus. James B. Conant told him that Harvard University "wouldn't touch it with a ten-foot pole", but the University of Chicago's Vice President, Emery T. Filbey, took a different view and instructed Compton to accept. When University President Robert Hutchins returned, he greeted Compton with "I see, Arthur, that while I was gone you doubled the size of my university".

== Design ==
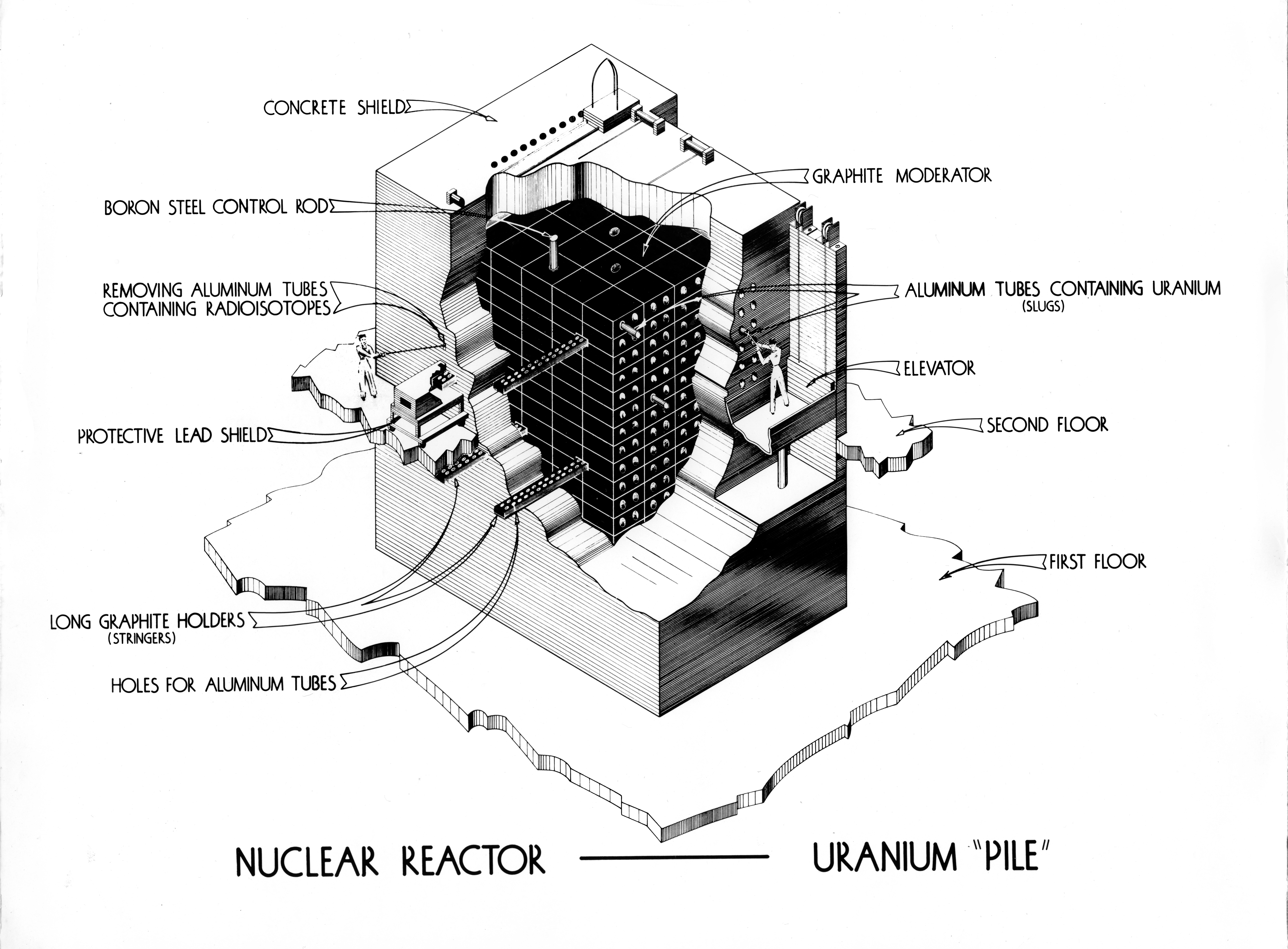
Diagram of the reactor

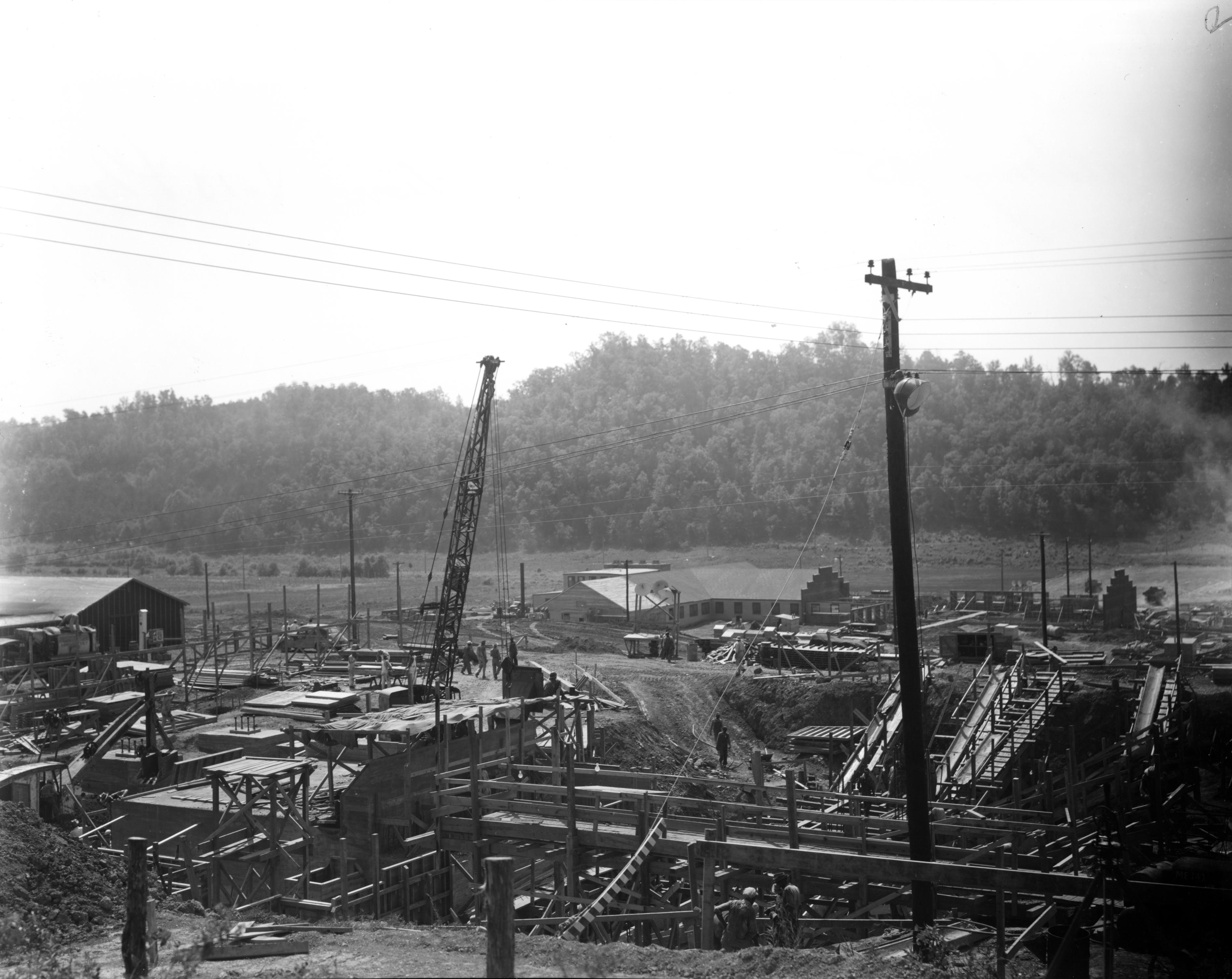
Under construction

The fundamental design decisions in building a reactor are the choice of fuel, coolant and neutron moderator. The choice of fuel was straightforward; only natural uranium was available. The decision that the reactor would use graphite as a neutron moderator caused little debate. Although with heavy water as moderator the number of neutrons produced for every one absorbed (known as k factor) was 10 percent more than in the purest graphite, heavy water would be unavailable in sufficient quantities for at least a year. This left the choice of coolant, over which there was much discussion. A limiting factor was that the fuel slugs would be clad in aluminum, so the operating temperature of the reactor could not exceed 200 °C (392 °F). The theoretical physicists in Wigner's group at the Metallurgical Laboratory developed several designs. In November 1942, the DuPont engineers chose helium gas as the coolant for the production plant, mainly on the basis that it did not absorb neutrons but also because it was inert, which removed the issue of corrosion.

Not everyone agreed with the decision to use helium. Szilard, in particular, was an early proponent of using liquid bismuth; but the major opponent was Wigner, who argued forcefully in favor of a water-cooled reactor design. He realized that since water absorbed neutrons, k would be reduced by about 3 percent, but he had sufficient confidence in his calculations that the water-cooled reactor would still be able to achieve criticality. From an engineering perspective, a water-cooled design was straightforward to design and build, while helium posed technological problems. Wigner's team produced a preliminary report on water cooling, designated CE-140 in April 1942, followed by a more detailed one, CE-197, titled "On a Plant with Water Cooling", in July 1942.

Fermi's Chicago Pile-1 reactor, constructed under the west viewing stands of the original Stagg Field at the University of Chicago, "went critical" on December 2, 1942. This graphite-moderated reactor only generated up to 200 W, but it demonstrated that k was higher than anticipated. This removed most of the objections to air-cooled and water-cooled reactor designs, and it greatly simplified other aspects of the design. Wigner's team submitted blueprints of a water-cooled reactor to DuPont in January 1943. By this time, the concerns of DuPont's engineers about the corrosiveness of water had been overcome by the mounting difficulties of using helium, and all work on helium was terminated in February. At the same time, air cooling was chosen for the reactor at the pilot plant. Since it would be of a quite different design from the production reactors, the X-10 Graphite Reactor lost its value as a prototype, but its value as a working pilot facility remained, providing plutonium needed for research. It was hoped that problems would be found in time to deal with them in the production plants. The semiworks would also be used for training and for developing procedures.

== Construction ==
Although the design of the reactor was not yet complete, DuPont began construction of the plutonium semiworks on February 2, 1943, on an isolated 112-acre (45.3 ha) site in Bethel Valley about 10 miles (16 km) southwest of Oak Ridge, officially known as the X-10 area. The site included research laboratories, a chemical separation plant, a waste storage area, a training facility for Hanford staff, and administrative and support facilities that included a laundry, cafeteria, first aid center, and fire station. Because of the subsequent decision to construct water-cooled reactors at Hanford, only the chemical separation plant operated as a true pilot. The semiworks eventually became known as the Clinton Laboratories and was operated by the University of Chicago as part of the Metallurgical Project.

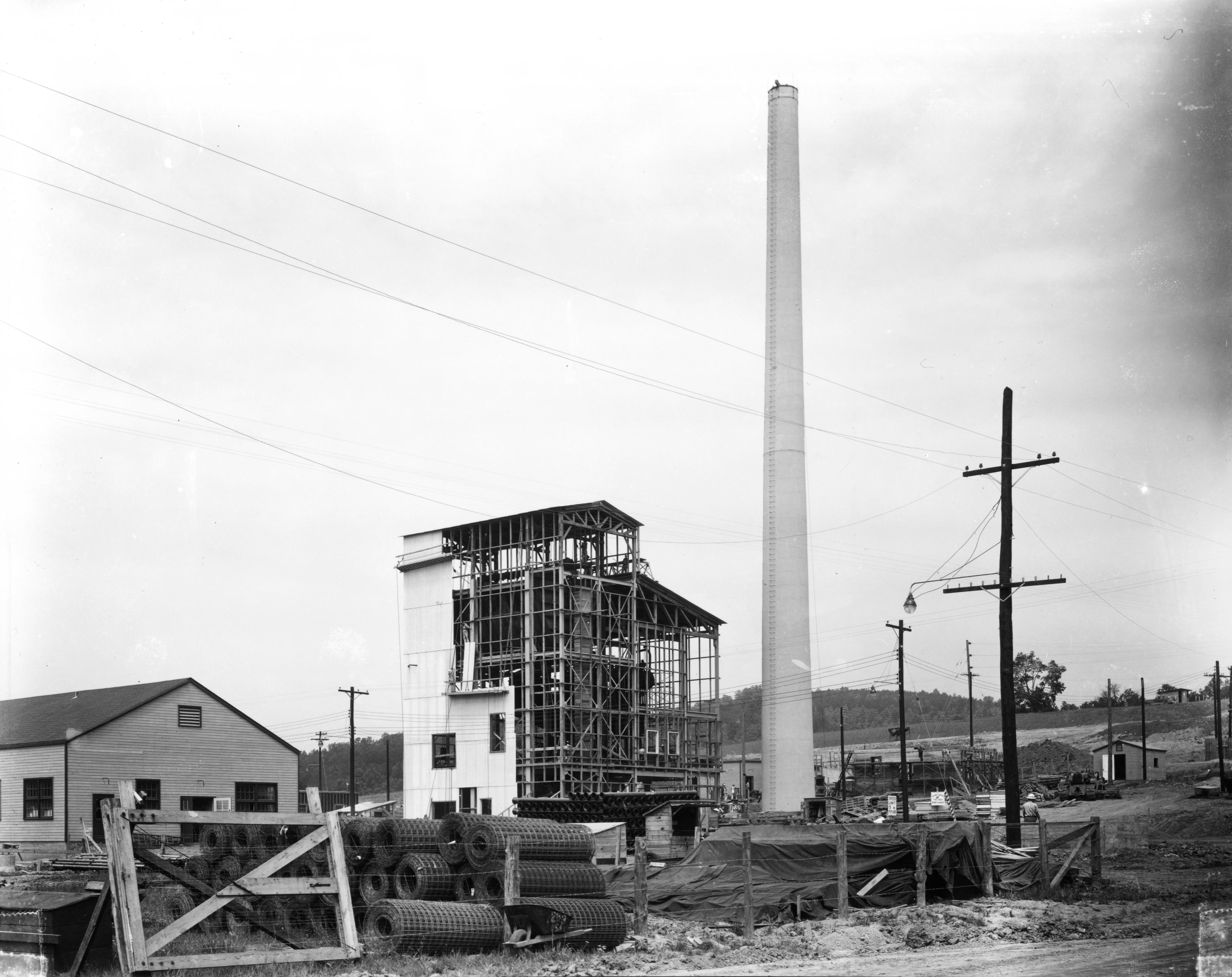
X-10 under construction

Construction work on the reactor had to wait until DuPont had completed the design. Excavation commenced on April 27, 1943. A large pocket of soft clay was soon discovered, necessitating additional foundations. Further delays occurred due to wartime difficulties in procuring building materials. There was an acute shortage of both common and skilled labor; the contractor had only three-quarters of the required workforce, and there was high turnover and absenteeism, mainly the result of poor accommodations and difficulties in commuting. The township of Oak Ridge was still under construction, and barracks were built to house workers. Special arrangements with individual workers increased their morale and reduced turnover. Furthermore, there was unusually heavy rainfall, with 9.3 inches (240 mm) falling in July 1943, more than twice the average of 4.3 inches (110 mm).

Some 700 short tons (640 t) of graphite blocks were purchased from National Carbon. The construction crews began stacking them in September 1943. Cast uranium billets came from Metal Hydrides, Mallinckrodt and other suppliers. These were extruded into cylindrical slugs and then canned. The fuel slugs were canned to protect the uranium metal from corrosion that would occur if it came into contact with water and to prevent the venting of gaseous radioactive fission products that might be formed when they were irradiated. Aluminum was chosen because it transmitted heat well but did not absorb too many neutrons. Alcoa started canning on June 14, 1943. General Electric and the Metallurgical Laboratory developed a new welding technique to seal the cans airtight, and the equipment for this was installed in the production line at Alcoa in October 1943.

Construction commenced on the pilot separation plant before a chemical process for separating plutonium from uranium had been selected. Not until May 1943 would DuPont managers decide to use the bismuth phosphate process in preference to one using lanthanum fluoride. The bismuth phosphate process was devised by Stanley G. Thompson at the University of California. Plutonium had two oxidation states; a tetravalent (+4) state, and hexavalent (+6) state, with different chemical properties. Bismuth phosphate (BiPO_{4}) was similar in its crystalline structure to plutonium phosphate, and plutonium would be carried with bismuth phosphate in a solution while other elements, including uranium, would be precipitated. The plutonium could then be precipitated from the solution by changing its oxidation state. The plant consisted of six cells, separated from each other and the control room by thick concrete walls. The equipment was operated from the control room by remote control due to the radioactivity produced by fission products. Work was completed on November 26, 1943, but the plant could not operate until the reactor started producing irradiated uranium slugs.

== Operation ==
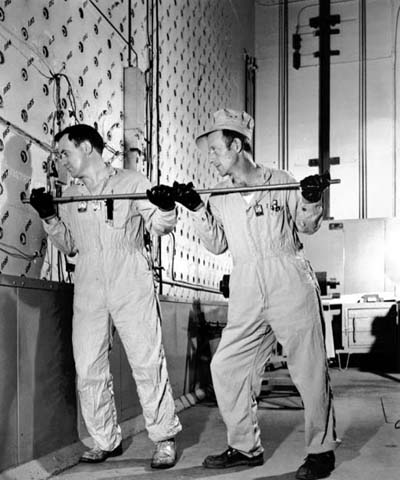
Loading fuel slugs

The X-10 Graphite Reactor was the world's second artificial nuclear reactor after Chicago Pile-1 and was the first reactor designed and built for continuous operation. It consisted of a huge block, 24 feet (7.3 m) long on each side, of nuclear graphite cubes, weighing around 1,500 short tons (1,400 t), that acted as a moderator. They were surrounded by seven feet (2.1 m) of high-density concrete as a radiation shield. In all, the reactor was 38 feet (12 m) wide, 47 feet (14 m) deep and 32 feet (9.8 m) high. There were 36 horizontal rows of 35 holes. Behind each was a metal channel into which uranium fuel slugs could be inserted. An elevator provided access to those higher up. Only 800 (~64%) of the channels were ever used.

The reactor used cadmium-clad steel control rods. Made from neutron-absorbing cadmium, these could restrict or halt the reaction. Three 8-foot (2.4 m) rods penetrated the reactor vertically, held in place by a clutch to form the scram system. They were suspended from steel cables that were wound around a drum and held in place by an electromagnetic clutch. If power was lost, they would drop into the reactor, halting it. The other four rods were made of boron steel and horizontally penetrated the reactor from the north side. Two of them, known as "shim" rods, were hydraulically controlled. Sand-filled hydraulic accumulators could be used in the event of a power failure. The other two rods were driven by electric motors.

The cooling system consisted of three electric fans running at 55,000 cubic feet per minute (1,600 m^{3}/min). Because it was cooled using outside air, the reactor could be run at a higher power level on cold days. After going through the reactor, the air was filtered to remove radioactive particles larger than 0.00004 inches (0.0010 mm) in diameter. This took care of over 99 percent of the radioactive particles. It was then vented through a 200-foot (61 m) chimney. The reactor was operated from a control room in the southeast corner on the second floor.

In September 1942, Compton asked physicist Martin D. Whitaker to form a skeleton operating staff for X-10. Whitaker became the inaugural director of the Clinton Laboratories, as the semiworks became officially known in April 1943. The first permanent operating staff arrived from the Metallurgical Laboratory in Chicago in April 1943, by which time DuPont began transferring its technicians to the site. They were augmented by 100 technicians in uniform from the Army's Special Engineer Detachment. By March 1944, there were some 1,500 people working at X-10.

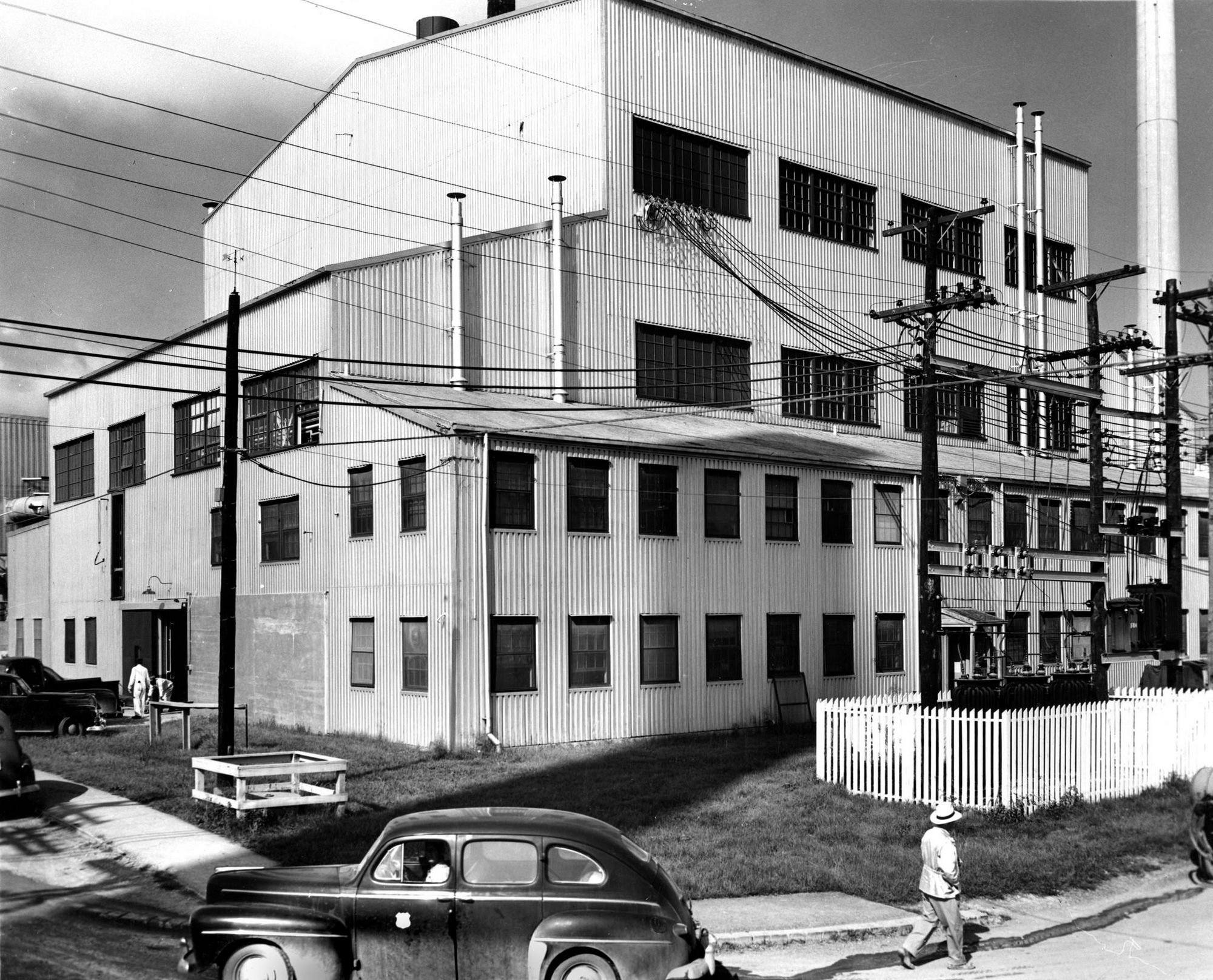
Exterior of the Graphite Reactor at the X-10 site in Oak Ridge in 1950

Supervised by Compton, Whitaker, and Fermi, the reactor went critical on November 4, 1943, with about 30 short tons (27 t) of uranium. A week later the load was increased to 36 short tons (33 t), raising its power generation to 500 kW, and by the end of the month the first 500 mg of plutonium was created. The reactor normally operated around the clock, with 10-hour weekly shutdowns for refueling. During startup, the safety rods and one shim rod were completely removed. The other shim rod was inserted at a predetermined position. When the desired power level was reached, the reactor was controlled by adjusting the partly inserted shim rod.

The first batch of canned slugs to be irradiated was received on December 20, 1943, allowing the first plutonium to be produced in early 1944. The slugs used pure metallic natural uranium, in air-tight aluminum cans 4.1 inches (100 mm) long and 1 inch (25 mm) in diameter. Each channel was loaded with between 24 and 54 fuel slugs. In its later life the reactor was operated with as much as 54 short tons (49 t). To load a channel, the radiation-absorbing shield plug was removed, and the slugs inserted manually in the front (east) end with long rods. To unload them, they were pushed all the way through to the far (west) end, where they fell onto a neoprene slab and fell down a chute into a 20-foot-deep (6.1 m) pool of water that acted as a radiation shield. Following weeks of underwater storage to allow for decay in radioactivity, the slugs were delivered to the chemical separation building.

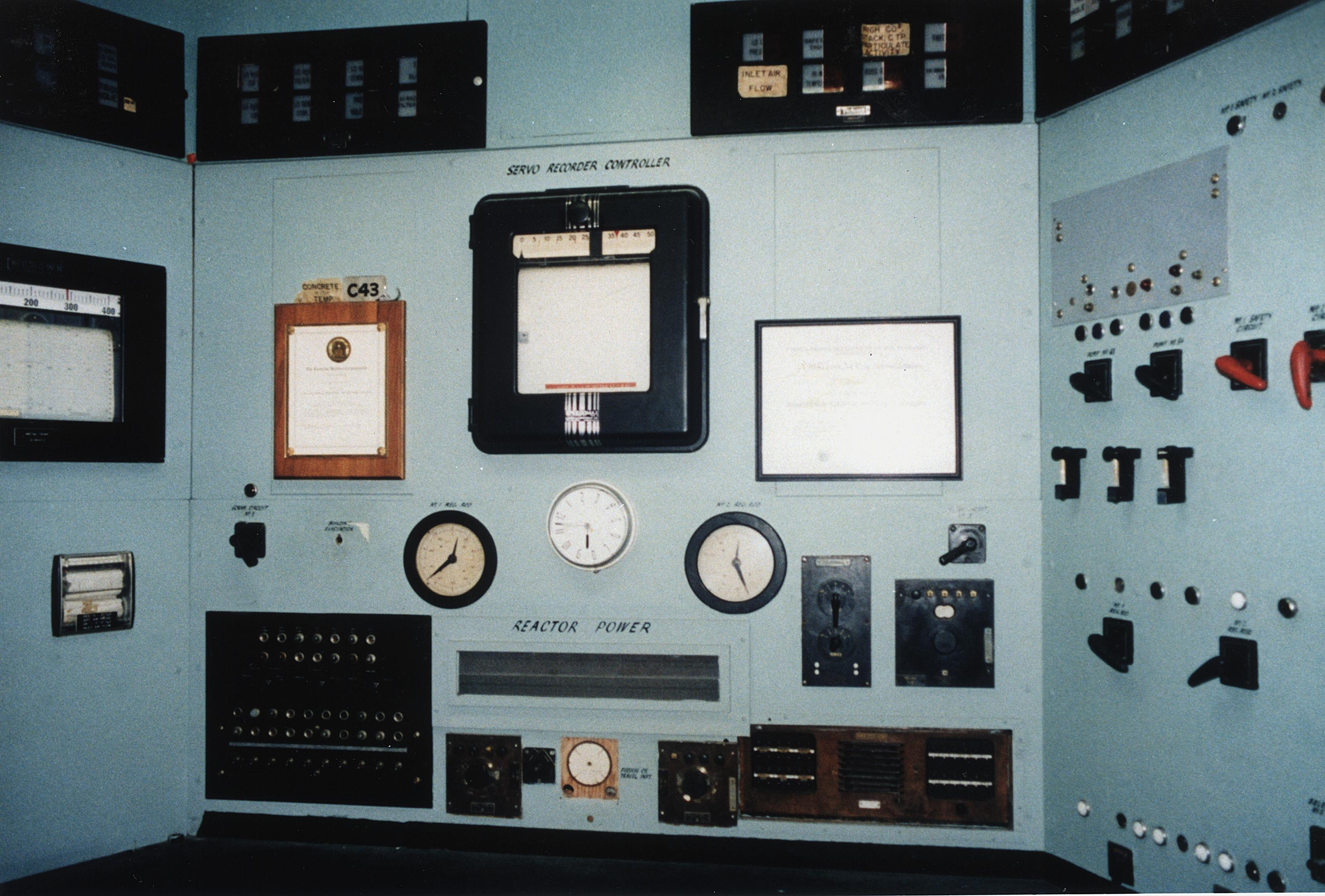
Reactor controls

By February 1944, the reactor was irradiating a ton of uranium every three days. Over the next five months, the efficiency of the separation process was improved, with the percentage of plutonium recovered increasing from 40 to 90 percent. Modifications over time raised the reactor's power to 4,000 kW in July 1944. The effect of the neutron poison xenon-135, one of many fission products produced from the uranium fuel, was not detected during the early operation of the X-10 Graphite Reactor. Xenon-135 subsequently caused problems with the startup of the Hanford B Reactor that nearly halted the plutonium project.

The X-10 semiworks operated as a plutonium production plant until January 1945, when it was turned over to research activities. By this time, 299 batches of irradiated slugs had been processed. A radioisotope building, a steam plant, and other structures were added in April 1946 to support the laboratory's peacetime educational and research missions. All work was completed by December 1946, adding another $1,009,000 (equivalent to $12.3 million in 2024) to the cost of construction at X-10, and bringing the total cost to $13,041,000 (equivalent to $159 million in 2024). Operational costs added another $22,250,000 (equivalent to $272 million in 2024).

X-10 supplied the Los Alamos Laboratory with the first significant samples of plutonium. Studies of these by Emilio G. Segrè and his P-5 Group at Los Alamos revealed that it contained impurities in the form of the isotope plutonium-240, which has a far higher spontaneous fission rate than plutonium-239. This meant that it would be highly likely that a plutonium gun-type nuclear weapon would predetonate and blow itself apart during the initial formation of a critical mass. The Los Alamos Laboratory was thus forced to turn its development efforts to creating an implosion-type nuclear weapon—a far more difficult feat.

The X-10 chemical separation plant also verified the bismuth-phosphate process that was used in the full-scale separation facilities at Hanford. The reactor and chemical separation plant provided invaluable experience for engineers, technicians, reactor operators, and safety officials who then moved on to the Hanford Site.

== Peacetime use ==
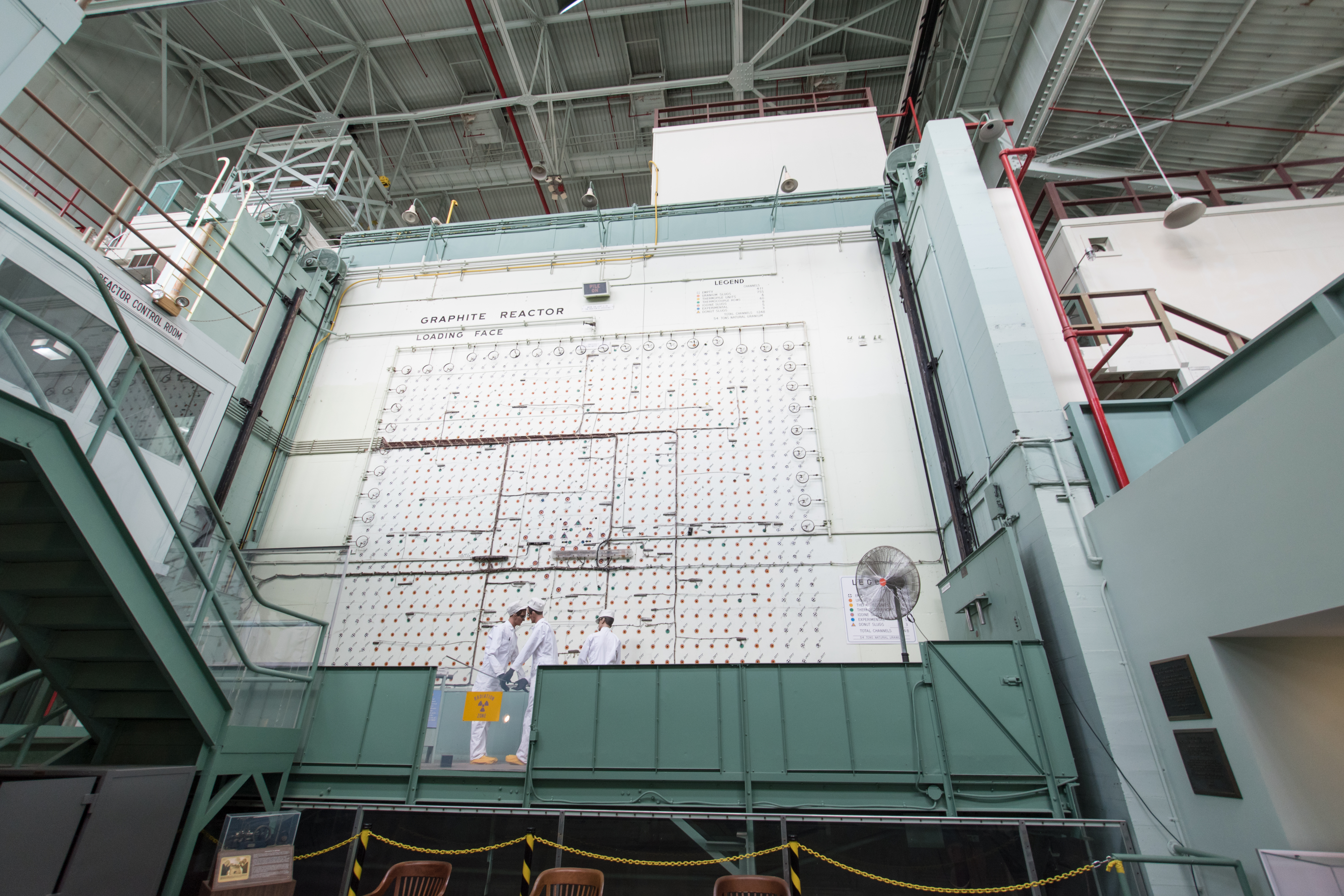
Loading face, 2019. The model steam engine is in the acrylic box at the lower left.

After the war ended, the graphite reactor became the first facility in the world to produce radioactive isotopes for peacetime use. On August 2, 1946, Oak Ridge National Laboratory director Eugene Wigner presented a small container of carbon-14 to the director of the Barnard Free Skin and Cancer Hospital, for medical use at the hospital in St. Louis, Missouri. Subsequent shipments of radioisotopes, primarily iodine-131, phosphorus-32, carbon-14, and molybdenum-99/technetium-99m, were for scientific, medical, industrial and agricultural uses.

In August 1948, the reactor was used to produce the first electricity derived from nuclear power. Uranium slugs within an aluminum tube were irradiated within the reactor core. Water was circulated through the tube by means of an automatic feedwater system to generate steam. This steam was fed to a model steam engine, a Jensen Steam Engines #50, which drove a small generator that powered a single bulb. The engine and generator are on display at the reactor loading face, just below the staircase leading to the loading platform.

The X-10 Graphite Reactor was shut down on November 4, 1963, after 20 years of use. It was designated a National Historic Landmark on December 21, 1965, and added to the National Register of Historic Places on October 15, 1966. In 1969 the American Society for Metals listed it as a landmark for its contributions to the advancement of materials science and technology, and in 2008 it was designated as a National Historic Chemical Landmark by the American Chemical Society. The control room and reactor face are accessible to the public during scheduled tours offered through the American Museum of Science and Energy.

== Similar reactors ==
The Brookhaven National Laboratory (BNL) Graphite Research Reactor was the first nuclear reactor to be constructed in the United States following World War II. Led by Lyle Benjamin Borst, the reactor construction began in 1947 and reached criticality on August 22, 1950. The reactor consisted of a 700-short-ton (640 t), 25-foot (7.6 m) cube of graphite fueled by natural uranium. Its primary mission was applied nuclear research in medicine, biology, chemistry, physics and nuclear engineering. One of the most significant discoveries at this facility was the development of production of molybdenum-99/technetium-99m, used today in tens of millions of medical diagnostic procedures annually, making it the most commonly used medical radioisotope. The BNL Graphite Research Reactor was shut down in 1969 and fully decommissioned in 2012.

When Britain began planning to build nuclear reactors to produce plutonium for weapons in 1946, it was decided to build a pair of air-cooled graphite reactors similar to the X-10 Graphite Reactor at Windscale. Natural uranium was used as enriched uranium was not available, and similarly graphite was chosen as a neutron moderator because beryllia was toxic and hard to manufacture, while heavy water was unavailable. Use of water as a coolant was considered, but there were concerns about the possibility of a catastrophic nuclear meltdown in the densely populated British Isles if the cooling system failed. Helium was again the preferred choice as a coolant gas, but the main source of it was the United States, and under the 1946 McMahon Act, the United States would not supply it for nuclear weapons production, so in the end air cooling was chosen. Construction began in September 1947, and the two reactors became operational in October 1950 and June 1951. Both were decommissioned after the disastrous Windscale fire in October 1957. They were the last major air-cooled plutonium-producing reactors; the UK's follow-on Magnox and AGR designs used carbon dioxide instead.

As of 2016, another reactor of similar design to the X-10 Graphite Reactor is still in operation, the Belgian BR-1 reactor of the SCK•CEN, located in Mol, Belgium. Financed through the Belgian uranium export tax, and built with the help of British experts, the 4 MW research reactor went critical on May 11, 1956. It is used for scientific purposes, such as neutron activation analysis, neutron physics experiments, calibration of nuclear measurement devices and the production of neutron transmutation doped silicon.
