= Mersey Model Co. Ltd. =

Maker of steam and other toys

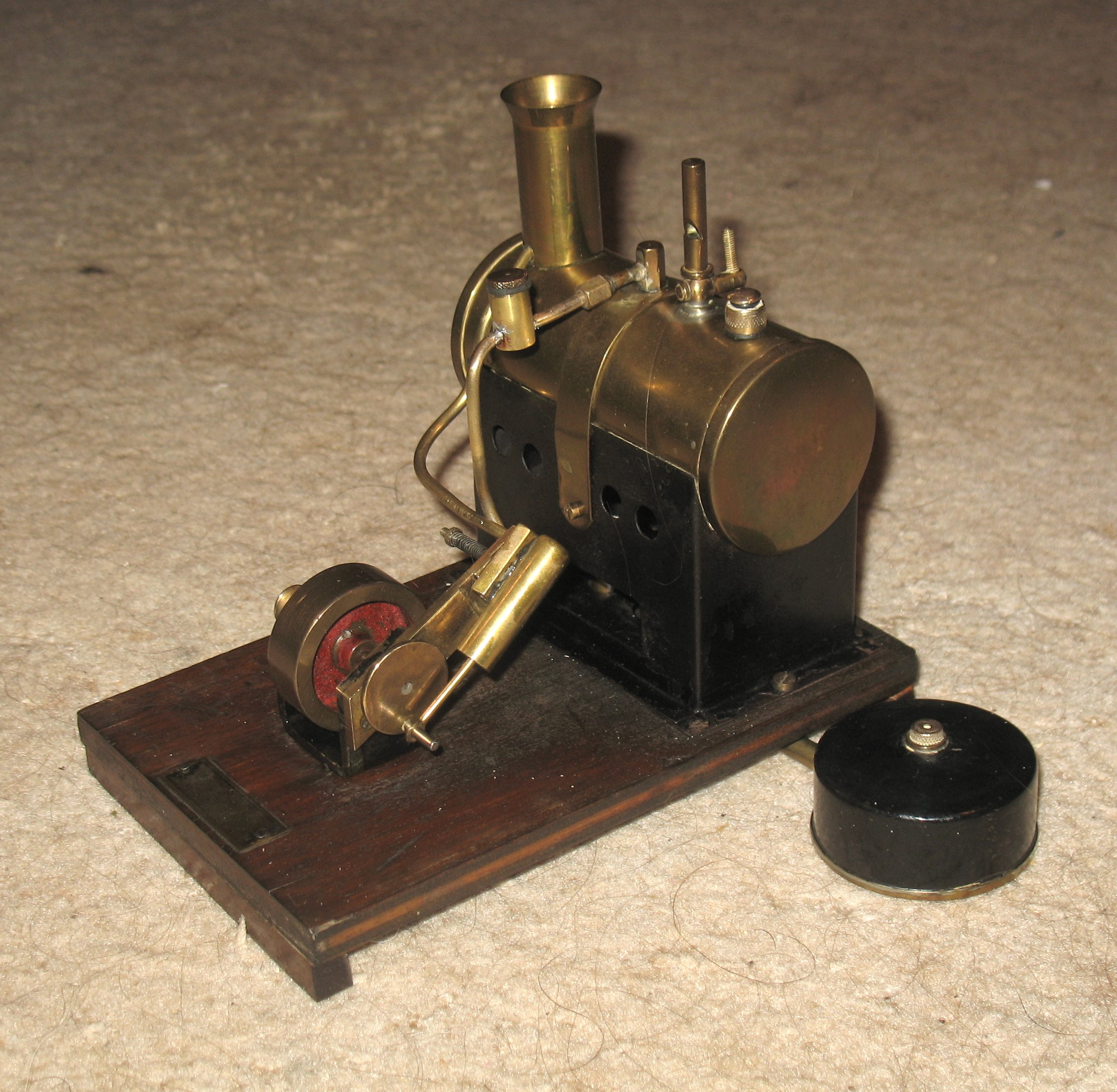
A typical Mersey Model Co Ltd toy steam engine - the model 52

Mersey Model Co. Ltd. was a company making model steam engines and other toys in Liverpool, UK. Founded by Ernest Claus around 1934, they made a small range of popular, well-made steam engines, many of which have survived to this day, including a range of steam-engine-powered model speed boats. Mersey Models exhibited at the British Industries Fair in 1936. The company offices were initially at 34 Peter's Lane in Liverpool and later in the Cooper's Building on Church Street. The factory was located across the River Mersey in Wallasey.

Manufacturing stopped at the outbreak of the Second World War, in 1939, when the factory was needed for the war effort. The models remained on sale until 1941. Cooper's Building was damaged by fire after bombing on 6 May, 1941, but Mersey Models had already been wound up by then.

== Products ==
Mersey Models' products were mainly steam powered models/toys and related accessories. One of the earliest known advertisements featuring a Mersey Models engine shows a Model 51 and was placed by Hamleys in the November 1934 issue of the Meccano Magazine.

=== Stationary engines ===
Stationary models that have been identified are 51, 52, 53, 54 and 55. Models 52, 53, 54, and 55 were available with options designated by suffixes on the model number: G = geared output, R = reversible, and D = dynamo. The R option was available for all 4 models, the G and GR options were only available for models 52 and 53, and the D option was only available with model 54. Model 51 did not have any options available.

=== Boats ===
Two boat models have been identified, although the main difference was just colouring. These were Miss Mersey I and II. The steam engine used in these boats was available separately, advertised as Mersey Steam Boat Engine No.2.

=== Accessories ===
Mersey Models included a small range of machine tool accessories in their catalogue. These included a grindstone, circular saw, power press, drilling machine and a lathe. These accessories are very rare today.

=== One-off models ===
There are some rare and one-off models which have been found and identified as having been made by Mersey, which were prototypes or special commissions. One example of this is an engine with a thermosetting plastic base. All other known Mersey models have wooden bases and the use of plastics in manufacturing was in its infancy at the time. Mersey advertised to the trade their ability to build special commissions to order.
