= Weeden Manufacturing =

American toy company

- Industry: Toy Making
- Founded: 1884
- Defunct: c. 1952
- Headquarters: United States
- Products: Model Steam Engines, Electric Motors, Toys.

Weeden Manufacturing was a toy company best known for producing Model steam engines and electric motors. They started making toy steam engines in October 1884 to sell via Magazine, and went on to make 100 different styles. Weeden made its own tooling for all the engines they made. From 1890 to 1912 Weeden made a steam powered toy train. In the 1920s Weeden ventured into children's banks and electric stoves. In 1942 they were purchased by the National Playthings division of Pairpoint Glass. The last steam engine was made 10 years later in 1952.

The Weeden Manufacturing Co. was at one time associated with Joseph Arthur Beauvais (1824-1899) of New Bedford MA who also managed several other companies in New Bedford and the area including two railroads.

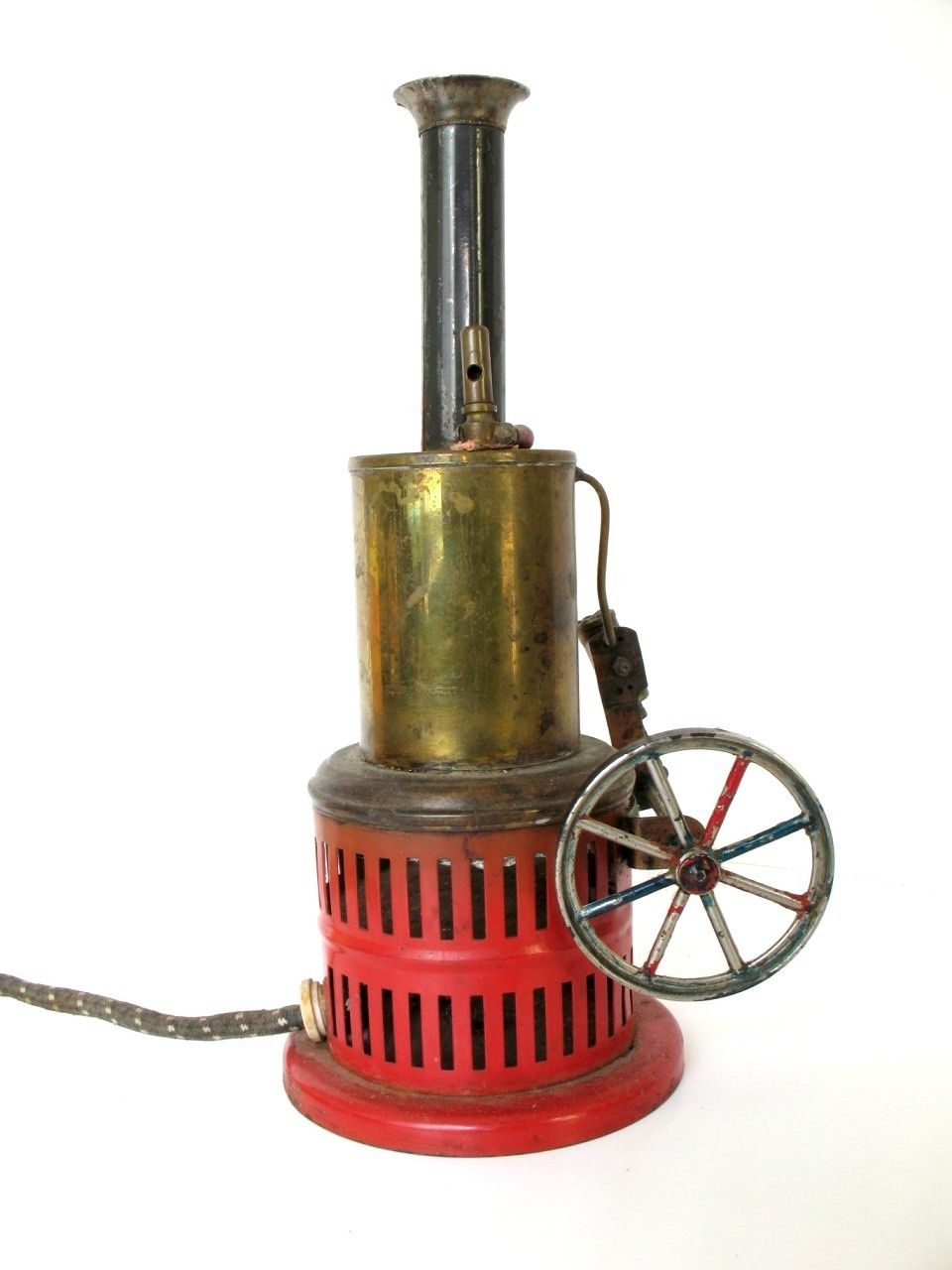
1951 Weeden model 420
