= Wilesco =

German toy company

Wilhelm Schröder GmbH & Co. KG (Wilesco)
- Company type: GmbH & Co. KG
- Industry: Toys and metal goods
- Founded: 1912
- Founder: Wilhelm Schröder; Ernst Wortmann
- Headquarters: Lüdenscheid, Germany
- Area served: Worldwide
- Key people: Philip Schröder (CEO)
- Products: Mainly toy steam engines and accessories
- Website: wilesco.de

Wilesco is the trade name of German toy company Wilhelm Schröder GmbH & Co. KG, known for manufacturing live steam toys such as steamrollers, traction engines, stationary steam engines, and numerous accessories such as countershafts and drive models.

Initially a producer of aluminium forks and spoons, the company expanded into miniature aluminium accessories for doll's tea parties in the 1920s. This decision also helped the company weather the economic crisis of the late 1920s and early 1930s because these toys were also exported to the US.

In 1950, Wilesco started manufacturing miniature steam engines. In 1966, the D36 "Old Smokey" steamroller was introduced which has been popular among collectors and continues to be produced.

The company also manufactures various accessories for their steam engines such as electrical generators, steam workshops and fairground rides. While most of their steam engine models are heated by esbit, electrical heating is also available. Steam-powered toy locomotives (G scale) and an open wagon were also available from Wilesco for a while.

The company still manufactures a range of plastic and aluminium scoops and hooks, as well as steam toys.

Wilesco's main rival is the British-based steam model manufacturer: Mamod. Mamod and Wilesco produce similar models, at similar prices and size range. In August 2024, Mamod closed.

== Gallery ==
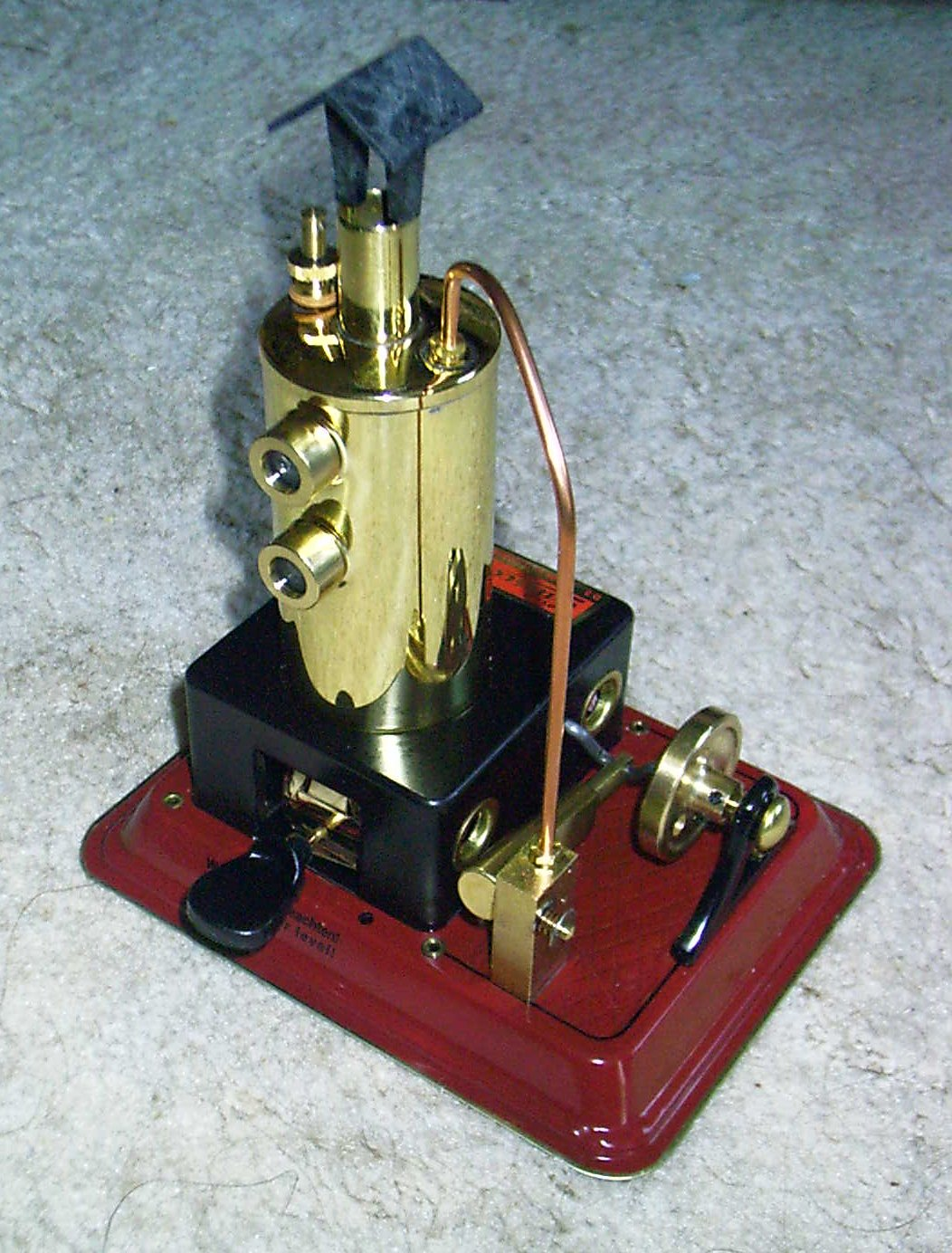
D3, one of the lowest-priced Wilesco engines

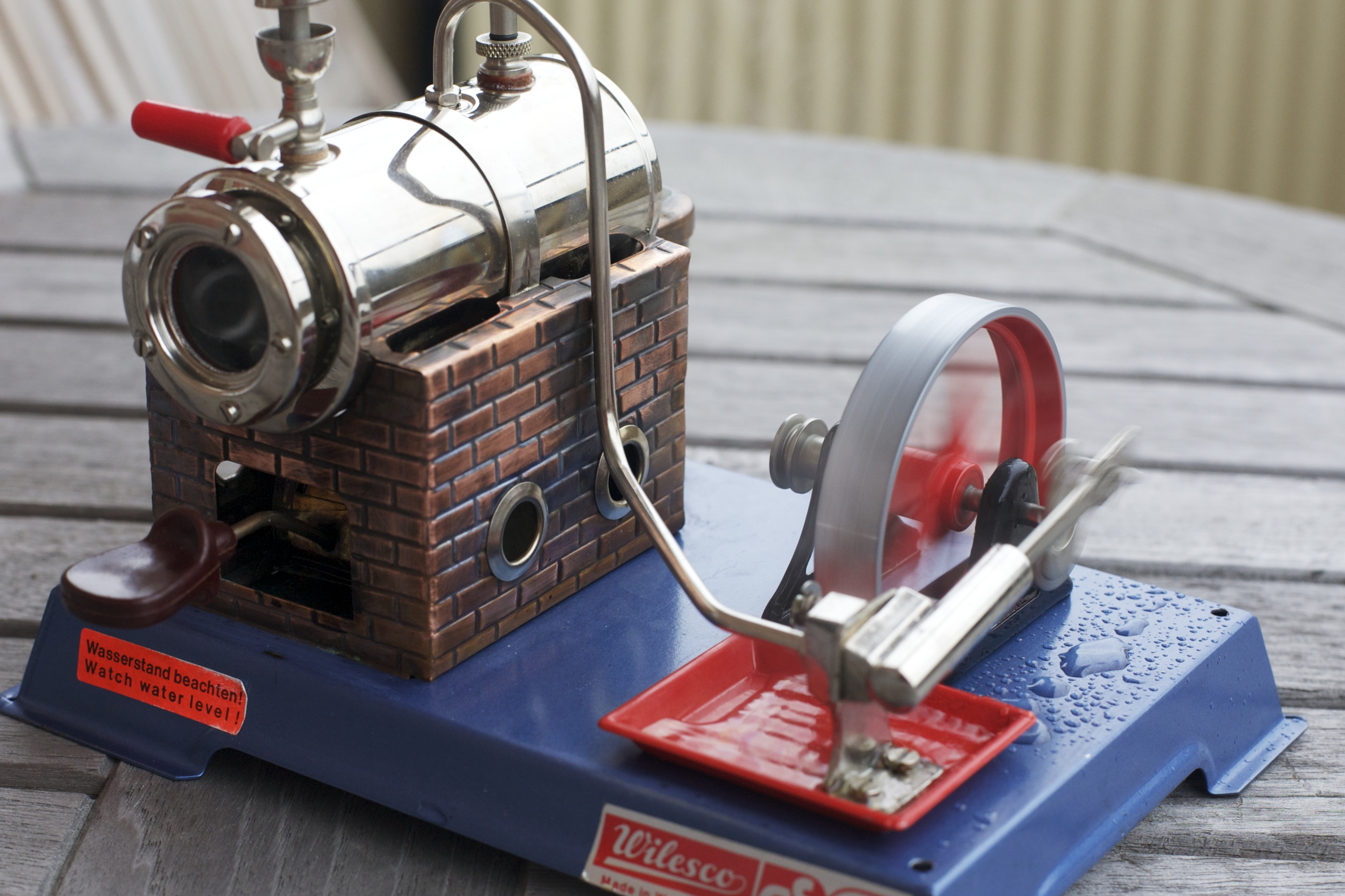
A running Wilesco D6

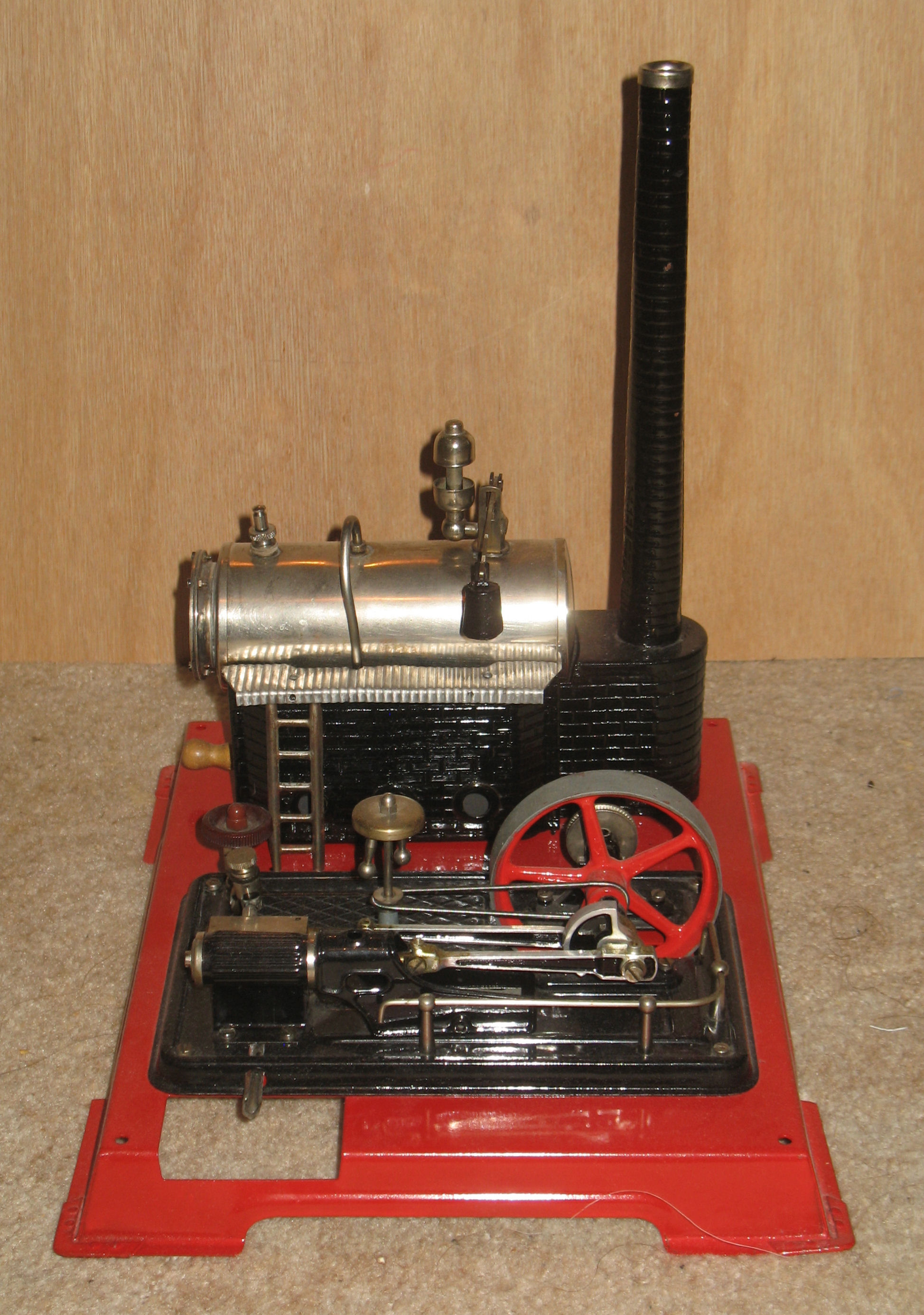
Wilesco D16; 1970s (colours not original)

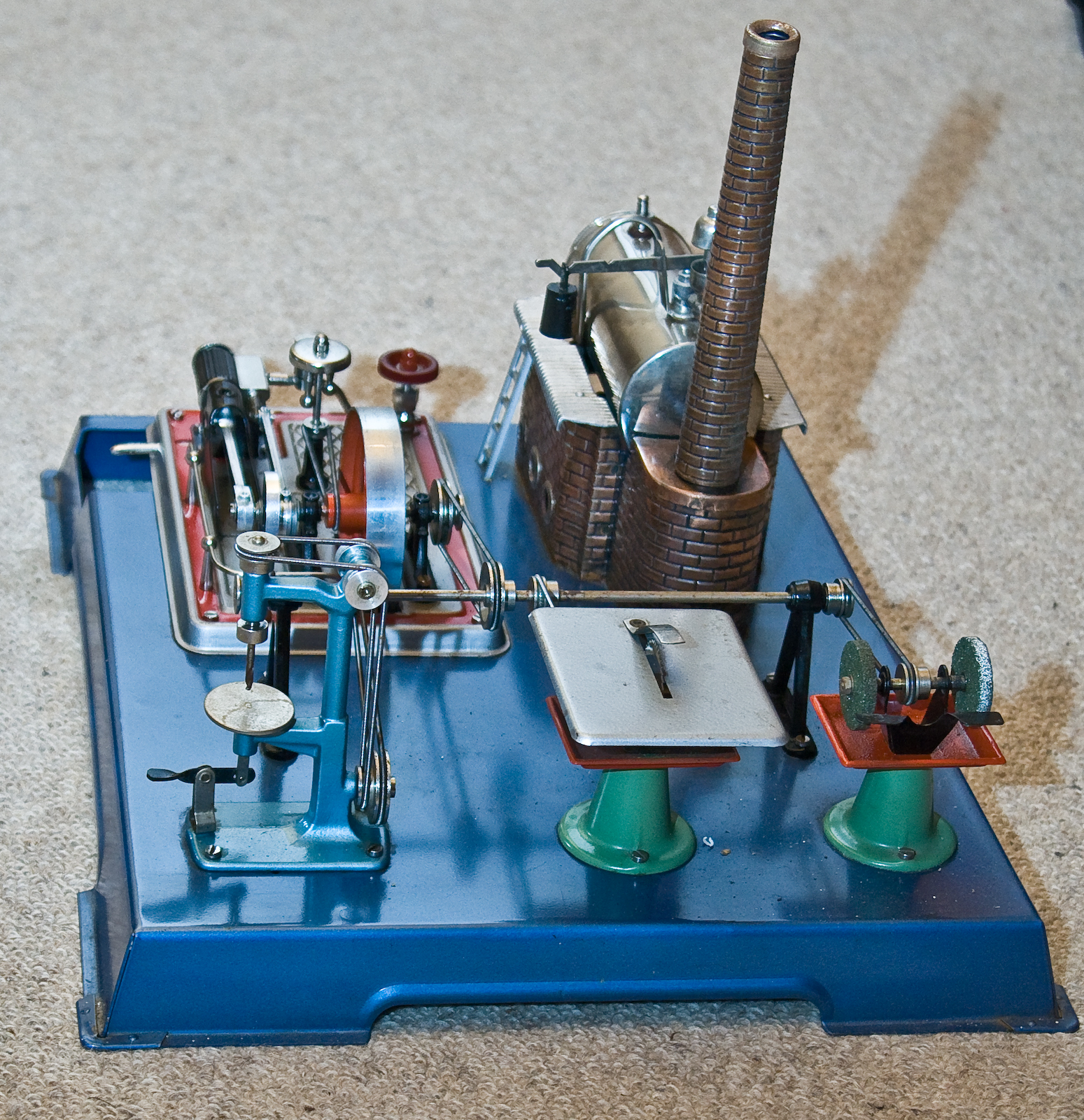
Wilesco D161 (same engine as D16, but with workshop)

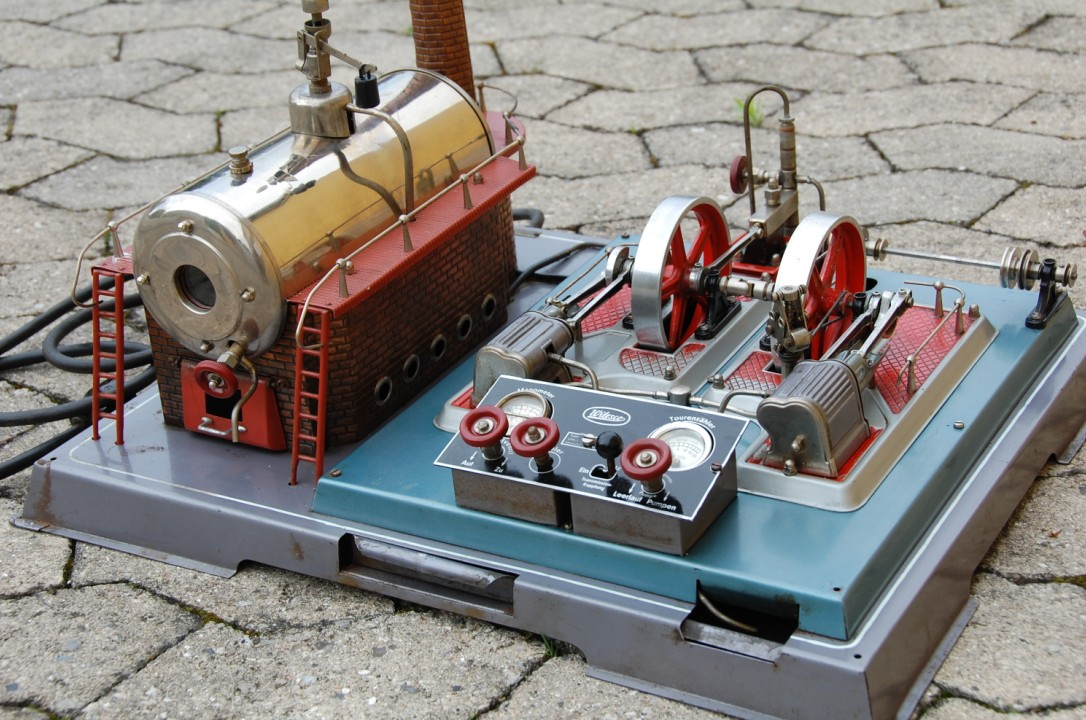
A 1970s twin-cylinder D32

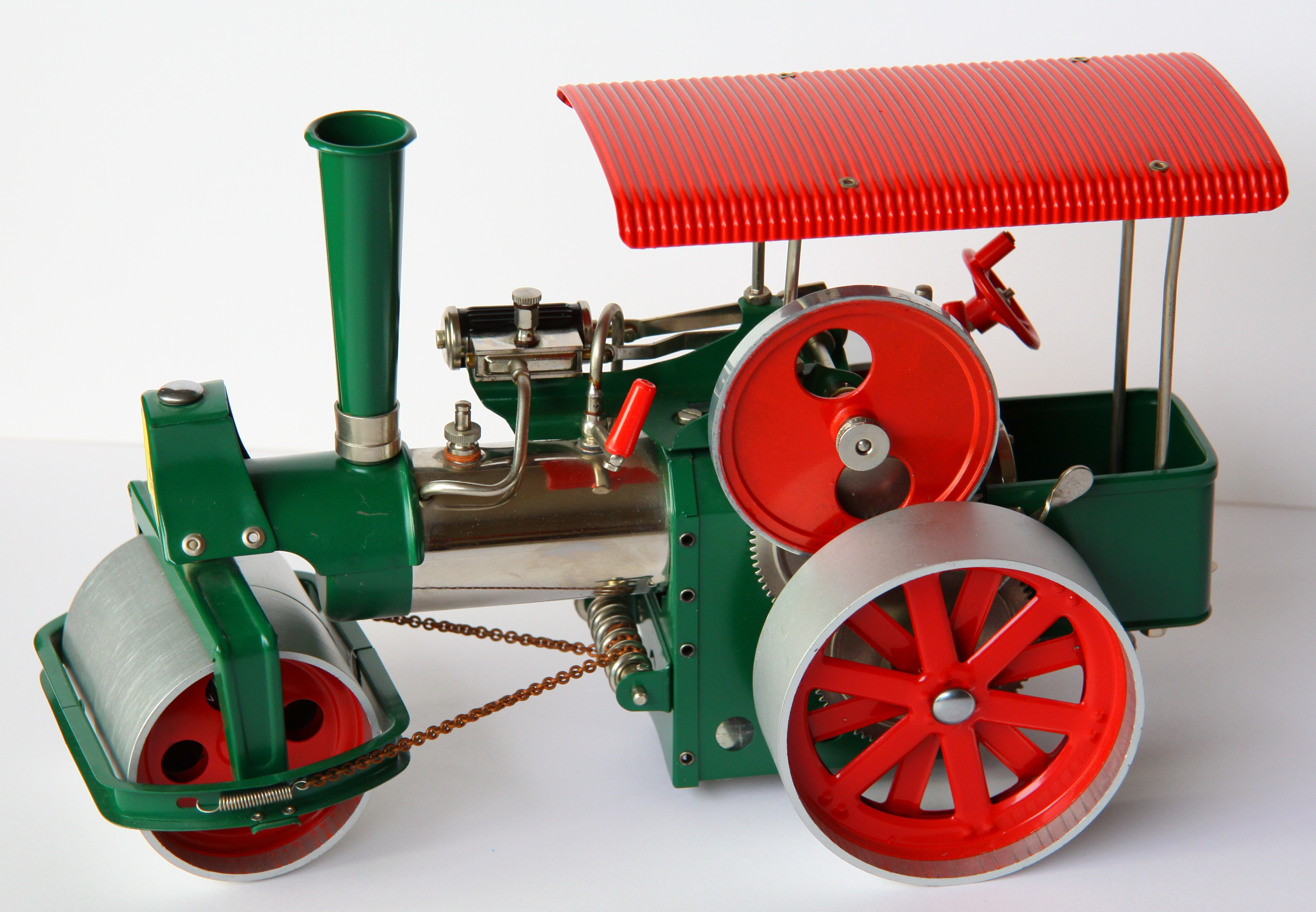
"Old Smokey" D36 steamroller (1980s)

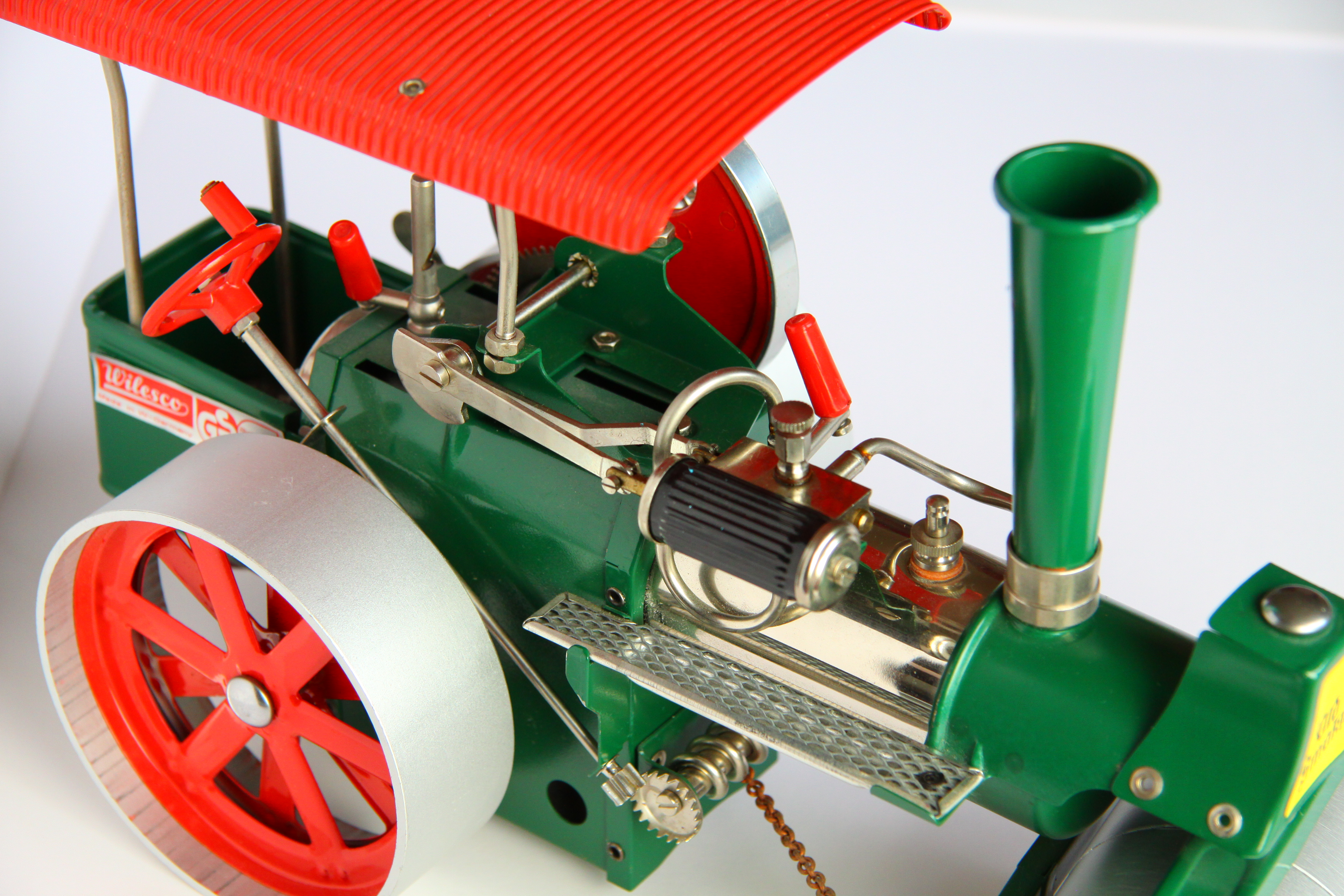
Closeup view of the steam cylinder and safety valve of "Old Smokey"

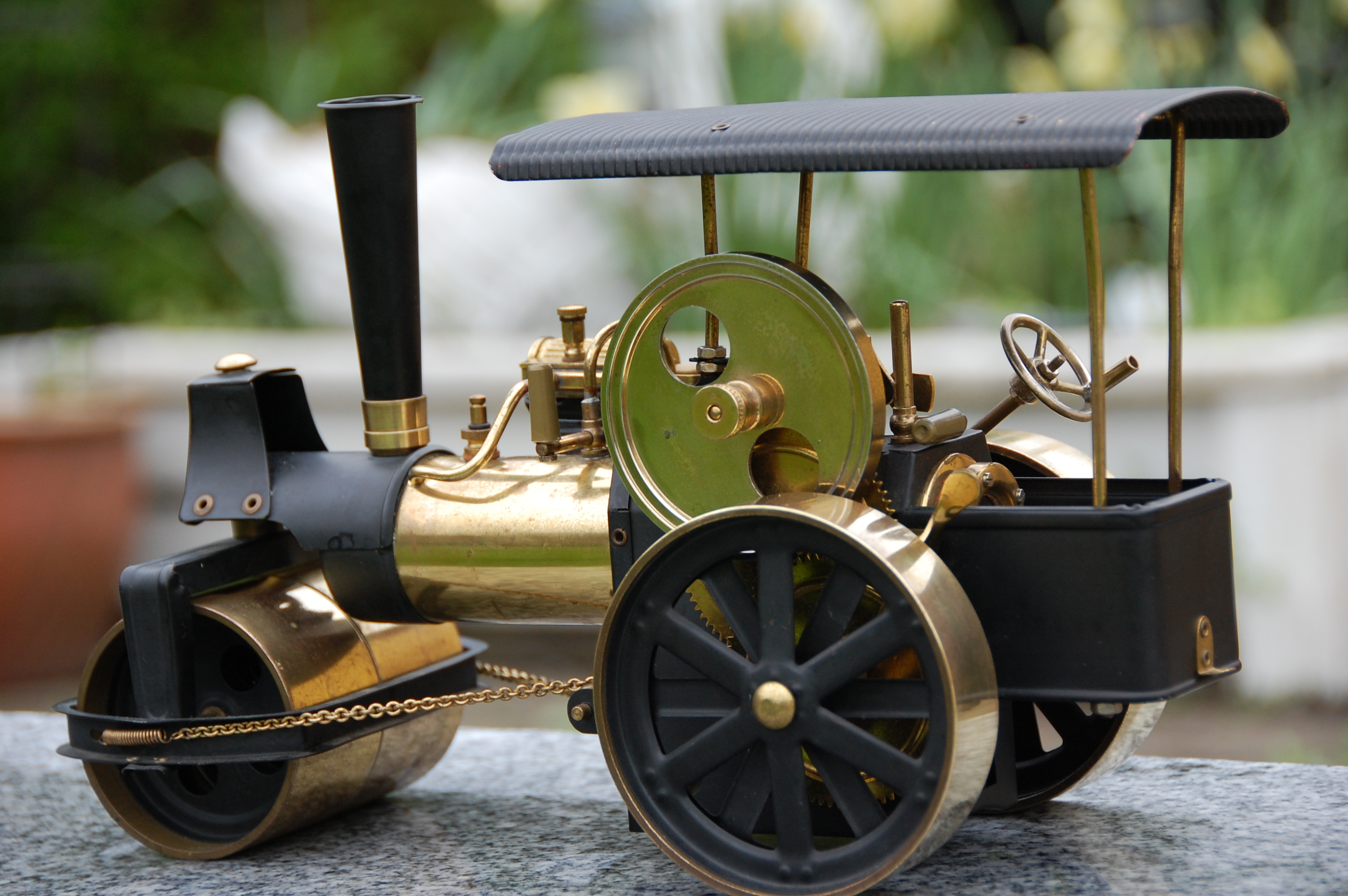
D366, an all-brass version of "Old Smokey"

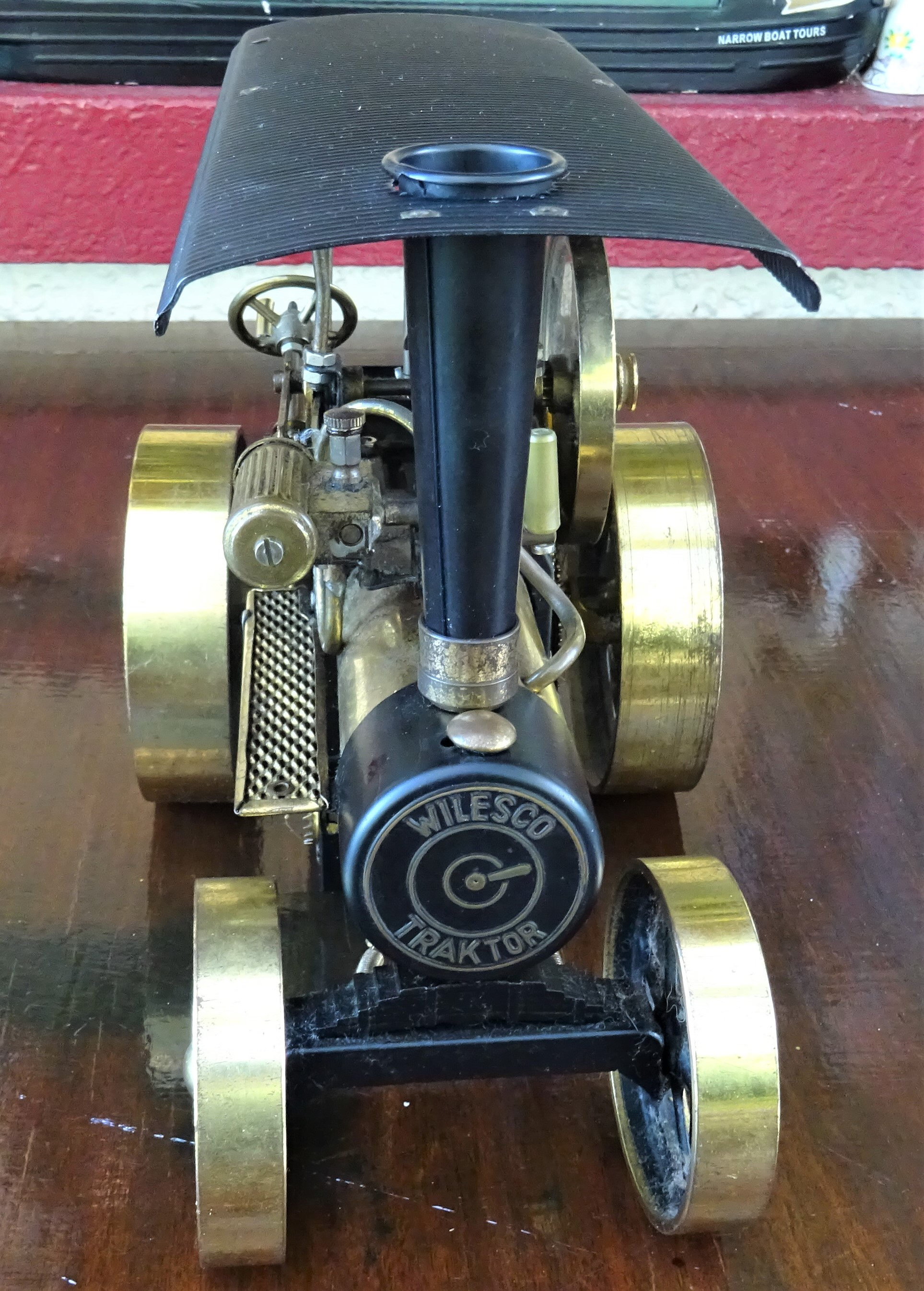
Wilesco D40 model steam traction engine - front view

== See also ==
- Mamod
