= Model steam engine =

Steam engine used as a demonstration model

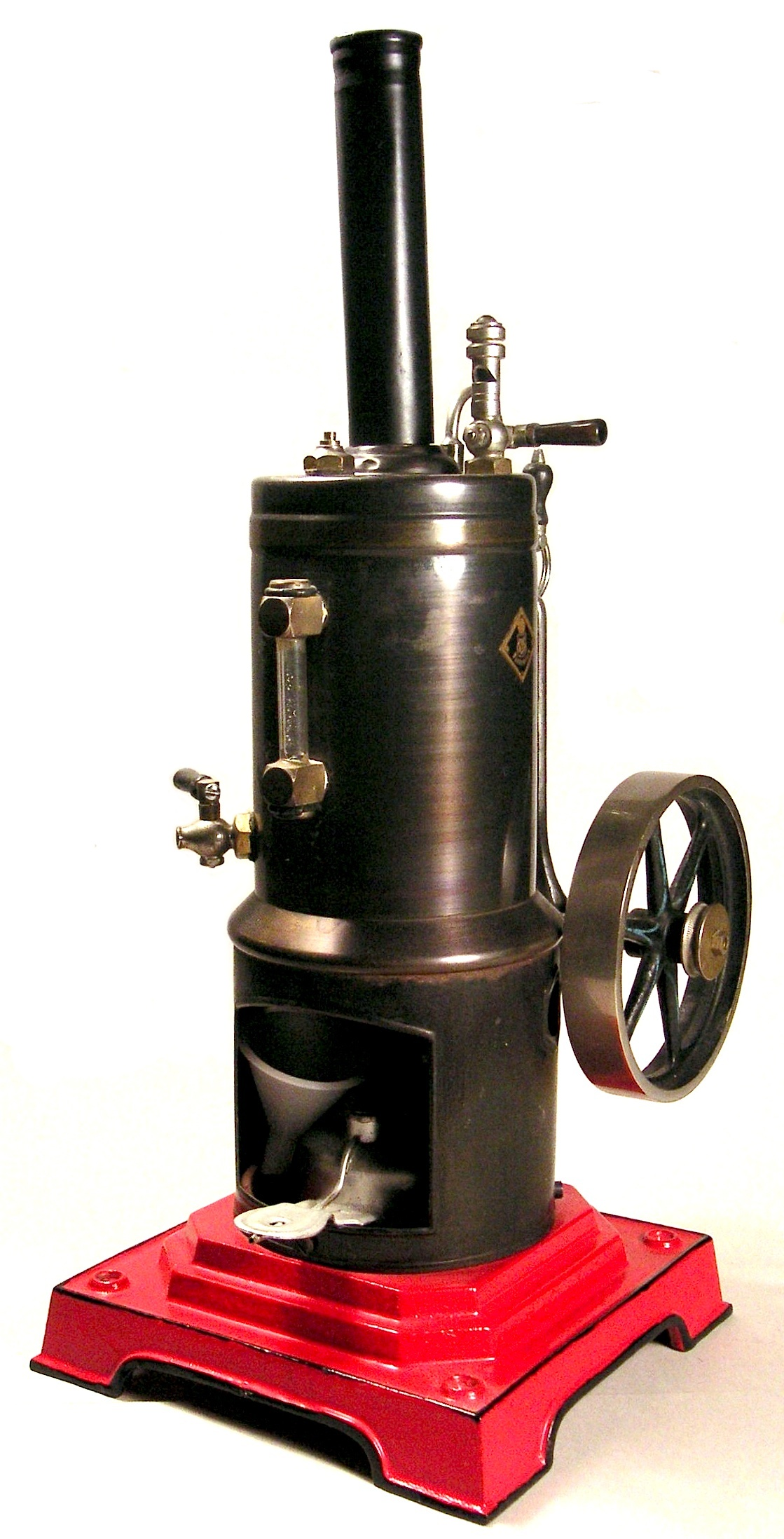
Stationary model steam engine by Märklin, 1909

A model steam engine is a small steam engine not built for serious use. Often they are built as an educational toy for children, in which case it is also called a toy steam engine, or for live steam enthusiasts. Between the 18th and early 20th centuries, demonstration models were also in use at universities and engineering schools, frequently designed and built by students as part of their curriculum.

Model steam engines have been made in many forms by a number of manufacturers, but building model steam engines from scratch is popular among adult steam enthusiasts, although this generally requires access to a lathe and/or milling machine. Those without a lathe can alternatively purchase prefabricated parts.

== History ==
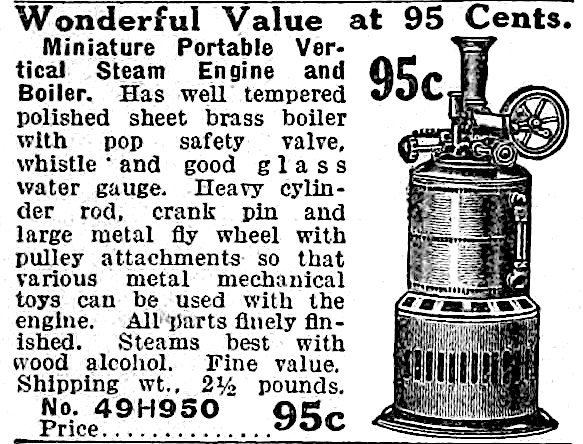
Weeden Vertical toy steam engine in the 1912 Sears, Roebuck and Co. catalog

In the late 19th century, manufacturers such as German toy company Bing introduced the two main types of model/toy steam engines, namely stationary engines with accessories that were supposed to mimic a 19th-century factory, and mobile engines such as steam locomotives and boats. Later, especially in the early 20th century, steam rollers, fire engines, traction engines and steam wagons began to appear. At the peak of their popularity, around the mid 20th century, there were hundreds of companies making steam toys and models. Today, companies such as Wilesco (Germany), Mamod (UK), and Jensen (US) continue to produce model/toy steam engines.

== Design features ==
Märklin steam engine 1909, in function, video.

Toy steam engines will commonly have fewer features (such as mechanical lubricators or governors), and operate at lower pressures, while model steam engines will place more emphasis on similarity to life-sized engines. Manufacturers such as Wilesco sell both simple toy engines for beginners (e.g. the D3) and more intricate model engines that are meant to be used to drive things like workshops or boats.

Model steam engines typically use hexamine fuel tablets, methylated spirits (aka meths or denatured alcohol), butane gas, or electricity to heat the boiler. Cylinders are either oscillating (single-acting or double-acting) or fixed cylinder using slide-valves, piston valves or poppet valves (normally double-acting). Spring safety valves and steam whistles are other common features of model steam engines. Some stationary engines also have feedwater pumps to replenish boiler water, allowing them to run indefinitely as long as sufficient fuel is available.

== Gallery ==
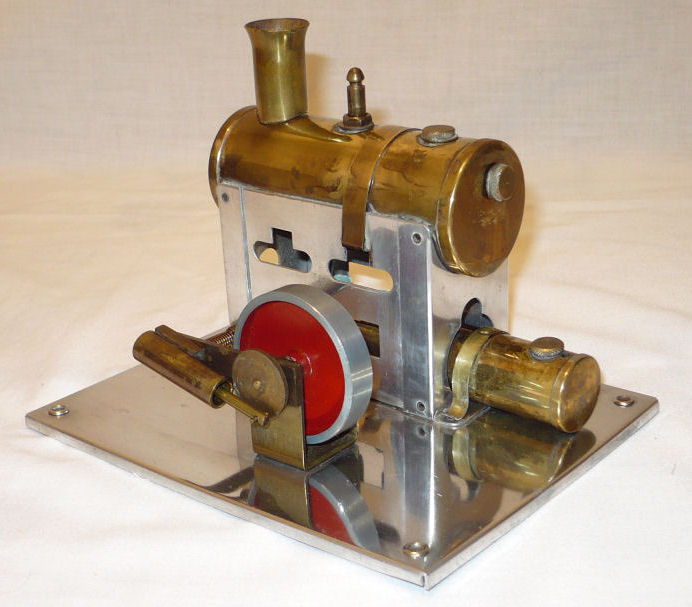
Vintage oscillating-cylinder engine by Cyldon

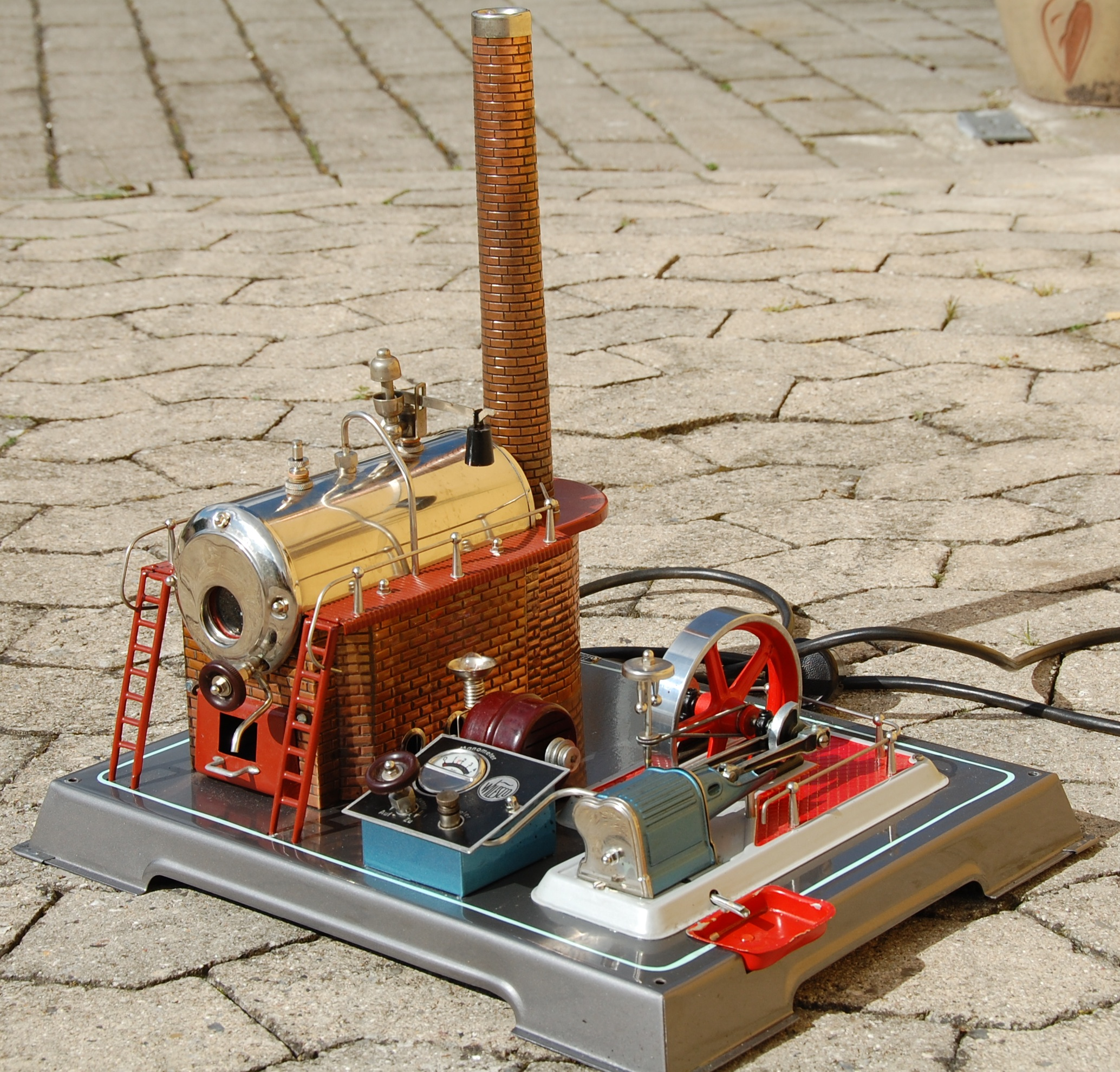
Electrically heated Wilesco D24

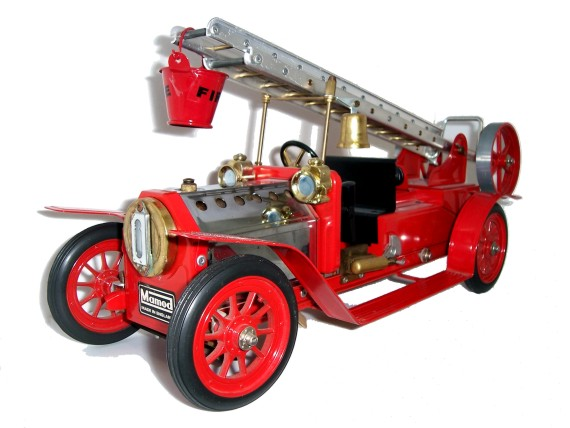
Mamod fire engine

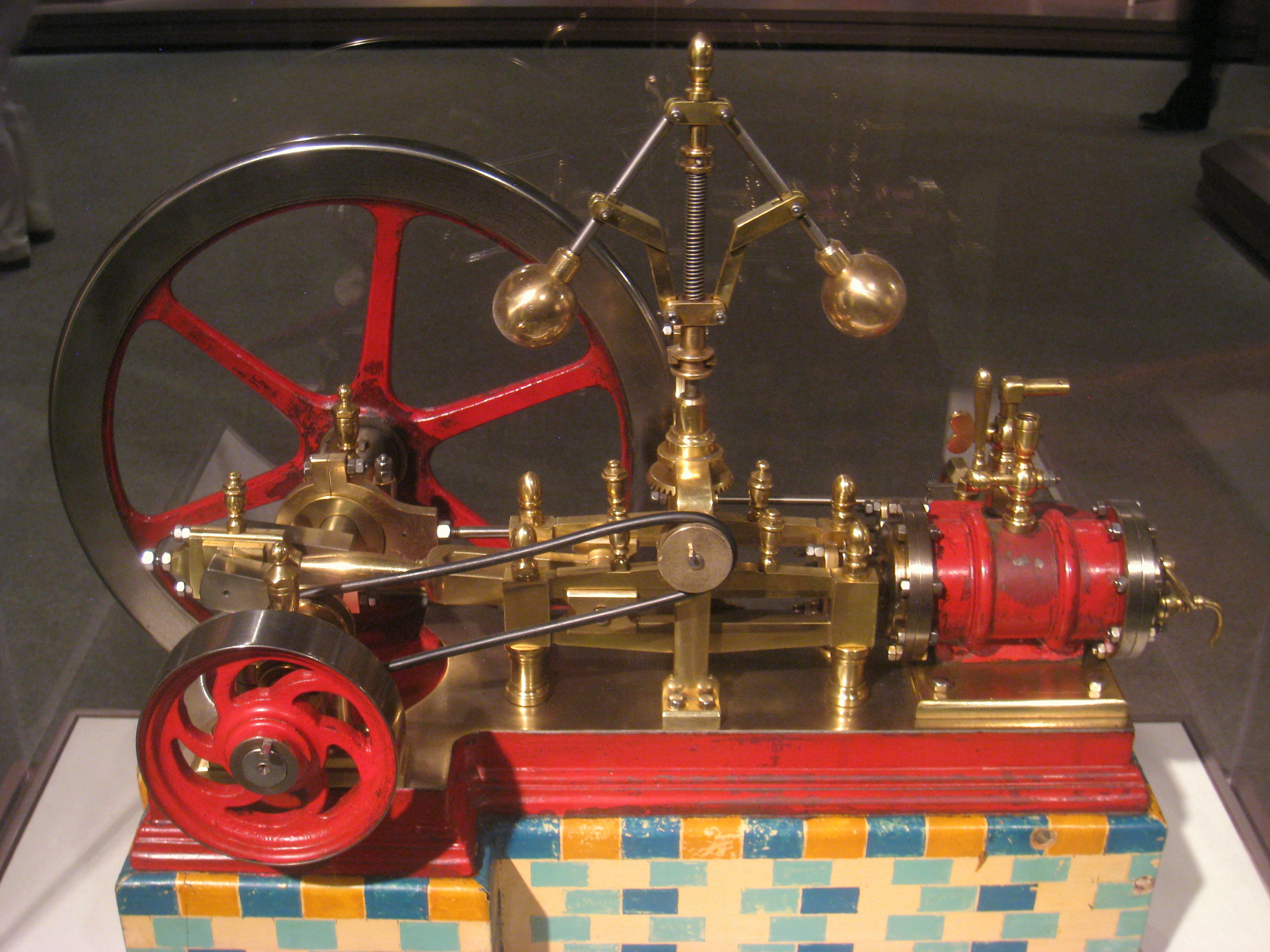
Model steam engine in the Wolfsonian-FIU museum

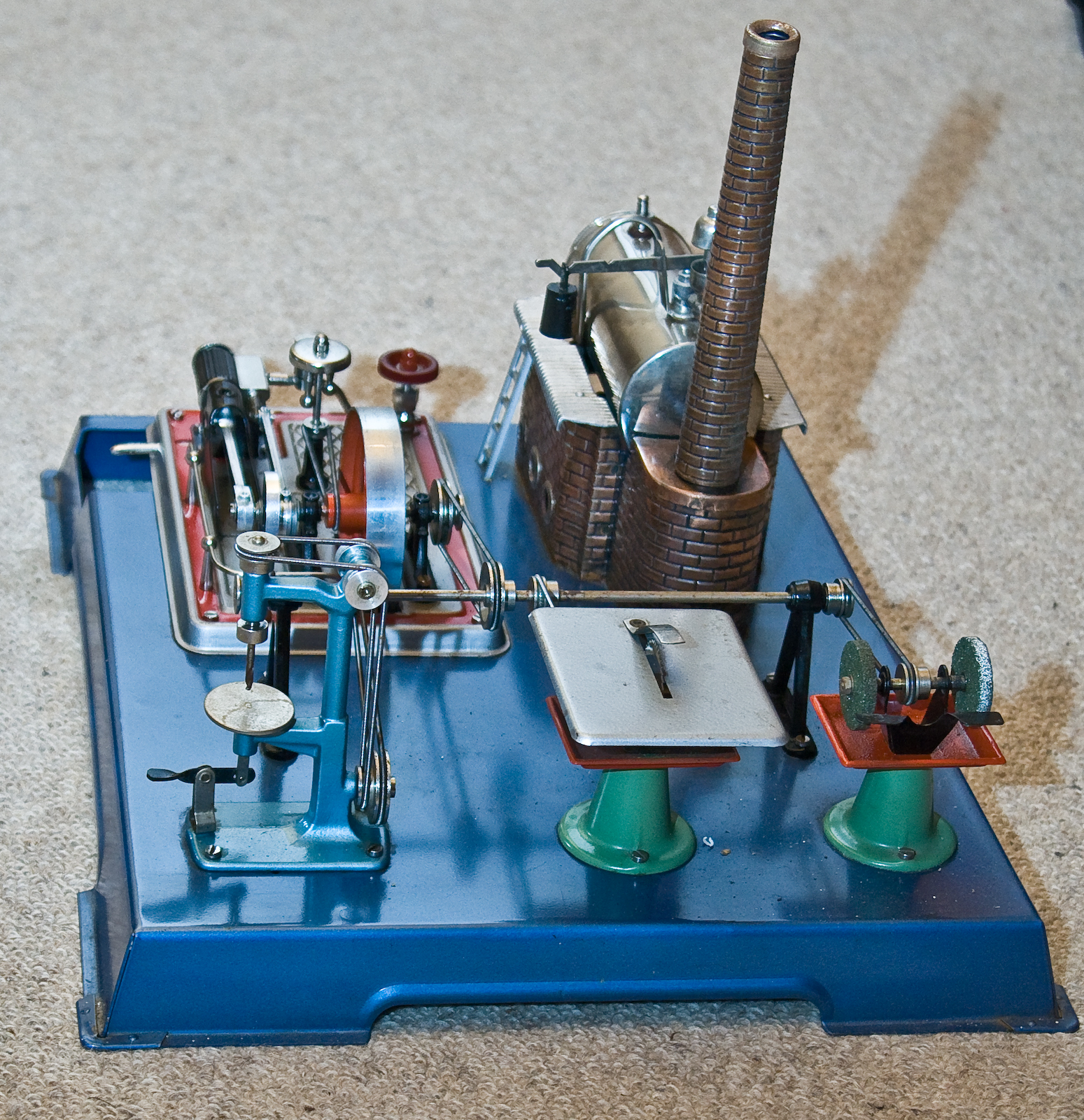
Model steam engine with attached workshop

== See also ==
- Live steam
- Model engineering

== References and further reading ==
- Stan Bray: Making Simple Model Steam Engines, 192 pp, ISBN 1-86126-773-8
- Tubal Cain: Building Simple Model Steam Engines, 112 pp, ISBN 1-85486-104-2
- Paul Hasluck: The Model Engineer's Handybook: A Practical Manual on Model Steam Engines. Archive.org e-book
- Bob Gordon: Toy Steam Engines, ISBN 978-0-85263-775-3
- Bob Gordon: Model Steam Engines, ISBN 978-0-85263-906-1
- Category:Toy steam engine manufacturers
