= Hexamine fuel tablet =

Solid fuel in tablet form

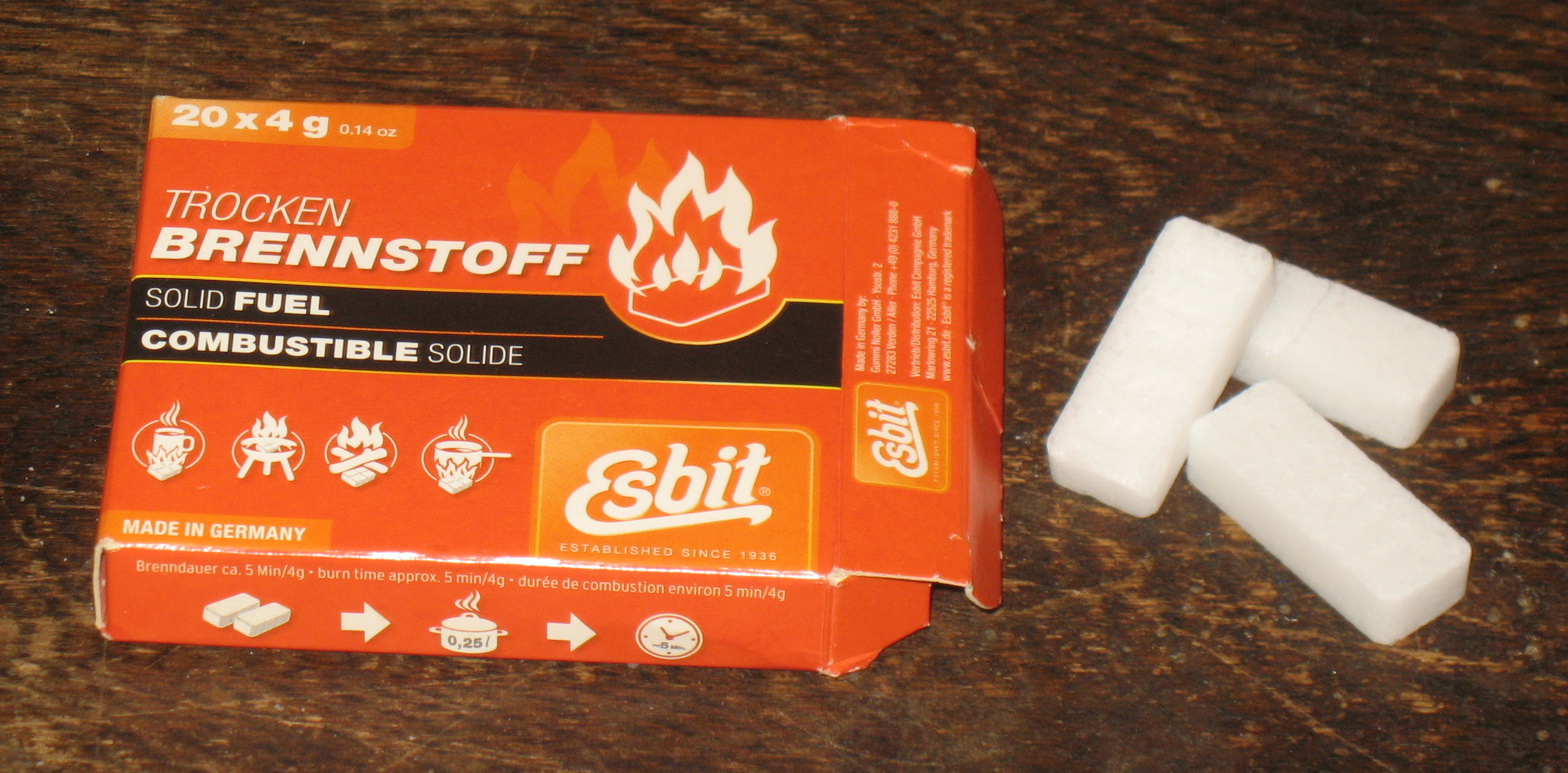
Esbit brand hexamine tablets

A hexamine fuel tablet (or heat tablet, Esbit) is a form of solid fuel in tablet form. The tablets burn smokelessly, have a high energy density, do not liquefy while burning and leave no ashes. Invented in 1936 in Murrhardt, Germany, the main component is hexamine, which was discovered by Aleksandr Butlerov in 1859. Some fuel tablets use 1,3,5-trioxane as another ingredient.

Esbit is a genericized trademark that people often use to refer to similar products made by other companies. In most countries from the former Soviet bloc, fuel tablets are called dry fuel.

== Uses ==
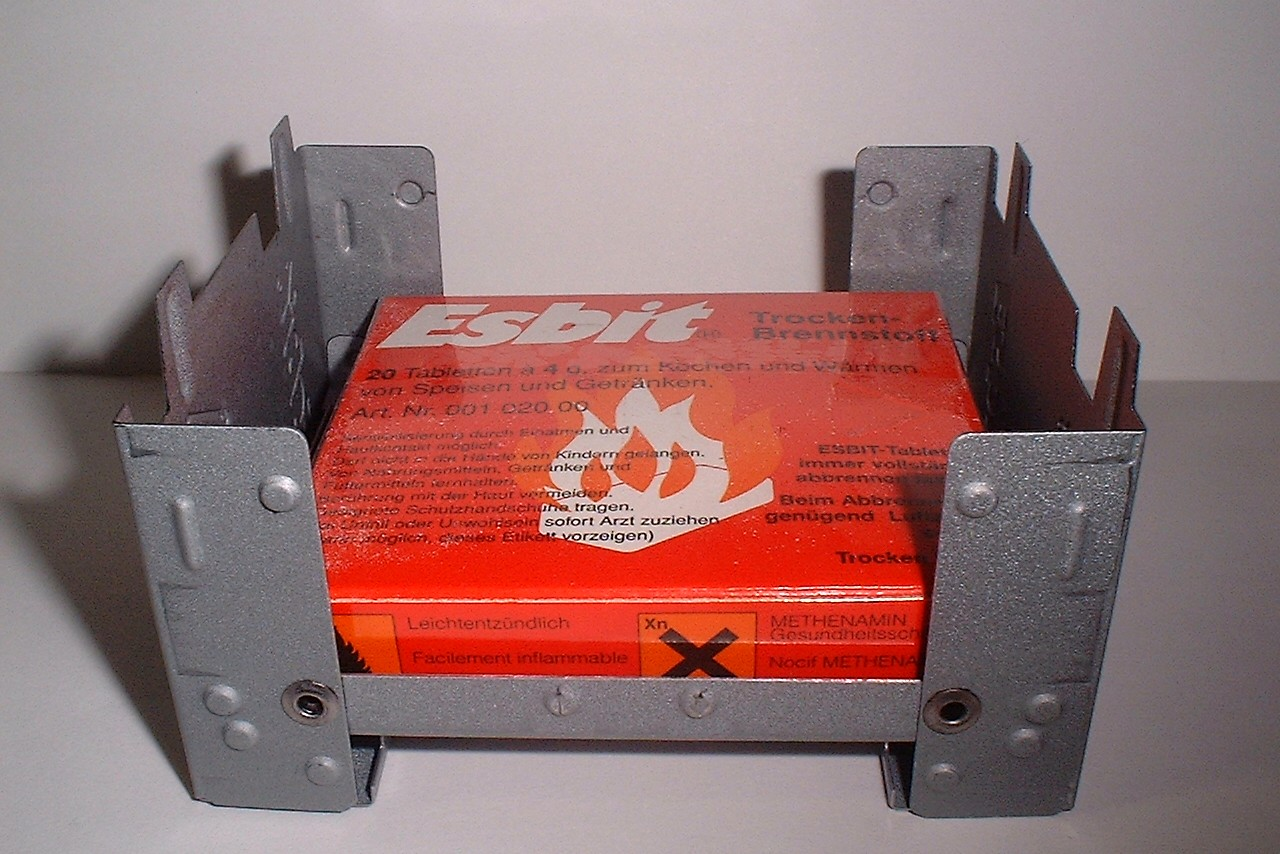
Folding hexamine stove with packaged fuel

The tablets are used for cooking by campers, militaries, and relief organizations. They are often used with disposable metal stoves that are included with field ration packs. Another common use is to provide a heat source for model steam engines, such as those manufactured by Wilesco and Mamod, and other external combustion engines such as Stirling engines and pop pop boats.

== Advantages and disadvantages ==
Hexamine is prepared by the reaction of formaldehyde and ammonia. In an acidic environment hexamine is converted to toxic formaldehyde, where the main hazard for toxicity is by ingestion.

As with trioxane, hexamine has an almost unlimited shelf life if stored properly, in a sealed dry container. However, the heat given off cannot be easily adjusted, so water can be boiled, but cooking requiring simmering is more difficult. Tablets are a powerful stove fuel (30.0 MJ/kg), but are sensitive to wind and dampness.

Esbit's Safety Data Sheet states combustion can create formaldehyde, ammonia, nitrogen oxide, hydrogen cyanide and ingestion may cause nausea, vomiting, gastrointestinal disturbances, and kidney damage. When burned, the chemical oxidation of the fuel yields noxious fumes, which requires cooking foods in a container, such as a pot or pan, with a tight fitting lid. Burned tablets leave a sticky dark residue on the bottom of pots. If tablets are stored or used under damp conditions they can break up while burning and shed burning fragments, though this claim is hard to verify or reproduce.

As hexamine is a precursor for the simplest synthesis of the chemical explosive RDX, its possession is tightly regulated in the United Kingdom.

== See also ==
- Firelighter
- Metaldehyde
- Sterno
