= Merit =

Merit may refer to:

== Religion ==
- Merit (Buddhism)
- Merit (Christianity)

== Companies and brands ==
- Merit (cigarette), a brand of cigarettes
- Merit Energy Company, an international energy company
- Merit Motion Pictures, an independent documentary film and television production company based in Winnipeg, Manitoba, Canada
- Merit Network, a nonprofit organization providing high-performance computer networking and related services to educational, government, health care, and nonprofit organizations, primarily in Michigan, United States
- Merit Packaging Limited, a subsidiary of the Lakson Group
- Merit (TV channel), a short-lived UK television channel
- Merit, a trading name used by J & L Randall
- A chain of gas stations owned by Meadville Corporation before it was purchased by Hess Corporation

== People ==
- Merit Cudkowicz, American neurologist and neuroscientist
- Merit Frost Lindberg (born 1973), Swedish politician
- Merit Hertzman-Ericson (1911–1998), Swedish psychologist and author
- Merit Janow, American professor
- Merit or Meryt, an ancient Egyptian feminine name, from the Egyptian language meaning "beloved":
  - Merit, wife of the ancient Egyptian royal scribe and architect Kha; interred with her husband in the tomb of Kha and Merit
  - Merit, wife of the ancient Egyptian royal treasurer Maya

== Schools ==
- Merit School of Music, a music education organization in Chicago, Illinois, United States
- Merit Academy, a high school in Springville, Utah, United States

== Other uses ==
- Merit, Texas, United States, an unincorporated community
- USS Merit, a World War II coastal minesweeper
- Merit (indie rock band), an American band
- Merit, in mathematics a ratio associated with the prime gap

== See also ==
- Demerit (disambiguation)
- Merit badge (Boy Scouts of America)
- Merit good, a commodity which is judged that an individual or society should have on the basis of need
- Merit pay
- Meritt (disambiguation)
- Merrit (disambiguation)
- Merritt (disambiguation)
