= Meritt =

Meritt may refer to:

== People ==
- Benjamin Dean Meritt (1899–1989), American classical scholar
- Harry Meritt (1920–2004), English footballer
- Lucy Taxis Shoe Meritt (1906–2003), American archaeologist
- Paul Meritt (1843–1895), British dramatist
- Meritt H. Steger (1906–1998), General Counsel of the United States Navy

== Other uses ==
- Meritt Records (1925), American jazz and blues record label active 1925 to 1929
- Meritt Records (1979), American jazz record label founded 1979
- Meritt, California, now spelled Merritt

== See also ==
- Merit (disambiguation)
- Merrit (disambiguation)
- Merritt (disambiguation)
