= Merritt =

Merritt may refer to:

- Merritt (given name)
- Merritt (surname)

== Places ==
Canada

- Merritt, British Columbia

United States

- Merritt, California
  - Merritt Island AVA, California wine region in Yolo County
- Merritt, Michigan
- Merritt Township, Michigan
- Merritt, Missouri
- Merritt, South Dakota
- Merritt, Washington
- Merritt Island, Florida

== Other ==
- Merritt Building, in Los Angeles, California
- Merritt Parkway, a limited-access highway in Connecticut, United States, known as "The Merritt"

== See also ==
- Merit (disambiguation)
- Meritt (disambiguation)
- Merrit (disambiguation)
- Merritt Island (disambiguation)
