= Waiting for the End (disambiguation) =

"Waiting for the End" is a 2010 song by Linkin Park.

Waiting for the End may also refer to:

== Books ==
- Waiting for the End, book by Leslie A. Fiedler 1964

== Music ==
- "Waiting for the End", song by Honor Bright
- "Waiting for the End", song by VanVelzen
- "Waiting for the End", song by The Call (band) composed by Michael Been
- "Waiting for the End", song by PINS (band) composed by PINS
- "Waiting for the End", song by Vitamin String Quartet
- "Waiting for the End", song by Thomas Troelsen
- "Waiting for the End of the World", song by Elvis Costello from My Aim Is True
