= Earning =

Earning can refer to:

- Labour (economics)
- Earnings of a company
- Merit

== See also ==
- Earn (disambiguation)
