= 16 mm (disambiguation) =

16 mm film is a popular, economical gauge of film, and its width.

16 mm may also refer to:

- 16 mm scale, a popular scale of model railway in the UK, with a ratio of 16 mm to 1 foot
- Ann Arbor Film Festival, a film festival formerly known as the 16mm Film Festival
- 16mm Mystery, a 2004 short film directed by the Brothers Strause
