= Don't Tell Mama =

Don't Tell Mama may refer to:

== Music ==
- "Don't Tell Mama", a song from the 1966 Broadway musical Cabaret by Kander and Ebb
- "Don't Tell Mama", a 1996 song by Ty Herndon on the album Living in a Moment
- "Don't Tell Mama", a 2010 song by Honor Bright on the album Action! Drama! Suspense!

== Venues ==
- Don't Tell Mama, a piano bar, restaurant and cabaret venue on West 46th Street in Manhattan, New York City
- DTM, a nightclub in Helsinki, originally called Don't Tell Mama
