= EARN =

EARN or Earn may refer to:

EARN

- European Academic and Research Network, a defunct computer networking organisation succeeded by TERENA (Trans-European Research and Education Networking Association)
- Economic Analysis and Research Network, a nationwide (U.S.) network of state and local organizations affiliated with the Economic Policy Institute
- European Asteroid Research Node, an association of asteroid research groups (see Minor planet)

Earn

- Loch Earn, lake in Scotland
- River Earn, river in Scotland
- Bridge of Earn, town in Perthshire, Scotland
- Earn out, in the purchase of a company etc.
- Carl Earn (1921–2007), American tennis player

== See also ==
- Earning (disambiguation)
