= Build Hearts from Stars =

Build Hearts From Stars

Studio album by Honor Bright
- Released: June 3, 2007; December 1, 2008 (reissue)
- Genre: Pop punk
- Label: Self-released, Aux Records (reissue)

Honor Bright chronology
Get Stoked! (2006)	Build Hearts From Stars (2007)	If This Was a Movie (2008)

Build Hearts From Stars is the debut full-length, but second release, from Syracuse, NY pop-punkers, Honor Bright. It was released on June 3, 2007, but was re-released on Aux Records on December 1 of the following year, due to the initial pressing selling out.

A music video was made for the song "Take My Hand."

== Track listing ==
1. "Bull in a China Shop"
2. "Tapdancer"
3. "Side Effects May Include Heartbreak and Self Loathing
4. "Kid Tested, Mother Approved"
5. "Take My Hand"
6. "Stage Dives and High Fives"
7. "I Gotta See a Thing About a Girl"
8. "This Situation"
9. "You Sure Can't Keep a Secret"
10. "Normal"
11. "I Gave You My Heart, You Gave Me A Pacemaker (acoustic)" (deluxe edition bonus track)
12. "If Only They Knew (acoustic)" (deluxe edition bonus track)
