= Merrit =

Merrit may refer to:

== People ==
- Merrit Cecil Walton (1915-1969), United States Marine platoon sergeant
- E. B. Merrit, pen name of Canadian author Miriam Waddington (1917–2004)
- Milo Merrit (1915–2009), American politician

== Trees ==
- Eucalyptus flocktoniae, a tree commonly known as merrit
- Eucalyptus urna, a tree commonly known as merrit

== See also ==
- Merit (disambiguation)
- Meritt (disambiguation)
- Merritt (disambiguation)
