= Merit (indie rock band) =

US musical group

- Origin: Syracuse, New York, United States
- Genres: Indie rock, alternative rock
- Years active: 2002-present
- Label: Aux
- Members: Hal Appleby : Vocals, guitar Wil Mecum : Bass guitar Brenna Merritt : Vocals, guitar Jeff Nelson : Drums
- Website: gomeritgo.com

Merit is an American indie rock band from Syracuse, New York, United States.

== Band history ==
In 2002, Wil Mecum and Jeff Nelson (attending Syracuse University at the time) joined forces with local singer songwriter Brenna Merritt, and took a variant spelling of her last name for their new band's name. Hal Appleby rounded out the group.

Remaining in Syracuse after graduation, the band plays there regularly, also trekking to New York City to play. Occasional tours have taken the band as far away as Georgia. They've opened for several national acts including Thousand Foot Krutch, Liz Phair, Stage, Bif Naked, The Reputation, and Freya.

Their first demo, recorded in May 2003 found its way to a Syracuse rock station, where it not only received airplay, but also won them an hour-long interview and acoustic performance. The local radio support caught the attention of Aux Records, a newly formed indie label in Central New York. Merit's first full-length album, When We Fight, came out on Aux in April 2004.

Since the album release, Merit has made several more in-studio radio appearances and has received support from stations ranging from Rochester to Albany, NY with their single Man on a String breaking into the top ten on K-Rock in Syracuse. The band was also honored as the recipient of the Brian Bourke Award for Best New Artist at the 2004 Syracuse Area Music Awards.

A subsequent self-titled release featured was planned as an EP but an acoustic session went so well the band doubled the number of songs in order to showcase their softer side. A second full-length album is in the works and is scheduled for release in late 2007.

== Discography ==
- When We Fight (14-song album April 2004, Aux)
- Merit (10-song "double EP"—half electric, half acoustic) (May 2006, Aux)
- Arson Is for Lovers (March 24, 2009) Aux
