= Merritt Island (disambiguation) =

Merritt Island, Florida, is a census-designated place in Brevard County as well as the peninsula where it is located.

Merritt Island may also refer to:

- Merritt Island Airport (IATA airport code: COI, ICAO airport code: KCOI), an airport on the peninsula
- Merritt Island National Wildlife Refuge, on the peninsula in Florida
- Kennedy Space Center (KSC), NASA spaceport on the peninsula in Florida
- Merritt Island High School, Merritt Island, Brevard County, Florida, USA
- Merritt Island AVA, Yolo County, California, USA; an island

== See also ==
- Merritt (disambiguation)
