= Mullen, California =

Mullen
- Former settlement
- Location in California
- Coordinates: 38°39′07″N 121°45′58″W
- Country: United States
- State: California
- County: Yolo
- Elevation: 69 ft (21 m)

Mullen is a former settlement in Yolo County, California, United States. It was located on the Southern Pacific Railroad, 2 miles (3.2 km) south-southeast of Woodland, at an elevation of 69 feet (21 m). A 1913 book described Mullen, along with Merritt, as farming towns along the main automobile route from Davis to Woodland. It still appeared on maps as of 1915.
