= J & L Randall =

British toy manufacturer

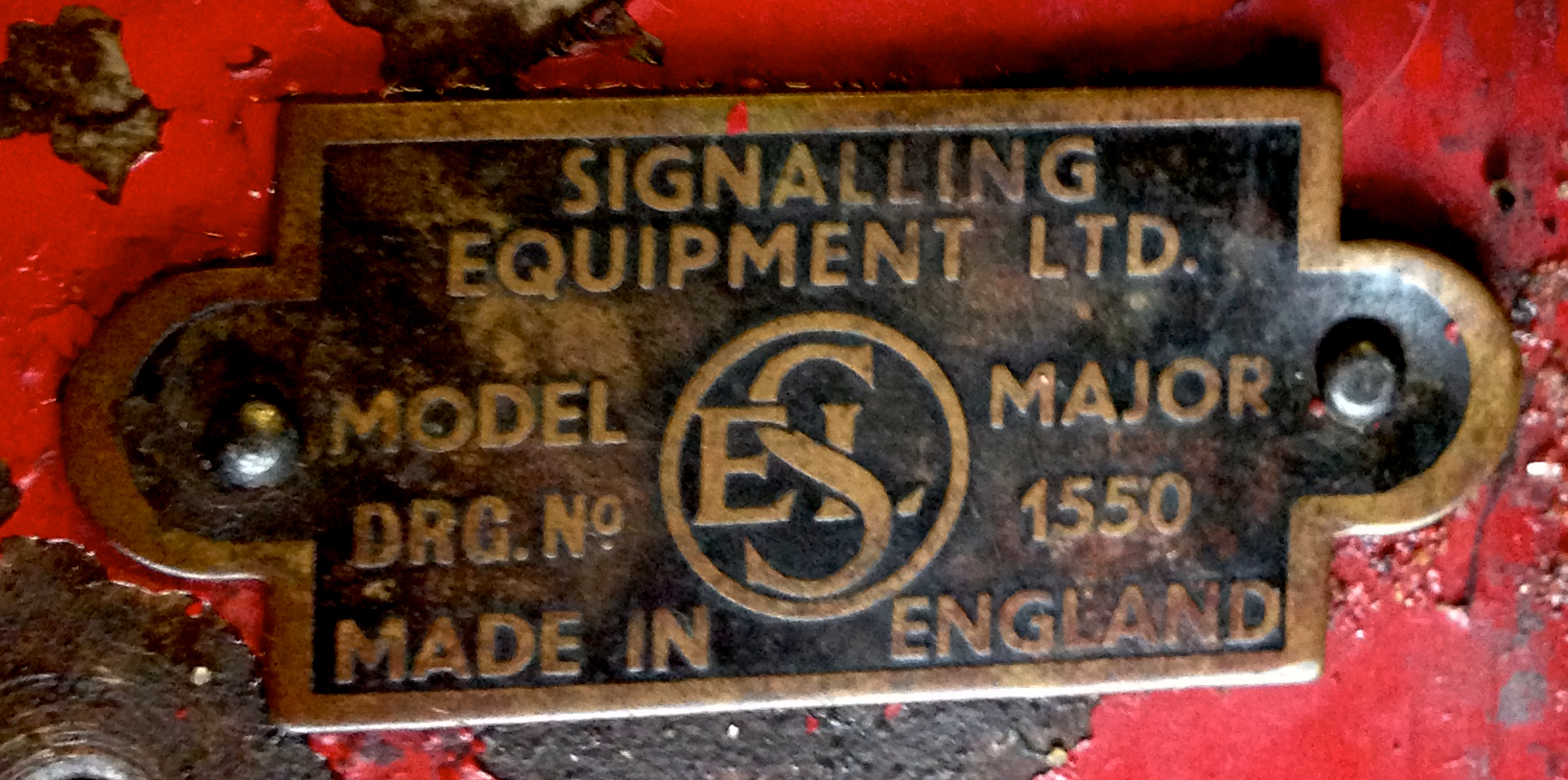
Signalling Equipment Limited logo from a 1550 major engine

J & L Randall Ltd was a British toy manufacturer, based in Potters Bar, which was in Middlesex until 1965 and then in Hertfordshire. The company flourished in the 1950s and 1960s and placed regular advertisements in Meccano Magazine. It was one of the main competitors to Mamod for models of stationary steam engines.

The company used two trading names:

- Merit for general toys
- SEL (Signalling Equipment Ltd) for technical toys, e.g. electric motors, steam engines and student microscopes. It is believed that the term "signalling equipment" originally related to items such as Morse keys and sounders.

In 1978 the company was bought by Letraset for 12.5 million pounds.

The company no longer exists but some of the products, especially the steam engines have become collector's items.

== Products ==
The company made a wide range of toys under both brand names. The catalogue contained hundreds of items at their peak. Nowadays, they are best known for the SEL range, especially the steam engines, dynamotor and student's microscopes.

Signalling Equipment Limited 1550 major static engine begins to run

=== Steam engines ===
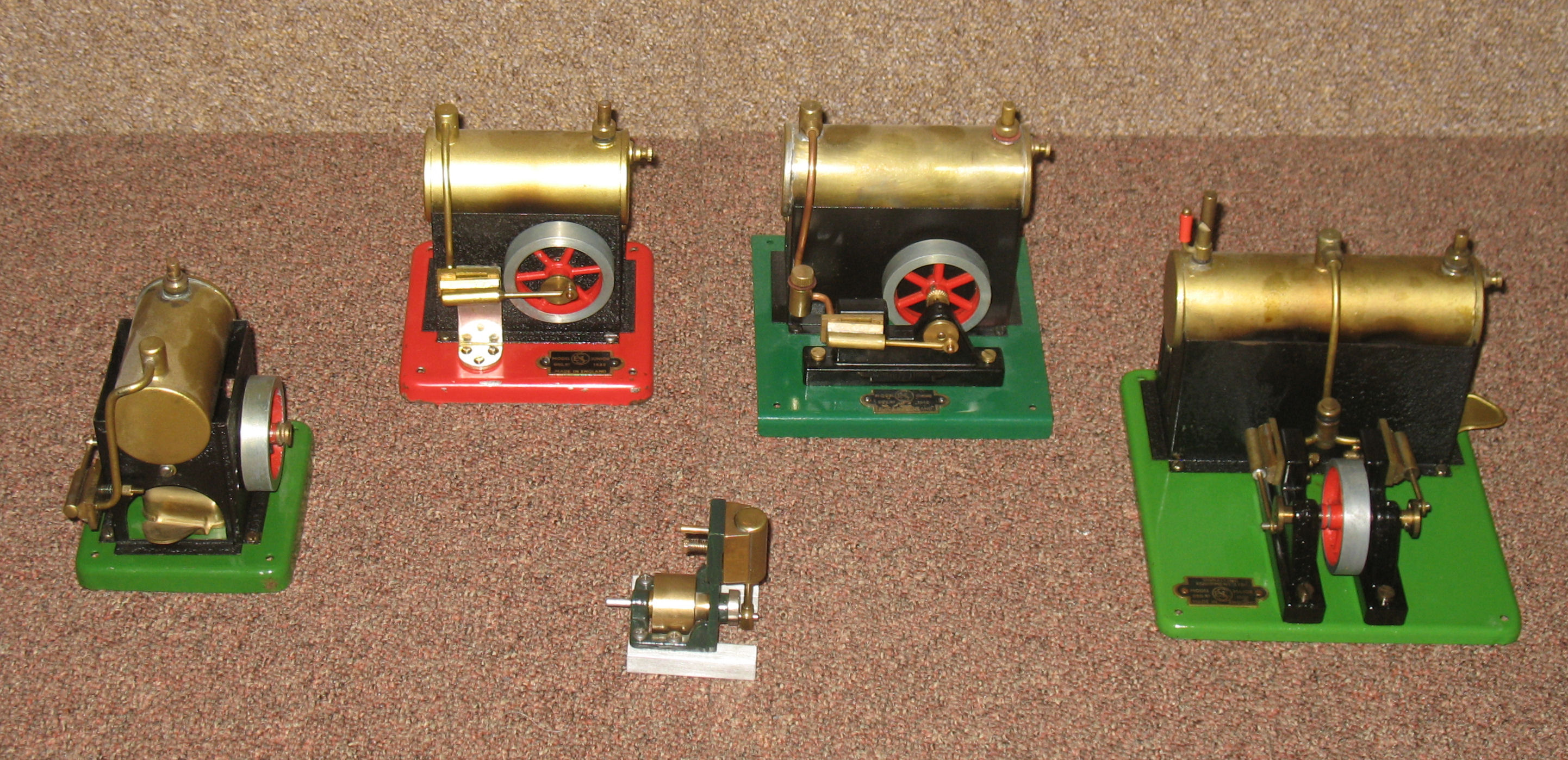
Examples of all 5 of Signalling Equipment Ltd steam engines. Back row L-R - 1520 Minor, 1530 Junior, 1540 Standard, 1550 Major. Front 1560 Boat engine

The steam engine range consisted of four stationary engines, and a steam engine unit for model boats. The stationary engines were the Minor, Junior, Standard and Major. The major could also be bought complete with a set of miniature workshop tools. When the steam engine line was brought to an end in 1965, remaining stocks of the model boat engine were bought up by Mamod and used for their ME3 "marine engine".

=== Dynamotor ===
The SEL "Dynamotor" was a simple two-pole, permanent magnet, machine which could be run as a motor (using 4-6 volts from a dry battery) or used as a dynamo. There were also four low voltage motors described in the catalogue just as motors. Three of these were ac/dc so could not be used as dynamos but the fourth was a dc only permanent magnet type which could have been used as a dynamo. There was also a range of mains voltage ac/dc motors which could not, by any means, be considered toys.

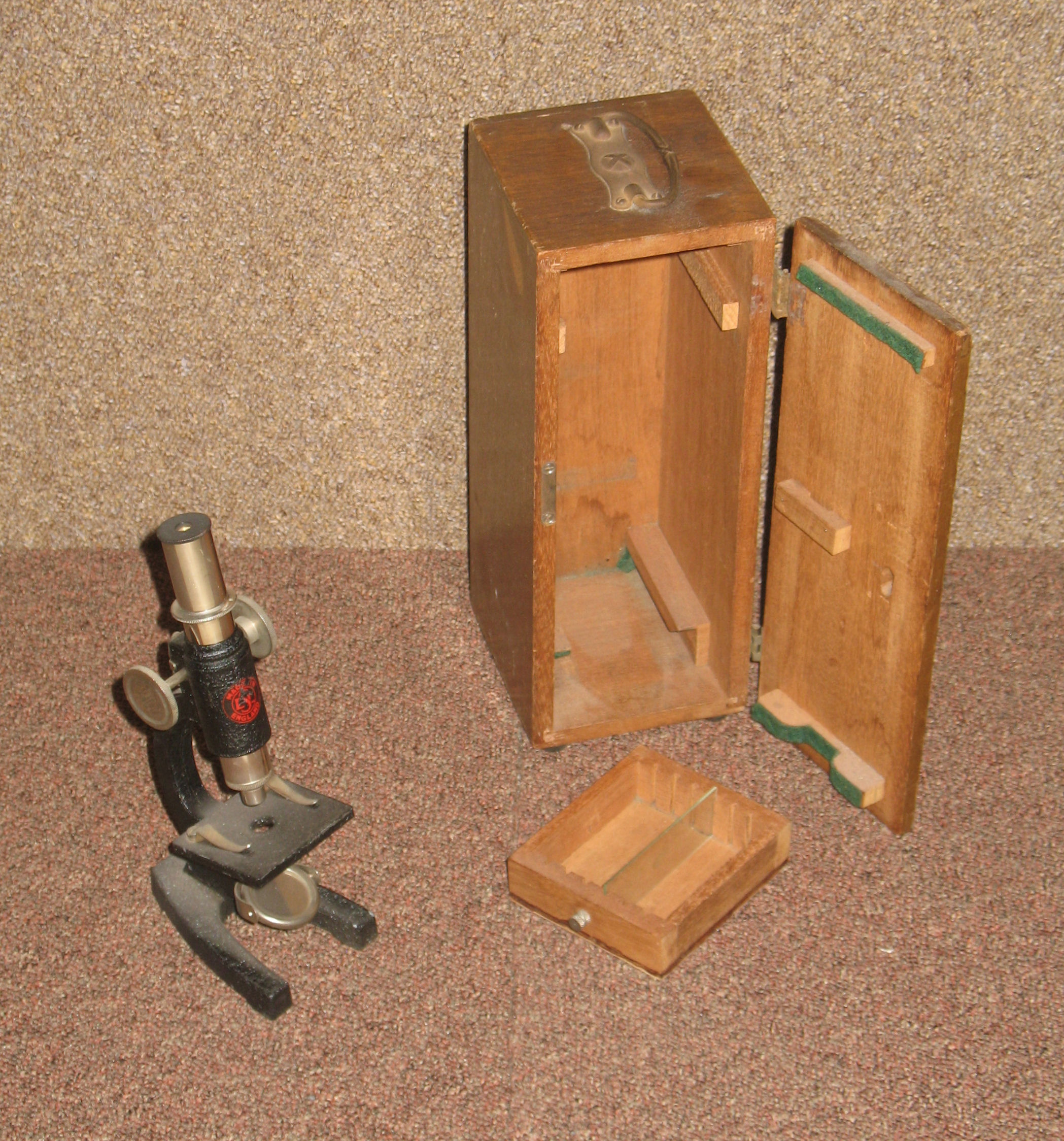
SEL Student's Microscope with wooden box containing a drawer for glass slides. Other accessories are missing.

=== Student's microscopes ===
There were several models of microscope, all similar in design but differing in size. They were simple but well made instruments with sturdy cast alloy frames. They were supplied in a wooden or cardboard box complete with several glass slides, tweezers and instruction leaflet.

=== Chemistry sets ===
"Merit" brand chemistry sets were produced through the 1970s and 1980s.
