= Demerit =

Demerit may refer to:

- Demerit good, in economics
- Demerit point, awarded for driving infractions in some countries
- Demerit (school discipline), a mark in education given for misbehaviour
- Negative merit in Buddhism and Hinduism

== People with the surname ==
- Jay DeMerit, American soccer player
- John DeMerit, American baseball player

== See also ==
- Merit (disambiguation)
