= Merit Cudkowicz =

American neurologist

- Education: Massachusetts Institute of Technology; Harvard Medical School
- Known for: Clinical ALS research
- Awards: 2019 2019 Ray Adams American Neurological Association Award, 2014 Lou Gehrig Humanitarian Award, 2009 American Academy of Neurology Sheila Essay ALS award
- Scientific career
- Fields: Neuroscience, neurology
- Workplaces: Harvard Medical School, Massachusetts General Hospital

Merit Cudkowicz is an American neurologist and neuroscientist who studies amyotrophic lateral sclerosis (ALS). Cudkowicz is Julieanne Dorn Professor of Neurology at Harvard Medical School, director of the ALS clinic and the Neurological Clinical Research Institute at Massachusetts General Hospital (MGH), and chair of the Department of Neurology at MGH. Cudkowicz has led several large-scale collaborations and clinical trials to test novel treatments for ALS and as of 2020, researching ways to detect early biomarkers of ALS to improve diagnosis.

== Early life ==
Cudkowicz was born in Buffalo, New York. Her parents were both immunologists, her father a professor and her mother a research technician. From a young age she knew she wanted to pursue science and ended up studying engineering at the Massachusetts Institute of Technology. She was interested in nuclear engineering at the time, so she majored in chemical engineering.

By the end of her undergraduate studies at MIT, Cudkowicz decided that she wanted to attend medical school instead of pursuing a Ph.D., so she stayed in Boston to take a medical degree at Harvard Medical School. She joined the Health Sciences Technology program at Harvard Medical School and became very passionate about neuroscience as well as providing care for patients in the clinic. During her time at Harvard, she also obtained a master's degree in clinical epidemiology through the Harvard School of Public Health.

After her medical degree, Cudkowicz completed her internship at Beth Israel Hospital in New York City and then returned to Boston to complete her neurology residency and fellowship at MGH. During her residency, Cudkowicz became the chief resident in Neurology at MGH.

== Career ==
During her residency, Cudkowicz decided to pursue clinical research centered around experimental therapeutics. Since the clinical neurology program at MGH at the time was non-existent at the time, Cudkowicz explored collaborations to improve the involvement of academic clinicians in clinical trials for neurotherapeutic innovations. In 1994, she established the Neurology Clinical Trial Unit at MGH. The program has since become the Neurological Clinical Research Institute (NCRI). She is director of the program which organizes patient data for clinical trials for neurological disorders.

Cudkowicz also developed the Northeast ALS Consortium (NEALS) during her residency with a partner Jeremy Shefner in 1995. The goal of NEALS is to perform collaborative and academic led clinical trials for ALS. NEALS began with the involvement of 9 academic clinical centers and has since expanded to almost 100 centers worldwide. Cudkowicz has since remained involved in the leadership of NEALS and is co-director of NEALS Clinical Trials Network.

After her residency training, Cudkowicz became a professor at Harvard Medical School. She is now Julieanne Dorn Professor of Neurology at Harvard Medical School, chief of the Neurology Service at MGH, co-director of the Neuromuscular Division at MGH, and director of the Sean M. Healey & AMG Center for ALS at MGH, which she launched in 2019. Her academic research focuses on ALS, and she develops novel diagnostics and treatments for patients with ALS and organizes large clinical trials to bring new approaches closer to use in the ALS patient population.

As a principal investigator in the NeuroNEXT Clinical Coordinating Center at MGH which is a part of the National Institute of Neurological Disorders and Stroke's Neurology Network of Excellence in Clinical Trials, Cudkowicz is involved in leading the group to expedite therapy development for neurological disorders. Through this initiative, she launched the first ALS treatment discovery pipeline, the HEALEY ALS Platform Trial, which will promote expedited research for ALS.

=== Clinical trials for ALS therapeutics ===
Mutations in the superoxide dismutase 1 (SOD-1) gene were discovered to be linked to the development of ALS. Cudkowicz partnered with Robert Brown, who discovered the link between SOD-1 and ALS, to develop methods to target this gene in patients with ALS. Since gain of function mutations in SOD-1 are associated with ALS development, Cudkowicz and her colleagues explored the potential of silencing this gene product in patients with ALS. They developed SOD-1 antisense oligonucleotides which, when given to rats, extended their survival and reversed the loss of compound muscle action. Cudkowicz and her team began conducting some of the first clinical trials intrathecally administering SOD-1 antisense oligonucleotides into ALS patients with SOD1 mutations.

Cudkowicz has also led clinical trials for the use of ceftriaxone, an excitatory amino acid transporter, to minimize glutamate-mediated over-excitation as a treatment for ALS. Targeting over-excitability in an alternate way, Cudkowicz has been leading a trial to test the effects of Ezogabine, a potassium channel agonist, in phase II clinical trials.

In 2019, Cudkowicz started to test the efficacy of autologous bone marrow-derived mesenchymal stem cells for the treatment of ALS. The results have paved the way for future trials and use of intrathecal autologous bone marrow-derived mesenchymal stem cells administration.

=== Investigating immune and glial cells in ALS ===
To better understand the pathogenesis of ALS, Cudkowicz explored the role of various immune cells and glial cells in disease progress and treatment. She found that infusion of autologous regulatory T cells in patients with ALS slowed the progression of the disease.

Cudkowicz has also explored the role of glial cells in ALS. Using PET imaging with TSPO ligands, Cudkowicz was able to deduce that glial cell activation occurs in regions associated with motor control in patients with ALS. Her findings supported findings that reported activation of glial cells in neural degeneration, and confirmed their presence in brain regions associated with ALS symptoms. Then, using ligand C11-PBR28, Cudkowicz, and her colleagues found further support for activation of glia correlating with severity of Upper Motor Neuron Burden, a scale used in ALS diagnosis.

== Awards and honors ==
- 1998 – Claflin Distinguished Scholar Award
- 2009 – Sheila Essay ALS Award, American Academy of Neurology
- 2014 – Lou Gehrig Humanitarian Award
- 2017 – Forbes Norris Award from the International Alliance of ALS/MND Associations
- 2018 – Achievement in the Professions Pinnacle Award
- 2019 – Ray Adams Award, American Neurological Association
