= Aux Records =

American independent record label

Aux Records is an independent record label from Syracuse, New York. The label was started in 2003 and has released music for several bands that are from Central New York. The most notable record the label released is the Deluxe Edition of Build Hearts From Stars from the band Honor Bright. Honor Bright, a pop-punk band from Syracuse, was selected to play on the Warped Tour in 2008 and played live on MTV's program TRL.

== History ==
Aux has been involved in producing live music events including the Emerging Artists Stage at the Taste of Syracuse and the Emerging Artist Showcase at the New York State Fair.

== Discography ==
AUX001 - Merit - When We Fight (April 2004)
AUX002 - For The Horizon - If All Else Fails (July 2005)
AUX004 - Merit - Merit (May 2006)
AUX005 - The Pilot Lies - Do Things Look Any Better? (May 2006)
AUX006 - Anorexic Beauty Queen - This Little Light (June 2006)
AUX007 - Merit - Sampler 2007 (August 2007)
AUX008 - Caleb Micah - Come Home (September 2007)
AUX009 - Anorexic Beauty Queen presents Michael Watson - Mistakes and All (December 2007)
AUX010 - Dropcard Compilation with Syracuse.com and SubCat Studio, 2008 Taste of Syracuse (June 2008)
AUX011 - Honor Bright - Build Hearts From Stars (Deluxe Edition) (December 2008)
AUX012 - Fazeshift - The Everyday Broken Heart (September 2008)
AUX014 - Merit - Arson Sampler (July 2008)
AUX015 - Aux Records Sampler (July 2008)
AUX016 - Honor Bright BHFS / ITWAM Sampler (July 2008)
AUX017 - The Icon And The Axe - Propaganda (2009)
AUX018 - The Brilliant Light - A Healing Is Due (April 2009)
AUX019 - The Brilliant Light - Things That I Won't Need (February 2011)
AUX020 - The Afro Nips - I Don't Wanna Die! (June 2013) digital
AUX021 - Anorexic Beauty Queen - Demons (June 2013) digital
AUX022 - The Afro Nips / Anorexic Beauty Queen (December 2013) split CD
AUX024 - Safe - Cinematic Ocean (December 2013) vinyl / digital
AUX025 - The Afro Nips - Died At The Right Time (April 2014) digital
AUX026 - Thoughts In Reverse (self-titled) (CD November 2014 / vinyl April 2015)
AUX027 - Honor Bright - Arizona (single) (April 3, 2015)
AUX028 - Honor Bright - Waiting For The End (single) (April 3, 2015)
AUX029 - The Afro Nips - Get High (April 20, 2015)

== Logo ==
The Aux Records logo is based on the periodic table's symbol for gold (Au).

== Ownership ==
The label was started by Ulf Oesterle as a doctoral student attending Syracuse University in 2003. He currently teaches music business classes at the university for The Bandier Program.
