= 16 mm scale =

Model railway scale

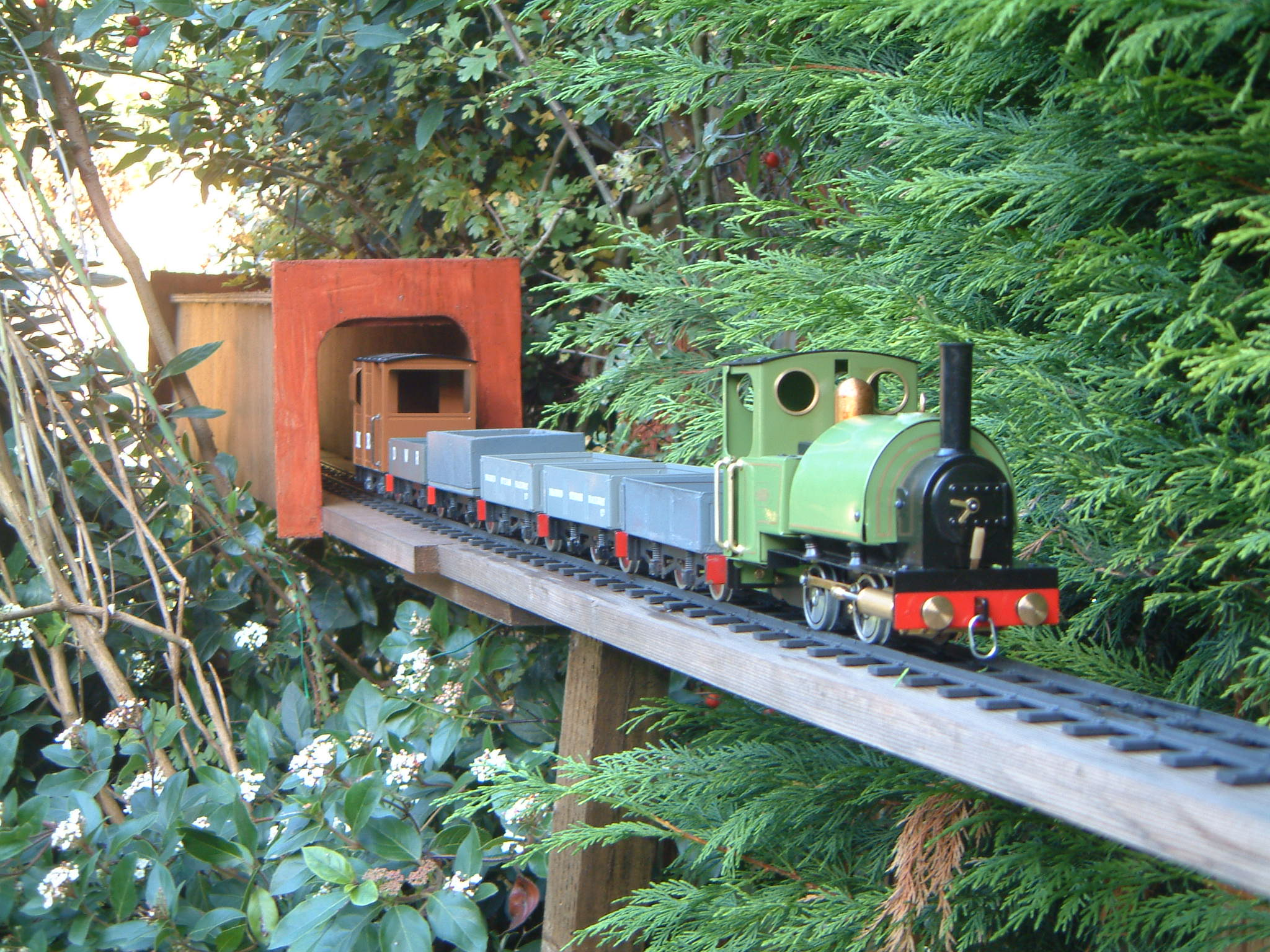
- Modified Mamod live steam locomotive and train on a garden railway layout
- Scale: 16 mm to 1 foot
- Scale ratio: 1:19.05
- Model gauge: 32 mm (1.26 in)
- Prototype gauge: 2 ft (610 mm)

16 mm to 1 foot or 1:19.05 is a popular scale of model railway in the UK which represents narrow gauge prototypes. The most common gauge for such railways is 32 mm (1.26 in), representing 2 ft (610 mm) gauge prototypes. This scale/gauge combination is sometimes referred to as "SM32" (terminology popularised by Peco, one of the principal manufacturers of appropriate track) and is often used for model railways that run in gardens, being large enough to easily accommodate live steam models. The next most common gauge is 45 mm (1.772 in), which represents the theoretical non-existent gauge 2 feet 9 3/4 inches (857 mm). This gauge is commonly used to portray prototypes between 2 ft 6 in (762 mm) and 3 ft (914 mm) gauge.

== Overview ==
There are a number of commercial manufacturers of 16 mm scale models as well as many enthusiastic amateurs who build their own rolling stock. Because real 2 ft (610 mm) railways were most commonly found in the UK, many of the models are of British prototypes. European and North American narrow gauge railways are also modeled in this scale, mainly with scratch-built or kit-built models.

Although models of approximately this scale were being built as early as the 1930s, it was the founding of the Merioneth Railway Society just after the Second World War that marks the popularization of this scale.

This set the light-hearted spirit of the 16 mm fraternity, where a sense of fun and whimsy often override more serious concerns. The use of live steam as the predominant motive power of the models means absolute scale reproduction is often sacrificed to the demands of steam engineering at this scale. However the realistic sound, smell and visual effects of steam-driven locomotives makes up for loss of fidelity elsewhere. Driving a live steam locomotive, even at this small scale is very different from driving an electrically powered model.

For many years there were no commercially available parts, and everything was hand-built or kit-bashed from O scale components. In the 1968 Archangel emerged as the first commercial manufacturer on a large scale, followed by Merlin and Beck at the end of 1970s. All three companies produced affordable live steam locomotives in this scale. In 1981, Mamod entered the market with a cheap if somewhat crude steam loco for the UK market. Although not perfect, the low cost opened the hobby to a much wider range of people and as a result demand for other products grew. Roundhouse enjoys a large share of the market as builders of high quality live steam locomotives and suppliers of parts for home builders. A group of professional and hobbyist makers have emerged to meet this demand. Accucraft UK have built high quality live steam models of locomotives of the Talyllyn Railway, the Lynton & Barnstaple, and Welshpool & Llanfair.

== Manufacturers ==
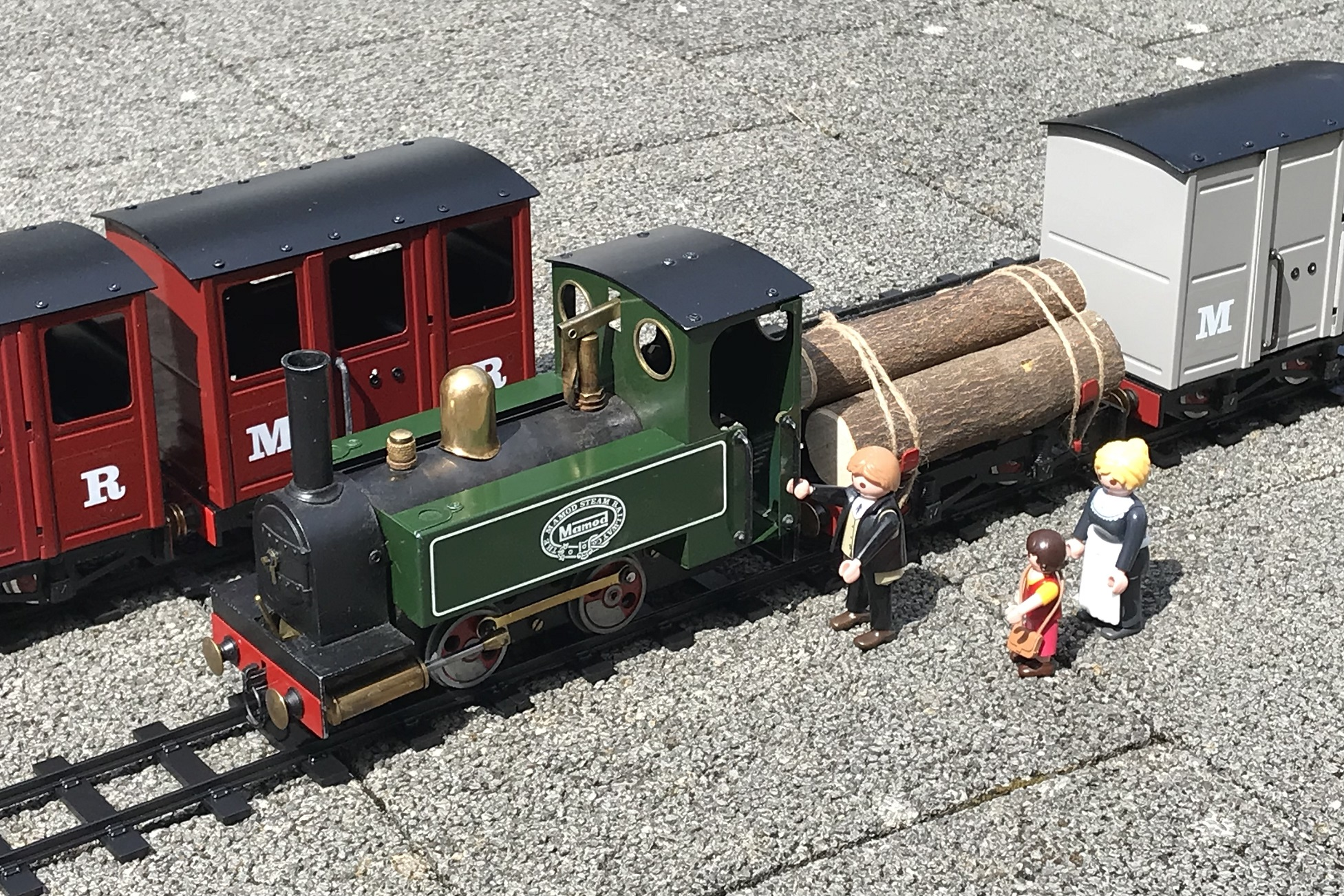
Mamod 16 mm gauge live steam railway.

The Useful Links page in the 16mm Association web site has an extensive list of active traders. The list below includes traders who were significant in the hobby at one stage but are no longer active.

- Accucraft UK
- Archangel
- Argyle
- Brandbright
- Bole Laser Craft
- Bowaters Models
- Busy Bodies (no longer trading)
- Cooper Craft
- DJB Engineering
- IP Engineering
- John Prescott Engineering (no longer trading)
- Locomotion
- Mamod
- Merlin Locomotive Works (no longer trading)
- Mike Beeson Models (no longer trading)
- MSS (Mamod Sales and Services, Model Steam Specialists)
- PDF Models
- P.S Models
- Pearse Locos (no longer trading)
- Perfect World (no longer trading)
- PPS Steam Models
- Roundhouse Engineering
- RWM Steam (no longer trading - Evans Steam Services incorporate RWM)
- Slaters
- Swift Sixteen
- T&S Models
- Tenmille
- Timpdon Models
- Trenarren Models
- WellChuffed
- Worsley Works

== See also ==
- Rail transport modelling scales
- List of rail transport modelling scale standards
- 1 gauge
- 2 gauge
- G scale
