= Mamod =

Maker of steam powered toys and models

Mamod (Malins Engineers)
- Type: Private
- Industry: Toys
- Founded: 1937
- Founder: Geoffrey H Malins
- Defunct: 2024
- Headquarters: Smethwick, Warley (Since 1992), UK
- Area served: Worldwide
- Products: Toy steam engines
- Website: mamod.co.uk

Mamod was a toy manufacturer that was based in Britain that specialized in producing live steam models until closure in 2024. The company was founded in Birmingham in 1937 by Geoffrey Malins. The name "Mamod" is a combination of "Malins Models." Initially, the company manufactured stationary steam engines, which were originally sold under the 'Hobbies' brand. Subsequently, Malins introduced the brand name 'Mamod.' Invariably always pronounced wrongly, the correct pronunciation of the name is "May-mod" - MAlins-MODels in short.

Over time, Mamod expanded its range to include models of road rollers, traction engines, steam wagons, steam locomotives and other steam-powered road vehicles. These models were primarily intended for the toy market and were designed to be user-friendly and operate at low boiler pressures for safety, although they were not precise scale models.

== SC, SE and Minor series stationary engines (1937–39) ==
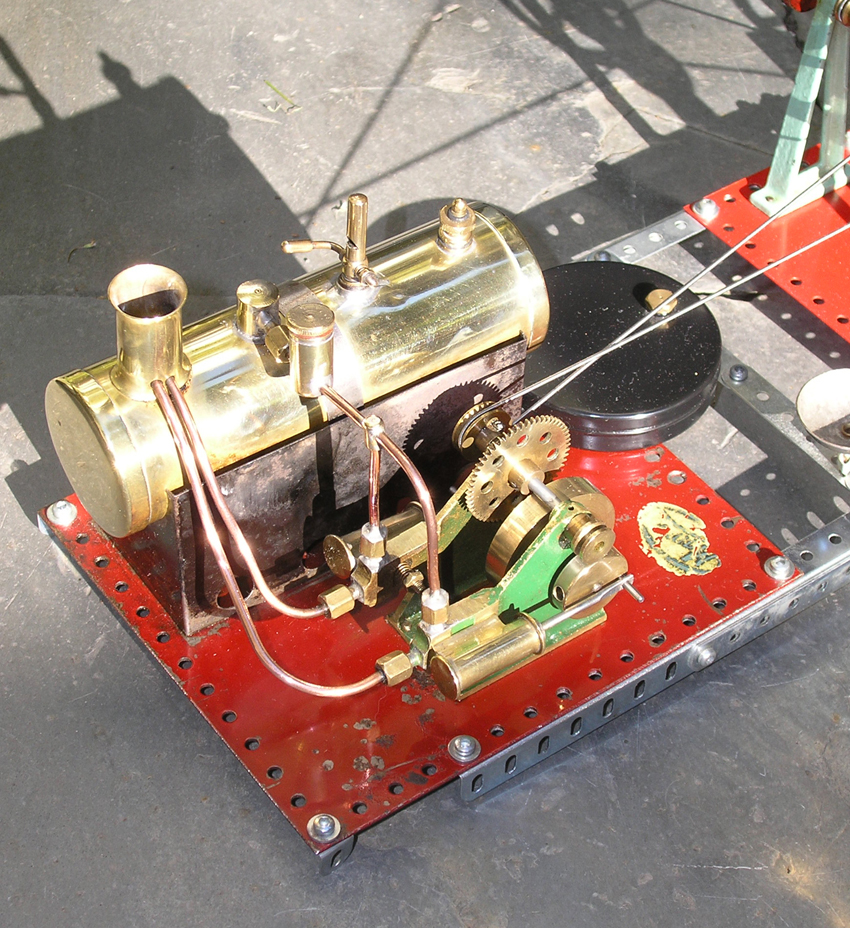
A Mamod SE4 flatbed twin from c1937, shown in the 'Hobbies' colours of darker green and red.

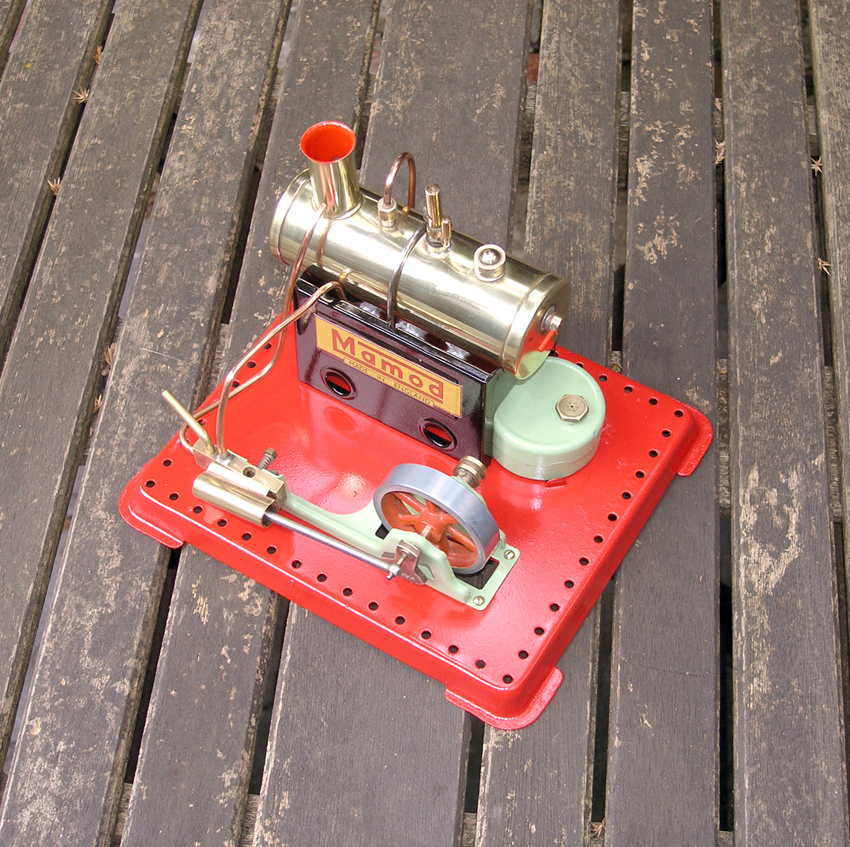
A Mamod SE2 engine from c1958, showing transitional form – new 1958 wide firebox complete with 3-wick burner.

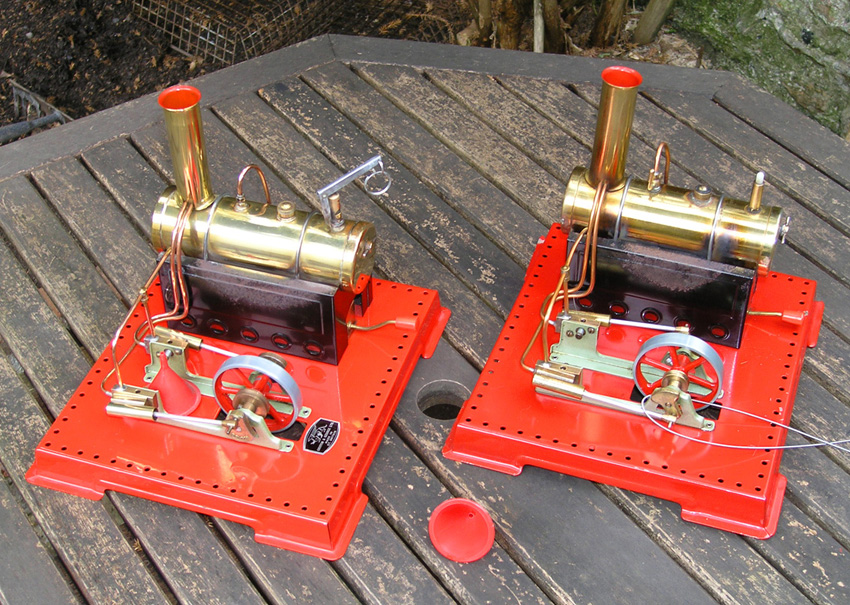
Two Mamod SE3 twin-cylinder steam engines from 1969. The engine on the left is the Griffin & George version, and the version on the right displays push button whistle and screw-on crank webs.

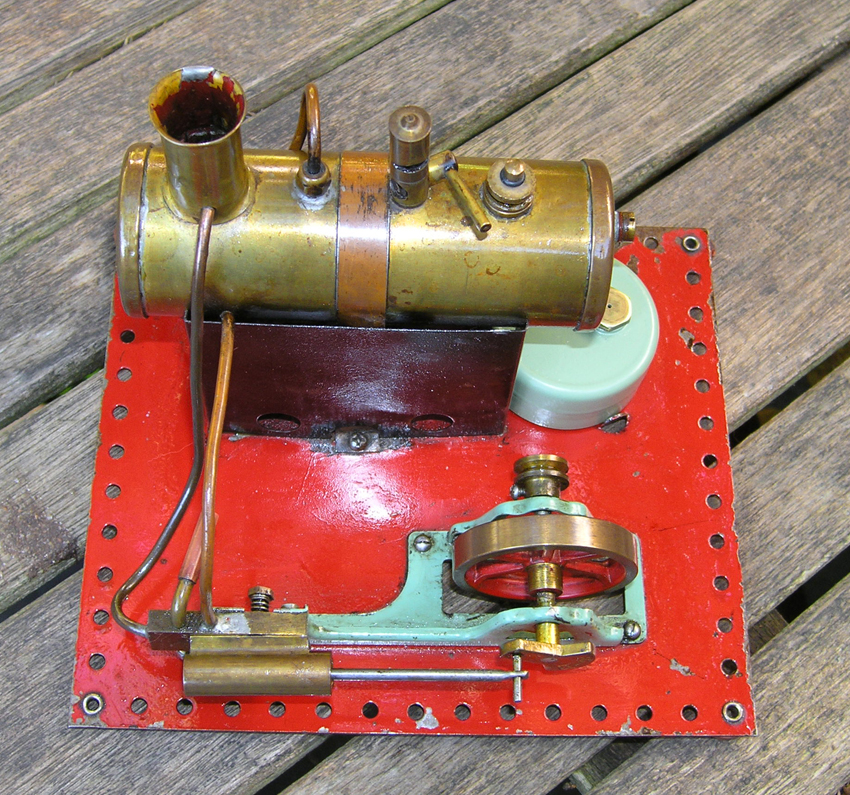
A 1949 Mamod SE2 engine showing new pressed steel engine frame and superheated boiler.

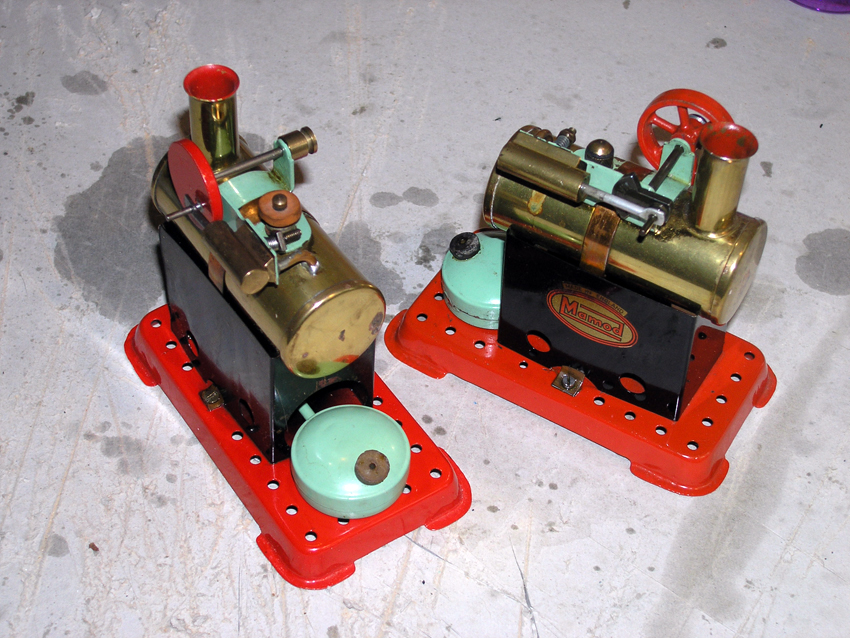
Mamod Minor engines from 1949 and 1954. The red disc-crank version is the earlier engine, whilst the 54 version clearly shows the red 'unclipped' mazak flywheel.

The SE range of engines traces its origins back to 1936, when Geoffrey Malins began manufacturing engines for Hobbies of Dereham. These engines were loosely based on the Bowman engines previously produced by Geoffrey Bowman Jenkins for Hobbies up until 1935. The main distinction between the Bowman and Malins engines was that the latter were smaller, came only on metal bases, and had the chimney attached to the top of the boiler in a locomotive style. Starting in 1937, Malins decided to create his own line of engines in addition to those made for Hobbies. With a few minor differences, such as lighter paint shades and a Mamod badge, the engines were almost identical to the Hobbies range. Over time, the differences between Mamod and Hobbies became less noticeable, and a Mamod-badged SE4 engine could be found in the 'Hobbies colours.' This marked the beginning of a philosophy that aimed to sell engines promptly and minimize waste. By 1940, any remaining distinctions between the two ranges had practically disappeared.

With the outbreak of the Second World War, Malins severed his ties with Hobbies, and the SC series of engines became the last steam toys sold under the Hobbies brand. Malins realised that focusing on his own engines would be more profitable. As the war intensified, the St. Mary Row factory was put on hold, and wartime interests took precedence, although Malins continued producing a limited number of engines throughout the conflict.

After the war, the business was revitalized, and by 1946, a limited range of steam toys, including the SE1, SE2, Minor 1, and tools, were being manufactured. The pre-war SE3 and SE4 models were discontinued, along with the short-lived twin-cylinder Minor 2. The post-war engines, except for the Minor 1 (MM1), featured base-mounted chimneys. However, in the following years, the design reverted to the locomotive-style chimney, resembling the pre-war models. Apart from these changes, the pre-war and post-war models remained largely identical. The SE1 and SE2 were produced in their new form for several months, but due to challenges in acquiring production materials during post-war rationing, the SE1 and SE2 switched back to the locomotive-style chimney. The MM1 engine remained almost unchanged. Until 1948, the models still utilized flat bases and cast iron bodies.

By 1948, the SE range underwent an update, incorporating brass engine frames branded with the Mamod logo and hot-stamped brass flywheels. The SE1 and SE2 models also received regulators. Additionally, a new model called the Minor 2 (MM2) was introduced, featuring a single-cylinder engine unit and serving as a larger version of the MM1. Wick burners with 1, 2, or 3 wick tubes were used in all engines. In 1949, with the company's relocation to Camden Street, the expensive brass engine frames were replaced with pressed steel ones as a cost-saving measure. The design resembled that of some Marklin engines. The SE1 and SE2 models now feature superheating in their boilers. The SE2 retained its regulator, while the SE1 had it removed. The MM1 engine became the first in the range to have a raised, pressed base. This configuration remained unchanged until 1953, when cheaper Mazak material was gradually introduced, leading to the replacement of brass flywheels. The company's approach emphasized continuous product development to maintain competitive prices. During the immediate post-war period, several other manufacturers, such as Plane Products, Cyldon, SEL, Luton Bowman, and Burnac, were also producing steam toys.

At the beginning of 1954, the SE range received raised bases and underwent cosmetic updates and changes. By 1958, all models except the MM1 were equipped with new vaporizing spirit burners, introduced in 1957 along with the twin-cylinder SE3. Additional cosmetic changes included updated boiler bands and fireboxes. Engines produced during the late 1950s period featured combinations of old and new parts, commonly referred to as 'transitional' engines. By the mid-1960s, pop rivets were used for securing the engine frames, along with other aesthetic alterations, across the entire Mamod range. In 1967, the SE range underwent another update, resulting in the introduction of the SE1a and SE2a models, which replaced the SE1 and SE2, respectively. The superheating feature was removed, and simplified pipework was implemented. The SE2a also received a reversing lever, similar to the 'MEC1' Meccano engine introduced in 1965. Gradual changes were made to the paint colour, boiler end cap, whistle design, and decal layout.

From 1967 to 1972, the Se1, Se2, and Se3 models occasionally had different green paint finishes on their engine frames. This paint, resembling a hammered effect, was likely obtained as a cost-saving measure by the managing director at the time, Eric Malins. Steve Malins confirmed that this was the case as the company sought to reduce production costs. However, the Minor range did not receive this paint finish. The SE3 remained unchanged, except for the introduction of a Griffin and George (educational suppliers) version in 1969. This engine stood out as a notable variation among Mamod's largest post-war stationary engines. It featured a silver-soldered boiler (at the insistence of G&G) and had a steam pipe union nut at the boiler instead of the usual stopcock. It also sported an additional foil G&G lozenge logo by the engine. Approximately 2,000 of these engines were produced until the mid-1970s, exclusively sold to schools and accompanied by a manual for use in laboratory experiments. Later examples of this engine were standard SE3 models, but with a revised G&G logo design. In some cases, the Griffin badge could be found alongside the warning labels applied to all stationary engines in 1976, explaining the use of inappropriate fuel containers and refueling techniques.

The 1970s marked the peak of Malins Engineers. In 1970, the MM1 received a vaporizing burner, and in 1975, both Minors were fitted with overflow plugs. In 1977, the engines were converted to solid fuel for the domestic market (a change that had already been implemented for export models). In 1978, the entire range, except for the MM1, had sight glasses installed on the boiler in place of the overflow plug. Towards the end of the 1970s, the SE range was considered outdated, leading to its replacement by the SP range in 1979.

The SP models were modernized versions of the earlier SE models, incorporating changes for safety as well as cosmetic purposes. There is no strict correspondence between models in the SE and SP ranges. A comparison between the two ranges can be seen in the following table:

Pre-war	Post-war	SP era	Comment
Minor 1 1939–40	Minor 1 1946–79	SP1 1979–85	
Minor 2 1939–40			2 cyl
	Minor 2 1948–79	SP2 1979-2024	1 cyl
SE1 1936–37	SE1 1946–67; SE1A 1967–79		
	Meccano 1965–76	SP3 1979–85	
SE2 1936–37; SC2 1939–40	SE2 1946–67; SE2A 1967–79	SP4 1979–2024 (inc SP4D)	
SE3 1936–37; SC3 1939–40			1 cyl
SE4 1936–37; SC4 1939–40	SE3 1957–79 (inc G&G version)	SP5 MK1 79 to 85 Mk2 2001–2024	2 cyl
		SP6	slide valve
		SP7	twin cylinder slide valve
		SP8	beam engine
ME1 1936–40 (Hobbies and Mamod)	ME1 1958–85 (Mamod only)		
	ME2 1958–65; ME3 1965–72		

== Meccano engine ==
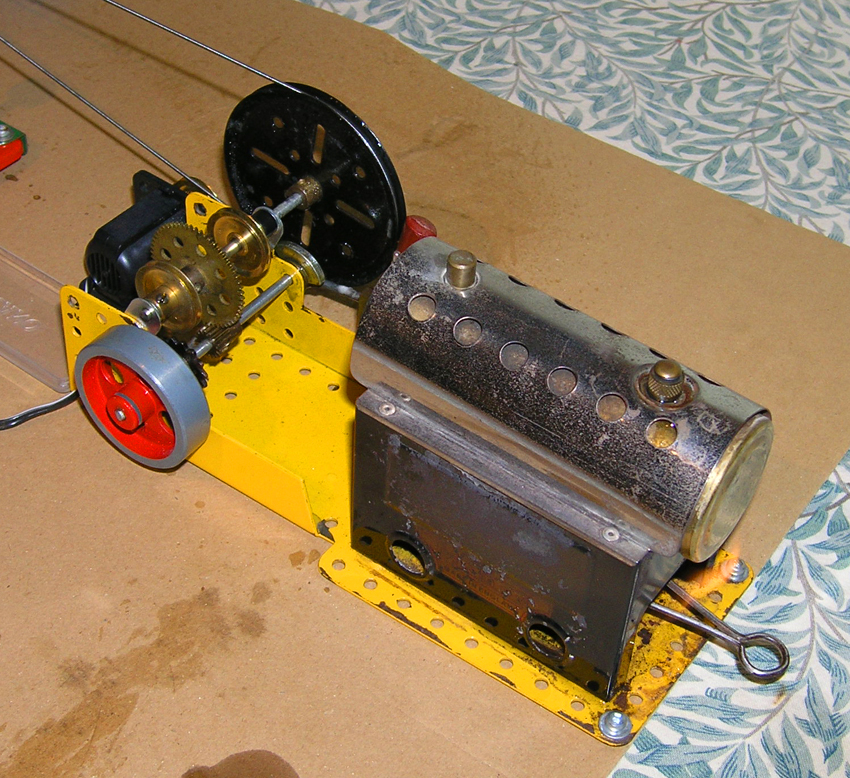
A Malins designed and built MEC1 dating from about 1970.

From 1965 to 1976, Malins manufactured a steam engine according to the specifications of the Meccano company under the Meccano label. It featured a specialized base designed to facilitate integration into Meccano models and included a mechanism that enabled the cylinder to shift in relation to the inlet and exhaust, enabling reverse operation.

Following the discontinuation of the Meccano-branded version, the same engine, with minor adjustments, was later released under the Mamod brand as the SP3 model. Although the original Meccano-branded version did not have an official name or model number, it is commonly referred to as the MEC1.

== The SP Range 1979–to 2024 ==
=== SP1 ===
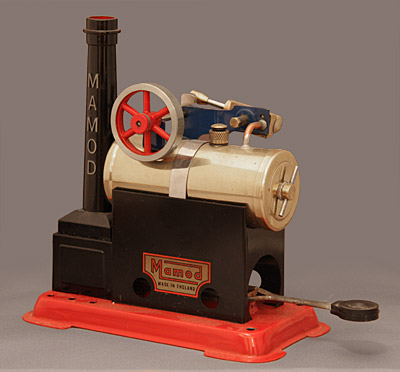
A Mamod SP1 stationary engine circa 1979

The SP1 model was developed based on the Mamod Minor 1, which had been in production since 1939 and was replaced by the SP1. It shared similarities with the Minor 1 in terms of the boiler, engine unit, and flywheel, particularly those without crank discs. However, notable differences included a new black die-cast chimney and a narrow solid fuel burner designed to accommodate a broken tablet. Unlike other SP engines, the SP1 featured a water plug instead of the standard Mamod water sight glass due to the smaller size of its boiler. The firebox remained unchanged from the older Minor 1, and some SP1 engines were built with the old Mamod Minor 1 boiler. The exhaust system was a simple open port, similar to the Minor 2 and MEC1 engines. Despite their limited power and torque, these engines were capable of operating at least one or two miniature tools. The production of the SP1 was discontinued in 1985 after a total of 27,500 units had been manufactured.

Introduced	Replacing	Discontinued	Number Produced
1979	MM1	1985	27,500

=== SP2 and SP2D ===
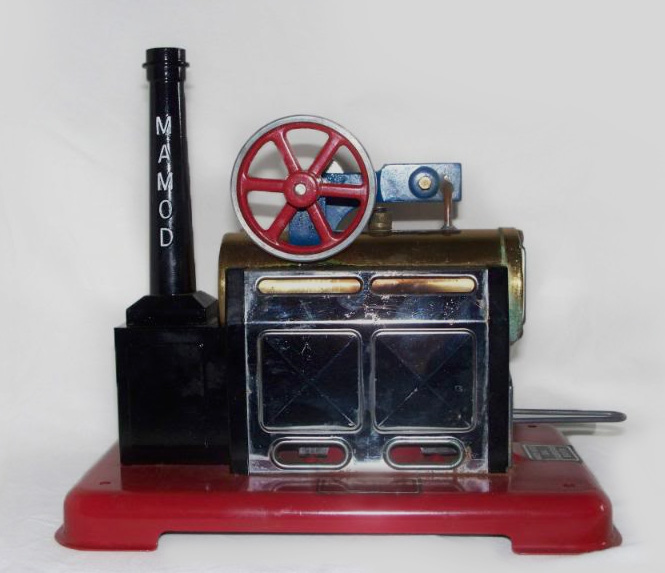
A Mamod SP2 stationary engine

The SP2, which debuted in 1979, was a newly designed model that served as a replacement for the Mamod Minor 2. It shared several similarities with the Minor 2, including the same type of boiler, engine unit, and frame. The exhaust system featured a simple open port, similar to that of the Minor 2. Additionally, there was a variant known as the SP2D, equipped with an integrated dynamo. The SP2D boasted a larger-diameter flywheel that powered the dynamo, positioned inside the base of the chimney, via a belt. At the top of the chimney, a small LED bulb was installed. These engines were remarkably powerful for their size and capable of effortlessly driving a complete workshop comprising four tools.

As of 1995, the production of SP2 models was ongoing, with a total of 36,878 units manufactured.

Introduced	Replacing	Discontinued	Number Produced
1979	MM2	-	36,878 (to 1995) Still in production

Notable variations:

- Early engine frames were initially painted blue but were later changed to black during the 1980s.
- Some sight glasses were secured by screws instead of pop rivets.
- The sight glass cover could be made of silver metal or brass.

=== SP3 ===
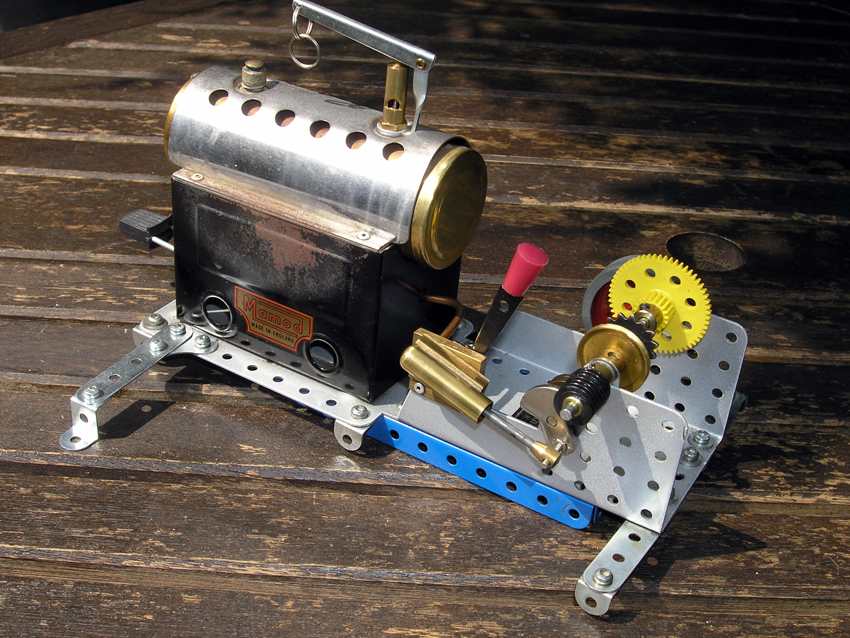
A Mamod SP3 from circa 1980 showing extra gears on a counter shaft and additional Meccano 'outriggers'.

The SP3 model was primarily based on the MEC1 Meccano engine, which was initially introduced in 1965. In essence, the SP3 shared many similarities with the MEC1, with a few notable differences. These included the presence of a solid fuel burner, a sight glass, a whistle in place of the steam dome, and plastic gears instead of metal ones on the crankshaft, specifically designed for operating Meccano models. Similar to the MEC1, the exhaust system featured a simple open port integrated into the engine frame. The engine exhibited dual makers' marks, with both a Mamod and a Meccano-style scalloped edge decal. The baseplate was painted silver, and the boiler utilized a standard Mamod drawn-type tube, also found in the SP2, SP4, and SR1a models. The SP3 possessed ample power to drive an entire range of workshop tools.

Introduced	Replacing	Discontinued	Number Produced
1979	Mec1	1985	9,067

Notable variations:

- Reverser handles were available in either red or black.
- The crank web was typically painted black, although some examples had a bare metal finish.
- Some sight glasses were secured using screws instead of pop rivets.
- Certain versions featured silver metal sight glass covers instead of brass.

=== SP4 and SP4D ===
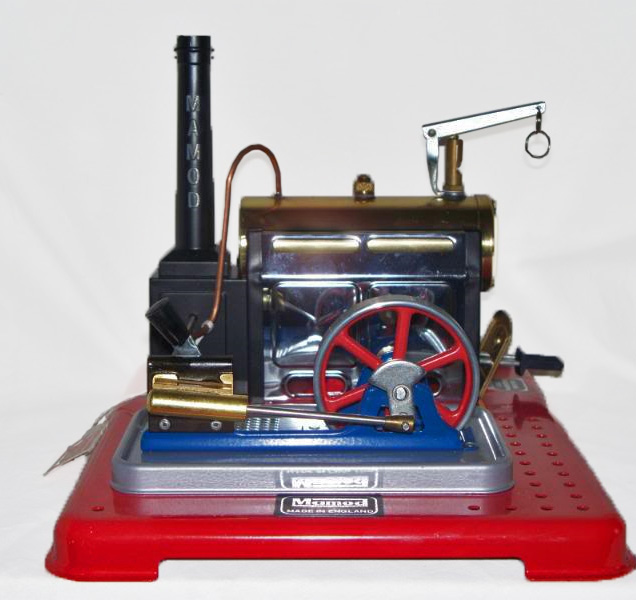
A Mamod SP4 stationary engine

The SP4 engine occupied the middle position within the SP series. It incorporated a standard Mamod-drawn boiler and a die-cast chimney. The engine frame was mounted on a silver plinth, and a reverser mechanism enabled the engine to operate in both forward and reverse directions. With the capacity to drive multiple tools simultaneously through a lineshaft, the SP4 engine boasted an "exhaust to chimney" feature. Similar to the SP2 and SP3 models, the boiler was heated using a two-tablet burner tray, and a whistle was included as well. In the case of the SP4D variant, it utilized a uni-directional engine unit and featured a larger pulley specifically designed to drive a dynamo connected to a small 3V lamp.

Introduced	Replacing	Discontinued	Number Produced
1979	SE2a	-	41,191 (to 1995) Still in production

Notable variations:

- Some sight glasses were secured using screws instead of the typical two pop rivets.
- Sight covers could be either silver metal or brass in some instances.
- The SP4D version was equipped with a dynamo and an additional extra-large pulley (on the same shaft) utilizing a standard flywheel. It did not possess a reverse control lever.

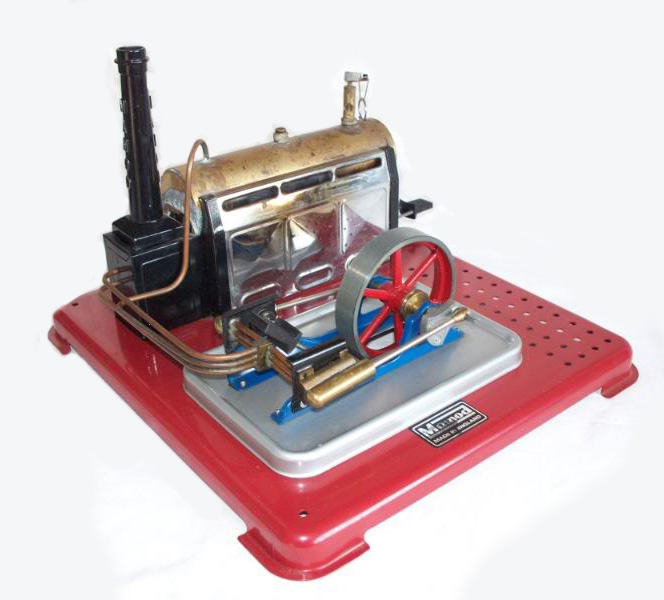
A Mamod SP5 stationary engine

=== SP5 Mk1 and Mk2 ===
The SP5 engine, upon its introduction, held the position of the highest-tier model. It featured a longer boiler measuring 6 inches by 2 inches (152 mm by 51 mm) and a twin-cylinder engine unit equipped with a reverse control. With their larger boilers and twin cylinders, these engines were capable of easily powering multiple workshops. Similar to the SP4, the SP5 engine had an "exhaust to chimney" design with a condensate collector situated at the base of the chimney. The engine unit, like the SP4, was mounted on a plinth, possibly reminiscent of the 1946 SE4 prototype. The crank webs were stamped with the word "Mamod," resembling the old SE3 model it replaced. The boiler was heated using a 3-tablet burner pan, and a whistle was included as part of the specification.

In the case of the newer SP5 model, the Mk2 1335, which has been in production since 2000, several differences can be observed compared to the Mk1 version. The overall layout of the engine has been reversed, with components such as the cylinders and chimney now positioned on the left-hand side. Additionally, the right-hand end of the crankshaft on the SP5 Mk2 features a more efficient and visually appealing crank disc for improved balance and smoother operation. Furthermore, the Mk2 model incorporates one-piece cylinders with a bore of 8 mm (5/16 in) and a stroke of 19 mm (3/4 in). The SP5D Mk2 variant includes a belt-driven dynamo and bulb holder, although a dynamo-less version is also available.

Introduced	Replacing	Discontinued	Number Produced
1979	SE3	1985. A new version, the SP5 Mk2 1335, was introduced in 2000.	10,461 (SP5 Mk1)

Minor variations:

- Some sight glasses were secured using screws instead of the typical pop rivets.
- Sight covers could be either silver- or brass-coloured metal.

A version of the engine was sold to Griffin and George for distribution to educational organizations with an extra G&G decal. There is also a badged SP4 version available. This particular variant was not silver-soldered.

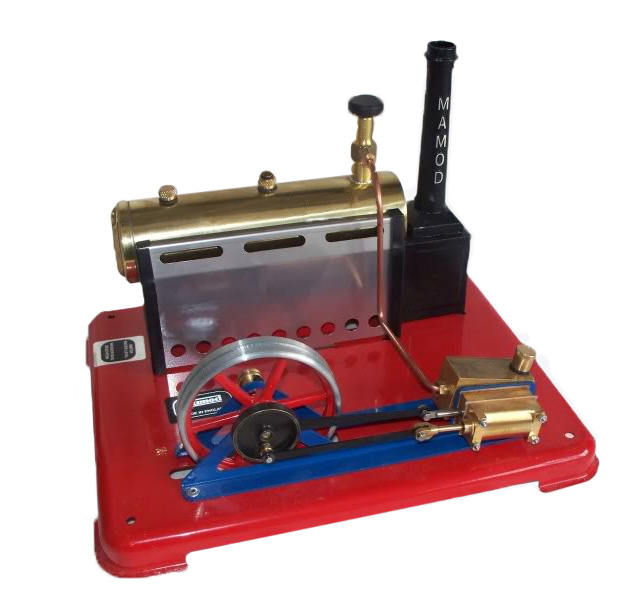
A Mamod SP6 1338 stationary engine

=== SP6 ===
The SP6 1338 is a single-cylinder engine produced by Mamod and is recognized as one of their most powerful engines. It is equipped with a piston valve and a fixed cylinder, distinguishing it from engines with oscillating cylinders. The SP6 1338 utilizes the same boiler and burner unit as the SP5 Mk2 1335, with the option of being fitted with a pressure gauge. The engine block used in this model is also employed in larger mobile models. Initially introduced in 2006, production of the SP6 1338 model is ongoing.

Minor variation:

Around 2006, a limited-edition version of this engine was manufactured for Forest Classics, featuring a green baseplate.

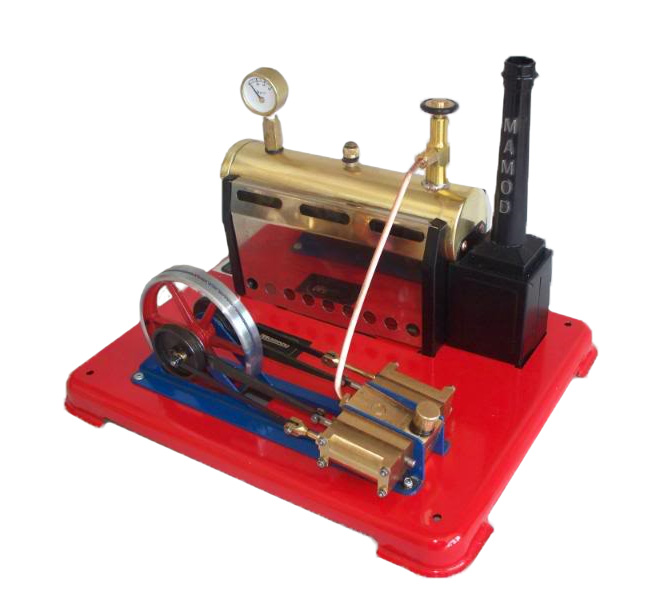
A Mamod SP7 stationary engine

=== SP7 ===
The SP7 is a twin-cylinder engine manufactured by Mamod and is recognized as their most powerful engine. It is similar to the SP6 model in the product range but features twin cylinders. The SP7 utilizes the same boiler and burner unit as the SP6, which can be equipped with a pressure gauge. It was introduced in 2009 and initially made available through special orders. However, production of the SP7 ceased in 2018.

=== SP8 ===
The SP8 is a beam engine manufactured by Mamod and represents their initial venture into this type of engine. It was introduced in 2013 and incorporates a double-acting piston valve cylinder, similar to other recent models. The cylinder is positioned vertically under one end of the beam, which is connected to it through a simulated Watts linkage. The crankshaft and flywheel are located under the opposite end of the beam, while the valve gear is operated by a secondary, smaller beam. The SP8 is available with the choice of a gas or solid fuel burner, although it is no longer in production.

== Mamod miniature tools and line shaft details ==
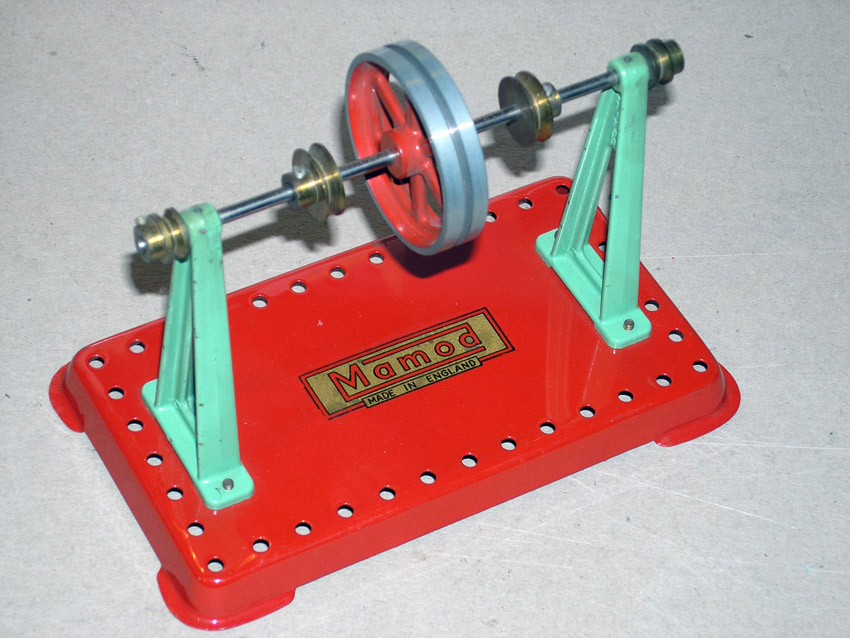
A raised base Mamod line shaft with large rectangular decal, c1958-65.

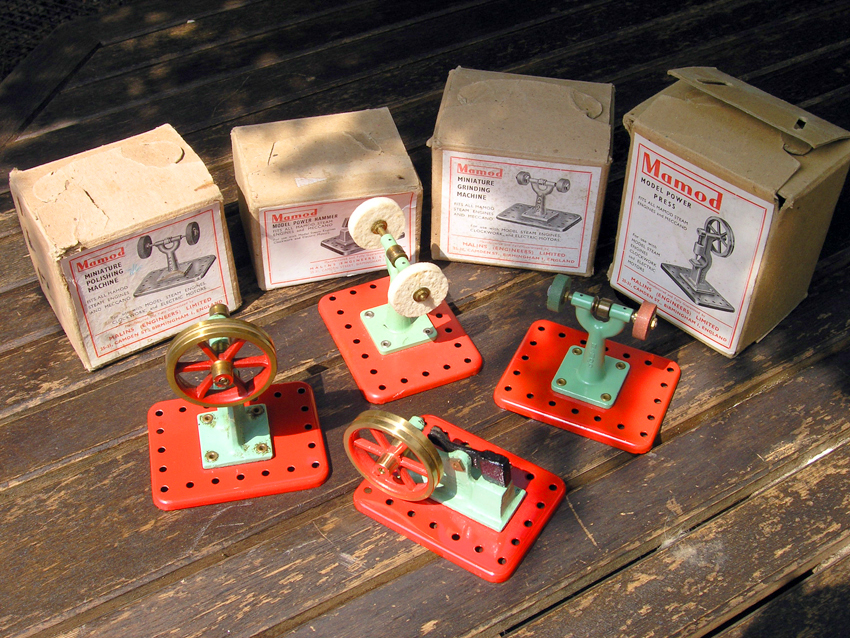
Mamod workshop tools from c1950, showing brass wheeled hammer and punch as well as polisher and grinder.

The company manufactured a variety of model workshop equipment with bodies and bases made of either cast iron or diecast metal. These tools were designed to be compatible with Meccano, featuring a spacing of ½ inches (12.7 mm). The range included:

- The Model Power Press (later renamed the Power Punch)
- Model Power Hammer, which functioned as a trip hammer
- Miniature Polishing Machine, equipped with two 1.25-inch (32 mm) felt polishing wheels
- Miniature Grinding Machine, featuring one fine and one medium 0.75-inch (19 mm) grinding wheels
- Miniature Line Shaft, allowing multiple models to operate simultaneously with three Meccano-compatible pulleys

These tools have been part of Mamod's line of steam toys since the company's establishment in 1937. The early tools had simple flat bases with Meccano-spaced holes and pulleys resembling Meccano components, consisting of roughly made sandcast iron bodies. After World War II, from 1948 onwards, the tools, along with the SE1, SE2, and MM2 engines, were fitted with new hot-stamped brass flywheels. Around the same time, when Malins Engineers moved to Camden Street, Birmingham, power presses were acquired, leading to the introduction of raised bases for the brass-wheeled tools and the polisher/grinder. The cast-iron bodies were later replaced by Mazak around 1950. The MM1 engine became the first steam toy in the Malins' range to feature a raised baseplate thanks to the pressing facilities. The tools underwent minimal changes over the years, except for the switch from brass to Mazak flywheels in 1953 and the disappearance of oiling points by the 1960s. By 1979, the tools had adopted a blue and red colour scheme, aligning with the new SP series of engines and replacing the previous green and red scheme used on all engines and tools until then. Due to financial circumstances, the individual tools were no longer offered as separate items in the mid-1980s (along with the SP1, SP3, and SP5 engines). However, they were reintroduced together in the WS1 workshop introduced in 1979. Subsequently, in the early 2000s, the individual tools made a reappearance.

=== The Mamod lineshaft history ===
The line shaft is an accessory that enables a steam engine to operate multiple tools simultaneously. Its origins can be traced back to 1936, when Geoffrey Malins undertook the task of producing a set of engines for Hobbies of Dereham, following Geoffrey Bowman-Jenkins' departure from Bowman models. The early line shafts had flat bases and were available in two models before the war: the C1 with 4 pulleys and the C2 with 7 pulleys. Both variants featured red pulleys resembling Meccano components as well as turned brass pulleys. The pedestal supports, like those used for the early tools, were constructed from cast iron, and the baseplates were drilled to accommodate Meccano fittings. Production of the line shaft and tools continued until the onset of the Second World War, with the line shaft being incorporated into the SC2, SC3, and SC4 engines during that time (possibly extending into 1940). Following the war, around 1948, brass pulleys were introduced to the line shaft, alongside the hammer and punch. The flat base plate remained in use, while the C1 line shaft model was discontinued. By the mid-1980s, the Mamod company faced difficulties, resulting in the discontinuation of the SP1, SP3, and SP5 engines, as well as the separate tools and line shaft. However, all five components continued to be manufactured as part of the WS workshop.

== Mobile Engine Range 1961–to 2024 ==
Mamod manufactured a diverse range of self-propelled models. These models primarily depict various types of vehicles that were commonly powered by steam in the past.

=== Steamroller SR1 and SR1A ===
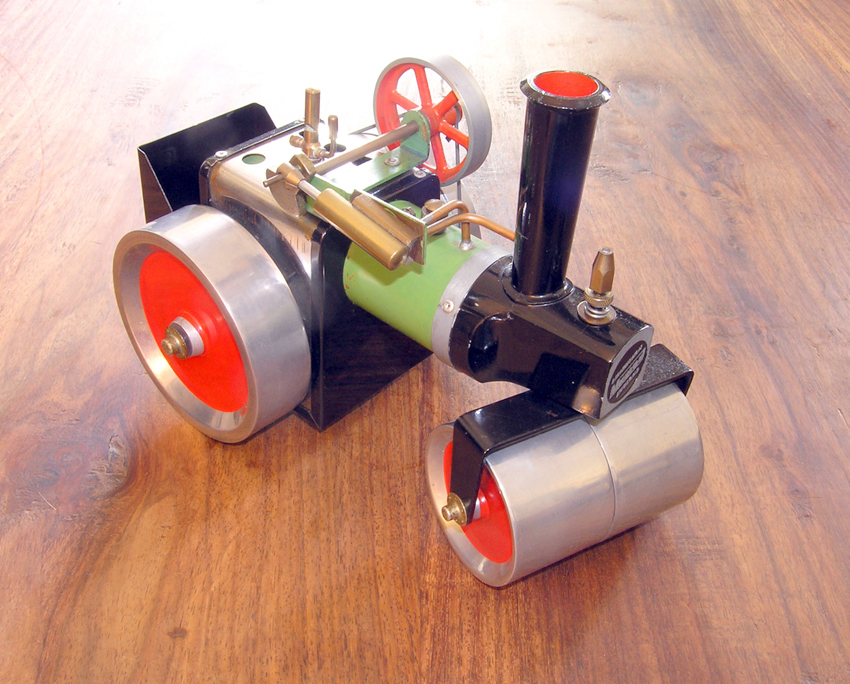
A SR1 roller from c1965, it clearly shows the pop rivet construction.

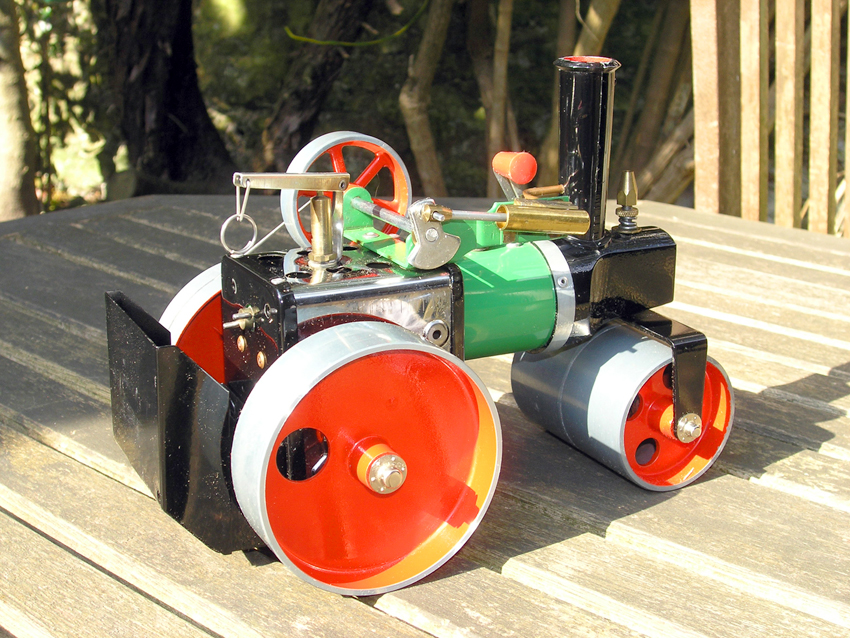
A Mamod SR1a roller dating from 1973

The SR1 steam roller was Mamod's inaugural mobile steam toy, debuting in January 1961 and designed by Eric Malins. Initially, the rollers could only move in a single direction at a relatively slow speed, deviating from typical steam roller functionality. These engines utilized a modified MM2 steam unit and distinctive rolls made of aluminum alloy. Early versions of the SR1, along with the TE1 steam tractor and stationary range, were constructed with screw-together assemblies and featured a brass vaporizing lamp attached to the scuttle. They lacked a towing hook. Starting in 1963, an updated burner design was implemented, similar to the one used in the TE1, which incorporated a handle that doubled as a towing hook. However, it wasn't until 1969 that there were accompanying wagons to be towed, such as the OW1 Open Wagon and LB1 Lumber Wagon. In 1965, the roller transitioned to pop rivet construction, aligning with the assembly method used throughout the Mamod steam toy range. Consequently, it is easy to distinguish early 1960s rollers from later ones. In 1967, the SR1 evolved into the SR1a with the introduction of a basic reversing mechanism in the engine unit, similar to the 1965 MEC1 Meccano engine. The TE1 also underwent a similar transition to become the TE1a. In 1968, aluminum rollers and wheels were replaced by Mazak counterparts, a material that is still used today. Over its 60-year existence, the roller has undergone incremental changes, such as burner modifications (shifting to solid fuel circa 1976) and the replacement of overflow plug boilers with sight glass boilers circa 1978. Other alterations have primarily been cosmetic in nature, involving paint, whistles, and smokebox detailing. Early boxed SR1 engines have become sought-after collectibles, often referred to as "nut and bolt" SRs. In recent times, the roller has seen variations, including limited editions with different colors, extended boiler versions, and even a kit version. The 60th anniversary of the SR1's introduction was celebrated in 2021 with a limited production run of 60 units.

=== Traction Engine TE1 and TE1A ===
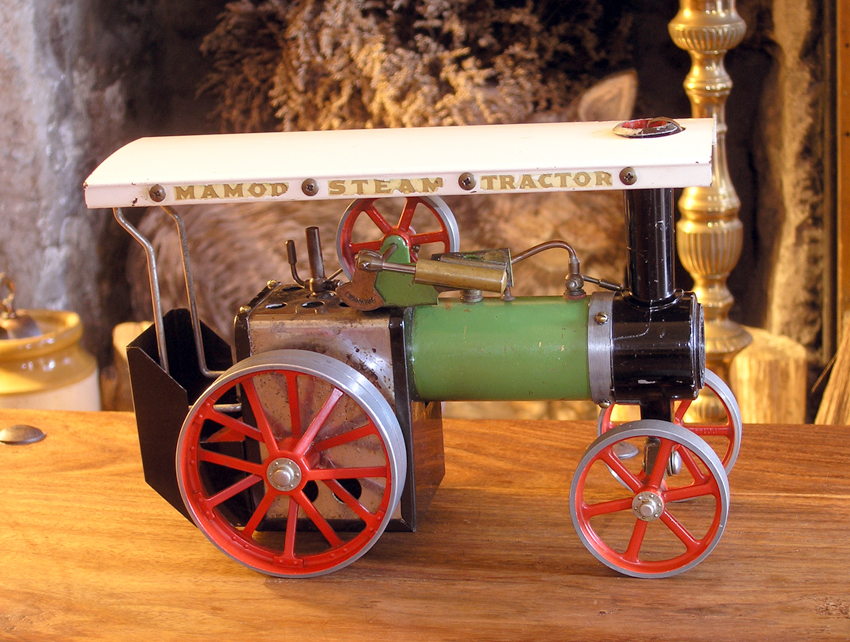
An early Mamod TE1 steam tractor from 1963. It clearly shows the nut and bolt constructions. The smooth canopy top was used for only a few months.

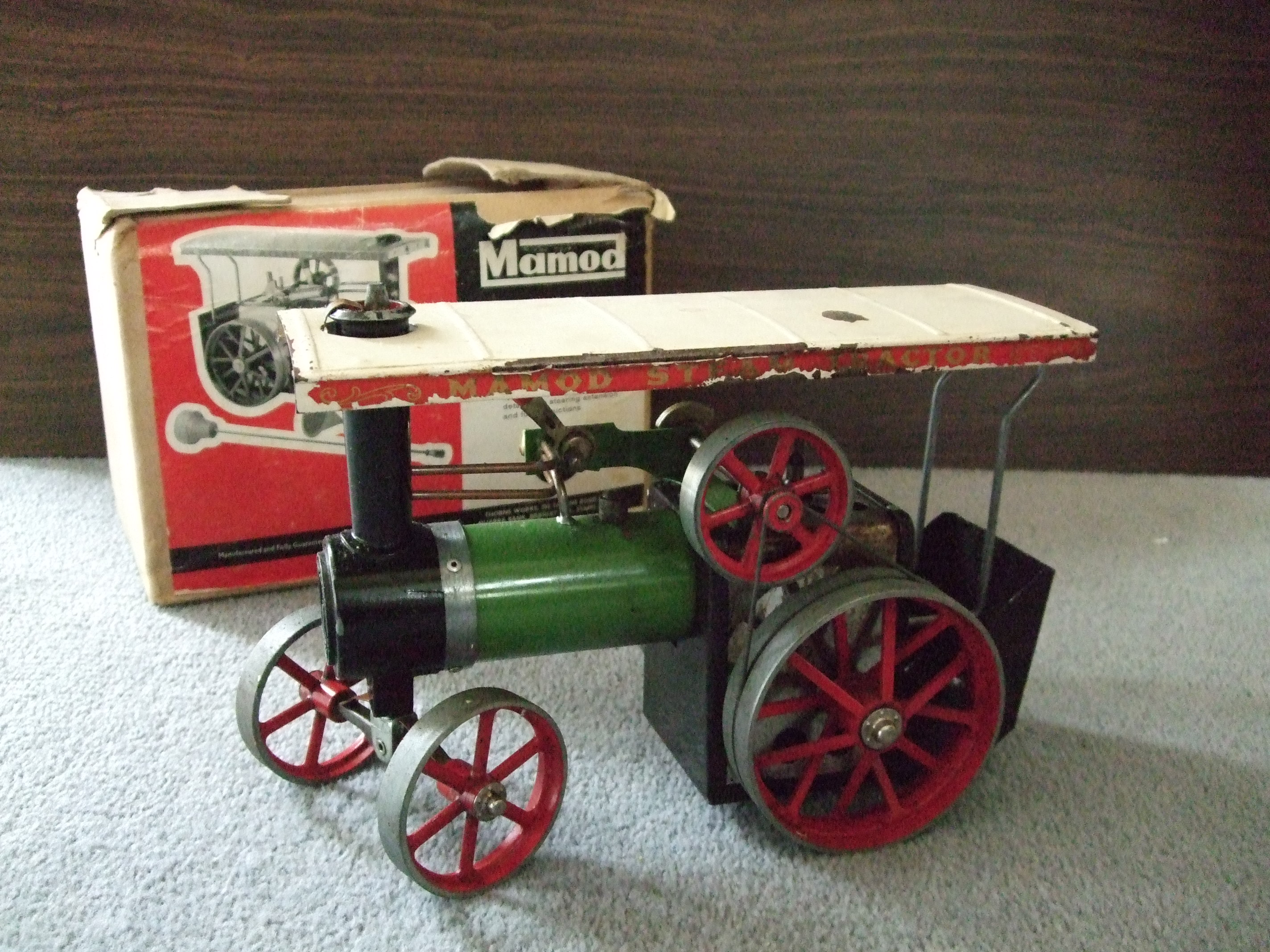
A Mamod TE1a traction engine with the original packaging

The TE1 is considered the "classic" Mamod model and has been continuously produced for over 50 years with minor updates and modifications. It represents a typical traction engine featuring a full-length canopy. The engine itself is an oscillating-cylinder unit, similar to the SR1/a model based on the old MM2 unit. While the TE1 has a longer boiler compared to the SR1, the internal volume remains the same. In earlier versions, the front part of the boiler served as an empty space where exhaust steam was directed through the choke to control its exit, not the inlet steam. The TE1a differs from the TE1 in having a reversing lever that regulates the model's speed and direction, a feature initially introduced in the 1965 MEC1 and later applied to the TE model in 1967. On the other hand, the TE1 was unidirectional and relied on an exhaust "choke" for speed control. The TE1 was advertised as being capable of covering a third of a mile in ten minutes on a single fill of steam. Power is transmitted to the rear axle through a drive band connected from a small pulley on the flywheel to the rim of one of the back wheels. This band can be removed to allow the engine to operate in a stationary position or to drive a line shaft and tools. The front axle of the model is mounted on a central pivot with a basic copper stub spring that provides a rudimentary form of suspension. Additionally, it is steerable through a shaft that extends from the axle up inside the chimney (in later models, post-1967). Early models employed a direct rod connection for steering, while later versions utilized a control rod attached to the top of the shaft, featuring a wooden handle for manoeuvring the model during movement. The TE1/A model features a green boiler (variations in shades of green have occurred over the years, ranging from apple green to dark brunswick green, similar to GWR locomotives), red spoked wheels and flywheel, a white/cream-colored canopy, and a black firebox/smokebox/chimney. Additionally, it is available in a distinct alternative paint scheme with a polished brass boiler and maroon wheels. In the past decade, limited edition models have been released with blue or black paintwork, as well as variations of the aforementioned colors. The 60th anniversary of the TE1's introduction was celebrated in 2023 with a limited production run of 200 units.

=== Steam Wagon SW1 ===
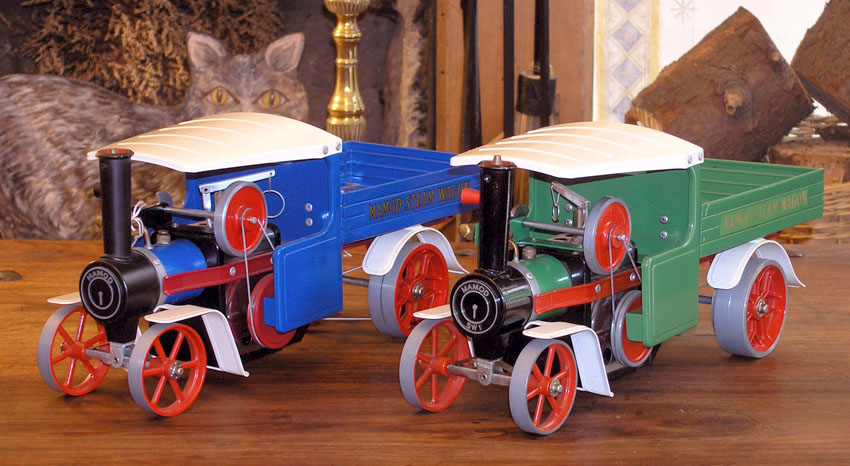
A blue SW1 wagon from 1988 and a green SW1 wagon from 1973.

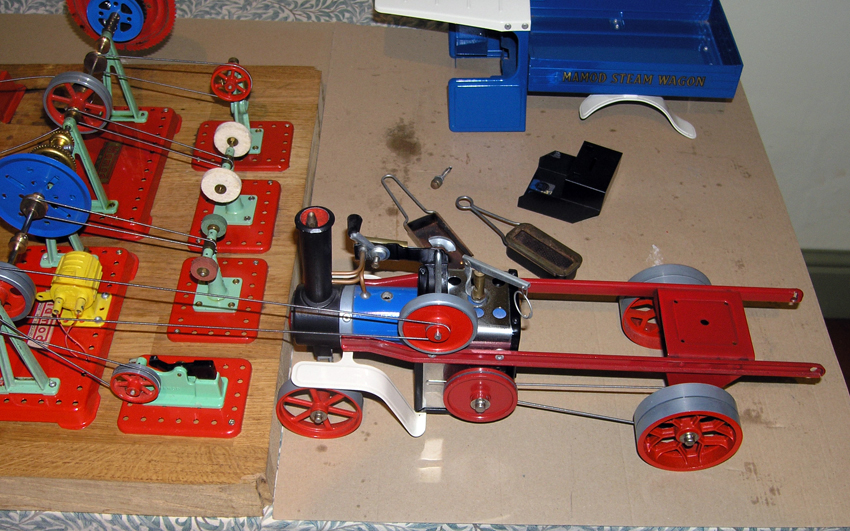
A 1988 blue SW1 steam wagon, minus the body work, showing the double reduced drive and chassis.

The SW1 steam wagon is a variant of the SR/TE engines within the Mamod range, first manufactured in 1972. The design of the model is largely credited to Steve Malins, the grandson of Malins Engineers' founder. It is said that Steve drew inspiration from Maurice A. Kelly's 1971 book titled "The Overtype Steam Road Wagon." The SW1 incorporates components from the SR1a roller and TE1a traction engines and features a truck-style rear body with a cab and payload bed. The extended body is supported by a C-section girder chassis. The engine utilizes a double-reduced drive system with a large intermediate pulley, similar to the flywheel, allowing for more realistic speed and enhanced pulling power. The wagon has a live rear axle with diamond-spoked wheels resembling a Foden design (hence it being sometimes referred to as the 'Foden Wagon'). It is distinguishable by its red wheels and a blue, green, or brown body, complemented by a white quarter-length canopy over the engine and boiler. Additional details include mudguards and the optional cargo of barrels. Limited-edition models have been introduced in darker shades of green and black. Variations of the SW1 include a blue version with white lettering on the rear payload body and the SW1B model featuring deep brown bodywork and cream wheels. Forest Classics released a limited-edition version in an all-black color scheme, producing 100 units. The steam wagon remains in production as of 2012 and is highly regarded as one of the company's finest mobile models.

Early steam wagons were initially produced in green with an ALCOHOL vaporizing burner. Around 1977, they transitioned to solid fuel pan burners and, by 1978, incorporated a sight glass instead of the typical overflow plug, with blue paint replacing the previous green colour. In the early 2000s, a brown version of the model was introduced. The engine features a spring-loaded whistle and steering gear from the TE1a. The rear scuttle, designed to hold the burner, is identical to those found on the SR and TE models but fits snugly between the two girder chassis parts. Weighing approximately 6 lb (2.7 kg), the SW1 steam wagon offers excellent value for its size and continues to be a popular choice among collectors.

In 2022, an updated limited edition of the steam wagon was released to commemorate the 50th anniversary of its original introduction.

=== Showman's Engine ===
This model is another variation based on the TE1A, designed to resemble a showman's road locomotive. Similar to real-life showman's engines, it retains the basic structure of a traction engine while incorporating a dynamo and certain aesthetic details. The Showman's model features twisted-brass canopy supports, a chain-steering drum (which is non-functional), and a vibrant paint scheme with a maroon boiler and yellow wheels. Mechanically, the Showman's model differs from the TE1A in the inclusion of a dynamo and the use of a solid flywheel. The dynamo is positioned above the smokebox and supplies power to a series of LEDs installed around the canopy. It is driven by a drive band connected to the flywheel.

=== 'Centurion' TE1AC ===
The 'Centurion' is an upgraded version of the TE1A model, featuring Mamod's piston valve engine, which offers increased power and performance compared to the SP6-SP8 engines. Apart from the engine, the Centurion shares the same design and maintains the green and red color scheme of the earlier model.

=== 'Challenger' SR1AC ===
The 'Challenger' is the steamroller variant of the 'Centurion'. Similar to other steamrollers in the range, it features modifications such as an elongated front frame to accommodate the front roller and larger, solid rear wheels. In contrast to the previous steamroller model, the 'Challenger' includes a full-length canopy, resembling the design of the traction engine models.

=== Showman's Special ===
This is the Showman's variant of the 'Centurion' model. It features the identical additional details found in the Showman's model based on the TE1A, as well as the same color scheme.

=== Roadster SA1 ===
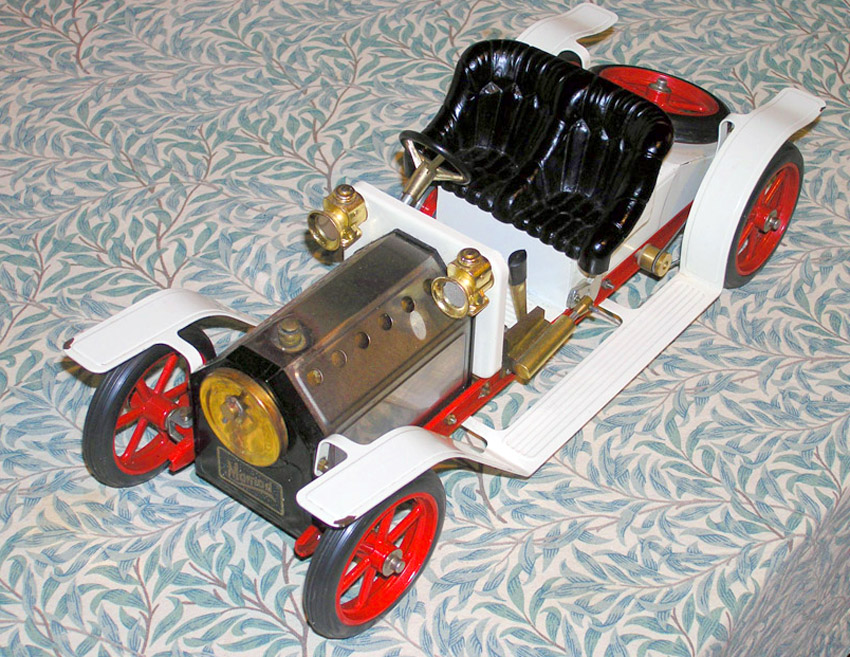
An early Roadster dating from 1976, showing overflow plug type boiler and 6-spoke artillery wheels.

This model represents a two-seater roadster-style car, potentially inspired by the appearance and style of an early 20th-century Mercer Raceabout or Talbot 4AB. It was introduced in late 1976 and designed by Steve Malins with input from George Morris. The initial versions were painted in red and white with black upholstery, which is still available, while newer versions have recently been released with green/brass or burgundy/brass finishes. Additionally, a silver 4-seater limousine variant, based on the Roadster, gained popularity in the 1980s. The boiler cover serves as the car's "bonnet," and the water level can be checked through the sight glass, which resembles a radiator grille. Early versions featured the traditional overflow plug, which was later replaced by the sight glass in 1978 to comply with the new Euro Toy Regulations. Initially, the Roadsters were fueled by meth, but starting around 1977, all models utilized a steel pan-type solid fuel burner, although the older steel pan meth burners were still compatible. The oscillating-cylinder engine is externally mounted on the left side of the model and incorporates a simple forward and reverse lever similar to the SE2a and MEC1 stationary engines. This engine drives a small, solid flywheel externally positioned on the right side through a shaft. In early models, the drive was split, with the final drive on the left side, but in later and current models, the drive is entirely on the right side. A power band connects this shaft to the rear axle. This configuration allows for a slightly higher road speed compared to the SW1 wagon but makes the model much slower than the TE1 traction engine, which had an excessively high speed. The same chassis and layout are used in other mobile models within the Mamod range, such as the LB1 London 'bus," the FE1 fire engine, the SA1L limousine, and the DV1/2 vans. The early wheels resembled wooden carriage wheels (referred to as artillery wheels) with solid rubber tires, while later models adopted a redesigned wheel design based on the Rolls-Royce Silver Ghost. Various details, including running boards, spare wheels, and carriage lamps, are also present on the model.

=== Silver Limousine SA1L ===
This model represents an Edwardian-style limousine, resembling the Rolls-Royce Silver Ghost. It features a gray or silver paint finish with black upholstery and hood, and it is based on the SA1 model.

The limousine is also offered in an alternative color scheme, featuring maroon bodywork and brass or gold wheels. This variant is known as the SA1B.

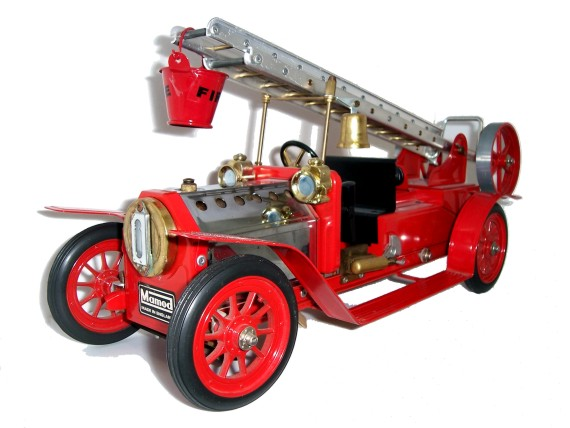
A Mamod FE1 Fire Engine

=== Fire Engine FE1 ===
The model features a standard chassis with a front-mounted boiler and a mid-mounted oscillating engine. However, its rear body is equipped with a turntable ladder, complete with visible cranking wheels. The model is painted in a vibrant red with polished chromework, reminiscent of fire engines manufactured by Leyland during the 1920s.

=== Delivery Van DV1 and DV2 ===
This model depicts a standard British light commercial vehicle commonly seen during the interwar period. It features an enclosed rear body with twin rear-opening doors and an open driving position. The model is painted in either dark green (DV1) or dark blue (DV2) with brass detailing, and it displays the Mamod livery.

=== Post Office Van PO1 ===
This model is derived from the DV1 model, featuring an extended rear body and an enclosed driving position. It resembles the Post Office vans of that period, being painted red with black mudguards, wheels, and bonnet. Additionally, it proudly displays the 'GR' royal insignia, indicating its association with the reign of King George V.

=== Le Mans Racer LM1 ===
This model represents a typical 2-seat racing car from the Edwardian or interwar period, commonly used in endurance races like the Le Mans 24 Hour Race. It shares the same chassis and layout as the Roadster and Limo models but features a two-cylinder uni-directional engine with external cylinders on each side of the chassis for increased power. The car has an open 'cockpit' design with a sleek, aerodynamically sloped rear end. It is available in red or blue bodywork (with a rare green variant), including fenders and wheels, and has a chrome boiler cowl. The model is adorned with the racing number '12'. While utilizing the same running gear and pistons as other engines in the Mamod lineup, it is the fastest among the mobile models. Additionally, this particular model can be equipped with a radio control receiver for steering control.

=== London Bus LB1 ===
The Mamod London Bus, introduced in 1989, serves as the flagship model of the Mamod Mobile Range. Its design is inspired by early double-decker buses like the LGOC X-type. The bus features the livery of the London General Omnibus Company and is adorned with Mamod advertisements in the style of the Edwardian era. Its bodywork is painted red, complemented by black wheels. Similar to the Steam Wagon model, it showcases distinctive spoked rear wheels. The bus has an open top deck and an open rear staircase. Additionally, a green livery option is available.

=== Mamod Meteor and Conqueror boats ===
The Meteor and Conqueror models had limited commercial success and were produced for a short period of time. The Meteor, designed to resemble a Second World War torpedo boat, operated using steam power and achieved approximately 1,500 sales. On the other hand, the Conqueror was an electrically powered variant of the Meteor, utilizing a FROG Revmaster motor. Both models shared the same all-steel hull construction. The Meteor featured a single-cylinder engine similar to the ME1, while the Conqueror relied on a battery with a slightly modified inner hull to accommodate four D-type cells held in a metal holder. The motor of the Conqueror drove the prop shaft through a spring-steel belt and pulley system. Mamod's foray into electric power with the Conqueror proved even less successful than the Meteor, with approximately 200 units sold at the same price as the steam version. Both models were discontinued in 1952, increasing their appeal among collectors.

=== ME1, ME2 and ME3 Marine Steam Engines ===
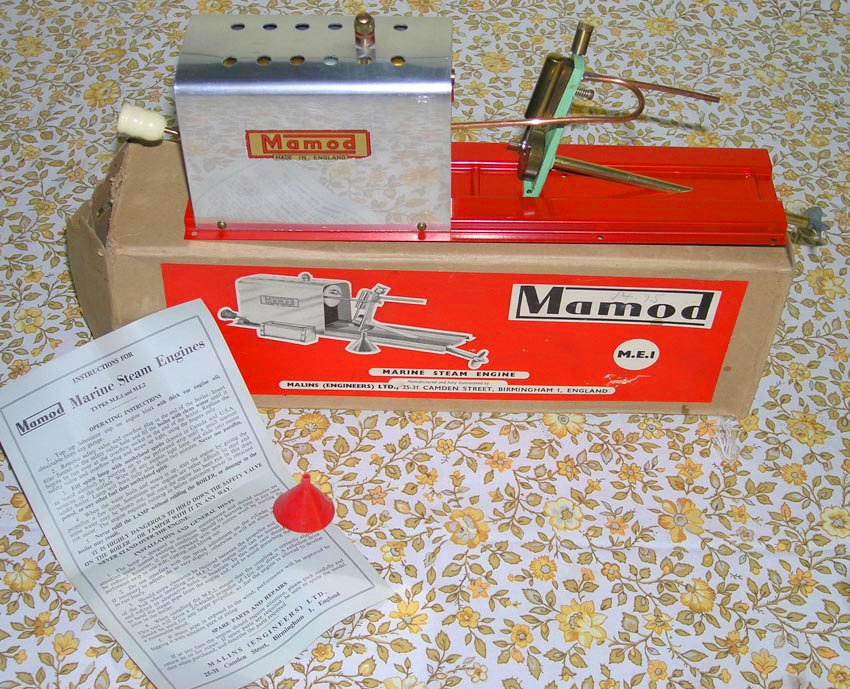
An ME1 marine engine from 1958 complete with box, instructions and filler funnel.

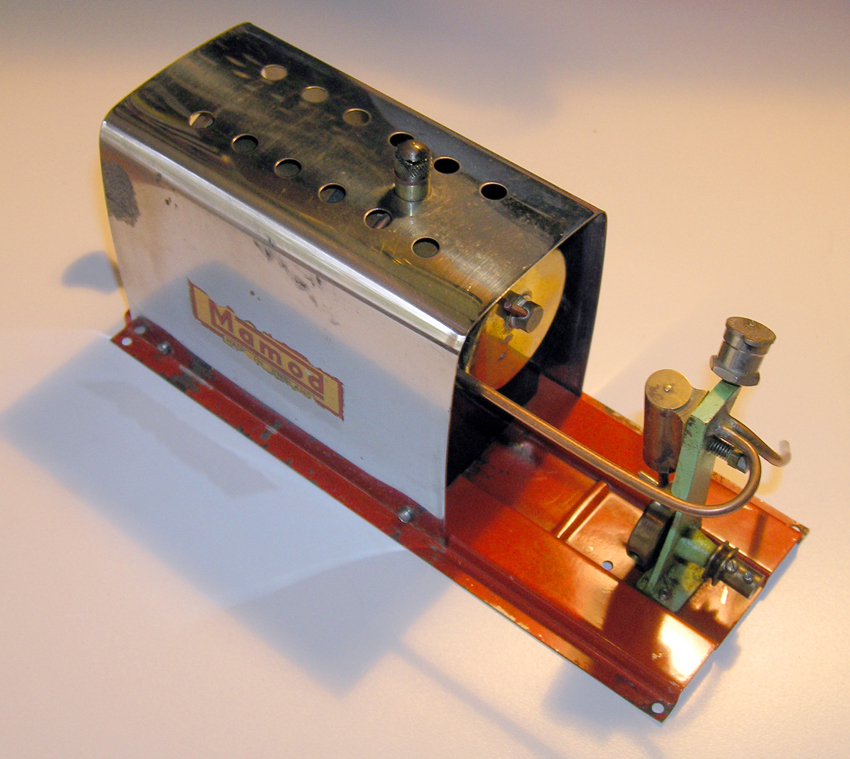
A very rare Mamod ME2 from 1958, showing the upright engine unit and Rotherams pot oiler

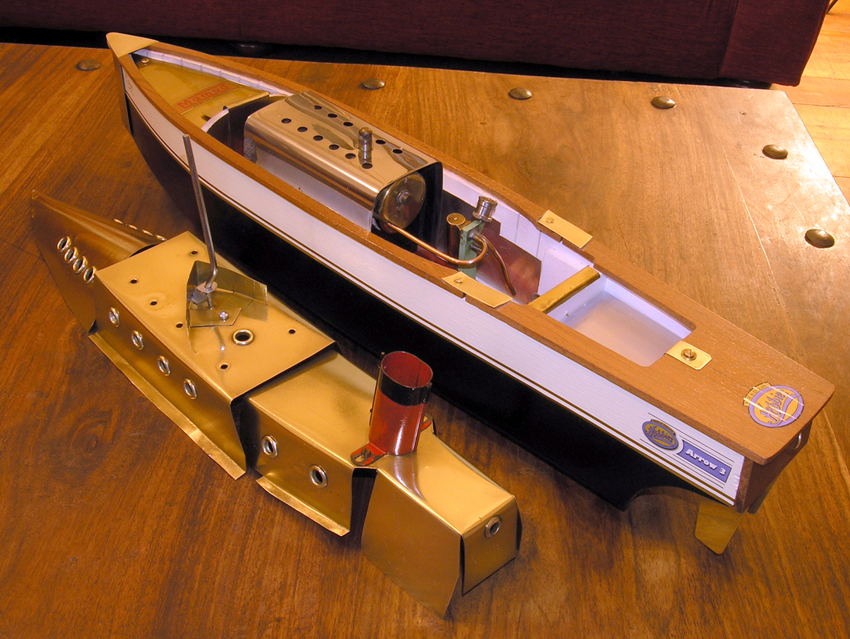
A Hobbies 'Arrow' named Eldoret, showing the inner workings with a Mamod ME2 steam power plant.

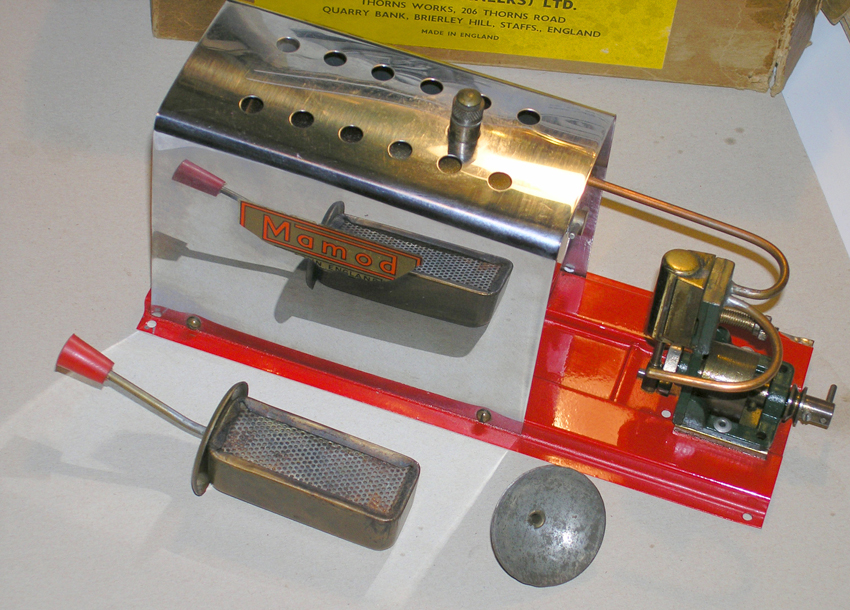
A Mamod ME3 from 1965, showing its SEL engine unit. Complete with original shield type burner.

Following the unsuccessful performance of the Mamod Meteor and Conqueror boats during the years 1949–1952, Malins Engineers introduced the ME1 and ME2 engines in 1958. These marine engines were specifically designed for installation in model boats measuring approximately 24 inches (0.61 m) in length. The engines were constructed with polished brass, chromium plating, and red and green paint finishes. Fuel was provided by a methylated spirit vaporizing lamp.

The ME1 engine featured direct drive with a 1.75-inch (44 mm) diameter boiler. Its cylinder had a stroke of 0.75 inches (19 mm) and a bore of 5/16 inch (8 mm), driving a two-bladed propeller with a diameter of 1.25 inches (32 mm).

Introduced alongside the ME1 in 1958, the ME2 engine had identical dimensions to the ME3, except for the use of a Mamod upright engine instead of the SEL upright engine found in the ME3. However, the ME2 did not achieve significant success and was eventually replaced by the ME3 in 1965. The ME1's comprehensive engine unit design likely worked against the ME2's success, as it only consisted of the boiler and engine unit.

Both the ME1 and ME2 can be found with aluminium boiler cowls as opposed to the normal steel. The metal finish has a duller and fairly easy to spot. These iterations are harder to find.

The ME3 engine was essentially similar to the ME2, but with a more robust engine unit (an SEL 1560 Steam Launch Unit) capable of powering a larger propeller. It utilized the ME1 boiler and featured a ½-inch (12.5 mm) stroke and a 7/16-inch (11 mm) bore. The engine could drive a three-bladed propeller with a diameter of 1.5 inches (38 mm) through a pulley system, unlike the stern tube setup used by the ME1. Similar to many other marine engines produced by Mamod, the SEL engine used in the ME3 did not incorporate a lubricator and required meticulous adjustment for optimal functioning. Production of the ME3 lasted from 1965 to 1972, during which time approximately 2,700 units were manufactured using all the available SEL engines obtained at a discounted price from J & L Randall, the parent company of the SEL brand.

== Mamod Steam Railway ==
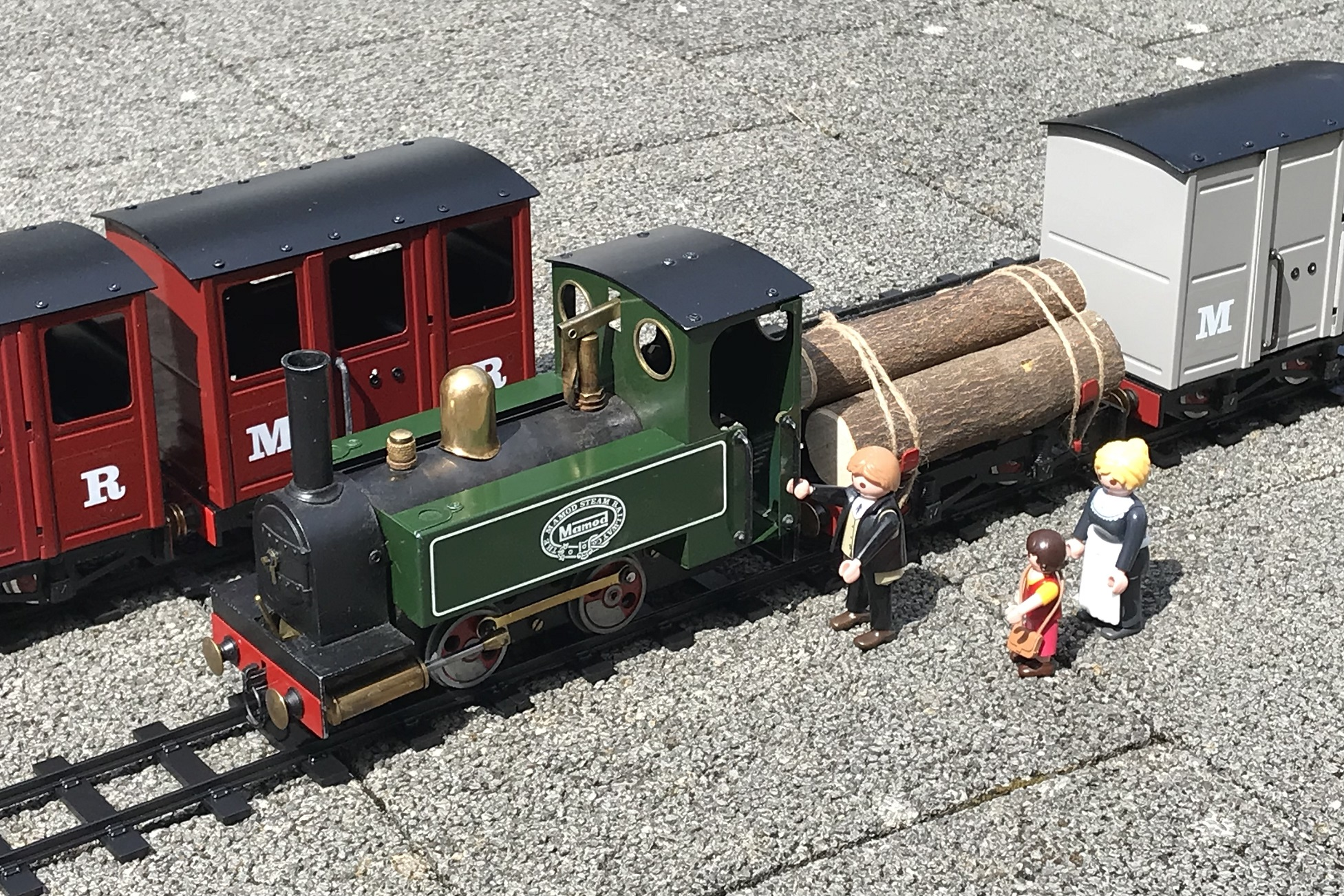
Mamod 16 mm gauge live steam railway.

In late 1979, Mamod introduced its initial model railway, the SL-1 locomotive, along with a limited selection of rolling stock and track. The model represented a narrow gauge railway, and, although it did not replicate a specific prototype, it was built to approximately 16 mm scale, representing a gauge of around 2 feet (610 mm).

Known as the Mamod Steam Railway, this offering became the first affordable, mass-produced live steam set in the United Kingdom, experiencing successful sales. Mamod swiftly expanded the range by introducing additional locomotives, namely the SL-2 and SL-3, available in both ready-to-run and kit-form versions, catering to O (32 mm) and 1 (45 mm) gauges. These locomotives featured a pair of double-acting, oscillating cylinders connected to a rotary reversing valve, allowing for slow and self-starting operations in theory. Special edition locomotives, further rolling stock, and points were also manufactured. The current range comprises redesigned versions that retain the same fundamental configuration while offering various mechanical and cosmetic upgrades to enhance Mamod locomotives.

In 2006, two other companies began producing models based on the original Mamod locomotive designs:

- MSS (Mamod Sales and Services) continues manufacturing and selling the basic locomotive and stock, alongside a newly introduced saddle tank model in 2004.
- Mamod Steam Models produces a wide range of Mamod models, including an upgraded version of the SL-1 locomotive design featuring improved running gear.

Moreover, the fundamental design of the Mamod locomotives has inspired several enhanced versions produced by independent manufacturers. Notable examples include the Creekside Forge & Foundry Baldwin, the PPS Janet, and the IP Engineering Jane. Additionally, various manufacturers offer upgraded components for the original Mamod line. A popular upgrade involved fitting the locomotive with a methylated spirit burner, generating greater heat and enabling higher boiler pressure and increased hauling capacity.

In an attempt to create an affordable locomotive, the "Harry the Rocket" model was introduced. However, the name was misleading, as it bore no resemblance to Stephenson's locomotive of the same name. The experiment proved unsuccessful, resulting in limited sales and subsequent collectability. Another later and more successful offering was the "Brunel" engine, featuring a vertical boiler. Despite its name, this model was based on the De-Winton style of engines commonly found in Welsh slate quarries. The "Brunel" model is still available to this day.

== Malins Engineers in receivership ==
In 1980, the company faced receivership primarily due to the substantial financial investment in the SP series of engines as well as the new RS1 and RS2 railway sets. This occurred during a period of economic downturn when many companies were encountering financial challenges, leading banks to demand loan repayments and finance agreements. Malins Engineers' bank requested repayment, granting the company a weekend to secure the funds. However, the company was unable to raise the required capital, resulting in administration. Nonetheless, the company quickly returned to profitable trading within a few weeks, experiencing improved sales. Eric Malins, the managing director, and his son Steve Malins relinquished control of the company, marking the end of the Malins' family involvement with Mamod.

Since then, Mamod has undergone changes in ownership and manufacturing locations, having faced the possibility of closure in 1989. Presently, the company is under the ownership of the Terry family and operates from a location near its original establishment in Smethwick, West Midlands. Mamod ceased to produce its diverse range of mobile engines, stationary models, machine tools, as well as O and 1 gauge railway locomotives in summer 2024.

== Related Companies ==
Mamod models continue to maintain their popularity today due to their affordability and wide variety. The availability of spare and replacement parts from various small manufacturers has contributed to a thriving market. Second-hand models are easily accessible and inexpensive, frequently serving as the foundation for modifications undertaken by modelers.

== Running and lubrication requirements ==
Most Mamod engines do not incorporate lubricators for storing and supplying oil to moving components like the piston and bearings. Only the early pre-war engines, such as the SE3/4, and some marine engines, like the Meteor boat, were equipped with lubricators. Instead, oil needs to be manually applied to the necessary parts before each operation.

Prior to 1976/77, all Mamod engines utilized methylated spirits (known as "denatured alcohol" in some countries), which were stored in a reservoir burner or a vaporizing spirit lamp. However, the implementation of stricter health and safety regulations and European toy regulations led to the prohibition of liquid fuel for steam toys in the UK from 1977 onwards. In response to safety concerns and an incident involving an exploding fuel lamp in 1976, Malins made the decision to switch to solid fuel.

The engines were then modified to burn dry hexamine fuel tablets, which were produced by Malins on their premises. Solid fuel, although safer in certain aspects compared to "meths," emits unpleasant and toxic fumes and generates less heat while burning. These tablets were withdrawn following government anti-terror legislation banning the sale of hexamine without a licence in October 2023. This led to a pause in sales while a fuel gel alternative was developed, released shortly before the company closed in August 2024.

Newer models can use aftermarket butane gas burners, which is likely to become the standard due to restrictions on mailing flammable substances, including solid fuel tablets. Butane gas can be readily obtained from DIY stores.

When operating a Mamod model, it is advisable to use distilled or soft, clean water for steaming purposes.

== Closure ==
In August 2024, the company closed citing increasing running costs including on the lease of its factory unit in Smethwick and the unexpected costs incurred by the earlier ban on hexamine fuel.

== See also ==
- Wilesco
- Jensen Steam Engines
- MiniSteam
