= Harry Meritt =

English footballer

Personal information
- Full name: Harold George Meritt
- Date of birth: 22 September 1920
- Place of birth: Ormskirk, England
- Date of death: March 2004 (aged 83)
- Place of death: Poole, England
- Height: 5 ft 8 in (1.73 m)
- Position: Inside forward

Youth career
- 1932–1937: Everton

Senior career*
Years	Team	Apps	(Gls)
1937–1945	Everton	0	(0)
1945–1947	Leyton Orient	1	(0)
1947	Margate	1	(0)
–1948	Yeovil Town		
1948–1950	Trowbridge Town		
1950–1953	Dorchester Town		
1953–1954	Poole Town		
1954	Longfleet St Mary's		
- * Club domestic league appearances and goals

Harold George Meritt (22 September 1920 – March 2004) was an English semi-professional footballer who made one appearance in the Football League for Leyton Orient.

== Personal life ==
Meritt served in the British Army during the Second World War.

== Career statistics ==
Appearances and goals by club, season and competition
Club	Season	League			FA Cup		Total	
Club	Season	Division	Apps	Goals	Apps	Goals	Apps	Goals
Leyton Orient	1946–47	Third Division South	1	0	0	0	1	0
Margate	1947–48	Kent League	1	0	―		1	0
Career total			2	0	0	0	2	2
