= Merritt (given name) =

Merritt is a masculine and feminine given name. It is of British origin and is traditionally a male name. Notable people with the name include:

- Merritt Brunies (1895–1973), American jazz trombonist and cornetist
- Merritt Bucholz (born 1966), American architect
- Merritt Butrick (1959–1989), American actor
- Merritt L. Campbell (1864–1915), American politician
- Merritt Clark (1803–1898), businessman and politician
- Merritt Cooke Jr. (1884–1967), American football player
- Merritt B. Curtis (1892–1966), United States Marine Corps officer
- Merritt A. Edson (1897–1955), United States Marine Corps general
- Merritt Lyndon Fernald (1873–1950), American botanist
- Merritt Gant (born 1971), guitarist
- Merritt B. Gerstad (1900–1974), American cinematographer
- Merritt Giffin (1887–1911), American athlete
- Merritt J. Gordon (1859–1925), associate justice of the Washington Supreme Court
- Merritt Green (1930–2016), American football player
- Merritt Eldred Hoag (1909–1994), lieutenant colonel in the U.S. Army
- Merritt Hotchkiss (1814–1865), Canadian politician
- Merritt Y. Hughes (1893–1971), academic
- Merritt David Janes, American stage actor and singer
- merritt k, Canadian video game designer
- Merritt Kellogg (1832–1922), missionary
- Merritt Lamb (1892–1918), scout
- Merritt Mathias (born 1990), American soccer forward
- Merritt Mauzey (1897–1973), American lithographer, author and illustrator
- Merritt C. Mechem (1870–1946), jurist and politician
- Merritt Patterson (born 1990), Canadian actress
- Merritt Paulson, American businessman
- Merritt Putman (1900–1995), Canadian cross-country skier
- Merritt Ranew (1938–2011), American baseball player
- Merritt J. Reid (1855–1932), American architect
- Merritt C. Ring (1850–1915), American lawyer
- Merritt Ruhlen (born 1944), American linguist
- Merritt Roe Smith (born 1940), American historian
- Merritt Starkweather (1891–1972), architect
- Merritt Wever (born 1980), American actress
- Merritt F. White (1865–1934), American politician

== See also ==
- Merritt (surname)
- Merritte W. Ireland (1867–1952), U.S. Army Surgeon General
