= Action! Drama! Suspense! =

Studio album by Honor Bright
- Released: July 20, 2010
- Recorded: November/December 2009
- Genre: Pop punk
- Label: Triple Crown
- Producer: Tom Denney & Jason Lancaster

Honor Bright chronology
If This Was a Movie (2008)	Action! Drama! Suspense! (2010)

Action! Drama! Suspense! is the second full-length album from Syracuse, NY pop-punk band, Honor Bright. This is their first album on Triple Crown Records, and was released on July 20, 2010. The album was produced by Tom Denney, formerly of A Day To Remember, and Jason Lancaster, of Go Radio and formerly of Mayday Parade.

== Track listing ==
1. "How to Break a Heart" – 3:16
2. "Sleepless in Syracuse" – 3:26
3. "Paper Thin Walls" – 3:19
4. "Off Limits" – 3:51
5. "Welcome to New York, Now Get a Job" – 2:56
6. "There's a Lesson to be Learned Here" – 3:08
7. "Stay Gold, Dennis Hoffman, Stay Gold" – 3:29
8. "Hush Symphony" – 3:15
9. "Don't Tell Mama" – 3:02
10. "Hold Fast" – 2:51
11. "Bednotch and Boomsticks" – 3:27

"Bednotch and Boomsticks" includes a hidden bonus track titled "Cause in All the Candles" – 2:36
