= Honor Bright =

American rock band

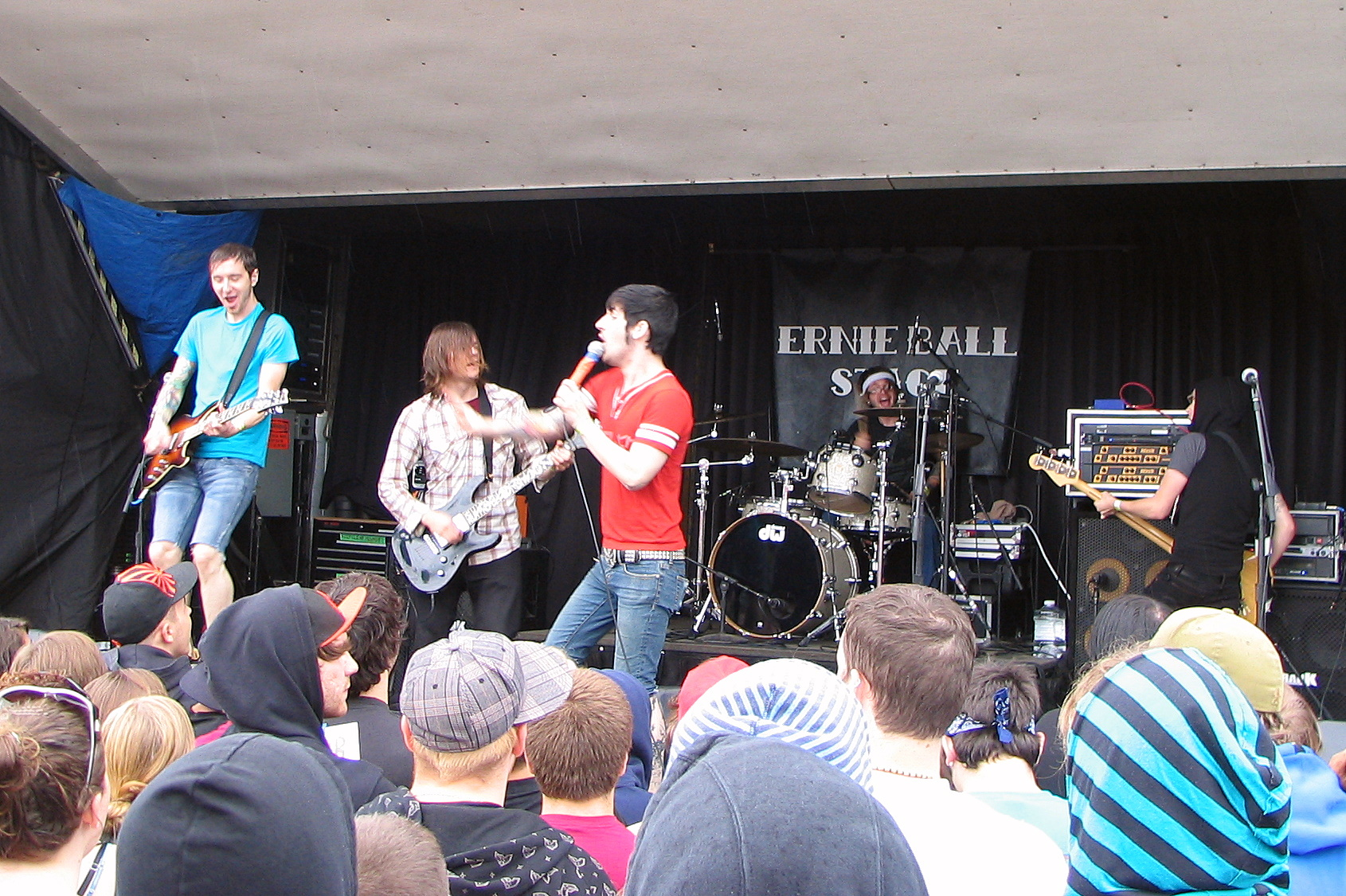
- Warped Tour Buffalo

Background information
- Origin: Syracuse, New York, United States
- Genres: Pop punk
- Years active: 2006–2011, 2013–2015
- Labels: Triple Crown, Aux
- Members: Liam DiCosimo; Ryan Gilmore; Curt Henry; Anthony Merritt; Tim Paige
- Website: www.honorbright.net

Honor Bright was an American rock band from Syracuse, New York.

== History ==
=== Formation ===
Honor Bright first started when Liam DiCosimo and Tim Paige's post-hardcore band broke up, leaving them without a project. Together they started writing new songs that would become Honor Bright. Anthony Merritt had previously played in a band with Liam and was recruited to play bass. Curt Henry, former member of "The Arlo Story", was found through an internet post made by Liam searching for a drummer. As a four-piece [Liam on guitar], Honor Bright recorded a 5-song self-titled demo and went out on a month-long tour of the country. Upon return, they made the decision to have Ryan Gilmore join and he left his previous band. The lineup remained the same through the life of the band.

=== Early years (2006–2009) ===
The band formed in Syracuse, New York in 2006, and their first recording, a self-titled, 5-song EP, was released that same year. They opened for several acts including Cartel, Anberlin, Boys Like Girls, and Bayside. On June 3, 2007, the band self-released their debut album Build Hearts from Stars. The group was involved in a van accident while touring behind this album. Honor Bright were voted on to the Vans Warped Tour in 2008, playing the Ernie Ball Stage at the Buffalo, NY (Darien Center) show on July 24 of that year. That performance led to the band being chosen to play on MTV's Total Request Live on July 30. They performed an acoustic version of "Home Is A Heartache", a track from their EP, If This Was a Movie, released two days after the MT6V performance.

On August 11, 2008, the band was selected as the front page Featured Artist on PureVolume, where they topped the "Rock", "Emo", "Pop" and "All Genre" charts. In October 2008, Honor Bright signed with The Artery Foundation which manages bands including Alesana, A Day To Remember and A Static Lullaby. On December 1, 2008 the band re-released "Build Hearts From Stars" (with two bonus tracks) on Aux Records at a show in Syracuse while opening for Forever The Sickest Kids. Guitarist Tim Paige formed a solo side project, The Brilliant Light, which has also signed to Aux Records.

In early 2009, they were featured in the unsigned band sections of both Alternative Press (AP) and American Music Press (AMP) magazines. For the second consecutive year, Honor Bright won a spot on the Van's Warped Tour. This time winning AP's AP&R fan vote for the opportunity to play the Cleveland date.

=== Triple Crown era (2009–2011) ===
On July 14, 2009, Honor Bright signed with Triple Crown Records. They recorded for Triple Crown in November/December 2009 in Florida with Tom Denney, formerly of A Day To Remember, and Jason Lancaster of Go Radio and formerly of Mayday Parade. The album, titled Action! Drama! Suspense!, was released on July 20, 2010.

In 2010, Honor Bright was named one of the "100 Bands You Need To Know" in Alternative Press' annual feature. That accolade earned the band a slot on AP's stage at SXSW in Austin, TX. In April 2010, Tim Paige recorded his second disc, "Things That I Won't Need", as The Brilliant Light. On April 13, 2010, Honor Bright was added to first day lineup of The Bamboozle Festival in New Jersey.

In June 2011, Honor Bright announced they would be breaking up on their tumblr page via Tim Paige.

On January 1, 2013, Honor Bright announced on their Facebook page that they would be reuniting, with new music to come.

On April 3, 2015 the band released two new songs, "Arizona" and "Waiting for the End".

== Members ==
- Liam DiCosimo – vocals (2006–2015)
- Tim Paige – vocals, guitar (2006–2015)
- Anthony Merritt – bass vocals (2006–2015)
- Curt Henry – drums, vocals (2006–2015)
- Ryan Gilmore – guitar, vocals (2006–2015)

== Discography ==
Studio albums

- Build Hearts from Stars (self-released, June 3, 2007)
- Action! Drama! Suspense! (Triple Crown Records, July 20, 2010)

EPs

- Get Stoked! (self-released, 2006)
- If This Was a Movie (self-released, August 1, 2008)

Compilations

- Roll Credits (self-released, March 29, 2019)

Singles

- "Arizona" (Aux Records, April 3, 2015)
- "Waiting for the End" (Aux Records, April 3, 2015)
