= Merritt, California =

Unincorporated community in California, United States

Merritt
- Unincorporated community
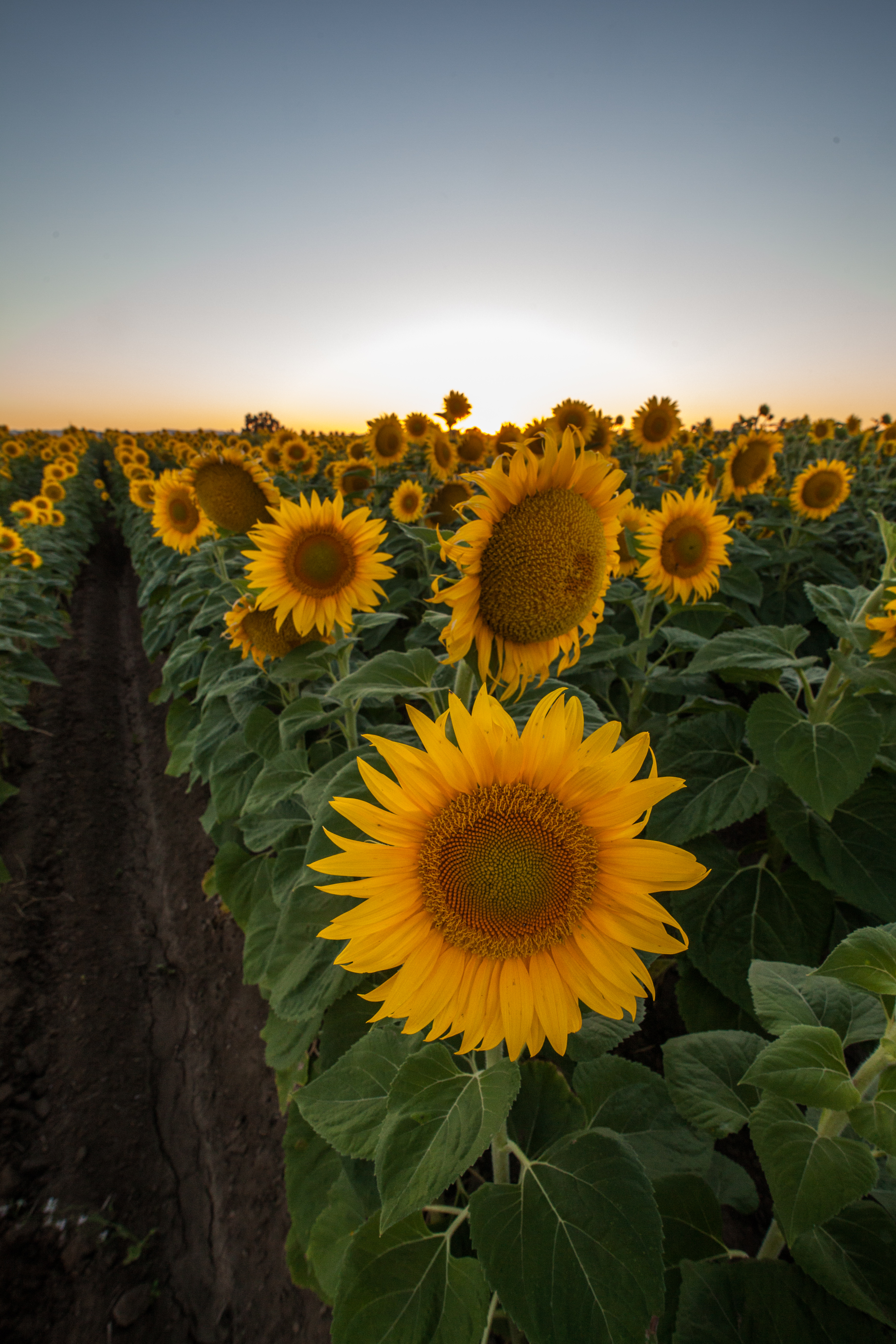
- Sunflowers near Merritt

- Location in California Merritt (the United States)
- Coordinates: 38°36′51″N 121°45′38″W
- Country: United States
- State: California
- County: Yolo
- Elevation: 56 ft (17 m)

Merritt (formerly Meritt) is an unincorporated community in Yolo County, California, United States. It lies at an elevation of 56 feet (17 m). The post office for the area was established in 1859 as "Meritt", and discontinued in 1860. It was reestablished and ran between 1870 and 1873 as "Merritt". It was named after Hiram P. Merritt, who came to Yolo County before 1866. In the late 19th century, Merritt was a shipment point on the railroad for cattle to market. A 1913 book described Merritt, along with Mullen, as farming towns along the main automobile route from Davis to Woodland.
