= Merritt (surname) =

Merritt is a surname.

== Notable people with the surname ==
=== A ===
- A. Merritt (1884–1943), American writer
- Ahmad Merritt (born 1977), American football player
- Amber Merritt (born 1993), Australian wheelchair basketball player
- Anna Lea Merritt (1844–1930), American artist
- Aries Merritt (born 1985), American hurdler

=== B ===
- Bill Merritt (disambiguation), multiple people
- Bob Merritt, American pastor
- Bob Merritt (1945–2011), Australian writer
- Bruce Merritt (born 1958), American canoeist

=== C ===
- Charles Merritt (1908–2000), Canadian lieutenant colonel
- Chris Merritt (born 1952), American opera singer
- Chris Merritt (American football), American football coach
- Clifton R. Merritt (1919–2008), American wildlife advocate
- Constance Merritt (born 1966), American poet

=== D ===
- Dave Merritt (born 1971), American football player
- David Merritt (born 1955), American astrophysicist
- Dicky Merritt (1897–1978), English footballer
- Dixon Lanier Merritt (1879–1972), American poet and humorist
- Donna Marie Merritt (born 1965), American poet
- Doris Honig Merritt (1923–2022), American civil servant and physician

=== E ===
- Earl J. Merritt (1896–1986), American athletic coach
- Edwin Merritt (disambiguation), multiple people
- Emma Frances Grayson Merritt (1860–1933), American educator
- Ernest Merritt (1865–1948), American academic administrator

=== F ===
- Francis E. Merritt (1920–1995), American football player
- Francis Sumner Merritt (1913–2000), American painter, and co-founder of Haystack Mountain School of Crafts

=== G ===
- George Merritt (disambiguation), multiple people
- Gilbert S. Merritt Jr. (1936–2022), American lawyer and jurist

=== H ===
- H. Houston Merritt (1902–1979), American neurologist
- Harold Merritt (born 1951), American basketball coach
- Harry Meritt (1920–2004), English footballer
- H. E. Merritt (1899–1974), British engineer
- Herman Merritt (1900–1927), American baseball player
- Howard Sutermeister Merritt (1915–2007), American art historian
- Hulett C. Merritt (1872–1956), American businessman

=== J ===
- Jacory Croskey-Merritt (born 2001), American football player
- Jack N. Merritt (1930–2018), American general
- James Merritt (minister) (born 1952), American religious leader
- James Merritt (Australian politician) (1856–1943), English-Australian politician
- Jeff Merritt (born 1978), American tech advisor
- Jeralyn Merritt (born 1949), American attorney
- Jim Merritt (baseball) (born 1943), American baseball player
- Jim Merritt (American politician) (born 1959), American politician
- Jody Merritt, American brigadier general
- John Merritt (disambiguation), multiple people
- Josiah Merritt (?–1882), American pioneer
- Jymie Merritt (1926–2020), American bassist

=== K ===
- Katharine Krom Merritt (1886–1986), American physician
- Kathleen Merritt (1901–1985), British conductor and violinist
- Kelsey Merritt (born 1996), Filipino-American model
- Kim Merritt (born 1955), American runner
- Kirk Merritt (born 1997), American football player

=== L ===
- LaShawn Merritt (born 1986), American sprinter
- Lee Merritt, American lawyer
- Leonidas Merritt (1844–1926), American businessman and politician
- Les Merritt (born 1951), American politician
- Lewie G. Merritt (1897–1974), American aviator
- Lloyd Merritt (born 1933), American baseball player

=== M ===
- Marcus M. Merritt (1839–1916), American businessman and politician
- Mark Daniel Merritt (born 1961), American composer
- Marshall Merritt (1904–1978), American painter
- Mary E. Merritt (1881–1953), American nurse
- Matthew Merritt (disambiguation), multiple people
- Max Merritt (1941–2020), New Zealand singer-songwriter
- Mel Merritt (1897–1986), American football player
- Melissa Merritt, American philosopher
- Michael Merritt (disambiguation), multiple people
- Myra Merritt, American soprano

=== N ===
- Natacha Merritt (born 1977), American photographer
- Nathan Merritt (born 1983), Australian rugby league footballer
- Neil Merritt (born 1939), American academic administrator
- Nikki Merritt (born 1972), American politician

=== P ===
- Pamela Merritt, American writer

=== R ===
- Raimi Merritt (born 1993), American wakeboarder
- Rich Merritt (born 1967), American activist
- Robert Merritt (1936–1999), Canadian playwright
- Robert James "Bob" Merritt (1945–2011), Australian writer
- Ryan Merritt (born 1992), American baseball player

=== S ===
- Samuel Merritt (disambiguation), multiple people
- Schute Merritt (1910/1911–1988), American baseball player
- Schuyler Merritt (1853–1953), American politician
- Scott Merritt, Canadian singer-songwriter
- Stephanie Merritt (born 1974), British critic and feature writer
- Stephin Merritt (born 1966), American singer-songwriter
- Steve Merritt (1945–1993), American dancer

=== T ===
- Theresa Merritt (1924–1998), American actress
- Thomas Merritt (disambiguation), multiple people
- Tift Merritt (born 1975), American singer-songwriter
- Tim Merritt (born 1982), American soccer player
- Tione Merritt (born 2001), American rapper
- Tommy Merritt (born 1948), American politician
- Tripp Merritt (born 1968), American football coach
- Troy Merritt (born 1985), American golfer

=== W ===
- W. Davis Merritt, American journalist
- Wesley Merritt (1836–1910), American general
- Whitey Merritt (1869–1916), Canadian ice hockey player
- Wilf Merritt (1864–?), English footballer
- William Merritt (disambiguation), multiple people
- Willie Merritt (1872–1961), American football player

== See also ==
- Merrett, surname
- Senator Merritt (disambiguation), senators surnamed "Merritt"
