= Death Triangle (disambiguation) =

Death Triangle, a professional wrestling trio in All Elite Wrestling.

Death Triangle may also refer to:

- American death triangle, a dangerous type of climbing anchor
- Ukrainian Death Triangle, a concept in Ukrainian historiography

== See also ==
- Triangle of Death
