= Up Denali 3D =

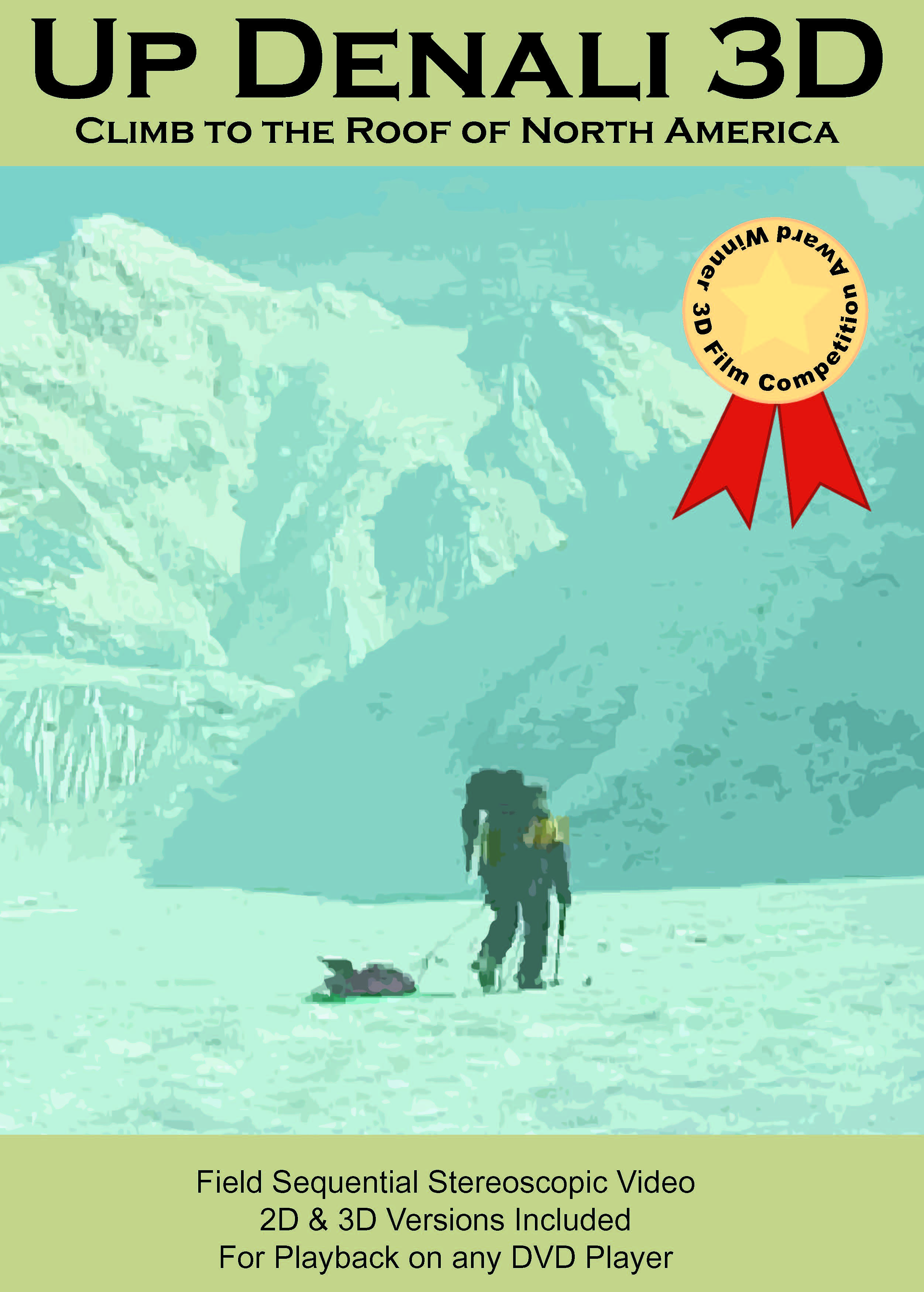
- DVD Cover
- Directed by: Thomas Riederer PE
- Written by: Thomas Riederer
- Produced by: Thomas Riederer
- Starring: CLIMBERS: Thomas Riederer; Mike Smith; Gary D Bacon; Steve Ullman; Phil Fleet; GUIDES: Kirby Spangler; Rob Gowler; OUTFITTER: AMS/ADG.; Colby Coombs; Caitlin Palmer
- Cinematography: Thomas Riederer
- Edited by: Thomas Riederer
- Music by: CSS Music
- Production company: tree-D films
- Release dates: December 20, 2003 (Theatrical - United States); December 1, 2005 (DVD)
- Running time: 28 minutes 2D and 3D versions
- Country: United States
- Language: English

Up Denali 3D is a stereoscopic (3D) documentary directed and produced by Thomas Riederer PE. The film portrays an adventure trek and technical summit climb of Denali, which is also known as Mount McKinley, the highest mountain in North America. Denali has an altitude of 20,320 feet, and is one of the Seven Summits of the World. Situated in Alaska, in Denali National Park and Preserve near the Arctic Circle, a June Denali climb is spent without darkness. The sun does not set all month. Due to high altitudes and lower temperatures from the mountain being closer to the North Pole, the entire climb is spent on snow.

== Background ==
Up Denali 3D is the fifth 3D mountaineering movie from 3D Films in the series of Seven Summits in Three Dimensions. Previous 3D films were shot on Cerro Aconcagua, (Aconcagua - The Top of the Western World), Mount Kilimanjaro, (Africa 3D), Russia's Mount Elbrus, (unedited), and Carstensz Pyramid, aka Puncak Jaya, (Carstensz Pyramid – 3D Adventure in Irian Jaya).

== Cast ==
=== Climbers ===
The climbers were individuals who had never met each other and came from a variety of backgrounds. Tom Riederer was on the path of the Seven Summits - this would be his fifth, all filmed in 3D. Mike Smith was an athletic mechanic working for Delta Air Lines in Atlanta, Georgia. Gary D. Bacon is a former business executive-turned-adventure-traveler and mountaineer. Steve Ullman was 18 years old at the time of the climb, and had participated in Outward Bound mountaineering school. His grandparents in Massachusetts coincidentally lived next door to Bradford Washburn. Phil Fleet was attempting to join the High Pointers club, summiting the highest point in each of the 50 US states. Denali was his 48th, and most difficult.

=== Guides ===
Guide Kirby Spangler is from Alaska and has years of climbing experience. Rob Gowler is from Jackson, Wyoming, and has guided around the world. Both men were affiliated with the Alaska Mountaineering School/Alaska-Denali Guides and highly skilled for the climb.

=== Physical Training and Preparation ===
As mountain climbing requires high amounts of physical fitness, training is started months in advance.

Preparation of equipment, aside from the camera equipment, was a significant undertaking for each member of the team. A typical gear list has numerous items for climbing and camping in cold and windy weather. Attention also had to be paid to preparation of food.

== Production ==
=== Camera development for extreme environments ===
Thomas Riederer is a Professional Engineer and inventor who developed the camera system used in the filming of Up Denali 3D, which needed to be reliable for the extreme cold weather anticipated by the climb, as well as light, self-contained and portable to allow a month's worth of shooting with no resupply. Advancements from the camera system used for Aconcagua were designed and tested prior to production. A digital video camera with a modification of the NuView 3D lens, which Riederer invented, was selected. Modifications included a heating system to keep the camera operational at filming temperatures down to 35 below zero Fahrenheit, Left eye/Right eye polarization balancing for taming the white glare of the snow, vertical alignment mechanisms to avoid Left eye/Right eye vertical parallax and other optical, electronic and mechanical modifications.

=== Further camera development ===
Based on the filming success of Up Denali 3D and with the subsequent advent of high-definition television, Thomas Riederer developed and patented advanced stereoscopic cameras for observation, entertainment, virtual reality and surgical applications.

=== Filming ===
The film was shot entirely on location, in Denali National Park and in and around Talkeetna, Alaska. Due to extreme crevasse danger on the glacier, the climbers/guides were always roped together in teams of three or four during travel. Higher up the mountain, the steepness and sheer exposure also required roping-up of not only the climbers to each other, but also to the mountain. That required snow protection in the form of snow pickets such that the ropes, and hence climbers, were tied to the mountain to prevent catastrophe should a climber fall. This aspect, though adding to filming difficulty, also gave the production an "up close and personal" feel. Some of the scenes showed the ropes, adding an interesting additional 3D depth cue

To save weight and space in the otherwise 75 lb pack, no tripod was used in the filming, as Thomas Riederer was formerly a competitive pistol shooter with quite steady hands for steady shots.

=== Route ===
The chosen route was the now-ubiquitous West Buttress route, first pioneered by Bradford Washburn in 1951. The route is detailed in a book by Colby Coombs and Bradford Washburn

== Release ==
Due to the lack of suitable 3D display systems in theaters at the time, Up Denali 3D was initially released to local Santa Barbara venues on an informal basis. Portable 3D projection systems were set up by Riederer, and the film was played along with sister tree-D Films productions.

Up Denali 3D was released to a more broad audience in 2004, where it was played with excellent acceptance at the Santa Cruz Film Festival. In 2005, the film was presented at the Marjorie Luke Theater. as part of the Digital Days Film Festival Digital Days is an offshoot of the Santa Barbara International Film Festival, where in February 2004 Riederer's Aconcagua – The Top of the Western World was the first 3D film ever to be played there.

Subsequent screenings were held at the National Stereoscopic Association annual convention in Irving, Texas, in July 2005, Stereoscopic Displays and Applications convention in 2006, West (Sonoma CA) County Film Fest in October 2008, Paso Robles Indie 3D Film Festival in November 2008, and numerous other venues in subsequent years.

== Distribution ==
In 2006, Up Denali 3D was released on DVD in both 2D and Field-Sequential 3D (Active shutter 3D system) formats. The DVD is available through several 3D DVD distributors. In addition, the film is available from 3D content streaming sites. A Blu-ray Disc version is planned, for better compatibility with 3D HDTV systems. Distribution was made to several overseas distributors as well.

== Accolades ==
The Stereo Club of Southern California awarded Up Denali 3D, as well as a sister previous production Alaska 3D: Flora, Fauna & Fishin’ both Honorable Mention medals at its 2005 "The 4th Ever 3D Movie/Video Competition" on July 21, 2005. The judges were Ray Zone, Chris Condon and Dan Symmes, all legendary stalwarts in the stereoscopic film business. Thomas Riederer was present at the awards, and knew the judges well.
