= Triangle of Death =

Triangle of Death may refer to:

== Places ==
- Triangle of Death (Algeria), an area south of Algiers during the Algerian Civil War
- Triangle of Death (Iraq), a term applied by American and coalition forces, during the Iraq War, to a region situated just to the south of the Iraqi capital of Baghdad
- Triangle of death (Italy), an area in southern Italy with an unusual high number of deaths caused by cancer and other diseases, suspected to be caused by illegal dumping of toxic waste
- Triangle of Death, an area in Manchester, United Kingdom, notorious for its gang crime and violence; see Gun crime in south Manchester
- Triangle of Death (Iron Triangle), an area in Council Bluffs, Iowa, known for Union Pacific Railroad's industrial operations, which gained controversy

== Art, entertainment, and media ==
- The Triangle of Death (documentary), 2009 documentary about the Iraq War

== Medicine ==
- Trauma triad of death, the fatal combination of hypothermia, acidosis and coagulopathy
- Danger triangle of the face, an area of the face from which infections can more easily spread to the brain

== See also ==
- American death triangle, a type of rock and ice climbing anchor which magnifies load forces, making it prone to failure
- Ukrainian Death Triangle, a concept in Ukrainian historiography
