= Senator Coffee =

Senator Coffee may refer to:

- Glenn Coffee (born 1967), Oklahoma State Senate
- John T. Coffee (1816–1890), Missouri State Senate
- Richard J. Coffee (1925–2017), New Jersey State Senate
- Max E. Coffey (born 1939), Illinois State Senate
- Michael J. Coffey (1840s–1907), New York State Senate
