= Public journalism =

Public journalism may mean:

- Citizen journalism, journalism as practiced by non-professionals
- Civic journalism, a brand of politically engaged journalism practiced by certain news organizations
