= Stereoscopic Displays and Applications =

Academic technical conference

- Abbreviation: SD&A
- Discipline: Stereoscopic Imaging

Publication details
- Publisher: IS&T
- History: 1990-(ongoing)
- Frequency: annual
- Website: www.stereoscopic.org

Stereoscopic Displays and Applications (SD&A) is an academic technical conference in the field of stereoscopic 3D imaging. The conference started in 1990 and is held annually. The conference is held as part of the annual Electronic Imaging: Science and Technology Symposium organised by the Society for Imaging Science and Technology (IS&T).

== Scope ==
SD&A is an academic technical conference dedicated to stereoscopic imaging topics, specializing in all forms of stereoscopic imaging, including stereoscopic 3D display hardware, stereoscopic 3D image capture, stereoscopic 3D image storage and processing, and also applications of these technologies. As well as including coverage of two-view 3D displays, the conference includes significant coverage of multi-view autostereoscopic displays and volumetric 3D displays - any system that stimulates stereoscopic vision in an observer.

== Overview ==
The backbone of the annual SD&A conference is the technical presentations, which are all accompanied by a technical paper published in the conference proceedings. Alongside the technical sessions, the conference has its own keynote presentation, a popular demonstration session (where a range of stereoscopic 3D technologies can be seen in one place at one time), the 3D theater (where the latest stereoscopic content is shown), and a discussion forum.

== History ==
SD&A was founded in 1990 by John O. Merritt and Scott Fisher, and has been held annually since. Holography pioneer Stephen Benton was also an SD&A conference chair from 2000 until his death in 2003.

From 1990 to 1993, papers from the SD&A conference were published in its own proceedings volume. From 1994, the papers from the SD&A conference were co-published with papers from The Engineering Reality of Virtual Reality conference (which was co-located with SD&A) in a volume series titled Stereoscopic Displays and Virtual Reality Systems. From 2008, SD&A went back to the publication of papers in its own proceedings volume.

Over the period 1990 to 2015, SD&A and the Electronic Imaging Symposium were jointly organized by IS&T and SPIE. From 2016 onwards, SD&A and EI are organized by IS&T.

A detailed listing of the conference program for every year since 1996 is available on the official SD&A website. The Introduction/Preface of every year's conference proceedings also contains a descriptive summary of each conference. The proceedings Introduction is also available on the official SD&A website.

== Proceedings ==
A technical proceedings is published annually containing manuscripts presented at the conference. Over 1100 technical papers have been published over the history of the SD&A conference. The full list of conference proceedings, including a compilation DVD-ROM (1990–2009), is listed at the official SD&A website.

The DVD-ROM compilation "Stereoscopic Displays and Applications 1990-2009: A Complete 20-Year Retrospective - and The Engineering Reality of Virtual Reality 1994-2009 (CDP51)" released in 2010 represents a technical knowledge base across stereoscopic 3D and VR topics containing the complete technical record of the Stereoscopic Displays and Applications conference (1990-2009), The Engineering Reality of Virtual Reality conference (1994-2009), and papers from a selection of ten other 3D related SPIE conferences (1977-1989) predating SD&A. The disc contains 1260 individual technical papers – 816 from the Stereoscopic Displays and Applications conference, 223 from The Engineering Reality of Virtual Reality conference, and 221 papers from the SPIE 3D conferences prior to SD&A.

Some of the presentations at the SD&A conference have been, or go onto be, published in the Journal of Electronic Imaging. From 1990 to 2015, the SD&A proceedings were published as part of the Proceedings of SPIE series. From 2016 the SD&A proceedings are published by IS&T and will be available open-access.

== Citation statistics ==
Papers presented at SD&A are cited extensively. The conference tracks its citations via custom Google Scholar page. As of September 2019, the total citation count is 22k - which is almost double the citation count from January 2014 (12,371). As of January 2014, the top ten most-cited papers across first 25 years of SD&A are:

Rank	Title	Author(s)	Year	Citations
1.	"Depth-image-based rendering (DIBR), compression, and transmission for a new approach on 3D-TV"	Christoph Fehn	2004	704
2.	"Image distortions in stereoscopic video systems"	Andrew J. Woods, Tom Docherty, Rolf Koch	1993	417
3.	"Perceptual issues in augmented reality"	David Drascic, Paul Milgram	1996	237
4.	"Controlling perceived depth in stereoscopic images"	Graham R. Jones, Delman Lee, Nicolas S. Holliman, David Ezra	2001	156
5.	"Variation and extrema of human interpupillary distance"	Neil A. Dodgson	2004	147
6.	"Image preparation for 3D LCD"	Cees van Berkel	1999	122
7.	"Effect of disparity and motion on visual comfort of stereoscopic images"	Filippo Speranza, Wa J. Tam, Ron Renaud, Namho Hur	2006	100
8.	"Geometry of binocular imaging"	Victor S. Grinberg, Gregg W. Podnar, Mel Siegel	1994	99
9.	"Viewpoint-dependent stereoscopic display using interpolation of multiviewpoint images"	Akihiro Katayama, Koichiro Tanaka, Takahiro Oshino, Hideyuki Tamura	1995	92
10.	"Rapid 2D-to-3D conversion"	Philip V. Harman, Julien Flack, Simon Fox, Mark Dowley	2002	90

== Reporting ==
Various media outlets have reported on research presented at SD&A and on the conference itself. Outlets include:

- Tech magazines: Scientific American, Photonics Spectra, Third Dimension Newsletter.
- Tech News sites: CNET, Display Daily.
- Books: "3D Movie Making".
- Academic Journals: The Photogrammetric Record.

See also Citation Statistics above.
