= John Merritt =

John Merritt may refer to:

- John Merritt (baseball) (1894–1955), outfielder in Major League Baseball
- John Merritt (editor) (1920–1999), English film editor
- John Merritt (American football) (1926–1983), American football coach
- John Merritt (public servant) (born 1959), Victorian public servant
- John O. Merritt (fl. 1970s–2000s), stereoscopy expert
