= Anchor (climbing) =

Equipment used for attaching climber or a rope to a fixed point

In rock climbing, an anchor can be any device or method for attaching a climber, rope, or load to a climbing surface—typically rock, ice, steep dirt, or a building—either permanently or temporarily. The intention of an anchor is case-specific but is usually for fall protection, primarily fall arrest and fall restraint. Climbing anchors are also used for hoisting, holding static loads, or redirecting (also called deviating) a rope.

== Types ==
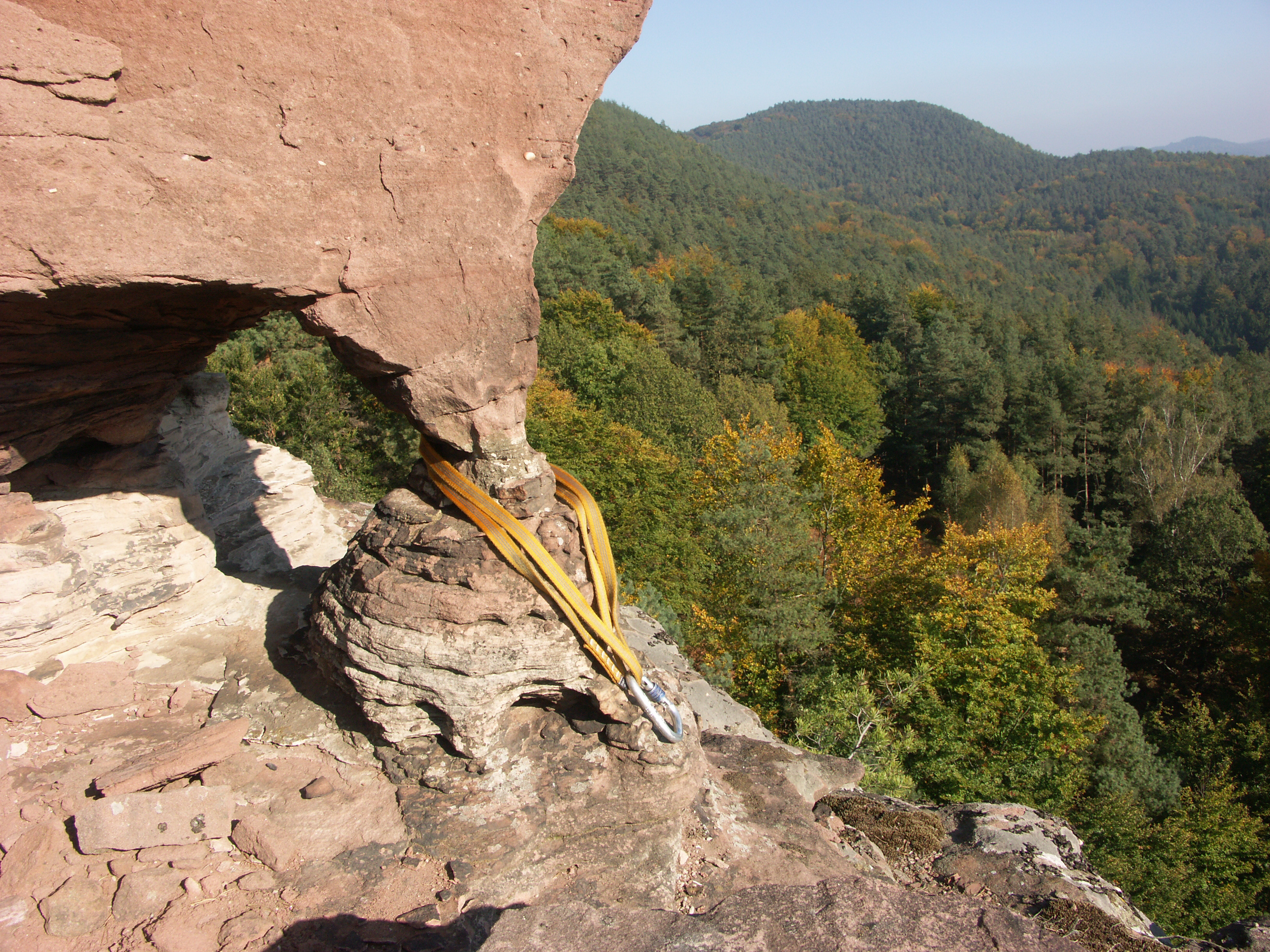
Natural protection – a basket hitch made from a sling, attached to a handle.

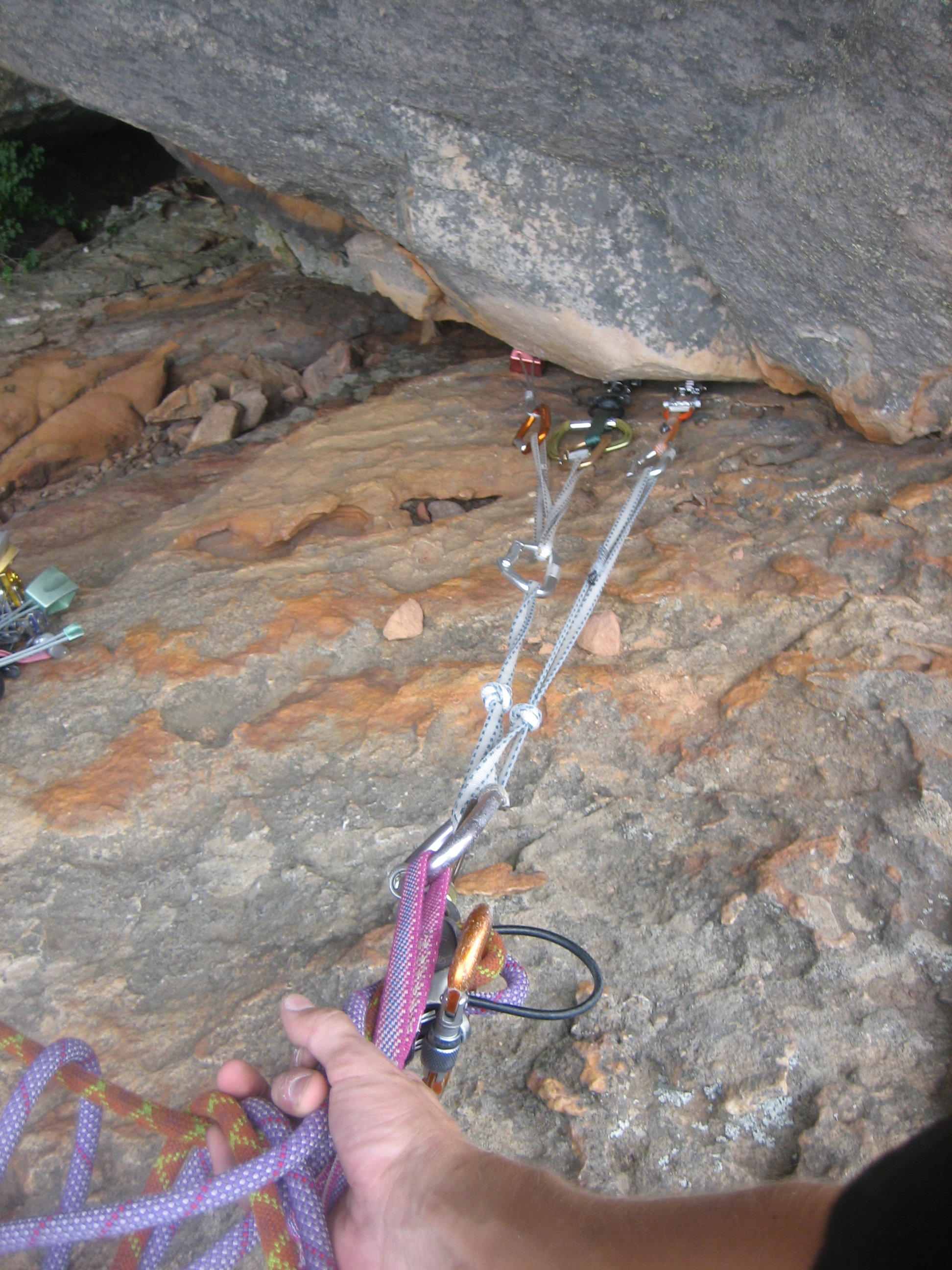
An artificial climbing anchor consisting of a hex and two cams, equalized with slings.

A snow picket.

Depending on the surface being climbed, there are many types of protection that can be used to construct an anchor, including natural protection such as boulders and trees, or artificial protection such as cams, nuts, bolts or pitons.

=== Natural ===
A natural anchor is a secure natural feature that can serve as a climbing anchor by attaching a sling, lanyard, or cordelette and a carabiner. Examples of natural anchors include trees, boulders, lodged chockstones, horns, icicles, and protrusions.

=== Artificial ===
An artificial anchor consists of man-made climbing gear placed in the rock. Such gear includes spring-loaded camming devices, aluminum nuts used like chockstones, steel expansion bolts, and pitons. Artificial anchors may be permanent or removable.

=== Belay ===
A belay anchor is used as a sole attachment to the cliff face, to support a belay or top rope. Ideally, it should consist of multiple redundant components (natural and/or artificial), none of which are likely to fail, and none of which in the event of failure would cause the entire anchor to fail. Any component of a good anchor should be able to support the entire system by itself.

=== Running belay ===
A running belay anchor is used as a safeguard in the event of a fall while lead climbing. The leader and follower climb simultaneously with protection placed in between. When the two climbers advance using a running belay, the belay is almost as secure as using a belay device and anchors because if the leader falls, all the slack is already out of the rope and the follower acts as a counterweight to catch the fall. A running belay is used as a faster alternative to pitch-climbing when the risk, consequences, and likelihood of a leader fall are deemed to be acceptable.

=== Ice ===
The snow picket is used as an anchor in mountaineering. It is driven into the snow and used to arrest falls. Snow pickets can also be placed horizontally in snow as a deadman, which provides a secure anchor to abseil on. Ice screws can be hand-driven into solid ice and are the equivalent of cams or nuts when ice climbing. Ice can also be protected using an Abalakov thread or v-thread. Because of the uncertain holding power of ice protection, it is sometimes attached to the rope using a load-absorbing sling or quickdraw, designed to reduce the load on protection by extending in case of a fall.

== Attaching ==
=== Indirect ===
When the rope goes from the climber to the belayer. Most often used under controlled circumstances at climbing walls or when the climber doesn't have the weight advantage on the belayer during bottom-roped climbs. It is impossible to escape from the system.

=== Semi-direct ===
When the rope comes from the climber to the belayer, the belayer is attached separately to an anchor. Often used when multi-pitching and the belayer is on a stance. Or when top roping and it is possible that if the climber falls the belayer will be pulled from the stance above the climber. The belayer can, with a little effort then remove themselves from the system if required. It is essential that the belayer is attached to the anchor via the belay loop at the front of the harness. Attaching the harness of the belayer to the anchor via the back of the harness can cause the harness, when placed under strain, to constrict inwards elongating front to back, rather than side to side. This can result in a crushed pelvis and serious harm to the belayer.

=== Direct ===
When the rope comes from the climber to an anchor. a hanging belay device may be used, although it is common in this instance to just use an Italian hitch. The belayer is totally free of the system.

== Considerations ==
=== Force-multipliers ===
The force on an anchor may be much greater than the weight of the climber. There are various mechanisms that contribute to excess force, including

- Direction of pull, or vector pulling
- Fall factor (if a fall occurs)
- Stiffness (reduced elasticity) of the climbing rope and anchor materials
- improper slippage through the belay device
- A swinging climber, or load.
- Cam-action type anchors (including nuts, and hexes)

== Load-sharing ==
A load-sharing (or load-distributing) anchor is a system consisting of two or more individual anchors which join at a main anchor point to form an anchoring system. This configuration is a way to introduce redundancy and increase strength, typically for a belay anchor. If assembled correctly, the load will be distributed to each individual anchor, rather than placing all the load on a single anchor point. This decreases the chance that any single anchor point will fail, and, if a point does fail, the other(s) should still be able to hold.

=== Best practices ===
To ensure proper redundancy and effectiveness of a load-sharing anchor, some best practices are commonly observed.

==== Redundancy ====
Anchors should be redundant, meaning that the overall anchor will still be sufficiently strong if any individual anchor were to fail. Selecting independent locations for the individual anchors would make an anchor redundant. This may mean using distinct boulders, crack systems, or objects for the placement location of each individual anchor. That being said, redundancy is not necessary in all climbing anchors. A living tree that is at least 15 centimetres (6 inches) in diameter will surely hold up several kilonewtons of force in any direction, and so is sufficient as being the sole anchor for any climbing anchor.

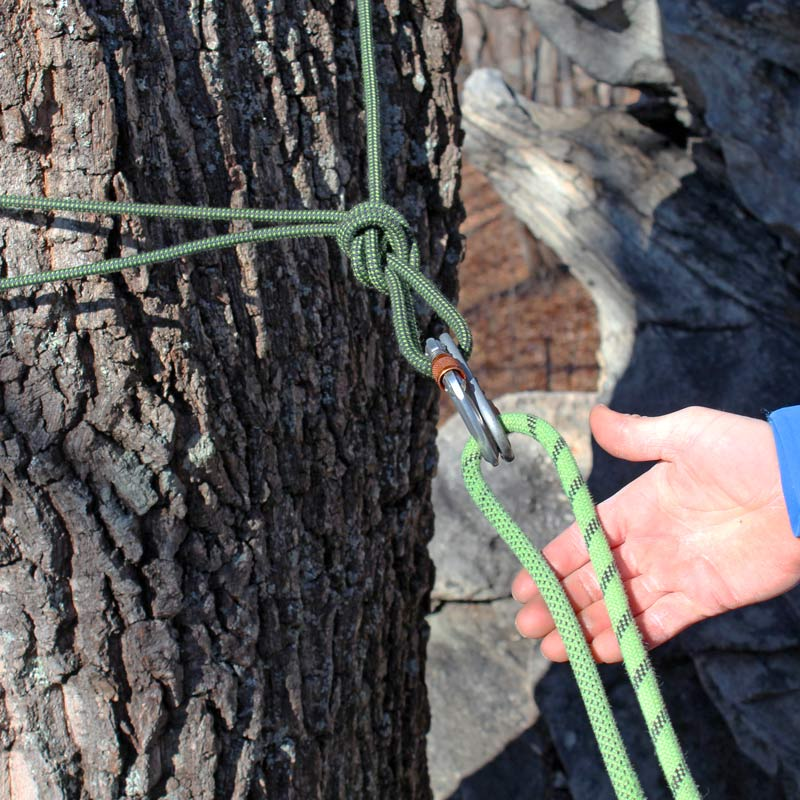
A large (> 15 cm or 6 in diameter) and living tree is a natural anchor that is not redundant but still very strong.

==== Equalization ====
In a load-sharing anchor, each individual anchor is connected to a main anchor point. The load-sharing anchor is said to be equalized if the load force is distributed equally to each individual anchor. This is accomplished by adjusting the length of each connecting member (between the main anchor point and an individual anchor) while pulling the main anchor in the anticipated direction of the load. Anchors can be either pre-equalized, in which the anchor is statically equalized between anchor points during rigging, or self-equalizing, in which the anchor system dynamically adjusts tension between anchor points during use.

==== Non-extension ====
A load-sharing anchor which does not extend in the event of an individual anchor failure has the property of non-extension. This important feature reduces the potential for shock-loading the remaining individual anchors during a failure. Non-extension can be accomplished by tying an appropriate knot in the interconnecting cordelette, or by using individual slings for equalization. The principle of non-extension refers to the mitigation of shock-loading, rather than the elongation of materials under an increased load.

The principle of minimum swing is related to non-extension. The main anchor point in a well-constructed load-sharing anchor will neither extend nor swing in the event of an individual anchor failure. Reducing swing can be accomplished by minimizing the inner angle between individual anchors, and by increasing the number of individual anchors. An additional technique is to place a directional anchor a short distance below the main anchor point.

=== Inner angle ===
Equalization of a load-sharing anchor, showing force distribution with a V-angle of 90°

When constructing a load-sharing anchor, it is important to take into consideration the angle formed between each individual anchor – the V-angle. Climbers typically try to minimize this angle, because a greater V-angle will produce more force at each individual anchor.

If the V-angle is greater than 120 degrees, the load on each individual anchor will be greater than the load on the rope. Angles in excess of 120 degrees can create a hazardous situation that compromises the safety of the anchor, and should generally be avoided.

The sum of forces on all the individual anchors will commonly exceed 100%, and in some cases, the force on an individual anchor will be greater than the load. This may seem contradictory when only the magnitudes are summed. However, if the forces on the individual anchors are added as vectors, the resultant force on the anchor system is equal to the load. In simpler terms, the forces in the vertical direction are equal to the load force, but there are lateral forces as well – which increase as the V-angle increases.

The force on each individual anchor is given by:

$$F_\text{anchor} = \frac{ F_\text{load} }{ 2 \cos( \theta_\text{V} / 2 ) }$$.

where,

- $F_\text{load}$ is the overall load force.
- $\theta_\text{V}$ represents the V-angle.

This equation is a special case representation of the more general anchor force equation, in which the load-sharing anchor is constructed from two symmetrically placed anchors.

From this expression, the anchor forces can be calculated for selected angles in a two-element, symmetrical, load-sharing anchor.

- At a V-angle of 30 degrees, each of the two anchors will bear a force of about 52% of the original load.
- At 45 degrees, each anchor bears 54% of the load.
- At 60 degrees, each anchor bears 58% of the load.
- At 90 degrees, each anchor bears 71% of the load.
- At 120 degrees, each anchor bears a force equivalent to 100% of the original load. An angle this large should be avoided for safe climbing.

In trad climbing belay stations, load-sharing anchors are often constructed from more than two individual anchors, which are rarely co-planar. In these cases, each individual anchor would feel a reduced force from the above values, but the best practice is to reduce the angle between the two outermost elements and avoid angles in excess of 120 degrees.

== See also ==
- Piton
- American death triangle
