= Billy C. Clark =

American writer (1928–2009)

Billy Curtis Clark (December 19, 1928 – March 15, 2009) was an American author of 11 books and many poems and short stories, heavily influenced by his childhood growing up in poverty in Kentucky.

== Biography ==
Clark was born December 29, 1928, and grew up in Catlettsburg in Eastern Kentucky during the Great Depression; he was a second cousin of writer Jesse Stuart. He had three brothers and four sisters, and was born to a mother who would wash clothes for extra income, while his father was a shoemaker who bragged of having made it to the second grade. He was living on his own by the time he was 11 years old, doing work to pay for high school, while living in a courthouse building. He would put out miles of trotlines and set traps to catch animals, drying the skins of the animals he caught on the courthouse's clock and selling the furs to make a living.

He enlisted in the military and served during the Korean War following his graduation from high school. After completing military service, he enrolled at the University of Kentucky, becoming the first member of his family to earn a college degree.

=== Writing ===
Clark claimed to have his first work published when he was 14 years old and a collaborative effort was underway at the time of his death to publish pieces he had written while in college together with the Jesse Stuart Foundation, to be called A Heap of Hills. The foundation has reissued eight of Clark's books that had been originally published by G. P. Putnam's Sons and Thomas Y. Crowell Co.

Reviewer Hal Borland in The New York Times describes the "ballad-like quality" of his 1960 autobiographical book A Long Row to Hoe, that tells the story of his life up to age 19, growing up in a community that "had more than its share of 'river trash', drunks [and] derelicts" in which the developments of electric lights and indoor plumbing did not "put an end to frontier crudeness and backwater characters". The review laments the structure of the book, but describes it as a "good story, rich in character and details, larded with anecdote and legend". The book was selected by Time magazine as one of its best books of that year, describing it "as authentically American as Huckleberry Finn". Many colleges and universities use the book to introduce students to the culture of Appalachia and its culture and the Library of Congress selected it to be recorded on a talking record for the blind. Mark Daniel Merritt composed the score of River Dreams a musical adaptation of A Long Road to Hoe. The play was written by Betty Peterson, an English professor who had been a student of Clark's at Somerset Community College in Kentucky, where Clark taught for a few years.

Platt and Monk included his Trail of the Hunter's Horn in a 1964 anthology of 30 Greatest Dog Stories that also included Call of the Wild by Jack London as well as John Steinbeck's Travels With Charley. The Book of the Month Club offered as a selection his book The Champion of Sourwood Mountain.

A mule named Kate would follow Clark and his friends to school. After the mule was arrested for trespassing, he and his classmates collected enough money to get the animal released on bail. Walt Disney Studios purchased the rights to his book about the mule, titled Goodbye Kate, which has yet to be made into a film by the time of Clark's death.

The University of Tennessee Press published his novel By Way of the Forked Stick in September 2000.

Clark was selected as writer-in-residence at Longwood University, after spending 18 years at the University of Kentucky in that role as a full professor. He was the founder and editor of Virginia Writing.

=== Personal ===
The Billy C. Clark Bridge, which crosses the Big Sandy River on U.S. Route 60 to connect Kentucky and Kenova, West Virginia, was named for him in 1992.

Clark died at age 80 on March 15, 2009, at his home in Farmville, Virginia.
