= The Imaging Science Journal =

Journal

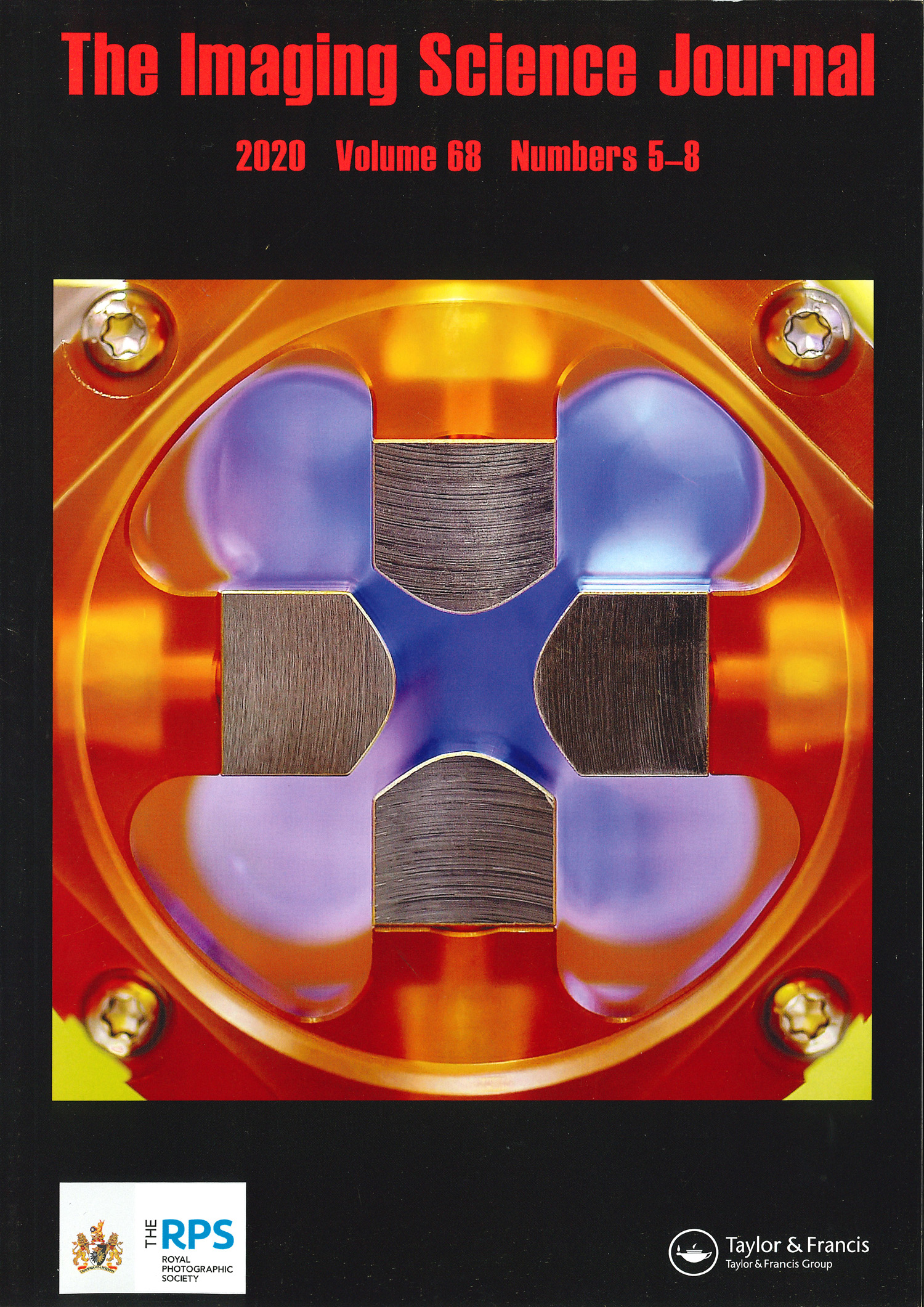
- The Imaging Science Journal cover v.68 (2020), nos 5-8 (July-December)
- Discipline: Computer science, Optics, Imaging
- Language: English
- Edited by: Ricardo Vardasca

Publication details
- Former name(s): The Journal of Photographic Science
- History: 1953–present
- Publisher: Taylor & Francis (United Kingdom)
- Frequency: Bimonthly
- Impact factor: 1.1 (2023)

Standard abbreviations
- ISO 4: Imaging Sci. J.

Indexing
- ISSN: 1368-2199

Links
- Journal homepage

The Imaging Science Journal, formerly The Journal of Photographic Science, is a bimonthly peer-reviewed scientific journal covering both fundamental and applied aspects of imaging, including conventional, analogue chemical, electronic, digital and hybrid imaging systems. It is an official journal of the Royal Photographic Society and published by Taylor & Francis, previously published by Maney Publishing. The journal was established in 1953. The current editor-in-chief is Professor Ricardo Vardasca, from ISLA Santarém, Portugal.

== History ==
The Photographic Society of London, which became the Royal Photographic Society in 1894, was formed in 1853 ‘to promote the art and science of photography’ and it delivered on this through its membership, external engagement, public exhibitions, meetings and a printed journal. In the nineteenth century the RPS’s Journal reported on developments in new chemistry usually from amateur experimenters, and in areas such as optics and technology. Later in the century, as the Society itself moved away from art photography and gave a greater focus on photographic science, through the influence of a series of ‘science’ orientated Presidents, the Journal grew as a means of reporting on developments in this area.

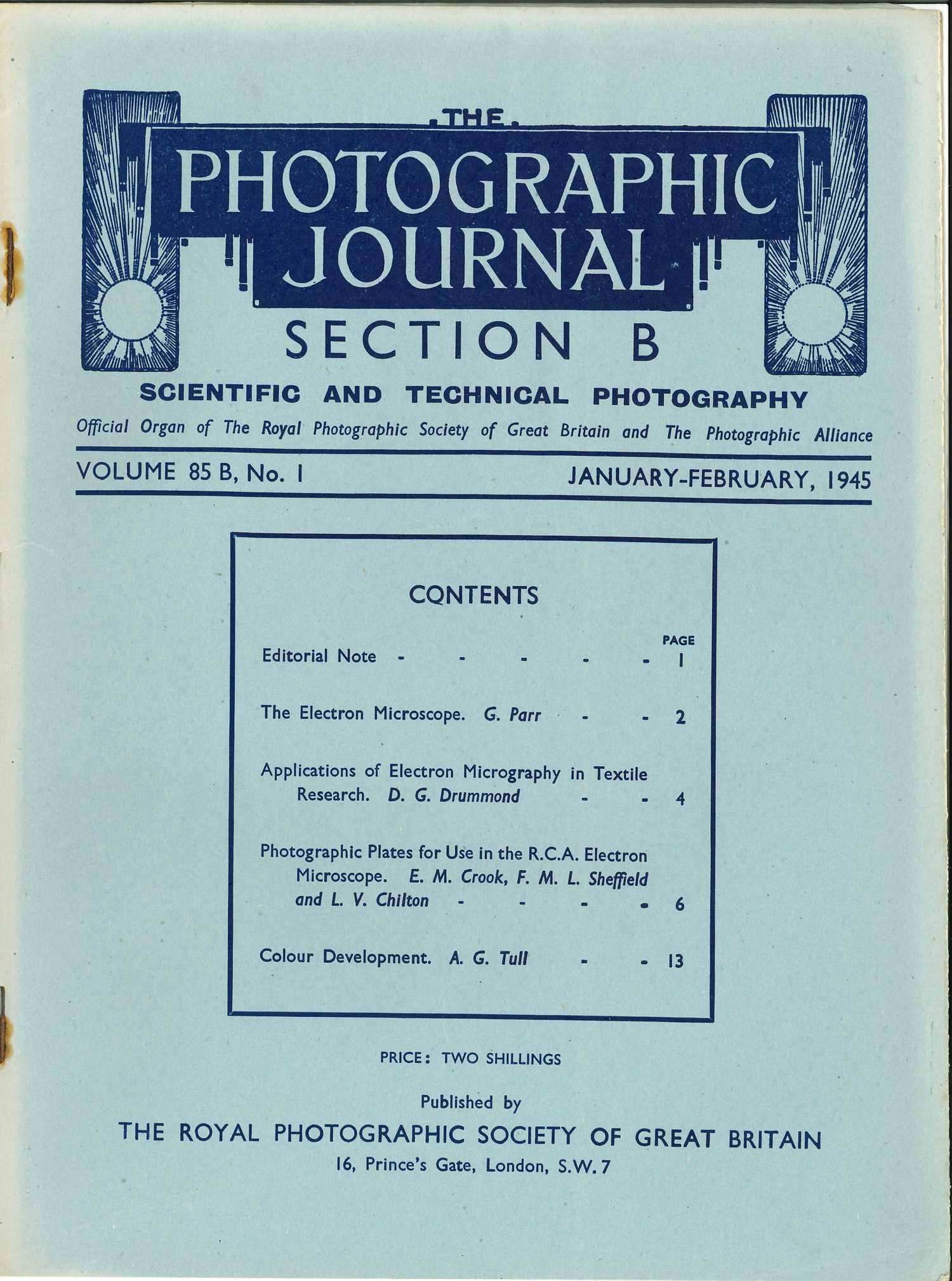
Section B of The Photographic Journal volume 85 no. 1 1945 cover of the first issue.

After the second world war, as the RPS’s membership grew and became more general in its interests, there was a perceived need to separate the scientific content from the more general papers in the main Journal. In 1944 the decision was taken to separate the scientific matter into a new Section B of the Journal, with the first number appearing from Jan/Feb 1945. Section A continued to publish more general features on pictorial photography, reports of members’ meetings, and Society business. An editorial note in the first issue of Section B stated: For some time it has been apparent that the inclusion in The Photographic Journal of purely scientific papers with papers of pictorial or general interest is unsatisfactory both to the pictorial photographer and to the photographic technologist. It has therefore been decided to divide the Journal into two parts: Section A which will contain articles on pictorial and general subjects, and Section B which will contain papers and other matter of purely scientific and technical application.

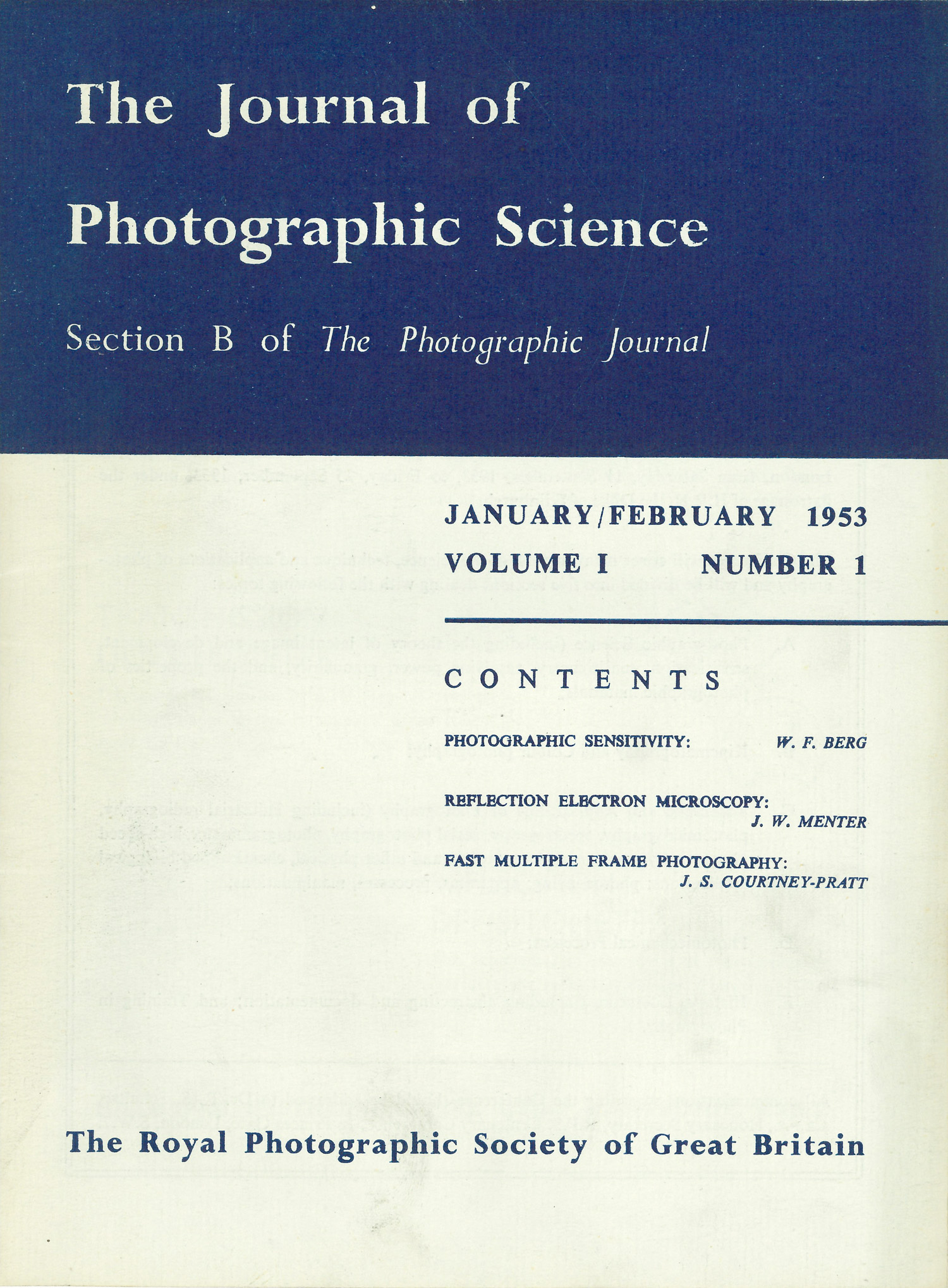
Journal of Photographic Science v1 n1 1953 cover of the first issue.

Section B became a separate publication and was renamed the Journal of Photographic Science in 1953, published by the RPS. This remained the case until the 1990s when the Society subcontracted publication to a third party. Today, this role is undertaken by Taylor and Francis, coincidentally the original printer of the RPS’s 1853 Journal.

The RPS maintains a run of the Imaging Science Journal and its predecessors at its headquarters in Bristol which are available for public consultation. The Imaging Science Journal has been digitised and is available to subscribers.
