= Imaging =

Representation or reproduction of an object's form

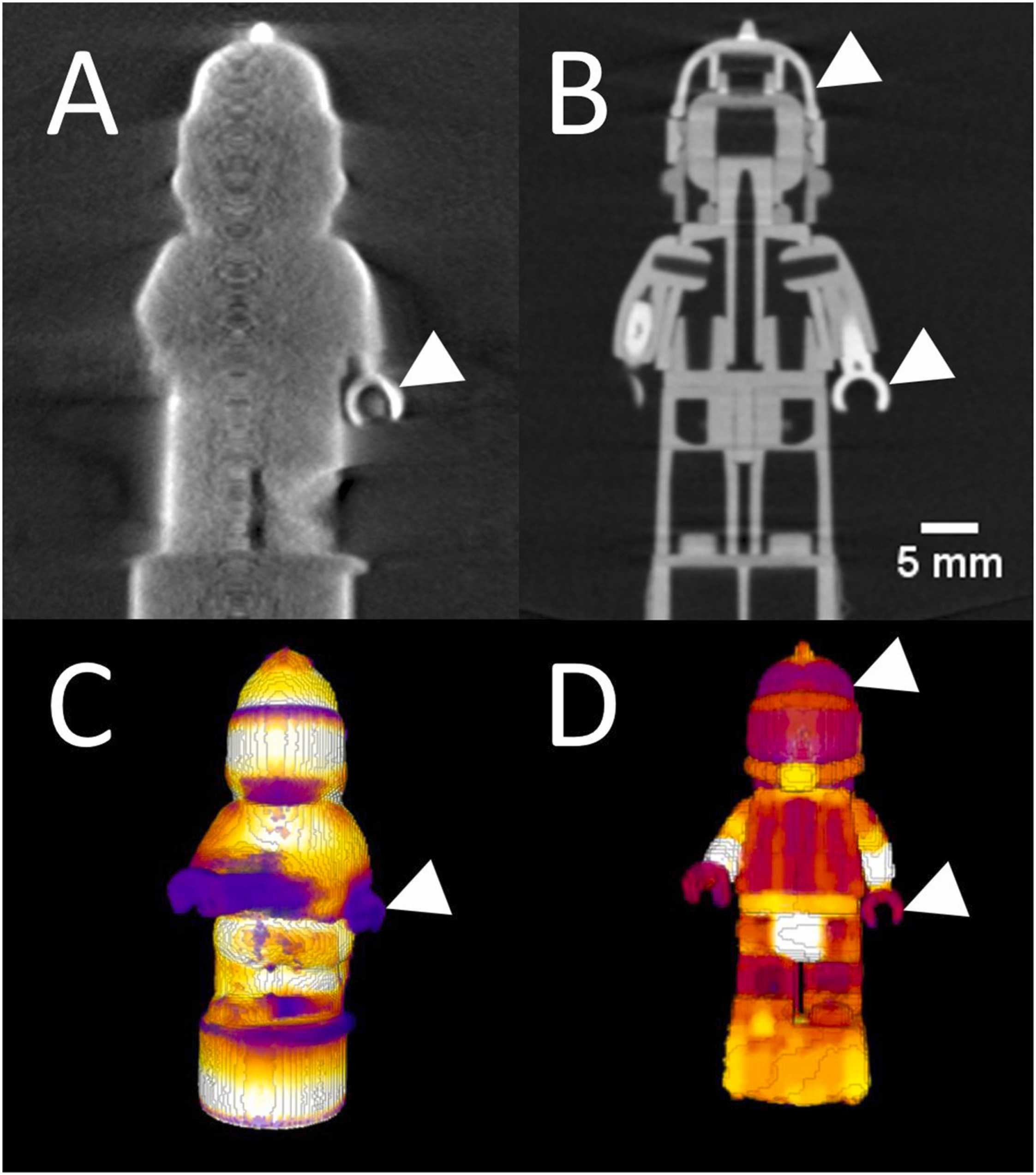
Comparison of two imaging modalities, optical tomography (A, C) and computed tomography (B, D), as applied to a Lego minifigure

Imaging is the process of creating visual representations of objects, scenes, or phenomena. The term encompasses both the formation of images through physical processes and the technologies used to capture, store, process, and display them. While traditional imaging relies on visible light, modern imaging systems can visualize information across the electromagnetic spectrum and through other physical phenomena such as sound waves, magnetic fields, and particle emissions, enabling the visualization of subjects invisible to the human eye.

Imaging science or imaging science and technology is the multidisciplinary field concerned with the theoretical foundations and practical applications of image creation and analysis. The field draws on physics, mathematics, electrical engineering, computer science, computer vision, and perceptual psychology to develop systems that generate, collect, duplicate, analyze, modify, and visualize images.

== Principles ==
=== The imaging chain ===
The imaging chain is a conceptual framework describing the interconnected components of any imaging system. Understanding each link in this chain allows engineers and scientists to optimize system performance for specific applications.

The chain begins with the subject and its observable properties, typically energy that is emitted, reflected, or transmitted. A light source or other energy source may illuminate the subject to make these properties detectable. The capture device then collects this energy using appropriate sensors: optical systems for electromagnetic radiation, transducers for acoustic waves, or antenna arrays for radio frequencies. In digital systems, a processor converts the captured signals into a format suitable for rendering, applying algorithms for noise reduction, enhancement, or reconstruction. Finally, a display renders the processed information as a visible image on media such as paper, screens, or projection surfaces. Throughout this process, the characteristics of the human visual system inform design decisions, as the ultimate purpose of most imaging systems is to convey information to human observers.

=== Coherent and non-coherent imaging ===
Imaging systems are often classified by whether they use coherent or non-coherent illumination. Coherent imaging employs an active source that produces waves with a consistent phase relationship, as in radar, synthetic aperture radar, medical ultrasound, and optical coherence tomography. These systems can capture phase information in addition to amplitude, enabling techniques such as holography and interferometry. Non-coherent imaging systems, including conventional photography, fluorescence microscopy, and telescopes, rely on illumination sources where light waves have random phase relationships.

== Methods and applications ==
Imaging methods span a wide range of physical principles, each suited to particular applications.

Optical imaging encompasses photography, cinematography, microscopy, and telescopic observation. These methods capture electromagnetic radiation in or near the visible spectrum and form the basis of most consumer and scientific imaging. Extensions include thermography, which visualizes infrared radiation to reveal temperature distributions, and multispectral imaging, which captures data across multiple wavelength bands for applications in remote sensing and materials analysis.

Medical imaging comprises techniques designed to visualize the interior of the human body for diagnostic and therapeutic purposes. Radiography and computed tomography use X-rays to image dense structures such as bone. Magnetic resonance imaging exploits nuclear magnetic properties to produce detailed soft-tissue images without ionizing radiation. Ultrasound imaging uses high-frequency sound waves and is particularly valuable for real-time imaging and fetal monitoring. Nuclear medicine techniques such as positron emission tomography track radioactive tracers to reveal metabolic activity. Emerging modalities include photoacoustic imaging, which combines optical and acoustic principles, and Magneto-acousto-electrical tomography, which map electrical conductivity in biological tissues.

Acoustic imaging uses sound waves to create images. Beyond medical ultrasound, applications include sonar for underwater navigation and mapping, seismic imaging for geological exploration, and industrial non-destructive testing.

Radar and microwave imaging employs radio waves to detect and image objects. Synthetic aperture radar produces high-resolution images from aircraft or satellites regardless of weather or lighting conditions, making it essential for Earth observation and reconnaissance. Ground-penetrating radar images subsurface structures for archaeological and engineering applications.

Electron and particle imaging use beams of electrons or other particles to achieve resolutions far beyond the diffraction limit of visible light. Electron microscopes can image individual atoms, enabling advances in materials science and structural biology.

Chemical imaging combines spectroscopy with spatial imaging to map the chemical composition of samples, with applications in pharmaceutical development, food safety, and forensics.

LIDAR (Light Detection and Ranging) measures distances using laser pulses to create three-dimensional representations of surfaces and objects, widely used in autonomous vehicles, topographic mapping, and forestry.

Computational and digital imaging encompasses image processing, computer graphics, three-dimensional rendering, and digital image restoration. Computer vision applies algorithmic analysis to extract information from images automatically.

== History ==
Photography and imaging have always been intertwined. When Joseph Nicéphore Niépce created the first permanent photograph using heliography in 1826, and Louis Daguerre refined the process into the daguerreotype a decade later, they weren't just inventing a new art form, they were laying the groundwork for an entire scientific discipline built on silver halide chemistry.

For most of the nineteenth century, photography remained the province of specialists. That changed with George Eastman's Kodak camera, introduced in 1888 with the slogan "You press the button, we do the rest." Suddenly, anyone could take pictures. Around the same time, Wilhelm Röntgen stumbled onto X-rays in 1895, an accident that would spawn the entire field of medical imaging.

World War II proved to be a turning point. Radar technology, developed frantically on both sides of the conflict, introduced concepts that engineers would later adapt for synthetic aperture radar and medical ultrasound. Then the charge-coupled device came: Willard Boyle and George E. Smith built the first one at Bell Labs in 1969, and within a few decades it had made film nearly obsolete. Magnetic resonance imaging arrived in the 1970s, offering doctors something X-rays never could, detailed views of soft tissue without any radiation.

Digital cameras took over fast. By the 2000s, film was already in decline; by the 2010s, smartphones greatly increased accessibility to cameras. Features that once required experience to make noteworthy decisions about the photo, (exposure, focus, color) all became automatic.

Today, billions of photos get uploaded to social media every day. As a result, a growing issue is that generative AI can fabricate photorealistic images from scratch. It is becoming more difficult to differentiate an artificially synthesized image from one that was captured or drawn by a person.

== See also ==
- Image processing
- Image sensor
- Medical imaging
- Remote sensing
- Computer vision
- Photography
- Society for Imaging Science and Technology
- The Imaging Science Journal
