= John O. Merritt =

- Born: November 3, 1939
- Died: July 9, 2021 (aged 81)
- Known for: Scientist

John O. Merritt was an expert in the applications of stereoscopic 3D displays and remote-presence systems.

He was a Fellow of SPIE and co-chaired the annual SPIE/IS&T Conference on Stereoscopic Displays and Applications since co-founding it in 1990. He taught, together with Andrew Woods, a short course on "Stereoscopic Display Application Issues" each year at the annual Stereoscopic Displays and Applications conference. He also co-chaired the IS&T/SPIE 2002 Electronic Imaging: Science and Technology Symposium.

He was the author of over 60 technical reports and papers in topics related to vision and simulation. Topics he worked on include telerobotics, medical imaging and military off-road mobility.

He was the Chief Technology Officer of The Merritt Group.

Merritt died in July 2021 at age 81.

== Published work ==
Merritt wrote, co-authored, and published many works across many fields of study. These include, but are not limited to:

- (1990-2009) Co-editor of all 20 proceedings volumes of the Stereoscopic Displays and Applications conference (1990-2009) co-published by SPIE and IS&T:
  - Stereoscopic Displays and Applications (1990) Proc. SPIE Vol. 1256
  - Stereoscopic Displays and Applications II (1991) Proc. SPIE Vol. 1457
  - Stereoscopic Displays and Applications III (1992) Proc. SPIE Vol. 1669
  - Stereoscopic Displays and Applications IV (1993) Proc. SPIE Vol. 1915
  - Stereoscopic Displays and Virtual Reality Systems (1994) Proc. SPIE Vol. 2177
  - Stereoscopic Displays and Virtual Reality Systems II (1995) Proc. SPIE Vol. 2409
  - Stereoscopic Displays and Virtual Reality Systems III (1996) Proc. SPIE Vol. 2653
  - Stereoscopic Displays and Virtual Reality Systems IV (1997) Proc. SPIE Vol. 3012
  - Stereoscopic Displays and Virtual Reality Systems V (1998) Proc. SPIE Vol. 3295
  - Stereoscopic Displays and Virtual Reality Systems VI (1999) Proc. SPIE Vol. 3639
  - Stereoscopic Displays and Virtual Reality Systems VII (2000) Proc. SPIE Vol. 3957
  - Stereoscopic Displays and Virtual Reality Systems VIII (2001) Proc. SPIE Vol. 4297
  - Stereoscopic Displays and Virtual Reality Systems IX (2002) Proc. SPIE Vol. 4660
  - Stereoscopic Displays and Virtual Reality Systems X (2003) Proc. SPIE Vol. 5006
  - Stereoscopic Displays and Virtual Reality Systems XI (2004) Proc. SPIE Vol. 5291
  - Stereoscopic Displays and Virtual Reality Systems XII (2005) Proc. SPIE Vol. 5664
  - Stereoscopic Displays and Virtual Reality Systems XIII (2006) Proc. SPIE Vol. 6055
  - Stereoscopic Displays and Virtual Reality Systems XIV (2007) Proc. SPIE Vol. 6490
  - Stereoscopic Displays and Applications XIX (2008) Proc. SPIE Vol. 6803
  - Stereoscopic Displays and Applications XX (2009) Proc. SPIE Vol. 7237 (in press)
- Merritt J.O., CuQlock-Knopp, G., Paicopolis, P., Smoot, J., Kregel, M., Corona, B., (2006) Binocular depth acuity research to support the Modular Multi-Spectral Stereoscopic Night Vision Goggle. in Proceedings of the SPIE Defense and Security Symposium 11th Annual Conference on "Helmet- and Head-Mounted Displays X: Technologies and Applications. Vol, 6224, 622403.
- Merritt, J.O., CuQlock-Knopp, G., & Myles, K., (1997) Enhanced perception of terrain hazards in off-road path choice: stereo 3D versus 2D displays in SPIE's 11th Annual International Symposium on Aerospace/Defense Sensing, Simulation, and Control. Proc. SPIE Vol. 3062, pp. 101–104, ORLANDO, FL.
- Merritt J.O., (1982) The Effect of Wide-angle Headlight Illumination on Driver Performance, Human Factors Research, Incorporated, United States National Highway Traffic Safety Administration. Published by U.S. National Highway Traffic Safety Administration.
- Pepper, R., Cole, R., Merritt, J., Smith, D. (1978) Operator performance using conventional or stereo video displays, Optical Engineering, 17:4:411-415, July/August 1978.
- Merritt, J.O. (1978) Driver Visibility Quality: An Electro-optical Meter for In-vehicle Measurement of Modulation Transfer (MTF), United States National Highway Traffic Safety Administration, National Highway Traffic Safety Administration, United States. Published by National Technical Information Service.

== See also ==
- IS&T/SPIE Stereoscopic Displays and Applications conference (official conference website: www.stereoscopic.org)
