= Senator Merritt =

Senator Merritt may refer to:

- Alice Merritt (1876–1950), Connecticut State Senate
- Jim Merritt (American politician) (born 1959), Indiana State Senate
- Matthew F. Merritt (1815–1896), Connecticut State Senate
- Nikki Merritt (born 1972), Georgia State Senate
- Samuel Augustus Merritt (1827–1910), California State Senate
- Tom Merritt (politician) (1911–1991), Illinois State Senate
