= Thomas Merritt =

Thomas Merritt may refer to:

- Thomas Merritt (composer) (1863–1908), organist and composer of Christmas carols
- Thomas Rodman Merritt (1824–1906), businessman and political figure in Upper Canada, later Ontario
- Tom Merritt (born 1970), technology journalist, writer, and broadcaster
- Tom Merritt (politician) (1911–1991), member of the Illinois Senate
- Tommy Merritt (born 1948), member of the Texas House of Representatives
