= George Merritt =

George Merritt may refer to:

- George Merritt (businessman) (1807–1873), businessman from New York
- George Merritt (actor) (1890–1977), British film and television actor
- George Merritt (baseball) (1880–1938), outfielder in Major League Baseball
- Whitey Merritt (George Henry Merrit, 1869–1916), Canadian ice hockey goaltender
