= Edwin Merritt =

Edwin Merritt may refer to:

- Edwin Atkins Merritt (1828–1916), Civil War general and collector of the port of New York
- Edwin Albert Merritt (1860–1914), his son, Congressman from New York
