= W. Davis Merritt =

American newspaper editor

W. Davis "Buzz" Merritt Jr. was an American newspaper editor. He was editor of The Wichita Eagle from 1975 to 1998. He is considered one of the fathers of public journalism, a reform movement that urged journalists to do their jobs in ways that could help citizens engage in public life rather than discouraging them. A major component of public journalism is to train journalists to view events from the citizen's perspective rather than that of the participants in the news. Merritt is the author of four books on journalism, "Public Journalism and Public Life," "The Two W's of Journalism" (with Maxwell McCombs), Knightfall: Knight Ridder and How the Erosion of Newspaper Journalism Is Putting Democracy at Risk, a critique of corporate ownership of newspapers that reserves its most pointed criticism for Knight Ridder, the company that owned The Wichita Eagle and his employer for 43 years and his latest book, "On Life, Liberty and the Pursuit of Perfect"

Merritt is especially known for "The Voter Project" and "The People Project," both demonstrations of ways that public journalism could affect journalistic practice.

In 2017, W. Davis Merritt was inducted into the Kansas Newspaper Hall of Fame.
