= Samuel Merritt (disambiguation) =

Samuel Merritt (1822–1890) was the mayor of Oakland, California.

Samuel Merritt may also refer to:

- Samuel Augustus Merritt (1827–1910), American politician and judge in California, Idaho Territory, and Utah Territory
- Samuel A. Merritt (Maryland politician) (died 1904), American politician from Maryland
- Samuel Merritt University, formerly Samuel Merritt College
- Gen. Samuel Merritt, the antagonist of the 1955 film Conquest of Space
