= Emma Frances Grayson Merritt =

American educator (1860–1933)

- Born: January 11, 1860; Dumfries, Virginia
- Died: June 8, 1933 (aged 73)
- Occupation: Educator
- Known for: Established first kindergarten for black children in the United States

Emma Frances Grayson Merritt (January 11, 1860 – June 8, 1933) was an American educator. In 1897, she established the first kindergarten for black children in the United States.

== Life and career ==
Merritt was born to John and Sophia (née Cook) Merritt in Dumfries, Virginia. Her parents moved the family to Washington, D.C. in 1863, and Merritt was educated in the public school system.

She began teaching first grade in 1875 in the Washington, D.C. public school system when she was 15 years old, prior to receiving formal training. She continued to teach while attending Howard University's normal school program from 1883–1887. She also studied at George Washington University from 1887–1890, and received specialized training in mathematics at Howard University from 1889 to 1892. In 1887, she received the position of elementary school principal at the Banneker School.

She founded the first kindergarten for African American children in 1897. Merritt then became director of primary instruction in the District of Columbia in 1898.

Merritt is known for making several contributions to the District of Columbia school system: she raised kindergarten teachers' salaries; she started the first summer school at Stevens School; she organized democratization and observational programs to improve teaching; she introduced silent reading; and she innovated field trips around the city.

She was a member of the Executive Committee of the District of Columbia branch of the NAACP, a member of the executive board of the Southwest Settlement Society, and financial chairman at the Phyllis Wheatley YWCA.

== Works ==
- "American Prejudice: Its Causes, Effect, and Possibilities." Voice of the Negro, July 1905.
- "Douglas Day." Voice of the Negro, April 1906.
