= William Merritt =

William Merritt may refer to:

- William Merritt Chase (1849–1916), American painter
- Guy William "Tripp" Merritt III (1968–2020), American football coach
- William "Schute" Merritt (1910 or 1911–1988), American baseball player
- William Merritt (mayor) (died 1708), Dutch politician
- William H. Merritt (1821–1890), American politician and journalist
- William Hamilton Merritt (1793–1862), Canadian politician
- William Hamilton Merritt III (1855–1918), Canadian soldier
- William "Willie" Merritt (1872–1961), American football player and attorney
- William Merritt Steger (1920–2006), American judge

== See also ==
- Bill Merritt (disambiguation)
