= Howard Sutermeister Merritt =

American art historian and collector (1915–2007)

- Born: June 12, 1915
- Died: June 25, 2007 (aged 92)
- Education: BA Oberlin College, MA and PhD Princeton University
- Occupation(s): Art historian and professor
- Known for: Research studies on the Hudson River School

Howard Sutermeister Merritt (June 12, 1915 - 25 June 2007) was an American art historian and collector.

== Life ==
Sutermeister Merritt received a bachelor's degree from Oberlin College in 1942 and a Master of Fine Arts degree from Princeton University. From 1942 to 1945 he served in the United States Army. He then returned to Princeton, where he worked on his Ph.D. from 1945 to 1946. But in 1946, before the completion of his dissertation, he accepted an assistant position at the University of Rochester.

Prior to his time at University of Rochester, he specialized in the history of Italian painting of the early 16th century and wrote his Princeton dissertation on the Florentine artist Bachiacca (also spelled Bacchiacca). His interest expanded to include American landscape painting of the 19th century, specifically to the art of the Hudson River School and its founder, Thomas Cole. In 1958 he concluded his Ph.D. at Princeton University and became assistant professor. In 1963 he was appointed a full professor at the same university; he retired in 1976.

Merritt's interest in rare books and prints led him, along with his wife, to become a well-known collector and dealer of antiques.
