= Bill Merritt =

Bill Merritt may refer to:

- Jacory "Bill" Croskey-Merritt (born 2001), American football player
- Bill Merritt (cricketer) (1908–1977), New Zealand cricketer
- Bill Merritt (catcher) (1870–1937), American baseball player
- Bill Merritt (pitcher) (1886–?), American baseball player

== See also ==
- William Merritt (disambiguation)
