= Journal of Electronic Imaging =

- Discipline: Digital imaging
- Language: English
- Edited by: Zeev Zalevsky

Publication details
- History: 1992–present
- Publisher: SPIE and IS&T
- Frequency: Bimonthly
- Impact factor: 1 (2025)

Standard abbreviations
- ISO 4: J. Electron. Imaging

Indexing
- CODEN: JEIME5
- ISSN: 1017-9909 (print); 1560-229X (web)
- LCCN: 92640158
- OCLC no.: 23553442

Links
- Journal homepage; Online access; Journal archive

The Journal of Electronic Imaging is a peer-reviewed scientific journal published bimonthly by SPIE and the Society for Imaging Science and Technology. It covers all technology topics pertaining to the field of electronic imaging. The editor-in-chief is Zeev Zalevsky.

== Abstracting and indexing ==
The journal is abstracted and indexed in:

- Current Contents/Electronics & Telecommunications
- Current Contents/Engineering, Computing & Technology
- EBSCO databases
- Ei Compendex
- Inspec
- Science Citation Index Expanded
- Scopus

According to the Journal Citation Reports, the journal has a 2025 impact factor of 1.
