= Civic journalism =

Journalism done in the public interest

Civic journalism, also known as public journalism, is an approach to journalism that places an emphasis on citizen engagement and public deliberation in addition to informing the public. It developed as a critique of the idea that journalists and audiences are merely spectators in political and social life, instead treating community members as participants in public discussion.

== History ==
In the 1920s, before the concept of public journalism emerged, Walter Lippmann and John Dewey debated the role of journalism in a democracy. Lippmann argued that journalists should report policymakers' statements, while Dewey emphasized a more engaged role, with journalists critically examining information and considering the consequences of policies. Dewey saw journalism as integral to democratic dialogue.

Decades later, Jay Rosen and Davis Merritt expanded on Dewey's ideas, developing the concept of public journalism in 1993. Their 1994 manifesto described public journalism as placing journalists within the political community as responsible participants, while maintaining distinctions between journalists, political leaders, and citizens. Rosen explained that public journalists aim to make public life work and are willing to end their neutrality on certain questions, such as whether communities address their problems or whether politics merits public attention.

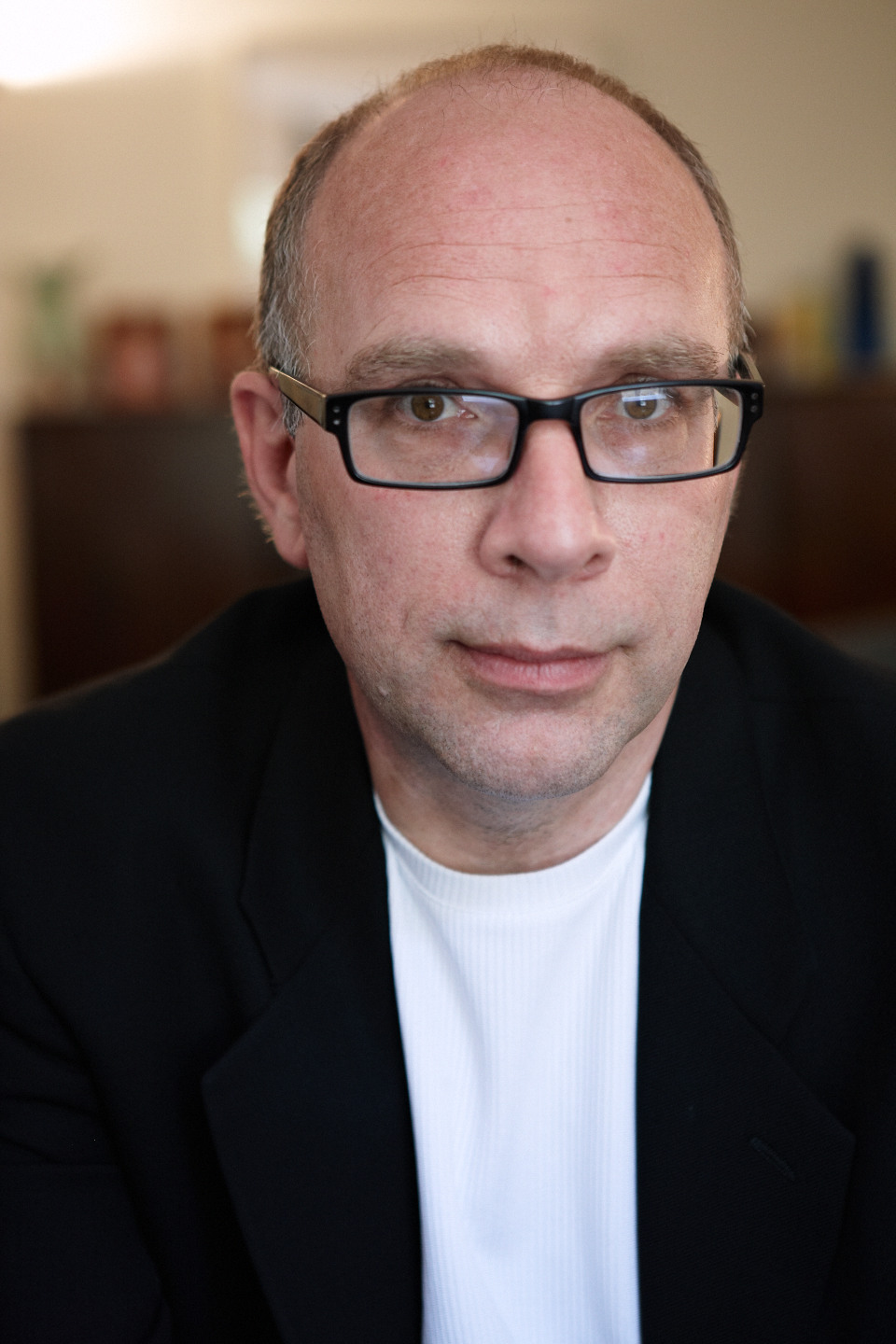
Picture of Jay Rosen, a professor of journalism at New York University.

According to communication scholar Seong Jae Min, civic journalism gained traction in academic and professional journalism circles in the 1990s. He reports that the rise of this idea combined with ongoing dissent over traditional journalistic practice led to the movement of public journalism. "This new journalistic movement was born to defeat the plagues of modern democracy in which citizens are alienated from civic life and reduced to passive voters". He later admits that this movement was superficially prescriptive, and that due to several reasons it was eclipsed by the movement for citizen journalism.

== Definition ==
According to the now dormant Pew Center for Civic Journalism, the practice "is both a philosophy and a set of values supported by some evolving techniques to reflect both of those in journalism. At its heart is a belief that journalism has an obligation to public life – an obligation that goes beyond just telling the news or unloading lots of facts. The way we do our journalism affects the way public life goes." Leading organizations in the field include the now dormant Pew Center, the Kettering Foundation, the Participatory Journalism Interest Group (formerly named the Civic and Citizen Journalism Interest Group) in the Association for Education in Journalism and Mass Communication (AEJMC) and the Public Journalism Network.

Although they developed the concept of public journalism together, both Rosen and Merritt have differing viewpoints on what exactly public journalism is.

Rosen defines public journalism as a way of thinking about the business of the craft that calls on journalists to (1) address people as citizens, potential participants in public affairs, rather than victims or spectators; (2) help the political community act upon, rather than just learn about, its problems; (3) improve the climate of public discussion, rather than simply watch it deteriorate; and (4) help make public life go well, so that it earns its claim on our attention and (5) speak honestly about its civic values, its preferred view of politics, its role as a public actor.

Rosen explains five ways to understand public journalism:

- As an argument, a way of thinking about what journalist should be doing, given their own predicament and the general state of public life.
- As an experiment, a way of breaking out of established routines and making a different kind of contribution to public life.
- As a movement involving practicing journalists, former journalists who want to improve their craft, academics and researchers with ideas to lend and studies that might help, foundations and think tanks that gave financial assistance and sanctuary to the movement, and other like-minded folk who wanted to contribute to the rising spirit of reform.
- As a debate with often heated conversation within the press and with others outside it about the proper role of the press.
- As an adventure, an open-ended and experimental quest for another kind of press.

Merritt, on the other hand, explains that it is the responsibility of the journalist to act as a fair-minded participant in the public arena. His famous analogy of the journalist having the same role as a sports referee best depicts this idea:

The function of a third party – a referee or umpire or judge – in sports competition is to facilitate the deciding of the outcome. Ideally, the official impinges on the game; if things go according to the rules, he or she is neither seen nor heard. Yet the presence of a fair-minded participant is necessary in order for an equitable decision to be reached. What he or she brings to the arena is knowledge of the agreed-upon rules, the willingness to contribute that knowledge, and authority – that is, the right to be attended to. The referee's role is to make sure that the process works as the contestants agreed it should. In order to maintain that authority, that right to be heard, the referee must exhibit no interest in the final score other than it is arrived at under the rules. But, both for referees and contestants, that is the ultimate interest. It is important to remember that the referee doesn't make the rules. Those are agreed on by the contestants – in this case, the democratic public. The referee, rather, is the fair-minded caretaker. What journalist should bring to the arena of public life is knowledge of the rules – how the public has decided a democracy should work and the ability and the willingness to provide relevant information and a lace for that information to be discussed and turned into democratic consent. Like the referee, to maintain our authority – the right to be heard – we must exhibit no partisan interest in the specific outcome other than it is arrived at under the democratic process.

Not only set of values but mainly set of civil rights for the citizens to decide directly in the making of the news and in the management of media as far they are part of public power, belonging to the people as the sovereign.

In a National Public Radio interview Merritt summed up civic journalism as "a set of values about the craft that recognizes and acts upon the interdependence between journalism and democracy. It values the concerns of citizens over the needs of the media and political actors, and conceives of citizens as stakeholders in the democratic process rather than as merely victims, spectators or inevitable adversaries. As inherent participants in the process, we should do our work in ways that aid in the resolution of public problems by fostering broad citizen engagement."

== Civic journalism in recent years ==
In recent history, civic journalism has played an important role in the development of society. This is evident in civic journalism's adoption of a more holistic approach towards recognizing the need for criminal justice reform, societal improvement, enhanced professional capacity, and strengthened institutions that support free speech and the development of technological infrastructure. Specifically, civic journalism has played a major role in the development of countries by helping spur democratic transitions, encouraging economic growth, conducting public health campaigns, and imposing accountability on politicians. For instance, in Guadalajara, Mexico, the local media played a major role in keeping the Mexican government accountable in their role behind an explosion in 1992 that killed over 200 people. Similarly, in 2012, many journalists worked to expose Apple's working conditions in Chinese factories. Many believe the role that civic journalists play in keeping politicians and corporations in check is one of their most important functions. Additionally, civic journalism can help form political agendas, and can have a policy agenda-setting effect.

== The evolution of civic journalism ==
Civic journalism continues to rapidly evolve over time. The future of civic journalism appears fluid. However, it is speculated to consist of privately owned, independent media. This is a far cry from the past, where the majority of news outlets were publicly owned. Many believe that the presence of many private media companies operating in a single country is one of the best ways to increase the effectiveness of democracy. As civic journalism evolves, its effect on society changes as well.

Civic journalism plays a major role in daily life. Many studies identify a positive relationship between engagement with civic journalism and increased civic participation in local communities. One of the first instances of civic journalism being widely used in politics was Barack Obama's presidential campaign in 2008. As the world becomes more interconnected through the internet, so does civic journalism. With access to the internet at an all-time high, people are more able to interact with civic journalism media outlets, giving them access to vast amounts of information. However, with information so widespread and available, ethical questions arise to challenge journalistic integrity.

Concerns about ethics in civic journalism are a contentious issue, as it can quickly polarize. These debates plague the civic journalism community and force it to evaluate its approach to journalism. In recent years, some have questioned the ethics of prominent media conglomerates, such as Facebook, and the role they play in civic journalism. Many have suggested possible solutions or guidelines to ethical journalism, such as frameworks for ethical lobbying; however, the law remains inconclusive.

With the internet having a greater influence on civic journalism, social media outlets are starting to play a bigger role in civic journalism as well. The future of civic journalism is moving digital as more and more media move away from a traditional medium. For instance, in the wake of the 2013 Boston Marathon bombings, traditional news channels relied heavily on videos, pictures, and comments from social media platforms for coverage of the event. Similarly, ethical concerns regarding civic journalism on social media arise as our laws are not always well-equipped to handle emerging issues regarding data privacy, censorship, and other contemporary subjects.

== Goals ==
The goal of civic journalism, or public journalism, is to allow the community to remain engaged with journalists and news outlets, restore democratic values, and rebuild the public's trust in journalists. The ubiquity of "fake news" and biased reporting in the modern media landscape has led to an overall decrease in the trust that people put in journalists and media sources. Proponents of civic journalism believe that this philosophy will allow individuals to have a greater say in decision-making and in the broader political sphere.

Given the rise in yellow journalism and search engine optimization algorithms that create an echo-chamber among mass media, civic journalism is entering a niche role where it can shift the position of news within public reception. Recently, news publishers have undergone more and more scrutiny as their ethics and content come under extensive scrutiny for political biases. Civic journalism pivots the role of publishers from distributing information to curating information. Given one of civic journalism's central tenets - making the press a forum for discussion of community issues - a publisher is able to seek out a niche in bolstering local engagement over spreading knowledge of international issues readily available on the internet.

== Related concepts ==
Citizen journalism is a variety of journalism that is conducted by people who are not simply professional journalists, but who convey information by using social media and various blog posts. Recently, citizen journalism has expanded its worldwide influence despite continuing concerns over whether citizen journalists are as reliable as true, well-practiced journalists. The goal of citizen journalists is to increase civic engagement, similar to how the goal of civic journalism is to increase civic engagement. Citizen journalists may be influencers as opposed to accredited journalists, but still have a substantial means of conveying their message to the general public.

== Political journalism ==
Political journalism is a similar concept, with four key pillars: the framing of politics as a strategic game, conflict framing and media negativity, interpretive versus straight news, and political or partisan bias. These four pillars are integral to the ideology as a whole. Political journalism relates to civic journalism in that it is a movement towards democratizing the media to partake in the voting process.

Political journalism's first pillar, the framing of politics as a strategic game, is meant to signify how politics should not simply be seen as a simple election process for democracies. In order to win, one must play the game well. Civic journalism and political journalism are meant to be tools for successful democratic elections in viewing politics as a strategic game. This is mainly because they both encourage constituents to voice their opinions so that politicians are more representative of the true whole. The second pillar is conflict framing and media negativity, because information portrayed in the media can often be skewed or false. Political journalism offers an avenue to resolve this issue and eliminates potential conflicts of interest. The third pillar is interpretative versus straight news. Often, the way that information is portrayed is not entirely neutral, and has some bias. Media sources may leave the implications or ramifications of a certain news event up to interpretation by the viewer. An idea that relates to this is interpretive journalism, or interpretive reporting, which requires a journalist to go beyond the basic facts related to a news event and provide a deeper analysis or coverage of an event. Finally, the last pillar is political or partisan bias, which in a sense relates to the rest of these pillars as well. Political or partisan bias refers to the non-neutrality of news coverage or general political occurrences. Often, when politicians speak they are heavily biased, and it is up to the individual to determine whether to believe what they are hearing. Political and civic journalism provide an avenue for the media and the general public to integrate into the democratic process to promote transparency.

== Main tenets ==
According to The Roots of Civic Journalism by David K. Perry, the practitioners of civic journalism – who saw the movement's most drastic growth in the early 1990s – have always adhered to the basic tenets of public journalism:

- "Attempting to situate newspapers and journalists as active participants in community life, rather than as detached spectators."
- "Making a newspaper a forum for discussion of community issues."
- "Favoring the issues, events and problems important to ordinary people."
- "Considering public opinion through the process of discussion and debate among members of a community."
- "Attempting to use journalism to enhance social capital."

== Structure ==
Usually formulated by a few devoted members in a newsroom, civic journalism projects are typically associated with the opinion section of papers. These projects are usually found in the form of organized town meetings and adult education programs. The Public Journalism Network explains that "journalism and democracy work best when news, information and ideas flow freely; when news portrays the full range and variety of life and culture of all communities; when public deliberation is encouraged and amplified; and when news helps people function as political actors and not just as political consumers."

== Key proponents and opponents ==
Civic journalism is a polarizing philosophy, according to the University of Nebraska-Lincoln College of Journalism and Mass Communications.

Proponents believe integrating journalism into the democratic process helps inform voters and makes them more aware of what is occurring in the political sphere. It may make a difference in the democratic process if all voters are well-informed. Civic journalism itself is the process of integrating journalism into the democratic process and allowing voters and the media to play a more active role rather than being witnesses and bystanders of political events.

Opponents find civic journalism to be risky and ineffective and believe it brings about conflicts of interest and necessitates involvement in unethical public affairs.

Notable proponents of civic journalism include:

- John Bender, assistant professor of new editorial at the University of Nebraska-Lincoln, claims that journalists who are the most esteemed and highly regarded play active roles in helping their community thrive.
- David Mathews, president of the Kettering Foundation and a supporter of civic journalism states that, "when people are in the business of making choices, are going to look for information to inform their choices." Mathews affirms that civic journalism is aimed at aligning journalistic practices with the ways that citizens form publics, in turn creating a more efficient and reciprocal way of communicating with readers.
- Jay Rosen, a journalism professor at New York University, is one of the earliest proponents of civic journalism. From 1998 to 1999, Rosen wrote and spoke frequently about civic journalism. He published his book, What Are Journalists For? in 1999 about the early rise of the civic journalism movement. Rosen writes a popular blog called PressThink.
- W. Davis "Buzz" Merritt Jr., a former editor of The Wichita Eagle, is another pioneer of civic journalism. Merritt is a key advocate for news media reforms, and published his book Public Journalism and Public Life in 1995. Merritt began exploring civic journalism after acknowledging loss of public trust in traditional journalistic values. Merritt feels that journalists need a clear understanding and appreciation for the interdependence of journalism and democracy.
- James W. Carey, a media critic and a journalism instructor at Columbia University, was an advocate for the public journalism movement. He saw it as a "reawakening of an antecedent tradition of journalism and politics, one that emphasizes local democracy, the community of locale, and citizenship as against the distant forces that would overwhelm it...public journalism performs a great service in reminding us what is work protecting."
- Seong Jae Min states that the idea of public or civic journalism is a notion that the press not only informs the public, but also works toward engaging citizens and creating public debate. It was "about problem solving for the public rather than truth seeking." But it eventually faltered for several reasons: public journalism lacked clear conceptual definitions, ignored news businesses' commercial interests, and its effort was artificial, surrounded by many textbook, normative parameters of deliberative democracy: public journalists imposed shared values and goals on citizens to force problem solving and public judgment.

== Case studies ==
- The Citizen Voices Project was one newspaper's attempt to facilitate civic conversation within the diverse city of Philadelphia. Citizen Voices came into effect in 1999, during a very close mayoral election between a black democrat and a white republican. Citizen Voices was modeled on the National Issues Forum and was intended to amplify minority voices not frequently acknowledged in the political realm. Forums were held throughout the city, facilitating deliberation of the most important issues facing citizens: jobs, neighborhoods, public safety, and reforming city hall. Essays written by Citizen Voices participants were published in the commentary pages of The Philadelphia Inquirer, while the editorial board framed its coverage of the campaign around the five designated issues. While the Citizen Voices Project did not increase voter turnout, it has given journalists a new perspective on how to cover urban political issues.
- The Front Porch Forum was introduced in Seattle in 1994 through a partnership between the Seattle Times newspaper, KUOW-FM radio station and the Pew Center for Civic Journalism. The mission of the Front Porch Forum was to strengthen communities through news coverage that focuses on citizens' concerns, encourages civic participation, improves public deliberation and reconnects citizens, candidates and reporters to community life. Over the course of 5 ½ years, the Seattle Times and KUOW-FM featured a series of stories highlighting issues that affect Seattle residents, and encouraged readers' participation.
- Critical thinking in Public Journalism: "Public conversation imagined in public journalism was rigid and artificial. Public journalism placed a high premium on consensus and civility, it has made no space for social movements and settled for a demure, middle-class conception of public life."
