= Matthew Merritt =

Matthew Merritt may refer to:

- Matthew J. Merritt (1895–1946), American politician from New York
- Matthew F. Merritt (1815–1896), American politician from Connecticut
