= Tom Merritt (politician) =

American businessman and politician

Tom Merritt (October 20, 1911 – December 21, 1991) was an American businessman and politician.

Merritt was born in Rossville, Illinois. He graduated from Onarga Military School. Merritt also went to DePauw University and Purdue University. Merriitt lived in Hoopeston, Illinois with his wife and family. He was involved with the insurance, real estate, and farm loan business. He served as the Hoopeston City Treasurer from 1937 to 1941 and on the Vermillion County, Illinois Board of Supervisors from 1947 to 1964. Merritt was a Republican. Merritt served in the Illinois Senate from 1965 to 1976. Merritt was a member of the Illinois Bicentennial Commission. He opted not to run for reelection in the 1976 general election. That year, Republican State Representative Max Coffey defeated Democratic candidate and Vermilion County State's Attorney Richard J. Doyle of Hoopeston to succeed Merritt. He also served as chairman of the Port of Chicago Commission and as chairman of the Illinois Economic Development Commission. Merritt died at the Hoopeston Community Hospital in Hoopeston, Illinois.
