= Snow anchor =

Equipment for creating anchors in climbing

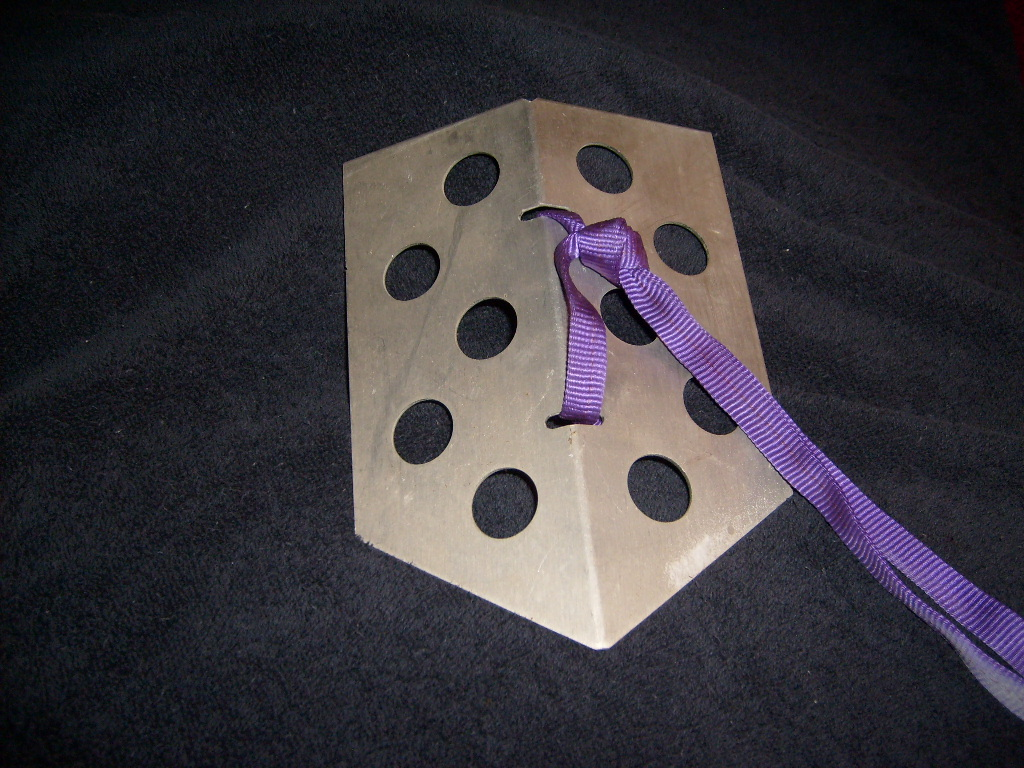
A snow fluke

A snow picket

A snow anchor (also called a snow pro) is a type of natural or artificial protection used in mountaineering, alpine climbing and ice climbing as an anchor. Two common artificial devices are the snow fluke and snow picket. A snow anchor is used both for climbing and for securing tents and other camping gear, that is designed for use in sand and snow.

A snow fluke is a bent square or rectangle, approximately 8 by 10 inches (20 by 25 cm), and is made of aluminum or other metal, with a cable attached at two points on the upper surface. A fluke correctly used is buried in the snow, tip pointed down, approximately 40° from the angle of the mountain slope. Flukes can deflect or dislodge in harder-packed or dry snow, and are therefore more reliably used in heavy, moist snow.

A snow picket is usually made of lightweight aluminum in 18–36-inch-long (46–91 cm) long T-shaped design.

== See also ==
- Glossary of climbing terms
- Rock-climbing equipment
