= Clifton R. Merritt =

American wilderness protection and conservation activist

- Born: November 29, 1919; Helena, Montana
- Died: August 12, 2008 (aged 88); Bozeman, Montana

Clifton R. Merritt was born November 29, 1919, in the Prickly Pear Valley (now known as the Helena Valley) of Montana. Merritt was director of field services for the Wilderness Society for 15 years, after which time he continued to advocate for wilderness protection and conservation until his death in 2008.

== Early life and education ==
Clifton Merritt was born November 29, 1919, in the Prickly Pear Valley (now known as the Helena Valley) of Montana. He grew up on the cattle ranch his grandfather settled in the 1890s near the Gates of the Wilderness Mountains along the upper Missouri River. In his youth he was plagued by illness including polio and a triple heart valve leakage at age 15. Despite these physical ailments, Merritt was an avid hunter, fisherman, and hiker, often enjoying these activities with his twin brother, Don.

Clif attended college at Carroll College in Helena, Montana taking courses in liberal arts and sociology. After leaving Carroll, Merritt moved to Kalispell, Montana, and worked for the Bureau of Employment Security and Montana State Employment Service. He rose to Field Supervisor for the Bureau of Employment Security which involved hiring, training, and supervising of over 150 employees in nine (or more) field offices. Merritt held this position from 1953 to 1964.

== Career ==
During his time in Kalispell, Merritt helped found the Montana Wilderness Association in 1957. He also served in various positions for the Montana Wildlife Federation from 1950 to 1964. With these organizations, Merritt was a leader in getting the Montana Stream Protection Act adopted and halting the establishment of the Spruce Park and Glacier View dams on the Flathead River, as well as spearheading the movement to get the 15,000 acre Jewel Basin Hiking Area established.

In 1964, Clifton Merritt became director of field services for The Wilderness Society. He began his work in Washington, DC, lobbying for the establishment of the Wilderness Act of 1964. Believing that the wilderness movement needed to garner the support of local citizens in order to add areas to the National Wilderness Preservation System, Merritt established The Wilderness Society's Western Regional Office in Denver, Colorado, in 1966. In the Regional Office, Merritt trained and supervised a 15-person professional staff of natural resource specialists and field representatives stationed throughout the West. Through the efforts of Merritt and his staff, working closely with local groups, millions of acres were added to the National Wilderness Preservation System. Among those added were the Scapegoat, Absaroka-Beartooth, and River of No Return wildernesses in Montana and the Weminuche, Flat Tops, and Eagles Nest wildernesses in Colorado. After an organizational shakeup and upon hearing of the planned closing of the Regional Office, Merritt resigned from the Wilderness Society in 1978.

In 1979, Merritt, Sally Ranney, and Jerry Mallet, seeing a need left by the closing of The Wilderness Society's Regional Office, formed The American Wilderness Alliance (known after 1983 as American Wildlands) based in Denver, Colorado. The organization worked with conservation groups throughout the Rocky Mountain West to preserve public lands for wildlife habitat and recreation. The American Wilderness Alliance was instrumental in getting the 161,000 acre Elkhorn National Wildlife Management Area established in Montana as well as ensuring the passage of the Colorado Wilderness Bill which gave wilderness designation to 1.4 million acres of public lands. In addition to serving as executive director, Merritt also edited the organization's Wild America magazine and wrote and edited its On the Wild Side newsletter.

== Later years ==
In 1984, Clifton Merritt returned to Montana and settled in the Bitterroot Valley. He still maintained the executive directorship of American Wildlands and the organization relocated to Bozeman, Montana, later that year. In 1990, Merritt stepped back from the executive directorship and became associate executive director. It was in 1990 that Merritt began the Corridors of Life Program. The Program used Geographic Information Systems to map wildlife migration corridors between roadless areas and established wilderness areas. As of 2009, American Wildlands’ Corridors of Life Program continues to work to restore and maintain wildlife corridors.

In 1998, at age 79, Clifton Merritt stepped down as associate executive director of American Wildlands. Though no longer in a leadership role at the organization, Merritt continued to support wilderness and environmental initiatives as a member of the organization he had helped found. He also continued to support local wilderness issues through membership with the organization Friends of the Bitterroot and continued membership with the Montana Wilderness Association and Montana Wildlife Federation.

Clifton Merritt had been a prolific writer all his life and his retirement afforded him more time for this interest. He began to pen his memoirs of the wilderness movement, which he titled Beyond the Roads. He also began work on a history of his grandfather's settlement in the Prickly Pear Valley, which he called I Remember my Grandfather. Merritt was awarded an honorary doctorate by the University of Montana in 2007 for his career contributions of environmental preservation. In 2008, the Wilderness Society honored Merritt's career of environmental service by awarding him The Robert Marshall Award, which is the highest honor for a private citizen who has made exemplary contributions to conservation and upholding a high standard of land ethic. Merritt died in Bozeman, Montana on August 12, 2008, at the age of 89.
