= Mark Daniel Merritt =

- Born: 1961 (age 63–64); New London, Connecticut, U.S.
- Occupations: Composer; arranger

Mark Daniel Merritt (born 1961 in New London, CT) (ASCAP) is an American composer and arranger with published choral works mostly for church choirs.

Merritt's commissions, include a commission in 2007 partially funded by the Kentucky Arts Council, to compose the score to the musical River Dreams, which had its world premiere in July of that year. River Dreams is an adaptation of the book, A Long Row to Hoe, the autobiography of Kentucky author Billy C. Clark. The play was written by Betty Peterson. In an interview with the Daily Independent newspaper in Ashland, Kentucky, the director of the play Edward Figgins states, "Music by composer Mark Daniel Merritt captures the mood of Peterson's lyrics."

The American Organist gave the following review of Merritt's published Christmas piece, "Deo Gratias:"

This setting of "Adam lay ybounden" will give Boris Ord's a run for its money. Well crafted and singable, this is sung with "traditional" harmonic language. An accompaniment for rehearsal is provided.

Originally from Noank, CT, Merritt now resides in the Columbia, South Carolina area. Merritt earned his Doctor of Musical Arts from the University of South Carolina.
