= Jeff Merritt =

Urban development and technology executive

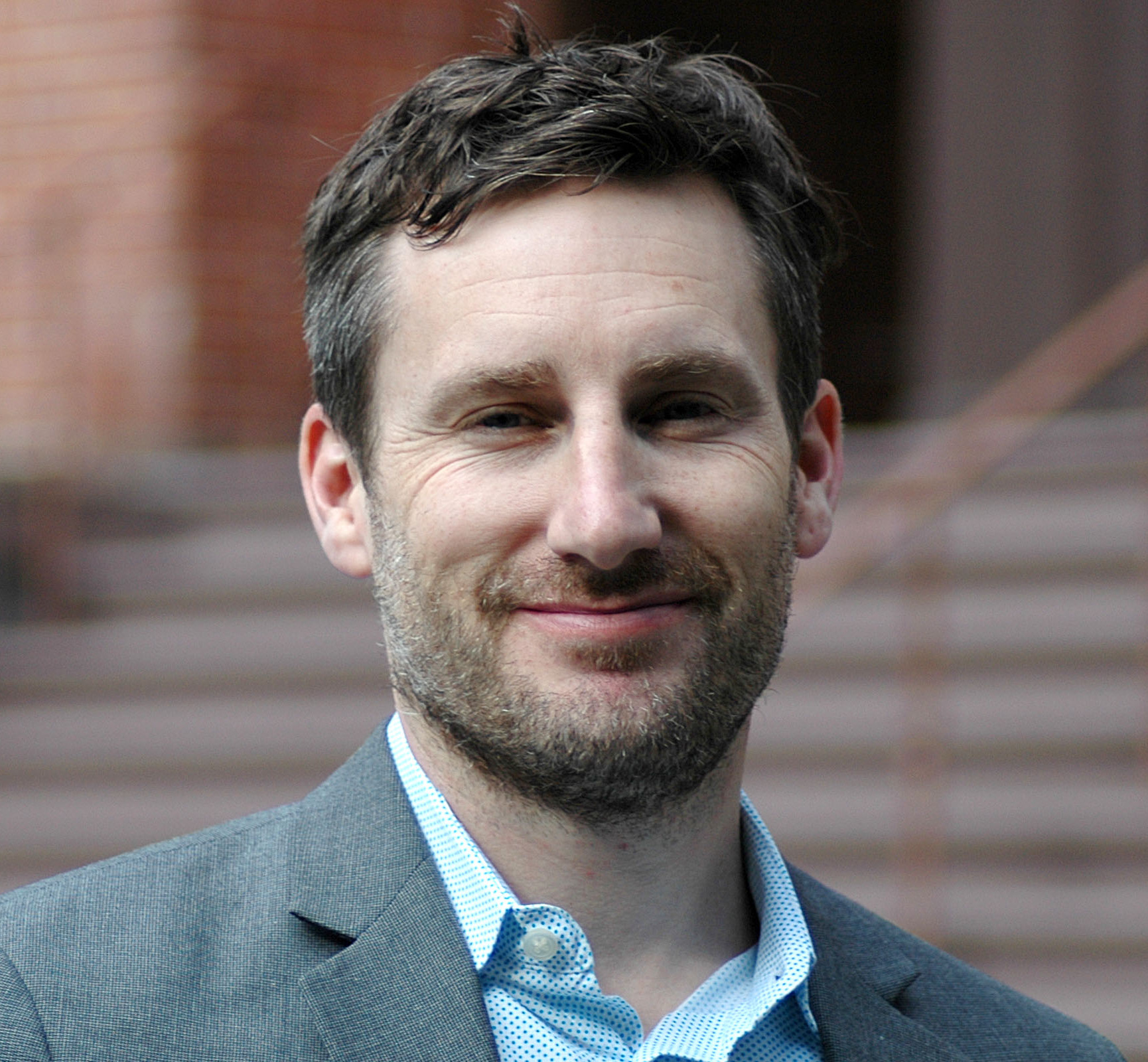
- Jeff S. Merritt, 2017
- Born: Jeff Scott Merritt; 1978 (age 47–48)
- Education: University of Michigan; Columbia University
- Occupations: Nonprofit executive, government official
- Employer: World Economic Forum
- Title: Head, Centre for Urban Transformation, World Economic Forum
- Spouse: Kristyn Pomranz (m. 2017)

Jeff Merritt (born 1978) is an American executive whose work has focused on urban development, public-private collaboration, economic resilience, smart cities and emerging technologies. He joined the World Economic Forum in 2017 where he headed the Centre for Urban Transformation and was a member of the organisation's executive committee He was previously Director of Innovation for the City of New York under Mayor Bill de Blasio, and before entering city government founded Grassroots Initiative, a New York nonprofit that assisted first-time and minority candidates for local office.

== Early life ==
Merritt graduated from the University of Michigan and received a master's degree in international and public affairs from Columbia University.

== Career ==
=== Early Career ===
Merritt worked in Michigan state government in the 1990s before seeking work overseas. He went on to work with U.S. State Department-sponsored democracy programmes in Eastern Europe, including in Croatia and Albania.

From 2003 to 2005 Merritt was executive director of the Center for Civic Responsibility, a nonprofit based in Metuchen, New Jersey that worked to promote government reform and civic engagement. He contributed a chapter on funders' priorities and the local realities of transition programming to Transacting Transition: The Micropolitics of Democracy Assistance in the Former Yugoslavia, published by Kumarian Press in 2006.

=== Grassroots Initiative ===
In 2005 Merritt founded Grassroots Initiative, a New York nonprofit that billed itself as the first not-for-profit political consulting firm and sought to give underrepresented groups and political outsiders easier access to the electoral process. As its president he advised first-time candidates on ballot access, strategy and voter outreach.

Under Merritt the organisation worked with five Sikh candidates who won seats on the Queens County Democratic Committee in the September 2006 primary, which The New York Times reported as the first time Sikhs had been elected to public office anywhere in the city.

Merritt directed the organisation's work under a 2009 contract with the New York City Department of Education engaged Grassroots Initiative to recruit candidates and encourage parents to take part in elections for the city's community and citywide education councils, which election officials billed as the first exclusively online public election in the United States.

=== Office of the Public Advocate ===
Merritt served as a senior adviser to Bill de Blasio at the Office of the New York City Public Advocate, where he led the office's open government and technology initiatives. These included an online watchlist of landlords with the worst housing code violation records, later linked from apartment listings on Craigslist, and an investigation into city agencies' compliance with New York State's Freedom of Information Law.

He also headed the Coalition for Accountability in Political Spending, an affiliated nonprofit founded by de Blasio in 2010 as a bipartisan group of elected officials pressing for greater transparency in corporate political spending.

=== Mayor's Office of Technology and Innovation ===
After de Blasio was elected Mayor of New York City, Merritt joined the mayor's office as a senior adviser and helped establish the Mayor's Office of Technology and Innovation in 2014. He was subsequently appointed the city's Director of Innovation, holding the post until 2017, and was credited with leading much of the city's work on emerging technologies and data-driven practice.

In 2014 Merritt led Tech for Universal Pre-K, which brought Google and other technology firms together with city agencies to plan enrolment for the mayor's universal pre-kindergarten programme; about 53,000 children were enrolled. He headed the rollout of the .nyc top-level domain, a project begun under the Bloomberg administration. A related site, neighborhoods.nyc, launched in 2015 to collate municipal data for more than 400 neighbourhoods.

Merritt argued for replacing prescriptive procurement with open-ended "calls for innovation" that asked firms to propose solutions rather than answer detailed specifications. The city used that method for its payphone replacement scheme, which became LinkNYC, announced in November 2014 and funded by advertising at no cost to taxpayers. In 2015 the city engaged the procurement platform Citymart to run five such challenges, and Merritt also worked on a broadband programme providing wireless corridors in underserved areas and free internet access for residents of public housing.

Under Merritt the office published guidelines on the deployment of internet of things technologies, which were subsequently followed by other American cities. He was also involved in establishing the city's Neighborhood Innovation Labs, which sought to involve residents in identifying local problems that technology might address.

In November 2016 New York was named Best Smart City at the Smart City Expo World Congress in Barcelona for the office's Building a Smart + Equitable City initiative. Merritt said that internet of things devices used effectively could produce cost savings and strengthen public health and safety, but that municipal leaders also needed to mitigate the risks such technologies posed to privacy and security.

=== World Economic Forum ===
In November 2017 Merritt left City Hall to join the World Economic Forum in San Francisco, leading its work on the internet of things within the Centre for the Fourth Industrial Revolution.

In 2019 the Forum became secretariat of the G20 Global Smart Cities Alliance, a grouping of city networks and technology governance organisations launched under Japan's presidency of the G20 to set shared norms for smart city technologies. Merritt, then the Forum's head of internet of things, robotics and smart cities, described the launch as a first step towards wider adoption of good practice and greater public confidence in how data is gathered in public places. When the alliance published a policy roadmap in 2020 covering privacy, cybersecurity, broadband access and open data, which 36 cities agreed to pilot, he said most cities lacked the capacity to work through the complexity of such deployments, leaving officials either stalled or taking a gamble.

Merritt was among the authors of Governing Smart Cities, a 2021 Forum report with Deloitte surveying officials in 36 cities, which found that fewer than a quarter carried out privacy impact assessments. He also led the Forum's Global IoT Council, which in December 2020 published a study of governance problems in connected technologies alongside an agreement among seven countries to help innovators navigate regulation across their markets.

In August 2021 the Forum announced a Global Centre for Urban Transformation headquartered in Detroit with Merritt leading the initiative. The Centre was established to increase public-private collaboration and advance more inclusive and sustainable models for urban development.

During Merritt's leadership, the Centre's work included sustainable urban development, local economic resilience and the built environment. In 2023 Switzerland launched the Davos Baukultur Alliance in partnership with the World Economic Forum, bringing together public, private and civil-society organizations around the development of high-quality, sustainable places. Merritt later represented the Alliance at the 2025 Venice Architecture Biennale.

The Forum launched Yes SF in 2023 with Deloitte, Salesforce and the San Francisco Chamber of Commerce, backing environmentally focused startups as part of an effort to revive the city's downtown, with Merritt as its public face for the Forum. Fourteen companies were selected in the first cohort and twelve in a second announced in 2025, by which time eleven of the first group had deployed products in the city. The model subsequently expanded as Yes/Cities, a place-based initiative designed to mobilize investment, strengthen local innovation ecosystems and create economic opportunity. Yes/Bengaluru launched in November 2025, followed by Yes/Boston in February 2026, with further expansion planned.

== Selected publications ==
- Merritt, Jeff S. (2006). "Quick Impact, Slow Recovery? Funders' Priorities and the Local Realities of Transition Programming". In Brown, Keith (ed.). Transacting Transition: The Micropolitics of Democracy Assistance in the Former Yugoslavia. Bloomfield, Connecticut: Kumarian Press. ISBN 978-1-56549-222-6. OCLC 65400474.
- Kontokosta, Constantine E.; Merritt, Jeff; Dolder, Sander (2018). "Solving City Challenges through Neighborhood Innovation Labs: Moving from Smart Cities to Informed Communities". In Corrêa d'Almeida, André (ed.). Smarter New York City: How City Agencies Innovate. New York: Columbia University Press. ISBN 978-0-231-18375-8.

== Personal life ==
In August 2017, Merritt married Kristyn Pomranz, a writer and editor, in Sheffield, Massachusetts.
