= Ukrainian Death Triangle =

Military situation in Ukraine at the end of WW1

The Ukrainian Death Triangle (Ukrainian: Трикутник смерті, romanized: Trykutnyk smerti) refers to a historical situation of Ukrainian national forces in 1919, when the Ukrainian People's Army, or UNA, found itself in the general area south of Kyiv surrounded by Bolshevik, White Guard, and Polish troops. In Ukraine, it is sometimes called the Quadrangle of Death (Ukrainian: Чотирикутник смерті, romanized: Chotyrykutnyk smerti) or Rectangle of Death (Ukrainian: Прямокутник смерті, romanized: Pryamokutnyk smerti), in connection with the also hostile Kingdom of Romania.

During the winter of 1919–1920, 25,000 Ukrainian soldiers died of typhus alone while hemmed in on three sides or, later, as prisoners of the Poles.

== Background ==
Denikin's offensive on Moscow during Summer 1919; joint Ukrainian forces marked green in left part of the map

The Ukrainian People's Republic proclaimed its independence from the Russian Republic in January 1918. However, the Soviet–Ukrainian War was ongoing at the time of the initial proclamation of independence. The army of the Ukrainian People's Republic (UPR) combined forces with the Ukrainian Galician Army, and they operated together starting in July 1919, under the command of Symon Petliura. During the summer and autumn of 1919, they operated successfully around Kyiv.

However, the two governments did not agree on several basic issues and acted inconsistently. Neither government commanded sufficient power to equip and maintain the combined army. And, internationally, the Triple Entente did not recognize any Ukrainian government, and did not provide aid to Ukraine during the conflict. Indeed, France provided aid to General Denikin's White army and the Polish army, both opponents of the Ukrainians.

== Environment ==
The time frame was October, the beginning of winter. Supplies of all kinds were low. Given the political and economic environment, resupply was scarce and inadequate.

== War between the Whites and Ukrainians ==
Territories controlled by Ukrainian forces (yellow) in Autumn 1919

In September 1919, General Anton Denikin, who was attacking the Bolsheviks without stopping the Advance on Moscow, started a war against the Ukrainian People's Army on the entire front. Denikin's forces invaded Kyiv and drove the Ukrainian army out of the capital. The Bolsheviks took advantage of this situation, and their 14th Army, sandwiched between Ukrainians and Denikin forces near Odesa, broke through Olhopil and Skvyra to Zhytomyr.

The situation at the end of 1919 significantly weakened the fighting capacity of the Ukrainian army. The cold winter was approaching, but there was a shortage of supplies for the army at the front, especially shoes and clothes. A witness to the event, N. Koval-Stepovy, recalled that, among the Cossacks, one could see many people with rag-wrapped legs or shoes with bare toes peeking out. Rifle and cannon ammunition were almost completely used up. There was an extreme shortage of medicine, and the fighting units of the army were engulfed in a terrible epidemic of typhus.

Surrounded on all sides, lacking a sufficient strategic base, weapons and ammunition, the Ukrainian army had to retreat before a large enemy - Moscow's White and Red armies. Poles threatened from the rear. In the winter of 1919–1920, 25,000 Ukrainian soldiers died of typhus.

== The Position of the International Community ==
The Chief Ataman was hoping for the help of the Triple Entente. The English journalist G. Arlsberg wrote that Petliura asked the International Red Cross "to save young Ukrainian people in the name of humanity." But the American Red Cross mission in Chernivtsi and Bucharest was in no hurry, saying that they must first save Denikin's followers. The situation was deteriorating, gradually becoming catastrophic.

The domestic political and economic situation of the Third Ukraine Directorate at the turn of 1919-1920 was also difficult. The struggle with three enemies, each of whom was stronger than the Ukrainian army, exhausted the physical and economic strength of the people. The directorate did not actually have a stable government and permanent territory, except for the Eastern part of Volhynia and Podillya. And this territory was often plundered by enemy armed forces, which pushed west or rolled back to the east, under pressure from the Ukrainian army, which destroyed cities and villages, declining industry and agriculture. The famine began in Ukraine.

== Armistice (ceasefire) of the UGA with Denikin ==
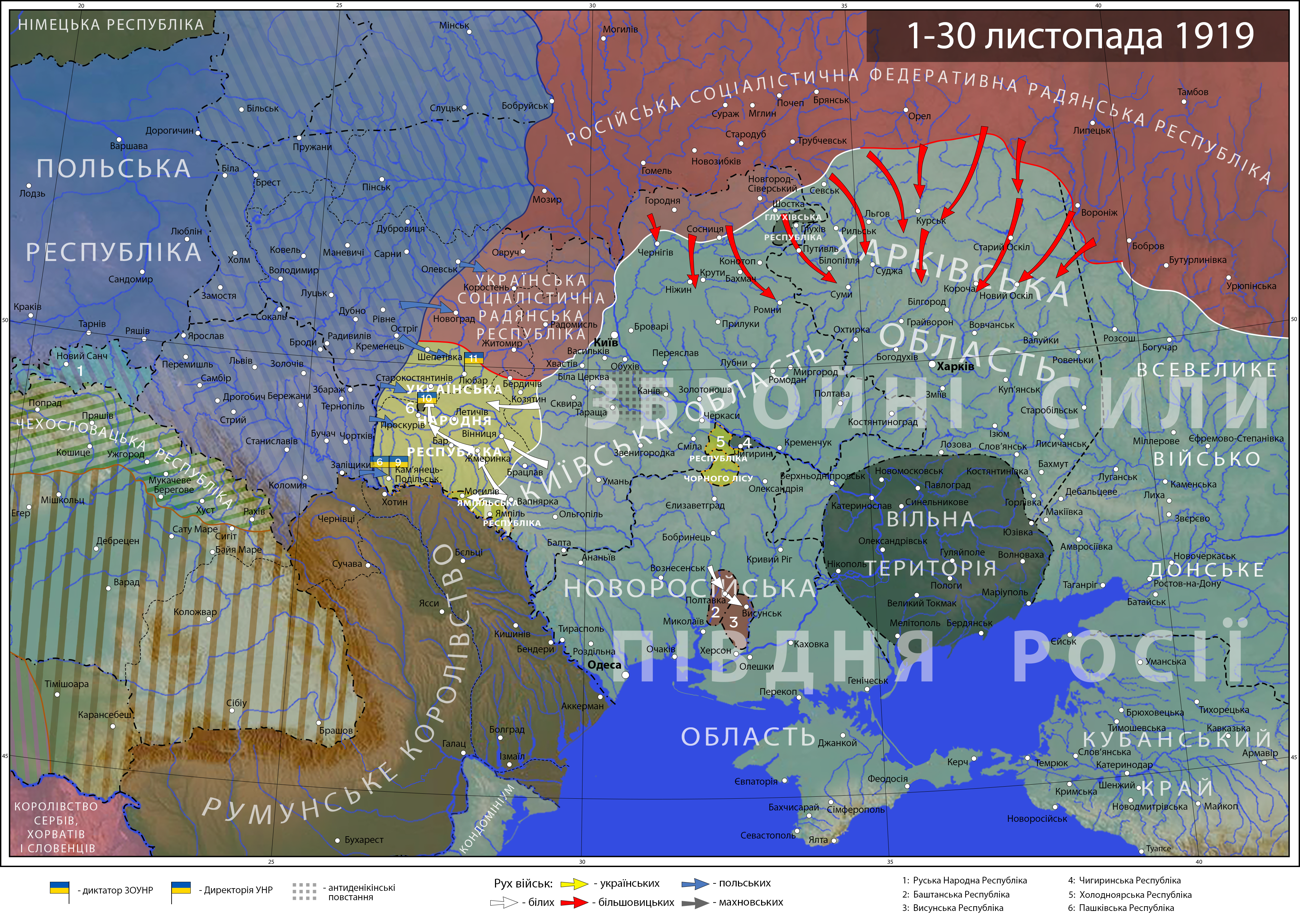
Offensive of White forces against the Ukrainian-held territory (green) in November 1919

As of November 1, 1919, the Volunteer Army occupied a front against the UPR army along the Kyiv-Kozyatyn-Starokostiantyniv line; The Red Army occupied the front line Kyiv-Berdychiv-Shepetivka against the army of the Ukrainian People's Republic.

At the beginning of November, due to the typhus epidemic, about 10,000 combat-ready riflemen remained in the ranks of the UGA. UGA Chief Physician Buryachynsky reported: "Our army no longer looks like an army, it's not a hospital anymore, but traveling corpses." At a military meeting of both headquarters (UGA and DA UPR) on November 4, 1919, in Zhmerynka, General Salsky said: "We are defeated by enemies, and the enemies are: typhus, famine, poor morale, without which no army can fight…"

At this time, the commander of the UGA, General Myron Tarnavsky, due to extremely difficult circumstances, in order to save his army, came to an agreement with Denikin. On November 6, his mission signed an agreement in Zyatkivtsi (Podillia) with General Denikin's Slashchov, according to which the Galician Army stopped fighting the Denikin Volunteer Army.

Units of the UPR Active Army that were left without UGA support had to retreat to Volhynia, closer to the Polish front.

== Internment ==
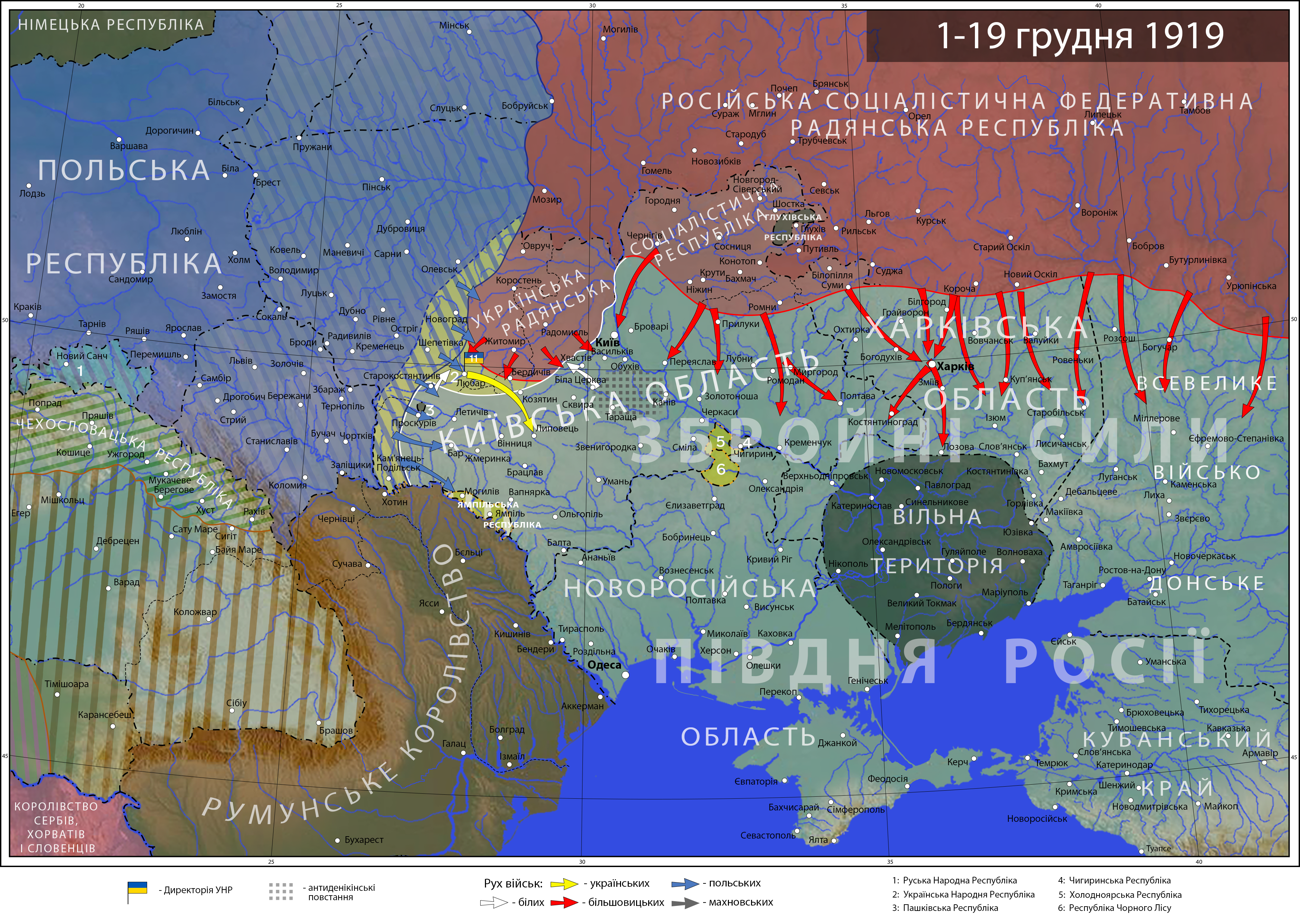
Ukrainian forces surrounded in the vicinity of Liubar (No.2 on the map) during the initial stages of First Winter Campaign

In the second half of November, the Dnieper army of the Ukrainian People's Republic withdrew to the Starokostiantyniv-Nova Chortoryia-Liubar area and found itself in a hopeless situation: the Bolshevik Red Army attacked it from the north, the Armed Forces of Southern Russia (Denikinites) from the south, and the Polish army from the west.

Under the blows of these forces, the Dnieper Army of the Ukrainian People's Republic became virtually incapable and disintegrated.

One part of it, led by Chief Otaman Petliura and the government of the Ukrainian People's Republic, decided, choosing a lesser evil, to go into captivity in Poland.

On November 26, 1919, a military meeting was held in Starokostiantyniv with the participation of Chief Otaman Petliura, members of the government, Otamans Yunakov, Tiutiunnyk, Volokh, the command of the Sich Riflemen, and others. Otaman Volokh accused the authorities and the Chief Otaman of defeats, saying that the only salvation was the recognition of Soviet power and the transition to the Ukrainian SSR to further fight the Denikinites and Poles for the independence and territorial integrity of Ukraine.

On December 2, in Nova Chortoria, at a meeting of Petliura with members of the government and representatives of the top command of the UPR army, it was decided to switch to a guerrilla form of struggle. At the same time, the Rifle Council decided to liquidate (disarm and self-dissolve) the Sich Rifle Corps; those wishing to continue the armed struggle moved to other units. On December 5, in Nova Chortoria, in his last order for the army, the Chief Otaman announced the appointment of Otaman Mykhailo Omelianovych-Pavlenko as commander of the Active Army, henceforth partisan.

Leaders of the UPR Directory (Makarenko, Shvets and others) emigrated abroad. On the night of December 5–6, Symon Petliura also left for Warsaw with his headquarters.

On December 6, 1919, a part of the army (up to 3,500 soldiers, the so-called Active Army) led by General Mykhailo Omelianovych-Pavlenko marched southeast, to the chagrin of the Denikinites, Galicians (who joined the Denikinites in November 1919) and the Bolsheviks. The First Winter Campaign of units of the former Army of the Ukrainian People's Republic began.

The Haidamak Brigade, led by Otaman Volokh, and other units that joined it, raised red flags, seized the state treasury from the Chief Otaman, and, breaking through the Denikin front and advancing with the fighting, in the Uman area, sided with the Red Army.

The disarmed Corps of Sich Riflemen, as well as some other Ukrainian units that remained in the area of Nova Chortoryia, were transported by Poles to Lutsk as internees (prisoners). Among them were the commanders of the Sich Rifle Corps, Colonels Yevhen Konovalets and Andriy Melnyk (Chief of Staff of the Corps).

In the Lutsk camp of interned (captured) Ukrainian soldiers, Yevhen Konovalets was appointed senior. Here, too, he had to make a lot of effort, energy and diplomatic skill to somehow alleviate the condition of the riflemen, among whom also spread a fierce plague of typhus. In the end, Konovalets managed to separate typhoid soldiers - the Polish authorities allocated the premises of the Lutsk prison near the castle for the hospital, where all the patients were relocated. But it didn't help much. Many officers and riflemen died of typhus in Lutsk. Andriy Melnyk also became seriously ill there. Similar or even worse circumstances developed in the Rivne camp, where a large number of officers and Cossacks of the Dnieper Army were also gathered. General Vasyl Tiutiunnyk (buried in the central cemetery of the city) died of typhus in Rivne.

Almost all members of the Riflemen's Council gathered in Lutsk. Yevhen Konovalets and his supporters still did not lose hope for the liberation of Ukraine, they considered the possibility of creating a new unit of the regular Ukrainian army. The former Chief Ataman Symon Petliura, who was in Warsaw at the time, was informed about his plan and agreed.

== Sources ==
- Landscape: A Window Into History (in Ukrainian), Information and Art Publication, November–December 2001
- Andriy Baylo. UGA's temporary alliance with the Dobrarmia and its consequences (in Ukrainian)
- Victor Krupina, This Day in History: Liberation of Kyiv by Ukrainian troops (in Ukrainian)
- The Kiev catastrophe of 1919… August 31, 2019 (in Ukrainian)
