= Max E. Coffey =

American politician

Max E. Coffey (born April 28, 1939) is an American politician who served as a member of the Illinois House of Representatives and the Illinois Senate.

== Biography ==
Coffey was born in Vermilion County, Illinois and educated in Kansas, Illinois. He attended Eastern Illinois University and then went into farming and became the owner-operator of Coffey's Flower Shop. In 1971, he was elected Township Supervisor for Charleston Township. At the time, this also made him a member of the Coles County Board.

In 1974, Coffey was elected to the Illinois House of Representatives. In 1976, Coffey ran for the Illinois Senate against Democratic candidate and Vermilion County State's Attorney Richard J. Doyle of Hoopeston. He won the election and served in the Illinois Senate until his resignation in January 1986. State Representative Harry "Babe" Woodyard was appointed to succeed Coffey in the Senate. Coffey was a delegate to 1982 Republican National Convention.

On January 13, 2016, Governor Bruce Rauner appointed Coffey a member of the Illinois Board of Higher Education. Coffey was confirmed by the Illinois Senate on May 23, 2016.
