= American death triangle =

Dangerous type of climbing anchor

The American Death Triangle, also known as the "American Triangle", "Triangle Anchor" or simply the "Death Triangle", is a dangerous type of rock and ice climbing anchor infamous for both magnifying load forces on fixed anchors and lack of redundancy in attachment to the anchor.

== Description ==
A two-point climbing anchor requires three carabiners: one at each fixed point and one at the "master point" where the load is transferred to the climbing rope. The aim is to distribute the force equally to each fixed point. A triangle anchor is formed by clipping a length of webbing or cord through all three carabiners, creating a shape which gives the dangerous anchor its descriptive name.

The force on each fixed point depends on the angle at the focal point. The following table lists the percentage of force transferred to the fixed point for various focal point angles, along with figures for a standard V-shaped anchor.

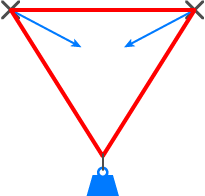
American death triangle showing the associated lines of force (in blue) acting on the anchors

Load per anchor based on a central, perpendicular load.
Bottom angle	Load per anchor (V arrangement)	Load per anchor (triangle arrangement)
0°	50%	70.71% (not physically possible)
5°	50.05%	72.31%
10°	50.19%	74.01%
30°	51.76%	82.13%
60°	57.74%	100%
90°	70.71%	130.66%
120°	100%	193.19%
150°	193.19%	383.06%

Table values are derived from vector analysis:

- For a V arrangement, $F_{\mathrm{Anchor}} = \frac {\mathrm{Weight}} {2 \cos(\frac 1 2 {\theta_\mathrm{Bottom}})} \approx \mathrm{Weight}\times 0.5 + O({\theta_\mathrm{Bottom}}^2)$

- For the Triangle, $F_{\mathrm{Anchor}} =\frac {\mathrm{Weight}} {2 \cos (45 ^{\circ} + \frac 1 4 {\theta_{\mathrm{Bottom}}} )} \approx\mathrm{Weight}\times 0.707 + O(\theta_{\mathrm{Bottom}})$

The load on the sling is the same in each example. For the V arrangement, the anchor force is equal to the tension in the sling, but for the triangle the anchor force is greater than the sling tension.

Aside from the magnification of forces, the death triangle violates several best practices for building climbing anchors, including

- Redundancy: if the webbing fails on one leg of the anchor, the entire anchor will fail.
- Extension: if one of the anchors fails, the webbing will extend its full length and shock load the remaining components of the system

An alternative V-shaped form of the death triangle involves clipping a single loop of webbing or cord to both anchors, then clipping the third carabiner over the loop rather than through it, allowing the latter to slip off the loop if either anchor fails. Two better methods are (a) putting a half twist in the cord and clipping the free carabiner through it. If either anchor fails, the free carabiner will remain attached to the cord but if the cord fails, the entire anchor still fails or (b) tying off both strands of the cord with e.g. an overhand knot achieving redundancy by sacrificing perfect equalization, since the length of the cord to each anchor is now fixed.

Special circumstances, such as when an experienced climber employs opposing forces to keep passive chocks, simple cams, or spring-loaded multiple camming devices in a crack, may call for a triangle. Even then, special provision must be made to provide redundancy and eliminate extension in the protection system.

== See also ==
- Rock climbing
- Load-sharing anchor
- Sling
