= Society for Imaging Science and Technology =

American scientific organization

The Society for Imaging Science and Technology (IS&T) is a professional society (a type of research and education organization) in the field of photography. Founded in 1947 as the Society of Photographic Scientists and Engineers (SPSE), it is headquartered in Springfield, Virginia. In 2018 it had about 850 members worldwide, and 5,000 participants in its various technical and industry-related programs.

IS&T is perhaps best known for its technical conferences and courses on various aspects of imaging science and technology, including digital imaging, digital printing, color imaging, photofinishing, archiving, and digital fabrication. The society publishes The Journal of Imaging Science and Technology and, in collaboration with SPIE, The Journal of Electronic Imaging. In 2018, IS&T introduced the open access Journal of Perceptual Imaging.

== See also ==
- Medical imaging
- International Commission for Optics
- Optical Society of America
- SPIE
