= Geared steam locomotive =

Steam railway locomotive with a geared transmission

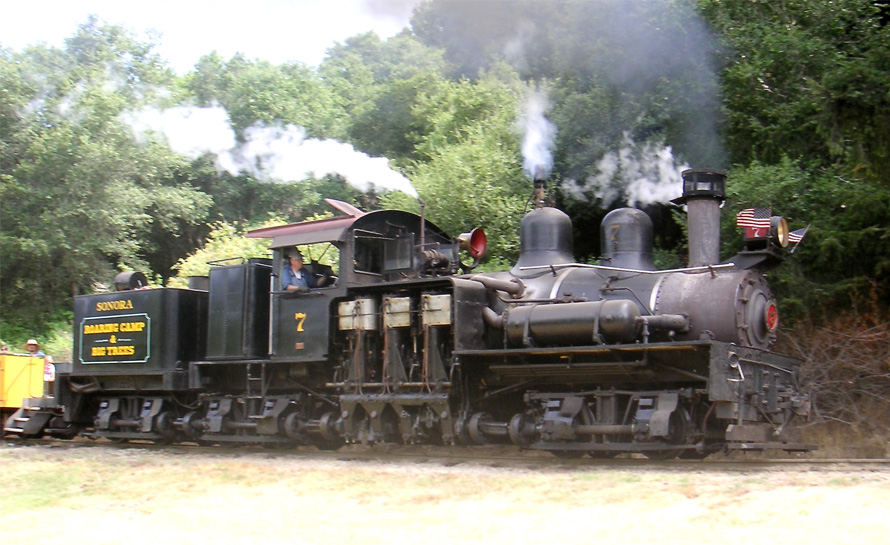
The Shay is among the most popular geared steam locomotives

A geared steam locomotive is a type of steam locomotive which uses gearing, usually reduction gearing, in the drivetrain, as opposed to the common directly driven design.

This gearing is part of the machinery within the locomotive and should not be confused with the pinion that propels a rack locomotive along the rack between the rails. The geared steam locomotives that have been built have been for conventional track, relying on the adhesion between wheels and rail.

Unlike conventional steam locomotives, they are not classified by their wheel arrangement. Instead, they are classified by their model and the number of trucks they have.

== Explanation and rationale ==
The steam locomotive, as commonly employed, has its pistons directly attached to cranks on the driving wheels; thus, there is no gearing, one revolution of the driving wheels is equivalent to one revolution of the crank and thus two power strokes per piston (steam locomotives are almost universally double-acting, unlike the more familiar internal combustion engine).

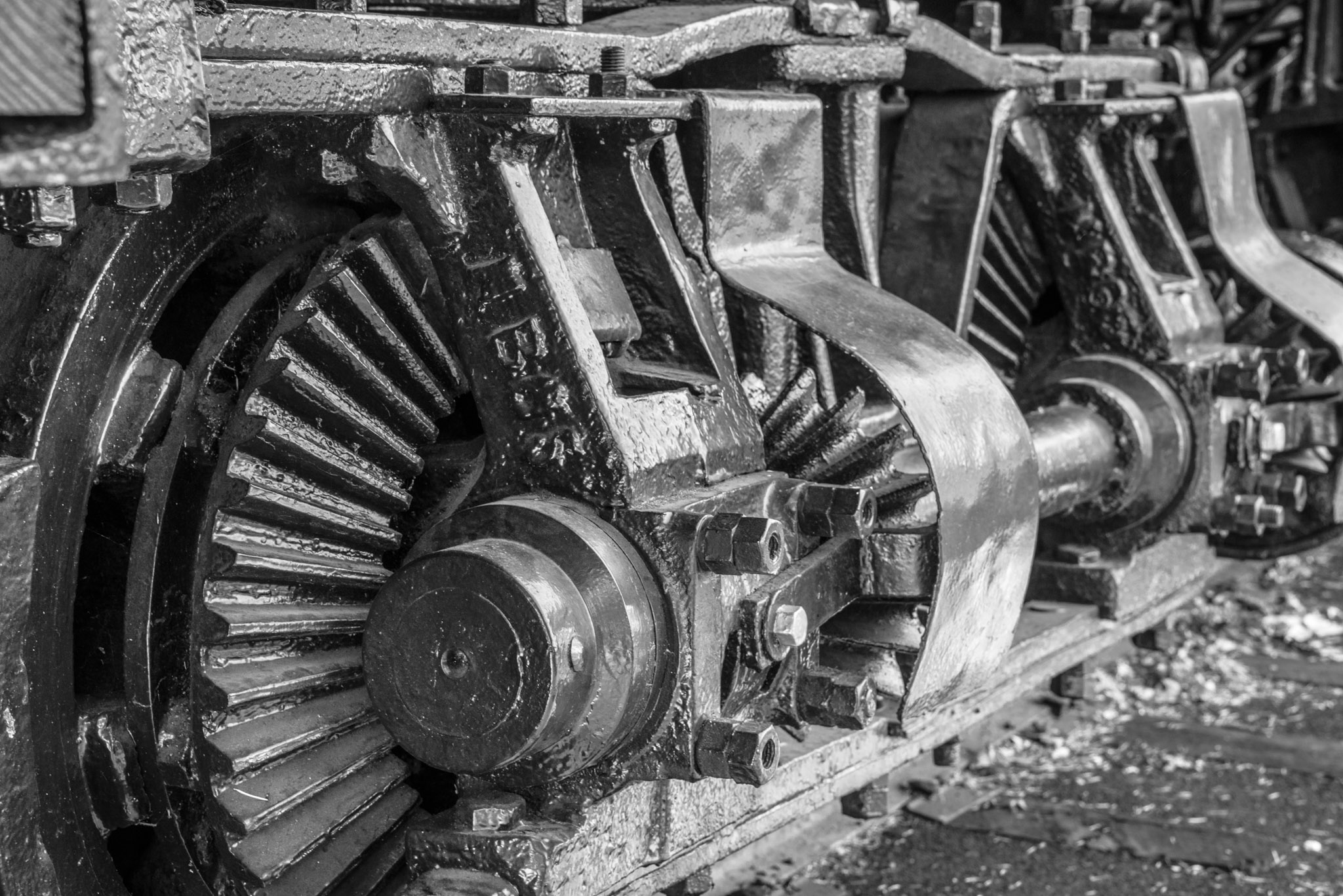
A wheel on a Shay locomotive. A shaft (seen towards the right of the photo) transferred power to a bevel gear (partially visible under a cover), which transferred power to the wheel.

The maximum rotational speed is fairly fixed for a given engine technology. Given the lack of any variable-ratio transmission between the piston engine and the wheels, the designer is forced to compromise between desired torque and desired maximum speed; the radius of the driving wheels determines this. The radius of the crank affixed to the wheel is of course less than this; its radius determines the length of the piston stroke. This cannot be too large, for the locomotive will be unable to generate enough steam to supply those large cylinders at speed; it cannot be too small, or the available starting torque and thus tractive effort will be too small, and the locomotive will not be able to start a train.

Many industrial applications require a low speed locomotive with ample starting tractive effort. These industries range from mining and quarry operations to forestry and logging operations. Steeply graded lines, especially when the track is cheaply built and not suited to high speeds, will also favour the usage of a locomotive with a high tractive effort. Although the trade-off of speed versus torque can be adjusted in favour of torque and tractive effort by reducing the size of the driving wheels, there is a practical limit below which this cannot be done without making the piston stroke too short on a directly-driven locomotive.

The solution is to separate the crank from the wheels, firstly allowing for a reasonable piston stroke and crank radius without requiring larger than desired driving wheels, and secondly allowing for reduction in rotational speed via gearing. Such a locomotive is a geared locomotive. Most were and are still single speed, but some did employ a variable-ratio gearbox and multiple ratios.

== Types of geared locomotive ==
The vast majority of geared locomotives in the world were built to one of three distinct designs, whether licensed and official, or clones built after the expiration of key patents. Of the types, the Shay locomotive was the most numerous and best known. The overwhelming majority operated on the North American region, but with a number in use in various parts of South America and a fair number in Australia and New Zealand, including home-developed types.

These were not the first locomotives to use geared transmission. Richard Trevithick's Coalbrookdale Locomotive used a large gear instead of side rods to link the crankshaft to the driving axles, with a net 1:1 gear ratio. The early Grasshopper (1832), Crab (1837) and Mud Digger (1842) locomotives built for the Baltimore and Ohio Railroad used gear ratios on the order of 2:1 so that each turn of the crankshaft caused about two turns of the driving axles. This allowed use of relatively small driving wheels without sacrificing speed.

=== The Shay locomotive ===
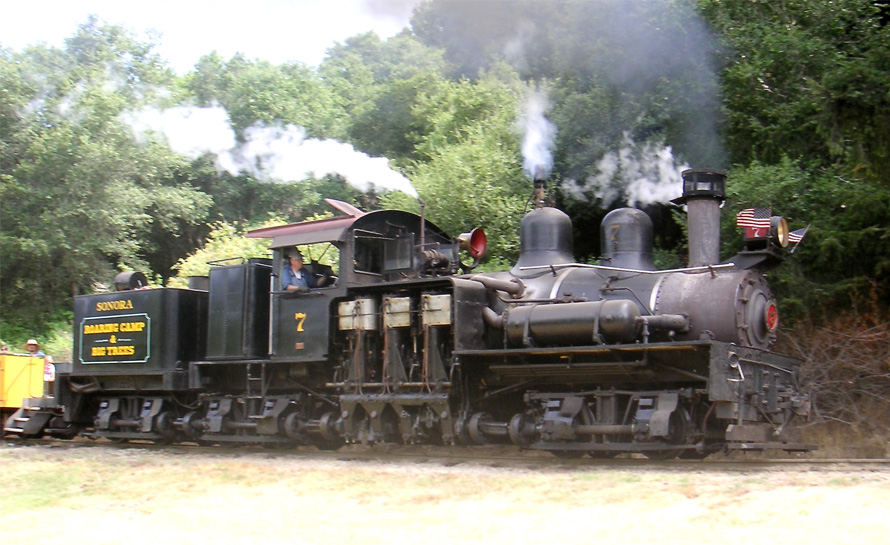
Class C Shay (three driven trucks)

The Shay locomotive features an offset boiler with a multiple-cylinder engine affixed to it on the opposite side, driving a longitudinal shaft geared to the axles via bevel gears (see also Ephraim Shay, inventor).

=== The Climax locomotive ===
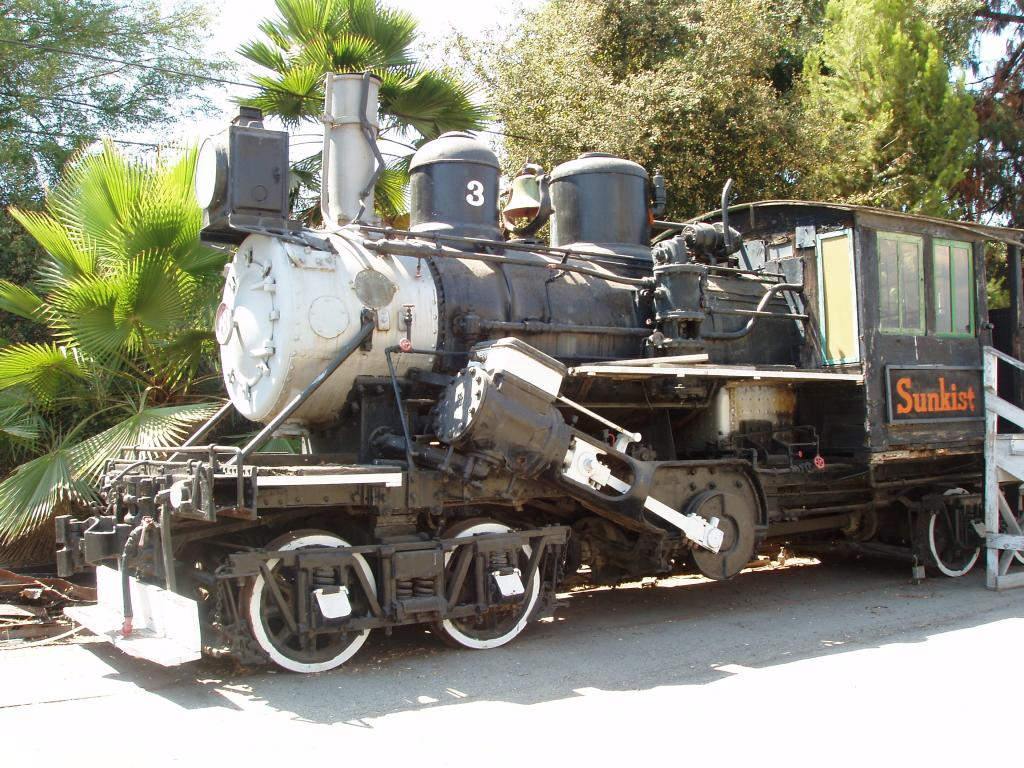
Class C Climax locomotive

Classes B and C Climax locomotives have two inclined cylinders driving a transverse crankshaft, geared to a longitudinal driveshaft placed centrally on the locomotive and driving the powered trucks via internal gearing.

There was also an earlier Class A Climax with a vertically mounted marine-type steam engine, working through a similar drive-line, via a two-speed gearbox.

=== The Heisler locomotive ===
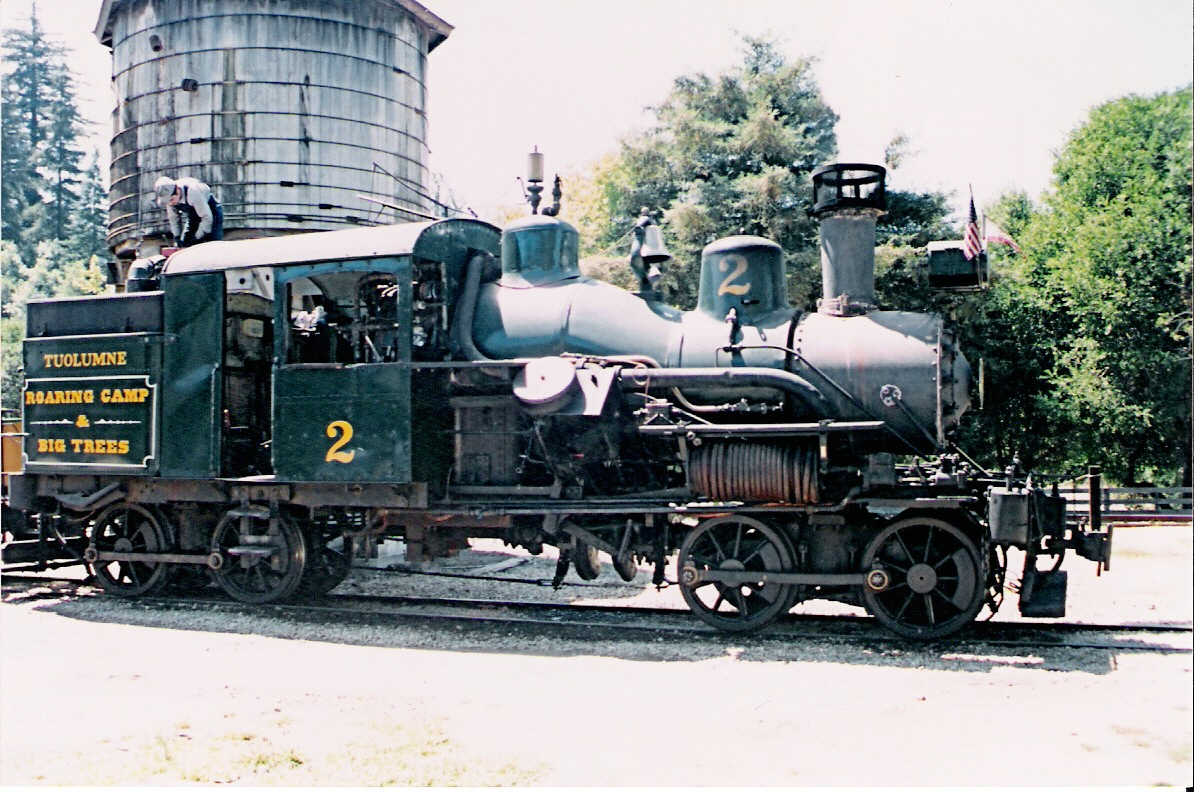
A Heisler locomotive — note cylinder location

The Heisler locomotive has a 'V-twin' style steam engine, one cylinder each side of the boiler, affixed to a centrally located longitudinal driveshaft, again geared to the wheels.

=== Other types ===
Besides the three main designs mentioned, there were other designs and clones:

- The Sentinel Waggon Works built numerous geared shunting locomotives to several designs mainly with vertical water-tube boilers and high-speed, enclosed, poppet-valve engines. These combined high-pressure boilers with high-reduction gearing to provide high torque at low speeds.
- The Willamette locomotive was an improved-upon clone of the Shay locomotive produced in limited number by Willamette Iron & Steel (better known for their steam donkey engines) after key patents expired. West coast logging customers were clamoring for improvements in detail design and the application of more modern locomotive technology to the geared locomotive; Lima (manufacturers of the Shay) were dragging their heels. The Willamette was the response to that.
- Davenport Locomotive Works held a series of patents for gearboxes designed to ride between the locomotive frames of side-rod locomotives, the first granted in 1913, had open gearing. Later improvements had fully enclosed gears. This was offered as both a single-speed and two-speed transmission, and it was used in four-coupled and six-coupled side-rod locomotives, with the crankshaft input to the gearbox just behind the rear driver. Larger articulated locomotives were built with 2 4-coupled geared trucks, with the cylinders at the inboard ends and gearboxes outboard. Davenport advertised these locomotives for industrial, quarry and logging use.
- The Bell Locomotive Works sold a line of small industrial locomotives based on modular, fully enclosed 2-cylinder "steam motors" geared to the drive axles.
- A&G Price of Thames, New Zealand built a number of geared locomotives, often home-grown variants of the Climax A, Climax B or Heisler types. They did however produce a type that is known as the "16-wheeler" (0-4-4-4-4-0) that was also produced by another NZ manufacturer, Johnson Brothers of Invercargill. Price's last steam engine was a Heisler locomotive, built 3 years after the last American Heisler was built.
- Aveling and Porter built a few geared locomotives which were, essentially, traction engines with flanged wheels. The early ones used sprocket chain drive but later versions had spur gears.
- The Avonside Engine Company produced a small number of narrow-gauge geared steam locomotives for sugar cane plantations in Natal. These were similar in design to Heislers.
- The Kitson-Still locomotive used different ends of the same cylinders for steam or diesel propulsion. The crank was above the frame and a gear train of fixed reduction linked it to the centre axle.
- In 1899, the Wiener Lokomotivfabrik, Floridsdorf, Austria produced the narrow-gauge geared steam cog locomotives operated on the Achensee Railway.
- Vertical boilered "coffee-pot" locomotives were often geared, though those made by De Winton were not.

== Today ==
With the decline of the commercial use of steam traction, the commercial use of geared locomotives has similarly reduced.

Some geared steam locomotives are still at work in the sugar plantations of Indonesia, and no doubt elsewhere too, but in most countries they may now be seen only on tourist lines, preservation sites and museums. These locomotives' particular advantage in cane sugar operations is their ability to use the dried solid residue of pressing the cane (see bagasse) as a fuel of trivial cost, providing that low cost technical labor is available to maintain the locomotives.

=== Australia ===
- Puffing Billy Railway in Victoria, Australia:
  - Class B Climax 1694. Purchased by the Forests Commission Victoria in 1928 for hauling logs on the Tyers Valley timber tramway which branched off the Moe-Walhalla railway east of Melbourne. After decommissioning the locomotive in the early 1950s it was stored (abandoned) at the State Sawmill site at Erica until it was transferred to Puffing Billy's museum for static display in 1965. Restored to steam by the Puffing Billy Railway in the 1980s. A major overhaul has been finished and it returned to service Sunday 8 September 2013.
  - Lima-built Shay locomotive from the Ali-shan railway in Taiwan, although it has not yet been restored.

=== Canada ===
- The Canada Science and Technology Museum in Ottawa, Ontario has an operational 50 short tons (45 long tons; 45 t) class B Shay Locomotive, that is in operation Sundays and Wednesdays in July and August.
- The British Columbia Forest Discovery Centre in Duncan, British Columbia. Shays - Lima shop numbers 2475 (display) and 3147 (out of service pending boiler work). Climax shop numbers 1057 (display) and 1359 (operational).

=== Indonesia ===
Wide variety of types still in use at sugar mills. Most are long wheelbase 0-10-0 locomotives that use an articulation technique incorporating a geared drive to the outer-most axles, the inner pair being direct-drive.

=== New Zealand ===
- Shantytown, West Coast:
  - Heisler, makers no. 1494 (unrestored)
  - Climax, makers no.1203 (out of service pending overhaul)
- The Pukemiro Line, Pukemiro:
  - Heisler, makers no. 1063 (parts only. Engine unit and 2 bogies)
  - Heisler, makers no. 1082 (awaiting overhaul)
  - Climax, makers no. 1650 (under restoration 2014)
  - Price Cb 117 (Class A Climax clone, restored, operational)
  - Price E 111 (Class B Climax clone, under static restoration 2014)
- "Steam Scene", Christchurch:
  - Price V 148 (Heisler clone, operational)

Te Awamutu "Climax, makers no. 1317 (under static restoration 2014)

- "Ferrymead Heritage Park", Christchurch:
  - Heisler, makers no. 1450 (unrestored)
  - Price Cb 113 (Class A Climax clone, restored)
- Mawhera Reserve, Red Jacks, beside SH7, unrestored G & D Davidson 1913 0-4-4-0

=== United Kingdom ===
About 30 Sentinels and a few Aveling & Porters have been preserved. A few examples are shown below:

- Buckinghamshire Railway Centre:
  - two Aveling & Porters
  - two Sentinels
- Embsay and Bolton Abbey Steam Railway
  - one Sentinel
- Northamptonshire Ironstone Railway Trust
  - two Sentinels
- Rushden, Higham and Wellingborough Railway
  - One Aveling & Porter

The Aveling & Porter 2-2-0WT Blue Circle has changed ownership many times. Last known location - Wansford, Nene Valley Railway.

=== United States ===
No geared steam locomotives remain in commercial use in America. However, several are in operation on tourist lines.

- The Cass Scenic Railroad State Park in West Virginia uses only geared locomotives, and features the largest remaining and last Shay locomotive ever built, the 162-ton former Western Maryland Railway #6. The railroad also owns a Climax locomotive and a Heisler, enabling all three types to be seen.
- The Roaring Camp and Big Trees Narrow Gauge Railroad in Felton, California, has several operational Shays, a seldom-operated Heisler, and a Climax awaiting restoration.
- The White Mountain Central Railroad at Clark's Trading Post in Lincoln, New Hampshire, operates Climax #6, built in 1920 (builder number 1603), on its tourist line. Clark's also has the last remaining Shay in New England. The Shay is non-operational but in storage. Clark's also has a 32-ton Heisler locomotive that is awaiting staybolt replacement.
- A 65-ton 1922 Lima locomotive with three-truck Shay design is on static display at the Travel Town open-air museum in Los Angeles.
- The Southeastern Railway Museum in Duluth, Georgia, has a two-truck Heisler (#9) lovingly restored on static display inside the main exhibit hall. The Heisler is painted for the Campbell Limestone Co and is in excellent condition.
- At the Mount Rainier Scenic Railroad in Washington state, a 99-ton West Fork Logging Heisler #91 is operational, a 70-ton Hillcrest Lumber Climax #10 is operational, a 95-ton Pickering Lumber Shay #11 is awaiting boiler work, and a 75-ton Rayonier Company Willamette #2 is operational and is the only Willamette operating.
- The Silver Creek and Stephenson Railroad in Freeport, Illinois. Heisler shop number 1260 in operation.
- The Durbin & Greenbrier Valley Railroad in Durbin, West Virginia. Climax shop number 1059 in operation.
- The Sumpter Valley Railroad in Baker City, Oregon. Heisler shop #1306 in operation.
- The Oregon Coast Scenic Railroad in Garibaldi, Oregon. Heisler shop #1198 in operation.
- The Foster Brook & State Line Railroad in Bradford, Pennsylvania. 2 ft (610 mm) narrow-gauge Shay (Lima Locomotive Works shop #3118) operational. Not available to the public.
- The Georgetown Loop Railroad in Georgetown, Colorado. Shay (Lima Locomotive Works shop #3199) operational.
- The Yosemite Mountain Sugar Pine Railroad in Sugar Pine, California.
- The Hesston Steam Museum in Hesston, Indiana has an operational Shay locomotive that was first restored in 1975. It was severely damaged in the 1985 fire, but restored again between 2000 and 2006 in time for the foundation's 50th anniversary. Restoration has since continued, and "The Big Shay" will begin offering rides to museum patrons the weekend of August 5, 2023.

=== Taiwan ===
The Alishan Forest Railway in Taiwan operated 22 Shay locomotives in the past, with the oldest dating to 1910. Sixteen of the original 22 have been preserved, with 3 in operational condition and 1 preserved on the Puffing Billy Railway.

== See also ==
- Cass Scenic Railroad State Park
- Glossary of steam locomotive components
- Steam donkey
- Steam motor
