= Freedomland U.S.A. =

Theme park in New York City (1960–1964)

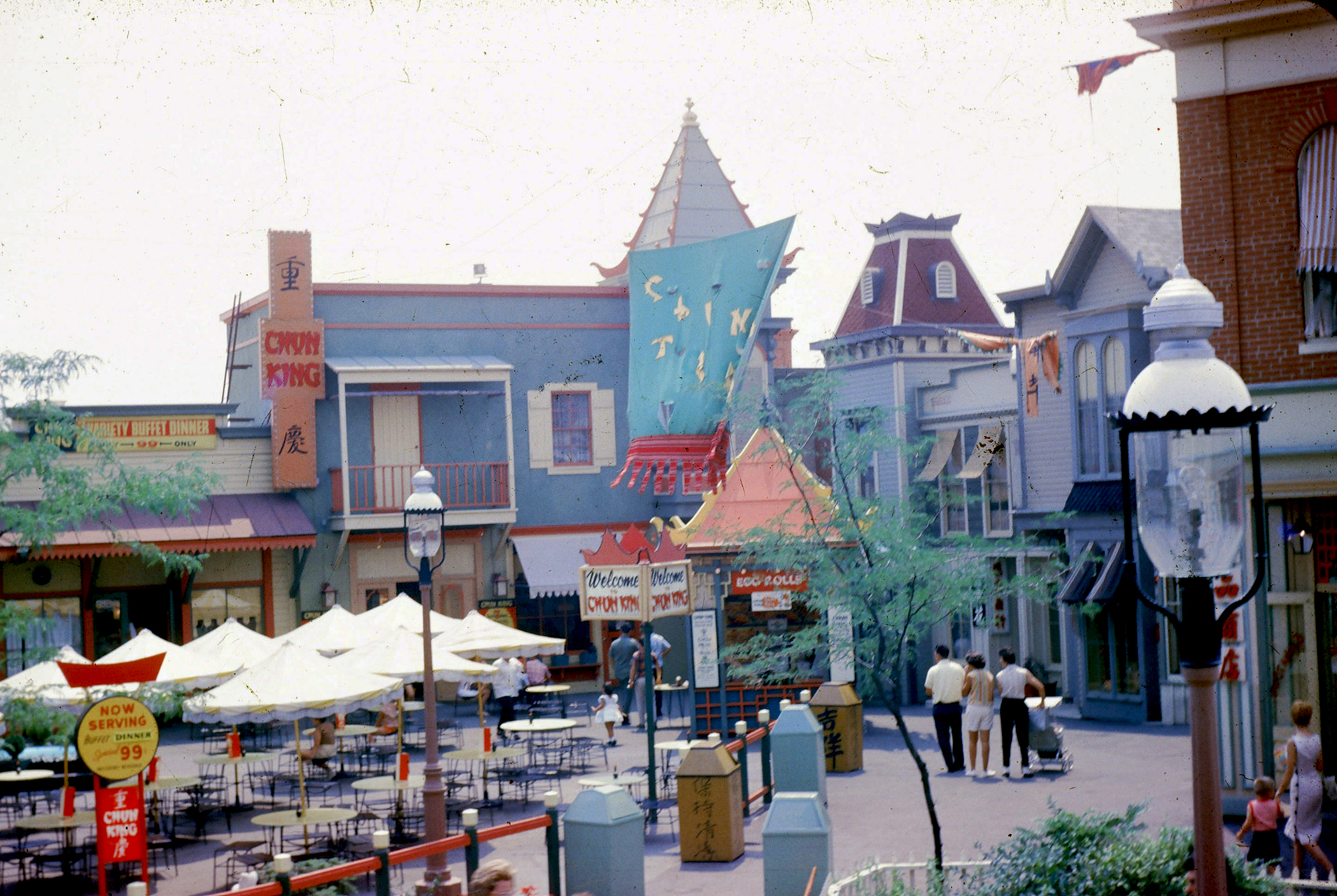
- Chinatown in the San Francisco section
- Interactive map of Freedomland U.S.A.
- Location: Baychester, Bronx, New York, United States
- Coordinates: 40°52′19″N 73°49′39″W
- Status: Defunct
- Opened: June 19, 1960; 66 years ago
- Closed: September 13, 1964; 61 years ago
- Owner: Webb and Knapp (including subsidiaries National Development Corporation and Freedomland, Inc.)
- Operated by: Webb and Knapp
- Theme: American history
- Slogan: The World's Newest and Largest Outdoor Entertainment Center; The World's Largest Entertainment Center; The World's Largest Family Entertainment Center; The World's Largest Outdoor Entertainment Center
- Area: 85 acres (34 ha)

Attractions
- Total: 40+

Freedomland U.S.A. (often shortened to Freedomland) was a theme park dedicated to American history in the Baychester section of the North Bronx in New York City, United States. Freedomland was built on marshland owned by the Webb and Knapp company, of which William Zeckendorf Sr. was the major owner. Zeckendorf announced his plans for Freedomland in May 1959. The park, conceived and built by C. V. Wood, consisted of over 40 attractions arranged in the shape of a large map of the contiguous United States. Groundbreaking ceremonies for Freedomland occurred in late 1959, and Freedomland opened to large crowds on June 19, 1960.

Because of Freedomland's $65 million construction cost, the park faced financial issues; by the end of the 1961 season, Freedomland had $8 million in debt. To generate revenue, the park added more exhibits and conventional amusements. By 1963, further financial issues led the owners to sell off a portion of Freedomland's site to a pension fund of the Teamsters, as well as close off a section of the park. Even though Freedomland's planners anticipated that the park would eventually be developed into a full-time amusement area, Freedomland closed permanently at the end of the 1964 season, filing for bankruptcy on September 14, 1964.

In the late 1960s and early 1970s, part of the Freedomland site was redeveloped as the Co-op City housing development. The Bay Plaza Shopping Center was built on another part of the site. Many Freedomland attractions and design features were auctioned or sold to other parks, and many of these rides no longer exist. While little physical evidence of Freedomland remains, several media works commemorate the former amusement park.

== Creation ==
Freedomland was conceived and built by C. V. Wood, a Texan who had worked in the planning, construction, and management of Disneyland, which opened in Anaheim, California, in 1955. After Disneyland's opening, Wood's relationship with Walt and Roy Disney became strained because of various disputes, and he was ousted from Disneyland management by early 1956. He soon became involved in the creation of other amusement parks across the United States under his company Marco Engineering. Wood had devised plans for an American-history theme park as early as 1957, in conjunction with Milton Ted Raynor, who later became president of Freedomland Inc. The new theme park would be themed entirely around American history, in a more historically accurate version of the Disneyland layout, which initially included four distinct areas: Adventureland, Tomorrowland, Fantasyland, and Frontierland.

=== Site ===
Location of Freedomland U.S.A.

Two consultants at Marco Engineering performed a feasibility study for the location of Wood's proposed American-history theme park. By late 1958, Wood had pitched his American-history park concept to the Webb and Knapp development company. Early the next year, a site was selected: a portion of a 400-acre (160 ha) plot owned by Webb and Knapp in the northeast Bronx section of New York City. The site, in the Baychester neighborhood, was a former municipal landfill, originally marshland fed by Rattlesnake Creek and the Hutchinson River. This led to a profusion of mosquitoes during certain periods of the year. The International Recreation Corporation (IRC) was incorporated in Boston in April 1959 to oversee development of a park there.

Webb and Knapp's principal owner, William Zeckendorf, announced the plans for Freedomland on April 30, 1959. Webb and Knapp subsidiary National Development Corporation (NDC), along with IRC subsidiary Freedomland Inc., were created to operate and manage the theme park. Wood and IRC president Peter De Met announced further details of the proposed park at a press conference that May. According to Wood and De Met, the park was to cover 205 acres (83 ha) and would fit up to 32,000 visitors. About 85 acres (34 ha) would be developed for the park itself, and 125 acres (51 ha) would house parking, maintenance areas, and other service areas. There would also be a 12,000-spot parking lot and a 600-room motel. In mid-1959, Freedomland Inc. leased the site for 50 years. IRC issued about one million shares, which were then sold to NDC and Freedomland Inc. The IRC offered 580,000 shares to the public in July 1959 at $17.50 per share, and the stock offering was quickly oversubscribed; this raised $17 million. Under the terms of the lease agreement, the park was to pay an annual rent of $600,000 for the first five years, $750,000 for the next ten years, and $1 million thereafter. Wood presented further details for the park to Zeckendorf and his son William Zeckendorf Jr. later the same year.

=== Construction ===
A groundbreaking ceremony for Freedomland was initially planned for July 4, 1959, coinciding with Independence Day, but ultimately occurred on August 26, 1959. The ceremony featured a helicopter ride over the premises for the park's backers, special New York City Subway train for attendees, and various performances. Fifty bulldozers, representing every U.S. state, were exhibited at the groundbreaking ceremony. Despite these lavish preparations, only 19 members of the public attended the ceremony.

Over the next months, more than 2,000 workers were hired, mostly by the two major contractors, Turner Construction and Aberthaw Construction. Work was completed within just under 300 days. Some 10 acres (4.0 ha) of land were excavated to create 10.2 million US gallons (39 million litres) of canals. Land was raised by up to 50 feet (15 m) to create the park's natural-looking features. Billboard magazine reported that the park was to have between 33 and 35 rides on opening day, as well as more than 80 commercial tenants who funded the construction of their own attractions. Major contractors were hired to furnish the props and attractions, including flat-ride manufacturer Arrow Dynamics, souvenir manufacturer Enco National Corporation, concessionaire The Brass Rail, and sternwheeler manufacturer Todd Shipyards. Frederic V. Schumacher was hired as the park's general manager in September 1959. In addition, Ellington and Co. was hired to manage advertising for the park, Sylvester Weaver Jr. oversaw radio and television coverage of the park, while Douglas Leigh was hired as the park's lighting consultant. Allen Hixon was hired in early 1960 to design the park's layout.

The construction contractors had finished the foundations of 15 structures by November 1959. The park's construction was facilitated by mild weather during the winter of 1959–1960, and forty-two buildings were in various states of completion by February 1960. On March 24, six small unfinished buildings were destroyed by fire and were razed; this did not affect progress on the rest of the park. The burned structures were reused as props for Freedomland's Chicago Fire attraction. Freedomland's opening was originally set for June 1, 1960. Advertising agent Edward Weiner wished to invite politicians such as the administration of U.S. president Dwight D. Eisenhower; all members of the U.S. Congress; the governors of all 50 U.S. states; and United Nations delegates to the park's opening. The opening was postponed to July 1 so the park could be ready for the expected crowds, then rescheduled again to June 18 due to high excitement generated by the marketing campaign. Journalists were invited to preview the park on April 28, 1960, and the park's managers arranged for the popular TV series The Ed Sullivan Show to be broadcast from there on June 18.

=== Opening ===
When announced, Freedomland was supposed to cost $15.5 million, funded by Freedomland Inc.'s stock issues. The final cost was significantly higher, at $65 million; the land was valued at $30 million and the scenery another $33 million. The eateries comprised another $1 million of the cost. The actual theme park consisted of 85 acres (340,000 m^{2}) of the 205-acre site leased by the IRC. Prior to opening day, Freedomland launched an aggressive advertising campaign. The first phase, targeting the 10 million people living within 50 miles (80 km) of New York City, consisted of daily advertisements in the city's newspapers, radio and TV stations, and subway cars. Advertisements were found as far away as 100 miles (160 km) from the Bronx, and several contests and promotions for Freedomland were held in the greater New York City area. Several advertising taglines were devised for Freedomland, including "The World's Newest and Largest Outdoor Entertainment Center", "The World's Largest Entertainment Center", "The World's Largest Family Entertainment Center", and "The World's Largest Outdoor Entertainment Center". Marketers also used the generic slogan "A World of Fun for Everyone", but they discarded another tagline, "Freedomland is fifty states of happiness!". A promotional Freedomland jingle was developed.

On June 18, 1960, Freedomland was dedicated with a ceremony in front of the Chicago-themed railroad station; about 25,000 people attended the dedication, which raised funds for local youth programs. The following day, June 19, the park officially opened. To draw more visitors, Freedomland started a second advertising campaign on that day, targeting ten major populated areas within a radius of 125 miles (201 km). People lined up to get into the park two and a half hours before its official 9:00 a.m. opening. Pat Boone cut the ribbon at 8:30 a.m., and by noon, radio announcers were warning people not to go to Freedomland because of severe parking shortages and overfilled parking lots. By 2:05 p.m., Freedomland stopped selling tickets due to traffic jams on highways and local roads leading to the park. Ultimately, the park recorded 61,500 visitors, one-third less than the expected maximum capacity, and closed at 9:00 p.m., three hours before its intended closing.

On opening day, one security guard was quoted as saying that the drinking fountains were non-functional, the restrooms were few and far between, the concessionaires were poorly equipped for operation, and many exhibits were not yet painted or decorated. The park had a much smaller crowd on its second day of operation when it had an average of 15,000 visitors throughout the day. Satellite City and the Chicago Fire were not operational until a few weeks after opening day, the former due to "electrical difficulties". In total, Freedomland was only 85 percent complete at the time of its opening. Parts of the original proposal, such as a Freedomland Inn and a movie studio, were never completed. Admission was on a sliding scale between $0.50 and $1, based on age group. Members of the United States Armed Forces paid 75 cents. The admission fee only covered entry to the park; each of the 35 rides had an additional surcharge of 10 to 50 cents. Patrons could also buy coupon books for nine rides, which cost between $2.50 and $3.50. At some point during the first season, adult admission was increased to $1.50.

== Areas and attractions ==
Pre-opening map of Freedomland U.S.A.

Under Wood's leadership, Freedomland's designers created a history-themed concept, divided into seven themed areas based on the history of the United States. Each section featured attractions, shops, and restaurants fitting that section's theme. The layout resembled a large map of the contiguous United States and was designed like a movie set. As guests entered from the parking lot, they walked into Little Old New York of the 1890s. Baychester Avenue and the New England Thruway at the park's western edge approximately represented Freedomland's border with Canada. The designers added decor such as vintage building advertisements and a night-lighting system. Freedomland's attractions on opening day were significantly different from what had originally been planned. Of the 16 areas and attractions announced in an August 1959 press release, 12 were operating on opening day, some of which were themed to a completely different time span than in the original plan. As conceived, the park also focused on history from a narrow era, between roughly 1850 and 1900.

The park could accommodate up to 32,000 visitors at once or 90,000 visitors per day. The premises included 8 miles (13 km) of navigable waterways and lakes, 10,000 newly planted trees, more than 18 restaurants and snack bars, and parking for 7,200 cars for guests and 1,800 for employees. The park included 35,000 shrubs. Freedomland's operators acquired 80 burros, 200 horses, six stagecoaches, canoes, and saddles to make the park seem more realistic. At Freedomland's opening, there were 41 attractions, as well as performances reenacted by over 2,000 cast members. The park had its own fire department, as well as a dedicated police department with 110 officers. Performance programs were designed to be interactive: for instance, children were enlisted to participate in fighting a reenacted Great Chicago Fire. Freedomland hosted a competition for its official hostess, "Miss Freedomland", every season; according to the New York Amsterdam News, these hostesses "have gone on to lucrative careers in fashion and television modeling".

None of the rides on opening day were traditional amusement park attractions such as roller coasters. As attendance failed to meet the operators' expectations, generic fairground attractions were added to the park in subsequent opening seasons, and the park had 45 rides and over 200 programs by 1962. As at Disneyland, many of Freedomland's attractions received corporate sponsorships, and alcoholic beverages were banned in Freedomland.

=== Transportation ===
The site was accessible from the rest of the city via the New York City Subway's Pelham Bay Park station, served by the 6 and <6> trains, and the Gun Hill Road station, served by the 5 train. Furthermore, the presence of several highways, such as the New England Thruway, made the site accessible from the surrounding New York metropolitan area, whose population exceeded 10 million. Express bus service ran to Manhattan and the Pelham Bay Park and Gun Hill Road subway stations. For the wealthy, Flotair operated a seaplane service that could reach Manhattan in five minutes.

==== Intra-park transport ====
Freedomland U.S.A. had a railroad and an aerial lift ride carrying passengers between different parts of the park. The 2 ft (610 mm) narrow gauge Santa Fe Railroad traveled between the park's Chicago and San Francisco areas. The ride was approximately six minutes long and consisted of a loop stretching about 1 mile (1.6 km). The park leased two locomotives named Monson No. 3 and Monson No. 4, as well as passenger coaches and flatbeds, from the Edaville Railroad in Massachusetts; the rolling stock was transported back to the Edaville Railroad via truck between seasons.

A two-passenger double Von Roll (VR101) sky ride, the Tucson Mining Company Sky Ride, traveled between the Old Southwest and Old Chicago sections of the park. The ride used 64 gondolas manufactured by Gangloff Cabins, supposedly obtained from the 1958 Brussels World's Fair, and designed as replicas of ore cars. The attraction contained two extended cables, which ran in a loop. For the 1960 and 1961 seasons, the sky ride was a round trip only, but starting in 1962, guests could board at Chicago.

=== Little Old New York (1850–1900) ===
The Little Old New York section, at the north end of the park, was closest to the main entrance and contained an information booth, stroller rental, and lockers. It depicted New York City as it appeared in the late 19th century. Attractions included:

Attraction name	Description	Refs.
Horseless Carriage	An antique car ride in a 1909 model Cadillac through the New England countryside.	
Tug boats Totsie and Pert	A boat ride from New York Harbor.	
Horse-drawn trolley	Operated on tracks and traveled from New York to the Old Chicago area.	
The Bank of New York	A working bank branch that doubled as an exhibit about currency.	

Restaurants and refreshments included Borden's Old Fashioned Ice Cream Parlor; F&M Schaefer Brewery, an old-fashioned brewery sponsored by Schaefer Beer; Kandy King Candy Shop; Lipton's Inn and Lipton's Tea House; New York Coffee House; and Welch's Grape Juice Bar, a beverage bar located near the New England vineyard.

Shops included a print shop to purchase vintage-style posters, an apothecary shop, a glass blower shop, and other stores. Unlike Disneyland, where the shops were connected to each other, the stores were generally separated internally, like actual shops on city streets. Macy's recreated its original Manhattan store, Macy's Herald Square. There was also a live street show that included a German band, an 1880s Tammany Hall speech, a political pep rally, campaigning suffragettes, and a New York gangland robbery of the Little Old New York Bank.

=== Old Chicago (1871) ===
The Old Chicago section was located on the park's western border, south of Old New York. One of the main geographical features of Old Chicago was an imitation of the Great Lakes. This water body was 6 feet (1.8 m) deep, covered a surface area of 10 acres (4.0 ha), and could hold 10,000,000 U.S. gallons (38,000,000 L).

Attractions included:

Attraction name	Description	Refs.
The Chicago Fire	At scheduled times, a Chicago building would "burn" and the flames were extinguished by character actors portraying firemen along with volunteers from among park guests using the vintage 1800s water pumper. The attraction was based on the Great Chicago Fire of 1871.	
Chippewa War Canoes	An attraction where guests paddled one of five 19-passenger canoes led by Native American guides. Operated 1960–1961.	
Great Lakes Cruise	A boat ride along the Great Lakes on one of two 110-foot, 400-passenger sternwheeler boats with calliopes.	
Indian Village	A teepee village with Native Americans creating handicrafts for sale and showcasing traditional dances. It was moved to the Great Plains after a few seasons.	
Santa Fe Railroad station	A railroad station.	
State Fair Midway	A series of more typical amusement rides, including a Meteor Monorail roller coaster from Mack Rides; an Astro Ride; a Bumper Scooter; a go-kart track; and a Wiggle Worm. A kids' section was included, with a junior Santa Fe train and several other rides for small children. A dock was added for the New York Harbor Tug Boats. Operated during 1962–1964.	

Restaurants and refreshments included the Brass Rail Stockyards Restaurant, a steak restaurant. This was the largest restaurant in Freedomland with over 300 seats. Shops included the Hallmark Card Shop, a store that sold souvenir postcards, which also served as Freedomland's communication center. There was also the Relic Shop, a souvenir shop located near the Chicago Fire attraction.

=== The Great Plains (1803–1900) ===
The Great Plains section was located south of Old Chicago. Attractions included:

Attraction name	Description	Refs.
Borden's Barn Boudoir	A fully furnished apartment for the Borden Company's mascot, Elsie the Cow.	
Borden's Farm	A working farm exhibit that included horses, cows, sheep, pigs, poultry, corn and hay.	
Cavalry Rifles	A shooting gallery.	
Fort Cavalry	A log-by-log replica of a U.S. Army stockade.	
Fort Cavalry Stage Line	A stage coach ride past a buffalo herd and through the Rocky Mountains that included a mock robbery by actors portraying outlaws. A driver and four horses led each of the coaches, and between four and eight coaches were reportedly used.	
Mule-Go-Round	A merry-go-round pulled by western mules.	
Pony Express	A rider would pick up a message at the office and deliver it to The Old Southwest section for pick-up by the park guest.	

Restaurants and refreshments included Borden's Milk Bar, a beverage bar, and Chuck Wagon Snack Stand, a snack bar.

=== San Francisco (1906) ===
The San Francisco section was located at the south end of the park. Attractions included:

Attraction name	Description	Refs.
Barbary Coast	A recreation of San Francisco's entertainment district.	
Chinatown	A recreation of San Francisco's Chinatown, with shops and a Chinese restaurant sponsored by Chun King. There were also two inoperative junks that were built in Hong Kong.	
Hollywood Arena	An amphitheater added in 1961, with animal acts and large-scale human stunts, it also featured appearances from New York City children's television personalities such as Wonderama host Sonny Fox, WPIX-TV's Officer Joe Bolton, Super Circus ringmaster Claude Kirchner and WNEW-TV's Uncle Fred Scott.	
Horse-Drawn Surreys	A transportation ride to the Southwest area.	
Northwest Fur Trapper	A boat ride adventure through Lewis and Clark territory, similar to Disneyland's Jungle Cruise.	
Santa Fe Railroad station	A railroad station.	
San Francisco Earthquake	A dark ride made by Arrow Dynamics, which simulated the 1906 San Francisco earthquake.	
Seal Pool	A display of actual Pacific harbor seals.	

Restaurants and refreshments included Chun-King Shangri-La Restaurant, located in the replica Chinatown, and Fisherman's Wharf, a snack stand with an actor dressed as an old salt seaman telling stories. A&W Root Beer, an exhibit and restaurant sponsored by A&W Root Beer, operated only from 1962 to 1964. Shops included a souvenir shop called Indian Trading Post and an Italian restaurant with attached gift shop.

=== The Old Southwest (1890) ===
The Old Southwest section was located on the eastern border of the park, north of Old San Francisco. Attractions included:

Attraction name	Description	Refs.
Burro Trail	An outdoor ride across the park's Rocky Mountains on actual burros.	
Casa Loca	A walk-through crooked house that appeared to defy the law of gravity (a "gravity hill").	
Gunfight	A live street show with actors engaged in a Western gun fight.	
Mine Caverns	A dark ride on an underground mine train through lava pits that revealed giant bats and cave creatures. Fourteen ride vehicles were used, with four passengers per vehicle.	
Texas Longhorns	An actual herd of steers.	
Tucson Mining Company	The gondola ride.	

Restaurants and refreshments included a Mexican restaurant called Libby's Hacienda, or Libby's Frito House, which served quick service meals, along with several "specials" that included Fritos. There was also the Santa Fe Opera House and Saloon, a soft drink bar that featured a 30-minute stage show with a four-piece band, showgirls, singers and comedians. Some of New York City's radio disc jockeys and program hosts would broadcast from the stage. There were two souvenir shops: the Mexican Market and the Western Trading Post.

=== New Orleans – Mardi Gras ===
The New Orleans – Mardi Gras section was located north of the Old Southwest. Attractions included:

Attraction name	Description	Refs.
Buccaneers	A pirate-themed boat ride based on the original plans for Disney's Pirates of the Caribbean ride.	
Civil War	A horse-drawn correspondents wagon under a flag of truce brought park guests through recreations of American Civil War battle grounds, camps, derailed trains and burning houses. It ended at the surrender at Old Appomattox Court House.	
Crystal Maze	The world's first glass-walled house of mirrors maze.	
Danny the Dragon	A tram-like ride on the tail of a 74-foot (23 m) long fire breathing dragon through Storybook Land. Freedomland had a green Danny and a red Danny.	
Kandy Kane Lane	A children's play area with a helicopter ride, a swan boat ride, a toy fair and a sand pile.	
King Rex Carrousel	A Dentzel merry-go-round dated to circa 1912.	
Popeye Museum	Museum themed to the cartoon character Popeye. Operated 1962 only.	
Pirate Gun Gallery	A shooting gallery	
Spin-A-Top	A spinning ride similar to Disney's Mad Tea Cups ride, with 18 "tops" on three turntables.	
Tornado Adventure	A dark ride that simulated driving though a Tornado Alley twister.	
Wax Museum	A wax museum brought from the Century 21 Exposition in Seattle. Operated 1963–1964.	

Restaurants and refreshments included Jesse Jewell Plantation House Restaurant, a food service area that served fried chicken. There was also the Mardi Gras Sidewalk Cafe and the Jolly Roger snack area. Shops included the Carousel Toy Shop, next to the King Rex Carrousel.

=== Satellite City – The Future ===
The Satellite City – The Future section was located at the southeast section of the park. Attractions included:

Attraction name	Description	Refs.
Blast-Off Bunker	An authentic reproduction of a Cape Canaveral control room in which visitors could witness a simulated rocket launch from start to finish.	
Braniff Space Rover	A simulation of a space journey in a 250-seat theatre designed to appear as a spaceship.	
Moon Bowl	A stage and 15,000-square-foot (1,400 m^{2}) dance floor that featured celebrity performers and guests. Operated 1961–1964.	
Moving Lake Walk	An automated moving sidewalk across a man-made lake. The lake was removed and replaced by the Moon Bowl for the 1961 season, but the sidewalk remained.	
Satellite City Turnpike	A miniature auto ride in futuristic cars.	
Special exhibits about modern science and industry.		

Restaurants and refreshments included the Satellite City Snack Bar, as well as a Coca-Cola soft-drink bar.

=== Unbuilt areas and attractions ===
There were several unbuilt areas and attractions. One area near New Orleans and Satellite City would have recreated the Florida peninsula. Plans were also drawn up for a replica of a Hollywood set located near San Francisco. An expansion of the New England section would have included a commemoration of the Battle of Bunker Hill, a fishing village, and a Plymouth Rock replica.

In addition, the developers planned to build the Freedomland Inn just south of the park, with between 300 and 600 rooms. (Note: According to author Michael Virgintino, accounts vary on whether the inn would have had 300, 350, 400, and 600 rooms.) Architect William B. Tabler was hired to design the inn, which would have contained amenities such as a wading pool, an Olympic-size swimming pool, a restaurant, and a coffee shop. Ultimately, only a foundation slab was developed; upon the park's eventual demise, some props were dumped over the slab and used as landfill.

== Operation ==
=== 1960 season ===
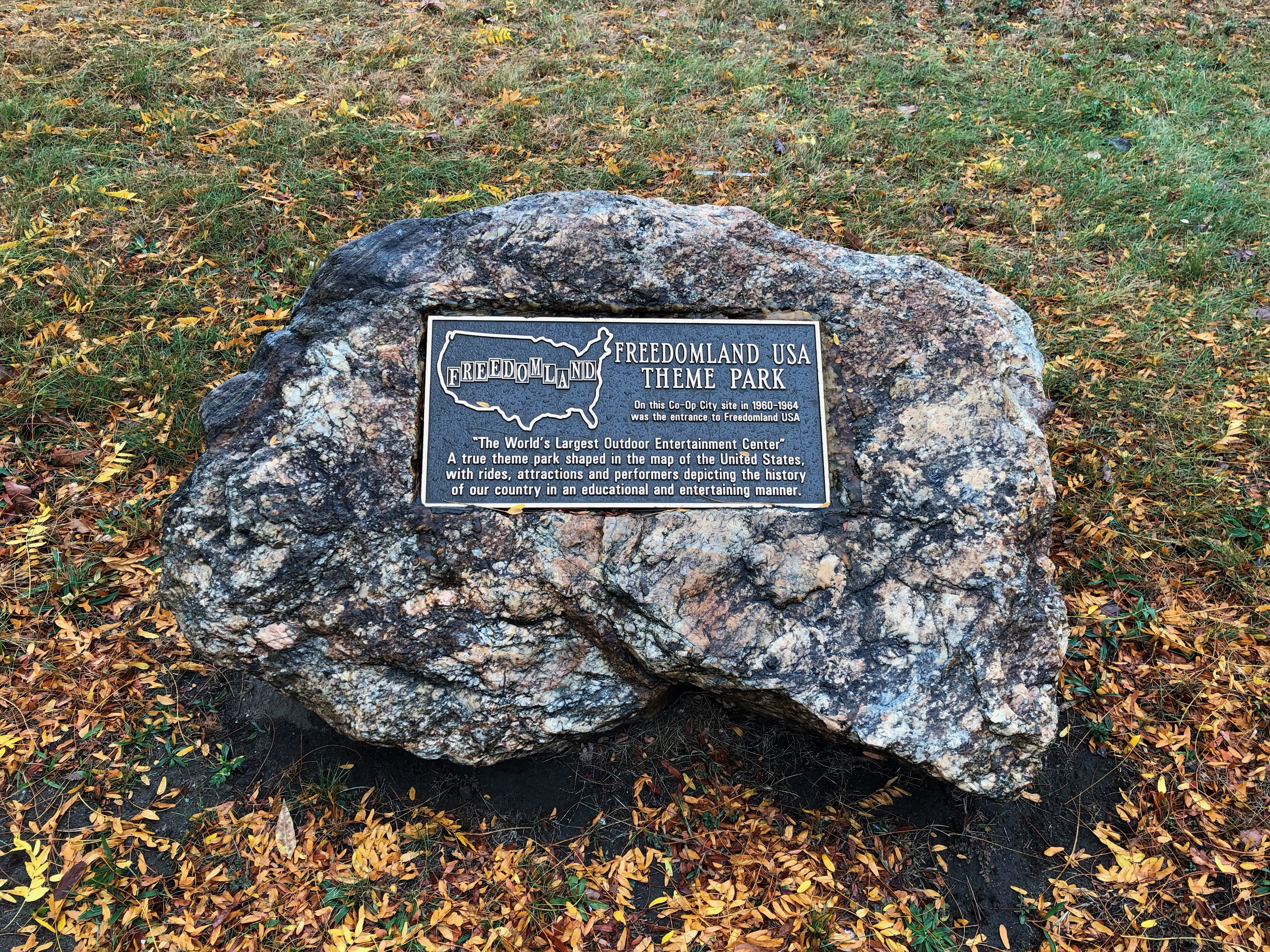
Freedomland USA plaque in present-day Co-op City

Due to Freedomland's high construction costs, it was $7 million in debt on its opening day, leading commenters to describe it as a "gamble". Schumacher hoped that Freedomland would be as large a New York City icon as Central Park or the Statue of Liberty. Although optimistic projections called for up to 5 million visitors a year, Freedomland would have needed to see two million visitors in its first season in order to break even. Toward the end of the season, first-year visitation projections were decreased from 4.8 million to 1.7 million; the park ultimately saw 1.5 million visitors, a statistic that was never surpassed in subsequent seasons. For the 1960 operating season, Freedomland was open seven days a week until September 18, after which its operating hours were cut to weekends only. Freedomland's managers had planned to operate the park from May 15 to October 15 of each year. The last operating day of the 1960 season was at the end of October.

On August 28, 1960, three armed men stole the day's receipts of over $28,000; the thieves, identified as employees, were arrested two weeks later. Freedomland had failed to pay the city a 5% amusement tax totaling $148,200, which was paid that October. The 1960 season was also marked by several incidents involving patron injuries, including a stagecoach overturning that injured 10 people in June and a train ride that injured two boys when it overturned in October. Meanwhile, Turner Construction and Aberthaw Construction placed a $3.648 million mechanic's lien on the park in November 1960. The various lawsuits and liens left the park in debt. During the 1960 season, Webb and Knapp bought a 40% share in the project, only for the stock to drop from $17.50 to $6.25 a share. At one point, local merchants refused to accept checks that Freedomland had issued. By that August, Zeckendorf had hired two men to replace Raynor and Wood, who had resigned from the park. Zeckendorf also hired Art K. Moss, a marketing expert, who cut costs by decreasing the $150,000 weekly payroll by 20% and forbidding employees from collecting overtime. To raise money for the park, Zeckendorf proposed selling his leaseholds on three hotels in Midtown Manhattan (the Astor, Commodore, and Manhattan hotels) to the IRC.

=== 1961 season ===
During the 1960–1961 off-season, Webb and Knapp considered developing a shopping center along Freedomland's peripher and constructing the proposed motel. Freedomland continued to experience financial troubles: before the beginning of the 1961 season, it was $8 million in debt. This led the IRC to propose that Zeckendorf sell the leaseholds on several Manhattan hotels to Freedomland Inc. in exchange for a $16.35 million mortgage note. As part of the plan, Webb and Knapp would give the park a $3 million cash loan, and it would purchase the lien that the construction contractors had placed on the park. This plan was approved in June 1961, just prior to the start of the park's second season. Zeckendorf also unsuccessfully attempted a merger with Yonkers Raceway & Empire City Casino. Yonkers Raceway's owners declined, though the IRC did purchase a controlling interest in the raceway that October.

The park operators initially predicted that the park would reopen in May 1961; the park reopened a month later on June 10, 1961. Admission fees were raised to $2.95 for a park-wide entrance ticket, and pay-per-ride admission was abolished. To entice visitors, Freedomland started to add more traditional amusement rides, such as the Moon Bowl dance floor, and expanded its schedule of performances. The new attractions, which included a live show called Colossus, brought the park to 164 events and attractions for the 1961 season. The Freedomland Inn ad not started construction. During the 1961 season, over 1.7 million visitors entered Freedomland, and visitors stayed for an average of 7 hours and 48 minutes. To satiate employees' demands for pay raises, the security budget was decreased, which resulted in people sneaking into the park without an admission ticket. To combat the park's declining reputation, Moss allowed taxicab drivers of New York City and their families to enter Freedomland for free.

=== 1962 season ===
By 1962, it cost $1 million per year to maintain the park during the off-season. Prior to the 1962 season, Freedomland spent $1 million to add and expand its offerings. The improvements included a 5,000-seat arena and a midway-themed area with children's rides, as well as the Astro-Ride roller coaster and a Wiggly-Worm caterpillar ride. The 1962 season started on May 27 of that year. It was open weekends only for the first month, expanding its schedule to seven days a week in late June. Freedomland charged $3.50 admission during the 1962 season. After implementing a system of portable radios, the park laid off 700 of its 3,000 workers during that season. Visitors who entered after 6 p.m. were charged a reduced price of $2.50. The park also offered concerts, which featured acts such as Louis Armstrong, the Glenn Miller Orchestra, Benny Goodman, and Paul Anka.

Following these changes, paint company Benjamin Moore & Co., which sponsored an exhibit in Satellite City, sued Freedomland in September 1962, seeking $150,000 in damages. The company sought to void its lease for exhibit space, citing "historical and educational" changes to the park's character. The New York Supreme Court ruled against Benjamin Moore. Concessionaires also started complaining of high rents, which had increased to $20 to $25 per square foot ($220 to $270/m^{2}), a price that many vendors could not pay with their low profits. Total admission for 1962 was estimated at 1.4 million.

=== 1963 season ===
The 1963 season started on April 21 of that year, at which point it was open weekends only until that June. Admission had been reduced to one dollar. By that time, the themes of the amusements and events had little to do with history in general, let alone American history. The events advertised at the park included a children's zoo, puppet shows, DJ shows, clown performances, and circus parades. The Meteor single-rail coaster, bumper cars, side shows, a wax display, and a reconstructed carousel from the Dentzel Carousel Company were also added during the 1963 season. As Webb and Knapp's financial troubles increased in the 1960s, the firm placed the site of the proposed Freedomland Inn for sale at an auction in July 1963, with a minimum asking price of $2 million. The site, covering 500,000 square feet (46,000 m^{2}), did not garner any bids. Zeckendorf also sold off adjacent plots of land. The park closed for the season on September 29, 1963.

In total, Freedomland earned a combined $3 million from admissions during the 1962 and 1963 seasons. Freedomland still had a large amount of debt, and Webb and Knapp faced serious financial troubles of its own, prompting the firm to write off its entire investment in Freedomland in 1963. The company also sought to sell its lease of the land. That December, Zeckendorf obtained a $25 million mortgage loan from a pension fund of the Teamsters Union. Zeckendorf secured the loan by giving the Teamsters Union his lease of the park's 149-acre (60 ha) site, among other sites; this resolved the park's short-term debt. Zeckendorf was also considering ways to keep Freedomland open year-round, proposing ideas such as a ski slope, a horse-racing track, a bowling alley, and a series of Christmas events. In advance of the 1964 season, the park's operators added a haunted castle attraction.

=== 1964 season ===
Freedomland's fifth operating season began on May 16, 1964, with the park operating only on weekends until June. By then, the San Francisco-themed area already had been walled off. For several months prior to the start of the 1964 season, there were rumors that Freedomland would be moved to Florida, where it could operate year-round. Staff members were told that only Little Old New York, Old Chicago, and Satellite City might be open for 1965, while the rest of the park would be redeveloped. That July, Freedomland stopped booking rock-and-roll bands and started hiring big bands.

In July 1964, the IRC acquired Webb and Knapp's stake in Freedomland Inc. National Development Corporation president Hyman Green, who owned 20 percent of the NDC, bought the remaining 80 percent stake from Zeckendorf. The transactions were intended to reduce Webb and Knapp's large debt, which it had incurred after writing off $17.9 million in investments in IRC and Freedomland Inc. At the time, Green said he expected Freedomland to make a profit during the 1964 season, even as it had lost money year-to-date. Zeckendorf later said that Webb and Knapp's involvement in Freedomland "hurt the financial position of Webb and Knapp more than anything we've ever done." Toward the end of the 1964 operating season, Freedomland was expected to reopen the next year, even though it had only earned $738,000 from admissions; the park was so financially troubled that it had paid its employees bad checks totaling $60,000.

== Demise ==
=== Bankruptcy ===
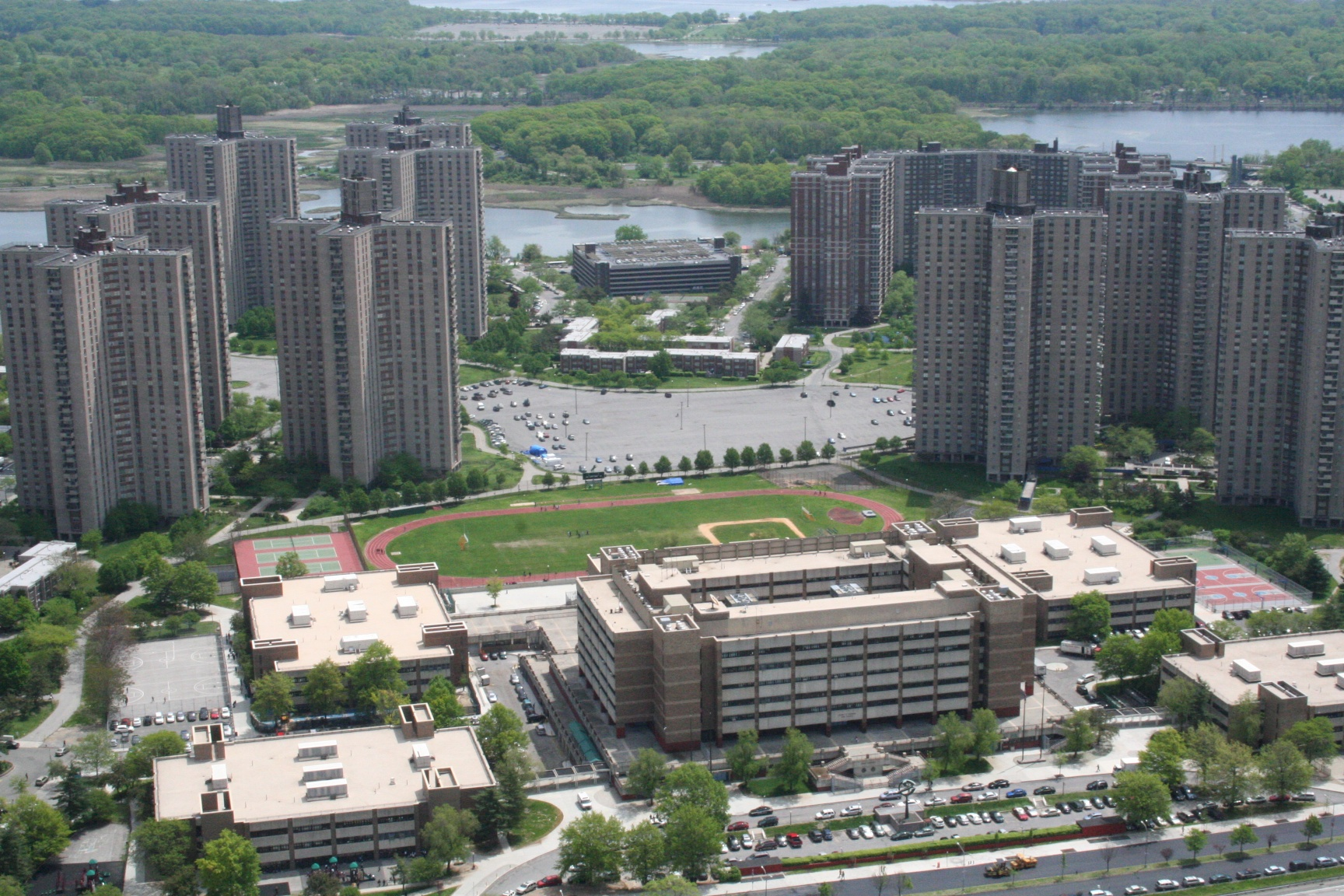
Co-op City was built on the site of Freedomland's parking lot.

On September 13, 1964, Freedomland closed for the season. Within three days, Freedomland Inc. had filed for bankruptcy. At the time, Freedomland Inc.'s liabilities were $27 million, about three times its $9 million in assets. The largest creditors, in order, were the IRC, the NDC, Zeckendorf, and the Internal Revenue Service. The bankruptcy filing nearly caused the collapse of the Teamsters Union, which held the mortgage on the property. Freedomland had never earned a net profit in each of its five operating seasons; if it were downsized 30 acres (12 ha), Freedomland estimated that it could make a $25,000 profit if it were to reopen in 1965. Freedomland never reopened, and its attractions, buildings, and other features were auctioned and sold during 1965.

==== Causes ====
Freedomland Inc.'s bankruptcy filings cited competition from the 1964 New York World's Fair as a direct reason for the park's closure. The author Michael Virgintino wrote that the World's Fair was unlikely to be the main reason for Freedomland's bankruptcy, as the World's Fair had been announced in 1959, and many of the fair's visitors only attended that event a few times. Furthermore, the World's Fair had recorded a financial loss in 1964, and several amusement attractions at the fair had gone bankrupt during that year. This was part of a decline in New York City's amusement industry in general, as the city's traditional amusement area of Coney Island had declined simultaneously.

Several factors contributed to Freedomland's failure. First, it only operated seasonally, thus reducing potential income; this contrasted with Disneyland, which operated year-round. Freedomland was only open for three or four months a year, so its capacity was much lower than Disneyland's, which had 6 million guests in 1964. Second, the marshland was unstable and contributed to damage to many of the structures, requiring additional repair costs. A third factor was Freedomland's weak sense of identity, as people wishing for more traditional attractions could go to other places like Coney Island or Rye Playland. The park's failure may also have been exacerbated by the fact that Webb and Knapp had acquired too many assets, such as hotels, which had also struggled financially in the early 1960s.

Freedomland may not have been intended to last long from the outset. William Zeckendorf said in 1970 that Freedomland was a "placeholder" to obtain land variances to permit more lucrative residential and commercial development of the marshland; the durability of the amusement structures obviated the need to undergo a proper monitoring period of 15 to 20 years.

=== Redevelopment ===
The NDC indicated in 1965 that it would sell about 300 acres (120 ha) of its 400-acre (160 ha) holdings in the northeast Bronx to the United Housing Foundation. In February 1965, the United Housing Foundation announced plans for the Co-op City development, a 15,500-unit housing cooperative, on the site. Even as these plans were announced, Freedomland was still negotiating to operate 30 acres adjacent to Co-op City. The New York City Planning Commission approved these plans in May 1965, with no provisions for an amusement park. By early the next year, most remaining portions of Freedomland were destroyed. Co-op City was constructed on Freedomland's parking lot and the Little Old New York and Satellite City areas during the late 1960s, and the first residents began moving to the area in 1968. The construction of Co-op City contributed to large areas of salt marsh degradation, exacerbating a process that had started when Freedomland was built.

The rest of the park remained decrepit and undeveloped through the 1970s, and some of the park's abandoned buildings remained on site. During the early 1980s, Bay Plaza Shopping Center was constructed on the land occupied by five additional park areas. Another proposal during the late 20th century, which called for light industrial development on the Freedomland site, failed when the developer could not obtain funding. Subsequently, Prestige Properties and Development Company proposed redeveloping part of the site as a commercial and office complex in 1990, following the completion of the adjacent Bay Plaza. A small part of the Freedomland development—a tract at the convergence of the New England Thruway and Hutchinson River Parkway, which had been intended for the Freedomland Inn—remained undeveloped until 2012, when an expansion of Bay Plaza Shopping Center opened at the site.

== Reception ==
The areas were not historically or geographically accurate, and they primarily depicted events from the late 19th century. A writer for The New York Times stated that the themed lands were "perhaps not quite acceptable to the Geodetic Survey because so many dull places have been left out", and Time magazine called the park "nothing less than a replica of the continental U.S.A., 833 yds from parkway to shining parkway". Furthermore, most of the attractions were themed on the American frontier, a factor influenced by Wood's and Raynor's respective upbringings in Texas and Chicago, as well as Zeckendorf's grandfather's adventures in Arizona Territory. This led writer Paul D. Naish to state, "The photographed streetscapes at Freedomland have a distinctly generic quality." Walt Disney said of the park in 1961: "I think it was wrong from the start."

Freedomland generally received negative attention from members of the media. For instance, at the groundbreaking ceremony, writer Gay Talese observed that the park, characterized by its backers as the future "'greatest outdoor entertainment center in the history of man'", was to be built on such a "vast wasteland". Historian Walter Muir Whitehill described Freedomland as an operation with a "veneer of pseudo history" whose main purpose was to make money. Time magazine wrote of the simulated attractions in the park, which included "an electromagnetic dragon [and] real buffalo grazing the prairies", as well as so-called "birch-bark Chippewa war canoes" that were actually fiberglass and crewed by Cherokee people. However, the magazine also stated that the public did not initially seem to mind these false representations. By contrast, a reporter for the Los Angeles Times wrote in 1962 that "the Bronx is cheering" for Freedomland, even though "there is very little to cheer about in the Bronx".

Soon after the park's opening, it gained a negative reputation among the public: toward its final years, mention of Freedomland often provoked reactions of either "ridicule or apathy". After the park closed, a Newsday writer called Freedomland a "flop" and said of many of the opening day visitors: "They came. They saw. They left. And most never came back." According to The New York Times, when Walt Disney World was being developed in central Florida in the late 1960s, some people expressed skepticism about whether it would be commercially successful, citing Freedomland's quick failure.

In 1993, The Walt Disney Company proposed developing Disney's America, an American history theme park near Manassas, Virginia. The proposal was similar to the Freedomland concept, but it was abandoned the following year after massive opposition. Russell Miller, one of the critics of Disney's America, found that plan deficient compared to Freedomland. Miller praised Freedomland as "an open-air theatre [that] promised not historical truth but national myth, infused with a spirit", while he questioned whether Disney's America was "a theme park or a bad night on PBS".

== Legacy ==
=== Site ===
In nearby neighborhoods such as Williamsbridge, motels built primarily for Freedomland remained operational, despite the dearth of visitor attractions in the northeast Bronx. In August 2013, a plaque commemorating the park was installed near the site of its flagpoles. During mid-2019, remnants of Totsie, one of the New York Harbor tugboats, were placed near the plaque. The remains of Totsie were donated by Rob Friedman, an unofficial archivist of Freedomland history.

A small portion of the former park site, at the northeast corner of Bartow and Baychester Avenues, remains zoned as a C7 district. Such districts are reserved "for large open amusement parks"; Coney Island is the only other such district in the city. The zoning district is a holdover from Freedomland's operation. Due to its C7 zoning, the lot lacked any restrictions for the surface areas of signs located within its limits. This prompted a subsequent landowner to erect a tall billboard on the lot in 2019, although the billboard was controversial. As a result, Co-op City residents proposed changing the lot's zoning to a standard commercial use.

=== Attractions moved to other parks ===
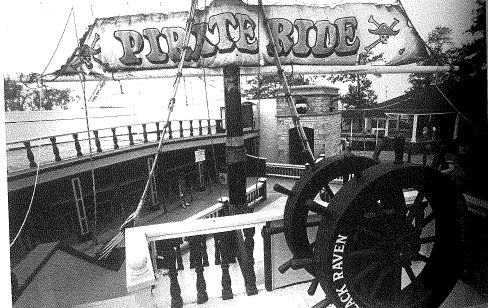
Cedar Point Pirate Ride (formerly of Freedomland)

Some Freedomland attractions and design features were auctioned or sold to other parks, and many of these attractions no longer exist. The Crystal Maze, Danny the Dragon, an interior diorama of the Mine Caverns, the Tornado dark ride, and the King Rex Carrousel were moved to The Great Escape & Splashwater Kingdom, when it was owned by Charles R. Wood and known as Storytown USA, in Lake George, New York. The Tornado briefly operated at Kennywood in West Mifflin, Pennsylvania, from 1962 before moving to Lake George in 1967. The Crystal Maze building was converted into a concession stand and then an administration building.

Two of the three Santa Fe Railroad stations were moved to Clark's Trading Post (subsequently called Clark's Bears), a family-owned park in Lincoln, New Hampshire. The park obtained Freedomland's Chicago station and the one-room prop station based in the Old Southwest-themed area of Freedomland; it was used for the still-operating White Mountain Central Railroad. Other Freedomland items that appear at Clark's include bricks from Little Old New York, seats from the Braniff Space Rover and street lamps from all over the park.

One of the two sternwheelers was moved to the Byram River between Greenwich, Connecticut, and Port Chester, New York, where it supposedly still serves as a restaurant. (Note: Virgintino (2018) writes that there is confusion between the fate of the two sternwheelers. He states that The Canadian was moved to Johnsonville Village, Connecticut, and was likely destroyed in 2005. According to Virgintino, the restaurant boat was The American, which was destroyed in late 2018 while being transferred to a ship. Gottlock & Gottlock (2013), as well as the Bronx Times (2019), say that The Canadian was the restaurant boat. According to the Bronx Times, The Canadian still serves as a restaurant.) San Francisco's Earthquake and New Orleans' Buccaneers (renamed Pirate Ride) attractions were moved to Cedar Point in Sandusky, Ohio, in 1966; both attractions have been removed. The tugboat Totsie operated for many years at Quassy Amusement Park in Middlebury, Connecticut. Other Freedomland objects and attractions were moved to places such as Niagara Falls on the New York-Ontario border and the Magic Mountain site in Colorado. Forest Park Highlands, an amusement park in St. Louis that closed in 1963, apparently sold its Aero Jet ride to Freedomland, which in turn sold it to Knoebels Amusement Resort in Elysburg, Pennsylvania.

=== Historical commemoration ===
Freedomland's history has been the subject of several books. Arcadia Publishing published two books in the Images of America series; the second book, Freedomland: 1960–1964 by Robert McLaughlin, was published in 2015. A detailed book about the park's history, Freedomland U.S.A.: The Definitive History by Michael Virgintino, was published in 2019. C. V. Wood's life and contributions to Disneyland are recalled in the book Three Years In Wonderland (2016) by Todd James Pierce.

In 1999, a website dedicated to the history of Freedomland was set up by Friedman. The New York Times reported at the time that "the site quickly became a lightning rod for Freedomland enthusiasts, receiving 6 to 10 E-mail messages a week with reminiscences and offers of material for its creator's growing collection."

== See also ==
- List of defunct amusement parks in the United States
- List of tourist attractions in New York City
