= Heisler locomotive =

Geared steam locomotive

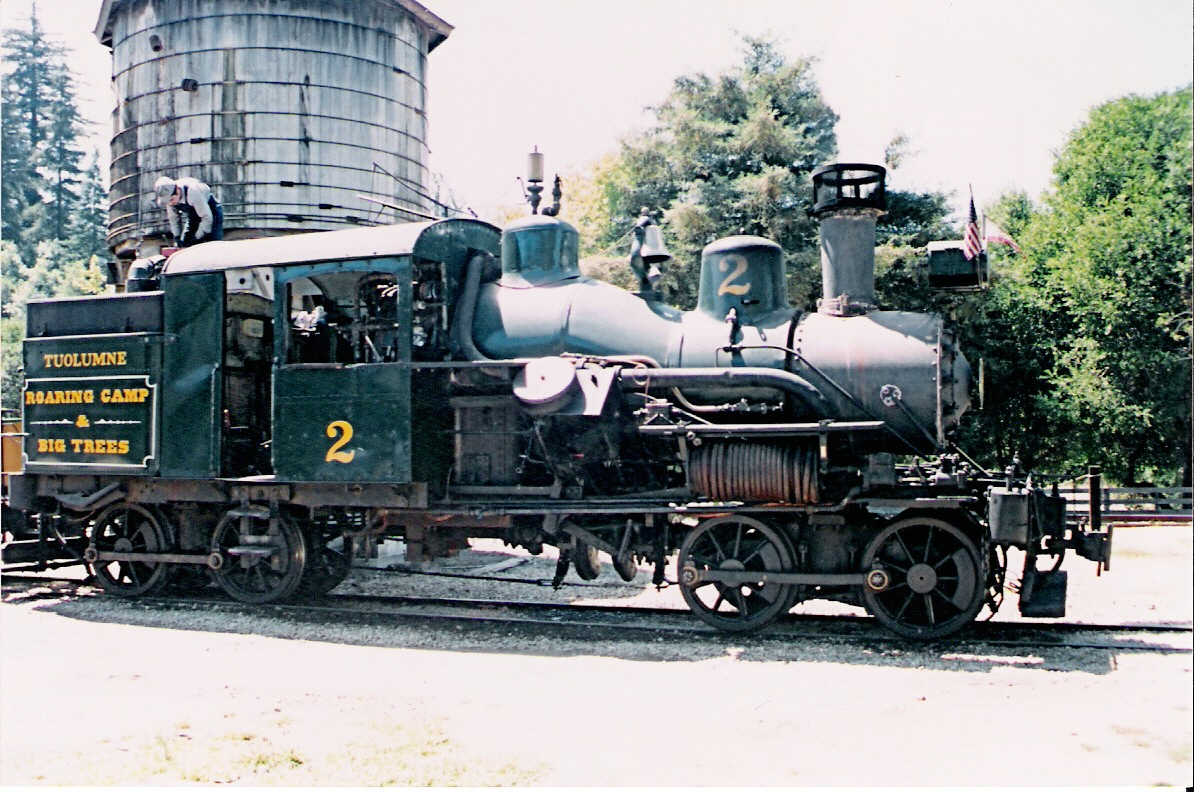
Tuolumne on the Roaring Camp and Big Trees Railroad

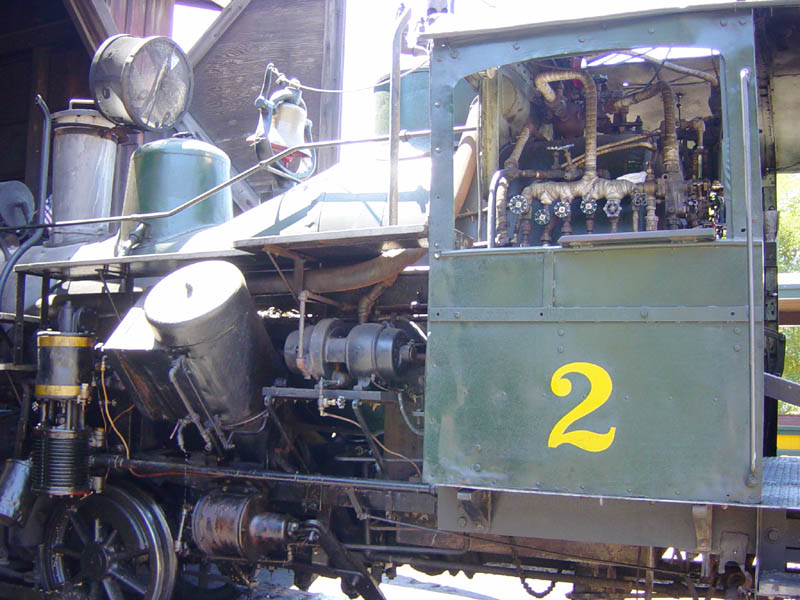
Heisler technical view

The Heisler locomotive is one of the three major types of geared steam locomotives and the last to be patented.

Charles L. Heisler received a patent for the design in 1892, following the construction of a prototype in 1891. Somewhat similar to a Climax locomotive, Heisler's design featured two cylinders canted inwards at a 45-degree angle to form a 'V-twin' arrangement. Power then went to a longitudinal drive shaft in the center of the frame that drove the outboard axle on each powered truck through bevel gears in an enclosed gearcase riding on the axle between the truck frames. The inboard axle on each truck was then driven from the outboard one by external side (connecting) rods.

In 1897, Heisler received a patent on a three-truck locomotive. As with Class C Shay locomotives, the tender rode on the third truck. Unlike the Shay and Climax, Heisler's 3-truck design did not use an inline string of line shafting running the length of the engine. Instead, the tender truck was driven by a line shaft above the shaft driving the main engine trucks, connected to it through spur gears. This patent also covered use of a 4-cylinder 'V4' cylinder configuration.

The Heisler is a faster example of a geared steam locomotive design, and yet was still claimed by its manufacturer to have the same low-speed hauling ability.

== Builders ==
The first Heislers were built by the Dunkirk Engineering Company of Dunkirk, New York, at the time producer of their own design of geared locomotive (called the Dunkirk), of which the Heisler could be considered an improvement. They did not adopt the Heisler design, but in 1894 the Stearns Manufacturing Company of Erie, Pennsylvania started to produce Heislers, and did so until 1904. Reorganised as the Heisler Locomotive Works in 1907, it produced locomotives of the Heisler design until 1941.

A&G Price of Thames, New Zealand received an order for a Heisler locomotive in 1943 from Ogilvie and Co, sawmillers of Hokitika, who wanted to purchase a Heisler locomotive but were unable to do so as production of Heisler locomotives had ceased in 1941. The resulting locomotive, maker's N^{O} 148 of 1944, was the last Heisler-design steam locomotive to be built, and closely followed Heisler practice but with the addition of a Belpaire firebox and front-mounted water tanks that featured a unique curved leading edge.

== Variants ==
Heislers were produced mostly in two- and three-truck variants in sizes ranging from 17 to 95 short tons (15.2 to 84.8 long tons; 15.4 to 86.2 t). There was one single-truck, narrow-gauge Heisler-built, Lake Shore Stone Products Co. #7 for the Lake Shore Stone Products Co.Lake Shore Stone Co., Milwaukee, Wisconsin?

== Notable survivors ==
Roughly 625 Heislers were produced, of which some 35 still exist. Approximately eight of these survivors are currently operational.

| Works No. | Year | No. of trucks | Weight | Preserved as | Location | Notes |
|---|---|---|---|---|---|---|
| 1375 | 1918 | 2 | 53 short tons (47.3 long tons; 48.1 metric tons) | Chicago Mill and Lumber Company 4 | Railroad Museum of Pennsylvania | Displayed with a Climax and a Shay. |
| 1594 | 1929 | 2 | 32 short tons (28.6 long tons; 29.0 metric tons) | White Mountain Central Railroad 4 | Clark's Trading Post in Lincoln, New Hampshire. | |
| 1401 | 1899 | 2 | 37 short tons (33.0 long tons; 33.6 metric tons) | Roaring Camp & Big Trees Narrow Gauge RR 2 | Roaring Camp and Big Trees Narrow Gauge Railroad in Felton, California. | Oldest known operational Heisler. |
| 1306 | 1915 | 2 | 40 short tons (35.7 long tons; 36.3 metric tons) | W. H. Eccles Lumber Company 3 | Sumpter Valley Railway in Baker County, Oregon. | In Service. |
| 1369 | 1918 | 3 | 75 short tons (67.0 long tons; 68.0 metric tons) | Pickering Lumber Company 2 | Travel Town open-air museum in Los Angeles. | |
| 1479 | 1923 | 2 | 55 short tons (49.1 long tons; 49.9 metric tons) | 9 | Southeastern Railway Museum in Duluth, Georgia. | Static display. |
| 1351 | 1916 | 2 | 47 short tons (42.0 long tons; 42.6 metric tons) | Bluestone Mining & Smelting 1. | Roots of Motive Power in Willits, California. | |
| 1198 | 1910 | 2 | 60 short tons (53.6 long tons; 54.4 metric tons) | Curtiss Lumber Company 2 | Oregon Coast Scenic Railroad in Garibaldi, Oregon. | Awaiting boiler work. |
| | 1917 | 2 | | CRAIG MT. LBR. CO. #3 (Craig Mountain Lumber Company (Idaho)) | Oregon Coast Scenic Railroad in Garibaldi, Oregon. | Operational. |
| 1930 | 1929 | 3 | 90 short tons (80.4 long tons; 81.6 metric tons) | West Fork Logging Co #91 | Mount Rainier Scenic Railroad in Elbe, Washington. | Awaiting boiler work. |
| | | 3 | 78 short tons (69.6 long tons; 70.8 metric tons) | | Mount Rainier Scenic Railroad in Elbe, Washington. | Static display. |
| 1591 | 1929 | 3 | 90 short tons (80.4 long tons; 81.6 metric tons) | Cass Scenic Railroad 6 | Cass Scenic Railroad State Park in Cass, West Virginia. | Operational. |
| 1446 | 1920 | 2 | 36 short tons (32.1 long tons; 32.7 metric tons) | Pacific Lumber Co. 9 | Scotia, California. | Static display. |
| 1260 | 1912 | 2 | 36 short tons (32.1 long tons; 32.7 metric tons) | 2 | Silver Creek and Stephenson historical railroad in Freeport, Illinois. | Operational |
| 1082 | 1904 | 2 | 20 short tons (17.9 long tons; 18.1 metric tons) | | Bush Tramway Club at Pukemiro, New Zealand. | Currently under restoration. |
| 1450 | 1921 | 2 | 26 short tons (23.2 long tons; 23.6 metric tons) | | Ferrymead Railway, Christchurch, New Zealand. | Stored in the locomotive shed. |
| 1494 | 1924 | 2 | 24 short tons (21.4 long tons; 21.8 metric tons) | | Shantytown, near Greymouth, New Zealand. | Statically restored in 2011 for display within the park's environs. |
| 1502 | 1924 | 3 | 90 short tons (80.4 long tons; 81.6 metric tons) | Potlatch 92 | Locomotive Park in Lewiston, Idaho. | Unrestored state on static display. |
| 1565 | 1928 | 3 | 80 short tons (71.4 long tons; 72.6 metric tons) | 4 | El Salto, Mexico, along the Durango-Mazatlan highway. | |
| | 1923 | 2 | | Ohio Match Company #4 | Northwest Railway Museum in Snoqualmie, WA | Static display. Last operated in 1958. |
| A&G Price 148 | 1943 | 2 | | Ogilvie and Company "Gladstone" | Steam Scene, Christchurch, New Zealand, | Last Heisler design locomotive built; in full working order; boiler ticket will expire in 2022. |

== Advantages and disadvantages ==
The Heisler locomotive's gearing was inside the frame and thus protected, unlike that of a Shay locomotive. However, the Heisler's drive shaft, which was located in the center of the frame, limited firebox space. For this reason, when A&G Price built their Heisler, in 1943, they used a Belpaire firebox, to mitigate problems with burning wood and accommodating the drive shaft.

== Conversions ==
Similar to the Climax, some Heislers, especially two-truck ones, were converted to diesel or gasoline power, retaining their gearing and drive shafts, but their steam boiler is replaced by an internal combustion engine.
