= John Grinold =

American athletic director

Jack Grinold
- Born: John P. Grinold; 1936; United States
- Died: April 21, 2017; Boston, Massachusetts, U.S.
- Education: Bowdoin College (Class of 1957)
- Occupations: Athletic director, sports historian
- Employer: Northeastern University
- Known for: Sports information director, athletics historian
- Awards: COSIDA Hall of Fame (1994), New England Basketball Hall of Fame (2003), Florida Contribution to Amateur Football Award (1994)

John "Jack" Grinold (1936 – April 21, 2017) was an American athletic director. He served Northeastern University as its sports information director for 50 years. In 1984, he was made assistant athletic director with the additional duties of heading the sports marketing and ticket departments, and in 1988, he was promoted to associate director of athletics. He was also in charge of all radio and television packaging. In 1998, in celebration of NU's first 100 years, he was chosen as one of the 100 individuals responsible for the institution's growth and success.

Grinold was also on the executive committee of the Northeastern University Varsity Club and in 1985 became the first non-coach/athlete to be elected to the Northeastern University Athletics Hall of Fame. In his 50 years at Northeastern, he worked 464 consecutive football games, including one undefeated season, and participated in seven NCAA basketball tournaments, the College World Series, NCAA hockey Frozen Four, and many sojourns to the Henley Royal Regatta in England.

Grinold was the first recipient of the New England Sports Information Directors Award for Excellence in 1971, and in 1979 received the ECAC Service Bureau Award for contributions to the conference. He served on numerous COSIDA committees, chaired the Committee on Committees and the Ethics Committee, and was permanent vice-chair of the Awards Committee. He won over 30 COSIDA awards for publication excellence. In 1994, he was inducted into the COSIDA Hall of Fame, and in 1999 received their Community Service Award. In 2003, he was elected to the New England Basketball Hall of Fame.

Grinold chaired the New England Collegiate Writers Association for 38 years. He was also president of the Eastern Massachusetts chapter of the National Football Foundation and Hall of Fame, later serving as its executive director. He received their Contribution to Amateur Football Award in 1994 and a Chapter Leadership Award in 1996. In 2008, the chapter was renamed the Jack Grinold Chapter. He was honored by Boston University as the first non-media recipient of the Scarlet Quill Award. He served as press steward for the Eastern Sprints and IRA Regattas for 33 years and was press steward for rowing and canoeing at the 1984 Olympics in Los Angeles. He also served as secretary of Boston's celebrated Beanpot hockey tournament.

Grinold graduated from Bowdoin College in 1957 and from Browne and Nichols Country Day School in 1953. He also served in the United States Merchant Marine.

He was a life member of the Boston Athenaeum, and elected to the Colonial Society of Massachusetts and the Massachusetts Historical Society, where he served on the Art Committee. He served on the Community Advisory Board to the trustees of WGBH-TV, was vice president of the Victorian Society of New England, chaired its Preservation Awards Committee, and was a former director of the Gibson House Museum.

Grinold was a recognized sports historian and appeared on numerous radio and television shows, including Costas Coast to Coast, SportsChannel, ESPN, NESN, and WABU, discussing the early days of Boston sports.

Outside the sports world, he wrote a history of the Hampshire House (former Bayard Thayer mansion) and contributed to Preview, the bi-monthly publication of the Museum of Fine Arts, and the New England Quarterly. He contributed a chapter to Tradition and Innovation: Reflections on Northeastern University's First Century, and segments to A Century of Sport in Boston.
