= Philip F. Gura =

American academic

- Born: June 14, 1950 (age 76); Ware, Massachusetts, United States
- Occupations: Scholar, writer, editor, educator
- Spouse: Leslie Gura (1979-2015, divorced)
- Children: David, Katherine and Daniel
- Writing career
- Genres: History and literature
- Subjects: Colonial America, Transcendentalism, and religious history
- Website: englishcomplit.unc.edu/faculty-directory/philip-f-gura/

Philip F. Gura (born June 14, 1950) is an intellectual and cultural historian. He currently serves as William S. Newman Distinguished Professor of American Literature and Culture at the University of North Carolina at Chapel Hill, where he holds appointments in the Departments of English and Comparative Literature, Religious Studies, and American Studies.

== Biography ==
Gura was born in Ware, Massachusetts, the son of second-generation factory workers. A cum laude graduate of Phillips Academy (1968), he received his AB, magna cum laude, in History and Literature in 1972 from Harvard College, and his PhD, in the History of American Civilization in 1977, from Harvard University, where he lived in Lowell House.

He is the author or editor of 17 books, including the ASCAP/Deems-Taylor Prize-winning America's Instrument: The Banjo in the Nineteenth Century (with James F. Bollman, 1999) and American Transcendentalism: A History (2007), a National Book Critics Circle Award finalist in non-fiction. One of his essays, "Manufacturing Guitars for the American Parlor" (1996), won the Frances Densmore Prize of the American Instrument Society; another, "Thoreau's Maine Woods Indians: More Representative Men," was awarded the Norman Foerster Prize in American Literature by the Modern Language Association (1977). These and other of his essays, which number over fifty, have been collected in The Crossroads of American History and Literature (1996).

Gura has served as an editor of The Norton Anthology of American Literature, and for ten years edited the MLA-sponsored journal, Early American Literature. He is an elected member of the American Antiquarian Society, the Massachusetts Historical Society, the Colonial Society of Massachusetts, and the Society of American Historians. In 2008, the Division on American Literature to 1800 of the Modern Language Association honored him with its Distinguished Scholar award.

In 2006–2007, he was Andrew W. Mellon Distinguished Scholar in Residence at the American Antiquarian Society. In 2020, Governor Roy Cooper of North Carolina named him to the Order of the Long Leaf Pine, a state-wide citizen's honor.

Gura is a student of old-time Appalachian music, and plays both the banjo, in the clawhammer style, and the fiddle. In his teenage years and early twenties, he was an avid birder, and his voluminous journals and correspondence (1964–1987), pertaining both to ornithology and to his studies in American literature and culture, reside in the Harvard University Archives.

== Selected work ==
- Reading with the Transcendentalists: Ten Works that Made a Movement (2026)
- Liberty Or Justice for All: A Conversation across the American Centuries (2023)
- Man’s Better Angels: Romantic Reformers and the Coming of the Civil War (2017)
- The Life of William Apess (Pequot) (2015)
- Jonathan Edwards: Writings from the Great Awakening (2013).
- Truth's Ragged Edge: The Rise of the American Novel (2013).
- The American Antiquarian Society, 1812–2012: A Bicentennial History (2012).
- American Transcendentalism: A History (2007).
- Jonathan Edwards: America's Evangelical (2005).
- C.F. Martin and His Guitars, 1796–1873 (2003).
- Buried from the World: Inside the Massachusetts State Prison, 1829–1831, The Memorandum Books of the Rev. Jared Curtis (2001).
- America's Instrument: The Banjo in the Nineteenth Century (1999).
- The Crossroads of American History and Literature (1996).
- Memoirs of Stephen Burroughs (1988).
- A Glimpse of Sion's Glory: Puritan Radicalism in New England, 1620–1660 (1984).
- Critical Essays on American Transcendentalism (1982).
- The Wisdom of Words: Language, Theology, and Literature in the New England Renaissance (1981).
