= William S. Newman =

American musicologist

William Stein Newman (April 6, 1912 – April 27, 2000) was an American musicologist.

He was born in Cleveland, Ohio. From 1945 he taught at the University of North Carolina at Chapel Hill. He is best remembered for his three volume History of the Sonata Idea, a study of the term "sonata" comprising The Sonata in the Baroque Era, The Sonata in the Classical Era and The Sonata Since Beethoven. He also wrote on performance practice.

Newman was initiated as an honorary member of Phi Mu Alpha Sinfonia by the Alpha Rho chapter in May 1963.

Newman died in Chapel Hill, North Carolina.

Philip F. Gura, a professor at the University of North Carolina at Chapel Hill, is the William S. Newman Distinguished Professor of American Literature and Culture. A concert series at UNC-Chapel Hill is named in his honor.

His intense interests extended from pugilism (specifically, boxing), to hands-on involvement with sports cars, and, of course, the Chopin Études and the Beethoven Sonatas.

== Publications ==
=== Books ===
- The Sonata in the Baroque Era (Chapel Hill, 1959)
- The Sonata since Beethoven. The Third and Final Volume of A History of the Sonata Idea (Chapel Hill 1969)
- The Pianist’s Problems (New York 1950, 1956 und London 1952),
- Understanding Music (New York 1953).
- A History of the Sonata Idea (3 Bände)

=== Music ===
- Sons of Bach, 3 Sonatas for the Keyboard (New York 1947)
- Diabelli Variations – 16 Contemporaries of Beethoven on a Waltz Tune (Evanston 1958)
- 13 Keyboard Sonatas of the 18th and 19th Centuries (Chapel Hill 1947)
