= House at 29 Mt. Vernon Street =

Historic house in Massachusetts, United States

- U.S. National Register of Historic Places
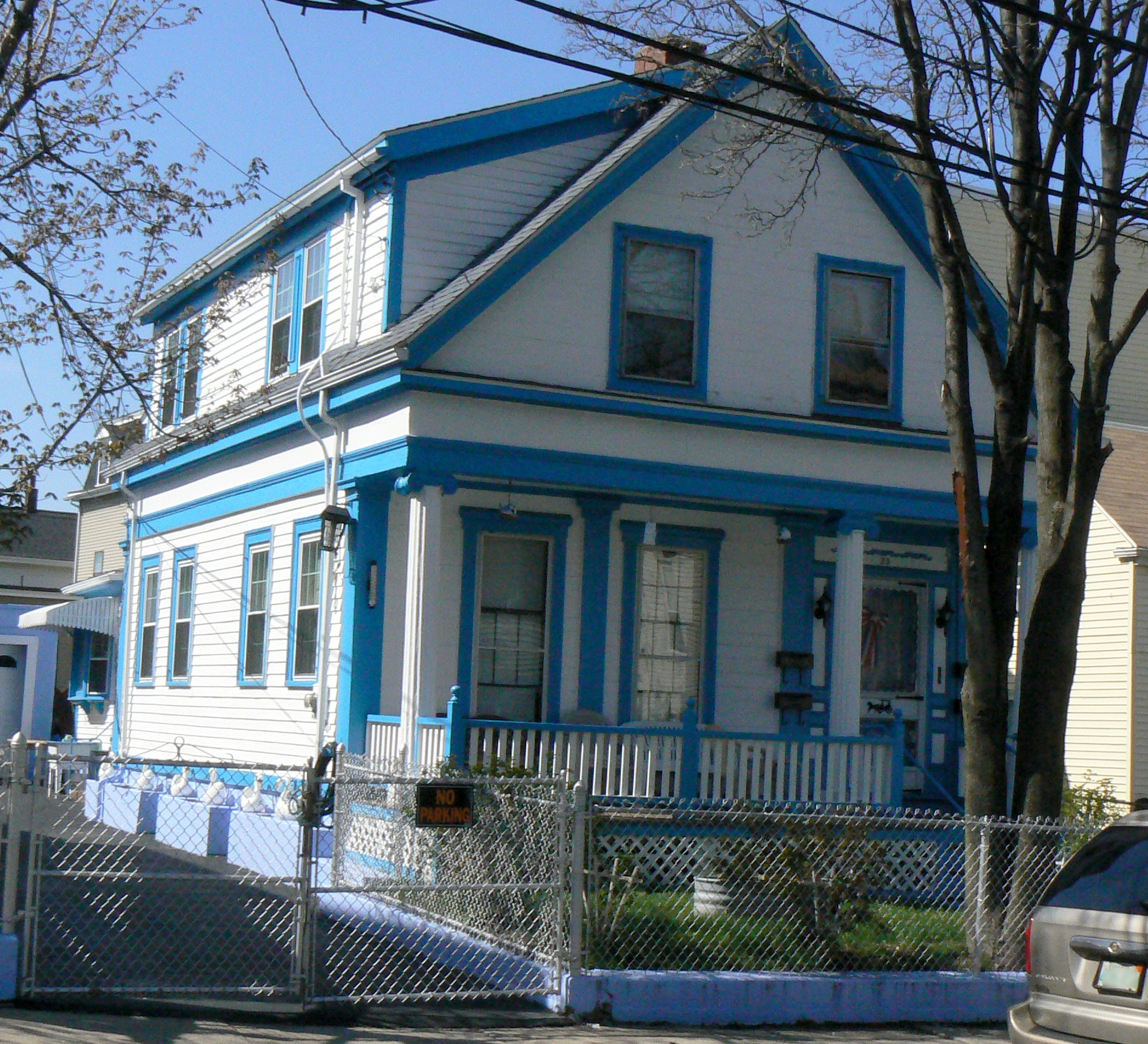

- Location within Massachusetts Location within the United States
- Location: 29 Mt. Vernon St., Somerville, Massachusetts
- Coordinates: 42°23′8″N 71°4′48″W
- Built: 1845
- Architectural style: Greek Revival
- MPS: Somerville MPS
- NRHP reference No.: 89001302
- Added to NRHP: September 18, 1989

The House at 29 Mt. Vernon Street in Somerville, Massachusetts is a well-preserved Greek Revival cottage. The 1 1/2-story wood-frame house was built in the late 1840s, when Mt. Vernon Street was a site of significant development activity. The house is distinctive on the street, as most of the other houses are larger. This house features wide eaves, and a full pedimented gable end above a porch with Ionic columns. It has an elaborate front door surrounded, with framed paneling and pilasters.

The house was listed on the National Register of Historic Places in 1989.

== See also ==
- Mount Vernon Street Historic District, a cluster of c. 1850 Greek Revival cottages
- National Register of Historic Places listings in Somerville, Massachusetts
