= White Mountain Central Railroad =

Heritage railway at Clark's Bears in Lincoln, New Hampshire, United States

Coordinates: 44°03′00″N 71°41′13″W

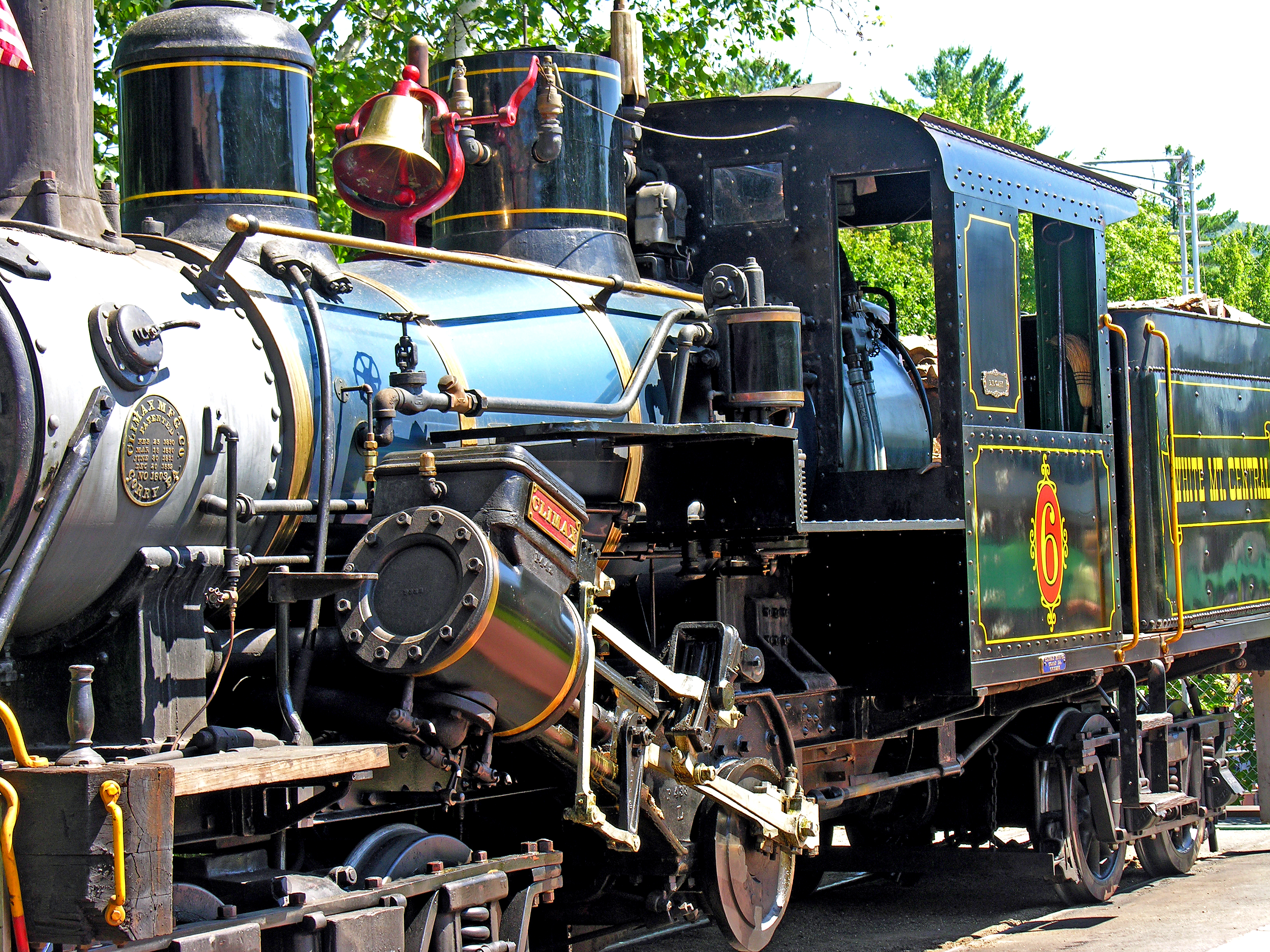
- Climax Locomotive of 1920

Overview
- Headquarters: Lincoln, New Hampshire
- Reporting mark: WMCRR
- Locale: Clark's Bears
- Dates of operation: 1958–present

Technical
- Track gauge: 4 ft 8 1/2 in (1,435 mm) standard gauge
- Length: 1.25 miles (2.01 km)

Other
- Website: whitemountaincentralrr.com

The White Mountain Central Railroad is a short heritage railway at Clark's Bears in Lincoln, New Hampshire. It is notable as being one of the few places in New England with regular steam locomotive operation, as well as being a very rare example of a purpose-built tourist railroad (like those found in amusement parks and theme parks) that uses standard-gauge track instead of narrow-gauge track.

== Route ==
The entrance building to Clark's Bears (previously known as Clark's Trading Post) doubles as the train station. From there, the train leaves north through the park, and then past the small locomotive shop. The railroad crosses the Pemigewasset River on a covered bridge and then heads into a wooded area. In this section of the railroad, an actor playing a wild prospector named "the Wolfman" chases the train in a primitive car. Finally, the railroad goes under a ramp for Interstate 93 and terminates.

== Schedule and fare ==
The railroad operates whenever Clark's Bears is open, between late May and early October. There are several round trips per day, depending on the park's operating hours. Each trip is 30 minutes long, and the fare is included in the Clark's Bears admission price.

== History ==
Construction on the railroad began in 1955. The first train ride was on July 30, 1958.

The railroad includes a 1904 Howe truss covered bridge that was originally located in East Montpelier, Vermont, where it spanned the Winooski River and carried trains for the Montpelier and Barre Railroad. The bridge was purchased by the owners of Clark's Trading Post and dismantled in 1964, then moved and reassembled to span the Pemigewasset River near the Trading Post. During one weekend in September, Railroad Days are celebrated, with extra trains and special consists. That yearly event had stopped in 2014 and now operates every 5–10 years.

A listing of covered bridges maintained by the state of New Hampshire notes that Clark's bridge "appears to be the only Howe railroad bridge left in the world."

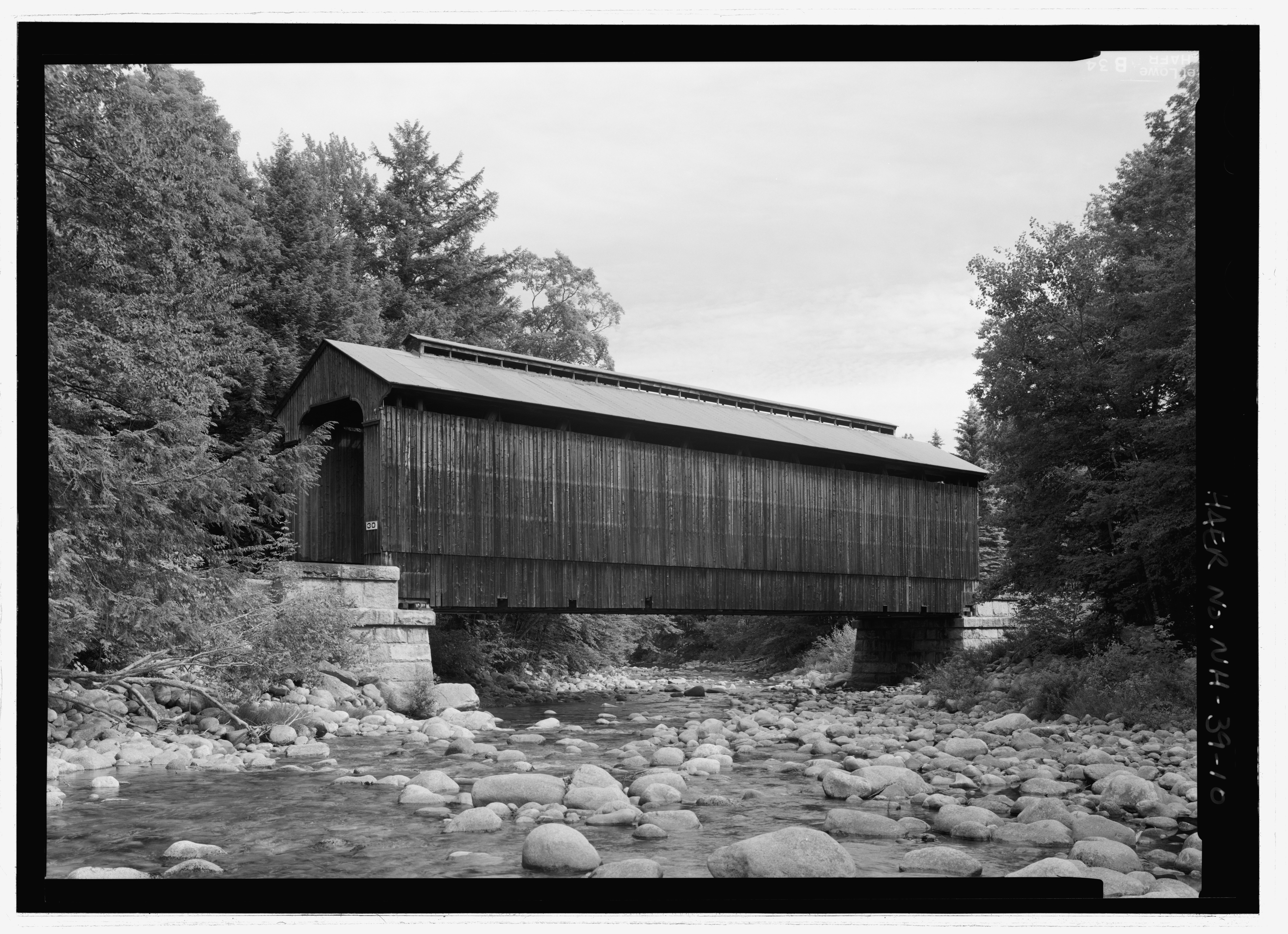
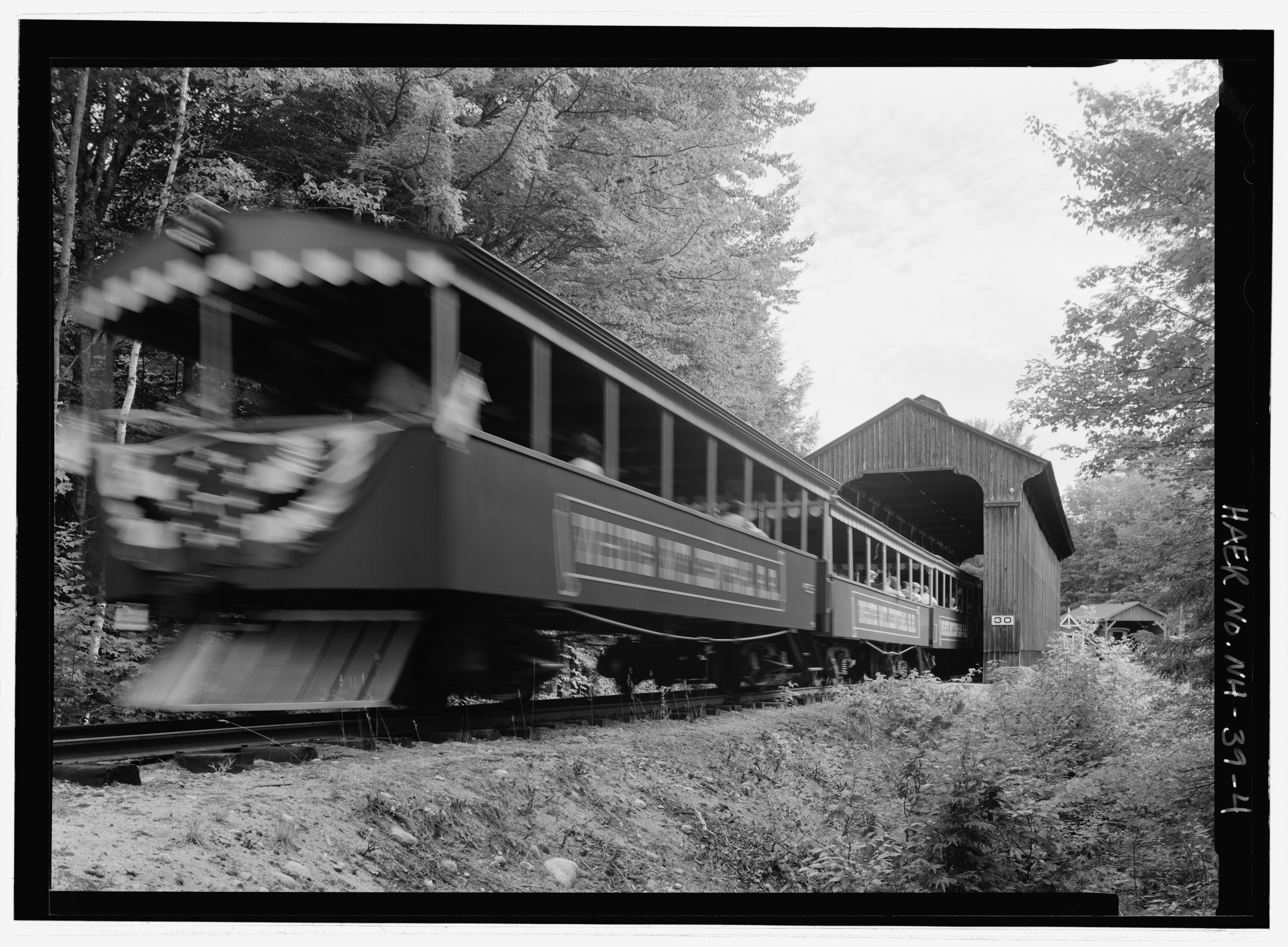
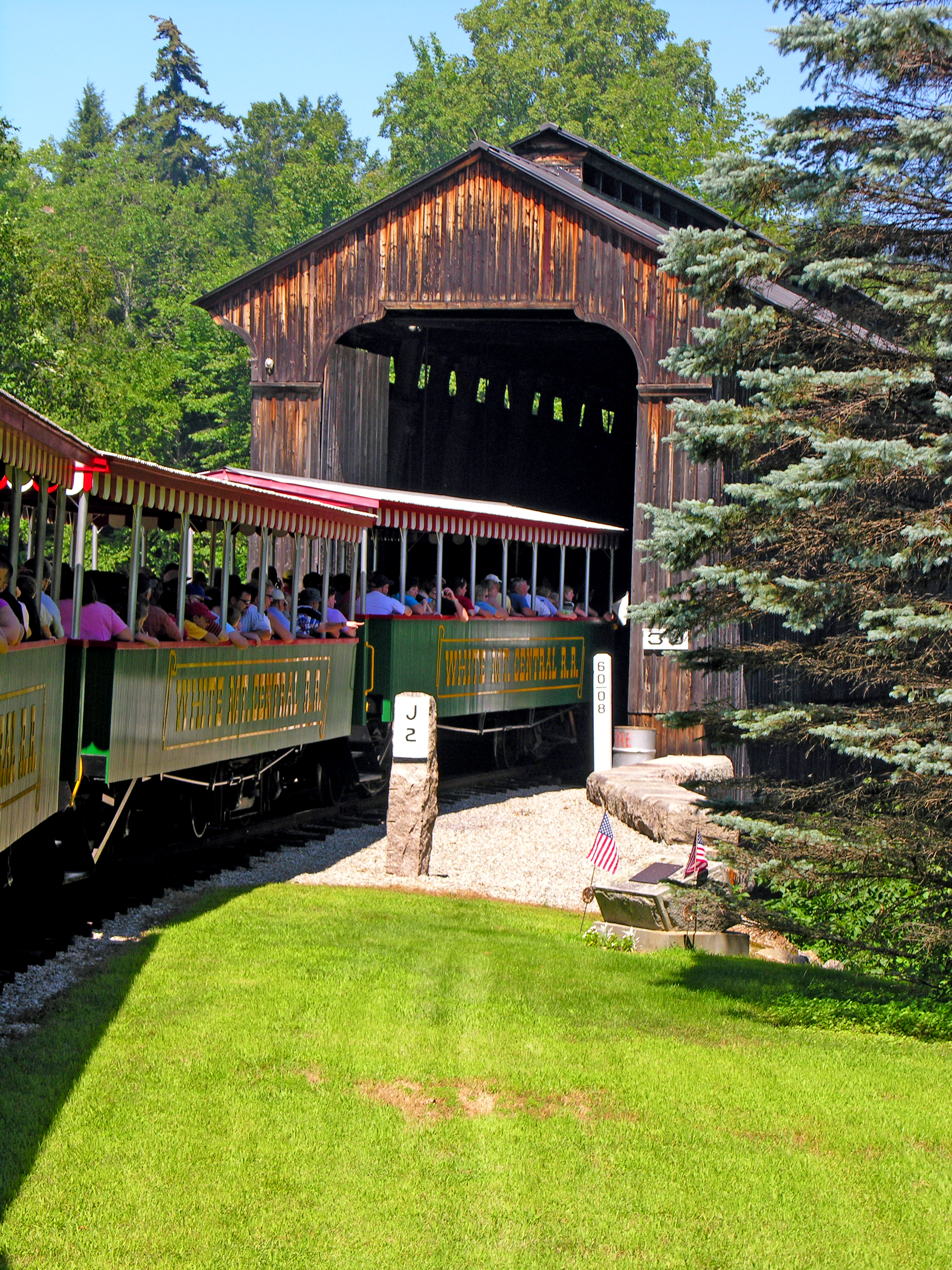
Views of the bridge, including tourist trains, above the Pemigewasset River

== Equipment ==
Locomotive details
Number	Images	Type	Model	Built	Builder	Heritage	Status
1		Steam	0-4-0ST	1931	H.K. Porter, Inc.	Koppers # 1	Operational
2		Gasoline locomotive	Model T	Unknown	Vulcan Iron Works	Granite quarry, Barre, Vermont	Operational
4		Steam	Heisler locomotive	1929	Heisler Locomotive Works	International Shoe Company	Stored, unserviceable
5		Steam	2-4-2ST	Nov. 1906	Baldwin Locomotive Works	East Branch and Lincoln Railroad, 1966–1969. Loon Mountain Ski Resort (display).	Operational
5		Shay locomotive	class B 50-2	Dec. 1919	Lima Locomotive Works	Woodstock Lumber Company, Franconia Paper Company	Display
6		Steam	Climax locomotive	1920	Climax Locomotive Works	Beebe River Lumber Company, East Branch and Lincoln Railroad	Operational
1943		Diesel	65-ton switcher	Aug. 1943	GE Transportation	Newport Dinner Train	Operational
B1		Railbus	Railcar	1930	Sandy River and Rangeley Lakes Railroad	Sandy River and Rangeley Lakes RR, 1930–1937. Starbird Lumber Company.	Operational
Unknown		Miniature steam locomotive	4-4-0	Unknown	Unknown	Unknown	Display

== Station ==
Clark's Bears
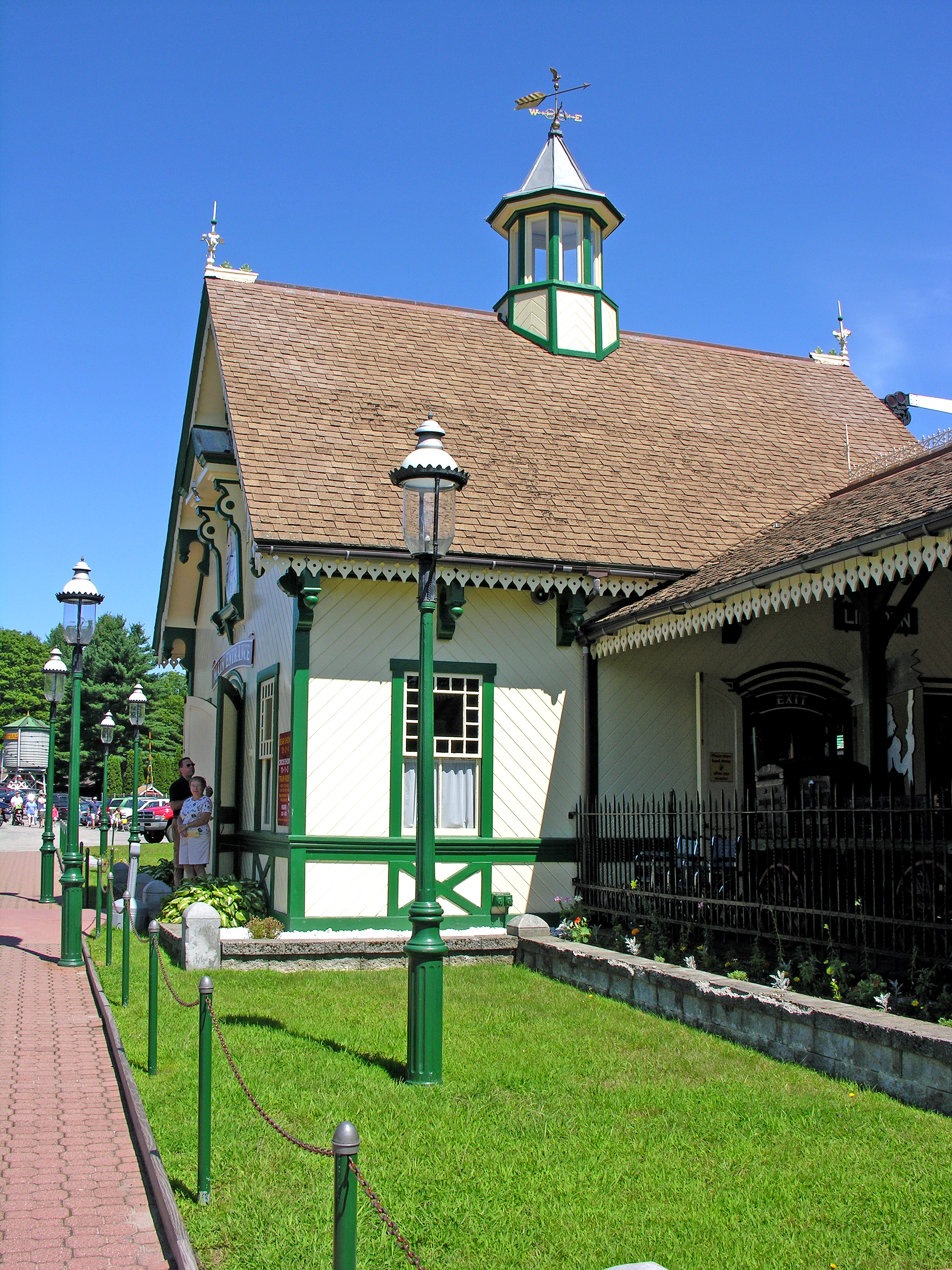

General information
- Location: 110 Daniel Webster Highway, Lincoln, New Hampshire; United States
- System: Heritage railway
- Owner: Clark's Bears
- Line: White Mountain Central Railroad
- Tracks: 1

Construction
- Structure type: At-grade
- Parking: Free
- Accessible: Yes
Location

The Clark's Bears station came from Freedomland U.S.A., after that park closed in 1964.

== See also ==
Other locations with historic trains in a non-historic setting:

- Pioneer Park (Fairbanks, Alaska)
- Rail transport in Walt Disney Parks and Resorts
