= Walter Muir Whitehill =

Historian of the United States and medieval art

- Born: September 28, 1905; Cambridge, Massachusetts
- Died: March 5, 1978 (aged 72); Boston, Massachusetts
- Burial place: Monticello Graveyard; Albemarle County, Virginia
- Education: Harvard University; University of London
- Occupations: Historian, librarian, professor
- Spouse: Jane Revere Coolidge (m. 1930; d. 1996)

Walter Muir Whitehill (September 28, 1905 – March 5, 1978) was an American writer, historian, medievalist, preservationist, and the Director and Librarian of the Boston Athenaeum from 1946 to 1973. He was also editor for publications of the Colonial Society of Massachusetts from 1946 to 1978. From 1951 to 1972, Whitehill was a professor at Harvard University.

== Early life and education ==
Whitehill's father, Reverend Walter Muir Whitehill, was an Episcopalian minister; his mother, Florence Marion Whitehill (née Williams), was a painter. Whitehill attended the Boston Latin School for two years before graduating from Wellesley High School. In 1926, he received an A.B. in English from Harvard University, where he continued to tutor (in art history) for three years following graduation. He returned to Harvard as a student, earning an A.M. degree in medieval art in 1929. On June 5, 1930, he married Jane Revere Coolidge, a descendant of Thomas Jefferson and eldest daughter of Julian Coolidge. He then went to England, where he received a Ph.D. from the University of London in 1934. His dissertation was later published as Spanish Romanesque Architecture of the Eleventh Century (Oxford University Press, 1941). In 1932, he did the first full transcription of the medieval Codex Calixtinus in Santiago de Compostela.

== Career ==
Whitehill was living in Spain studying medieval art when the Spanish Civil War broke out in 1936. He returned to Massachusetts, taking up a position as associate director of the Peabody Essex Museum from 1936 to 1942, while redirecting his research interest from medieval art to American maritime history. In 1942, he went on active duty as a lieutenant in the United States Naval Reserve, where he worked on operation records of World War II.

In 1946, Whitehill began working at the Boston Athenaeum, where he served as its Director and Librarian until 1973. During his tenure at the Boston Athenaeum, Whitehill also assumed the role of recording secretary of the Massachusetts Historical Society as well as a council member of the American Antiquarian Society. He served on the editorial boards of The New England Quarterly, The American Neptune (which he founded in 1941), and the William and Mary Quarterly. Other titles Whitehill held were: editor of the Colonial Society of Massachusetts; librarian of the American Academy of Arts and Sciences; president of Boston's Old South Association; director of the Thomas Jefferson Foundation; and chairman of the Institute of Early American History and Culture.

Whitehill was selected to deliver an important televised address about the history and development of Boston on the occasion of the Bicentennial Celebration of the United States. On July 11, 1976, he spoke at the Old State House in the presence of Queen Elizabeth II, the Mayor of Boston, the Governor of Massachusetts, and a large audience. The text of his address was printed in a publication by the Bostonian Society, which operates the Old State House on behalf of the National Park Service. He delivered the commencement address in 1974 at the College of William and Mary.

Although Whitehill's publishing career focused on Bostoniana, his significant work on Spanish medieval topics represented the first American interest in the subject. He was the author or editor of over a dozen book-length works.

== Personal life and death ==
A 1960 publication described Whitehill's recreations as "gardening, collecting books and prints, printing, and cooking." He was an Episcopalian and a Republican. He lived in North Andover, Massachusetts, where he kept a 15,000 volume personal library in a converted barn.

Whitehill died on March 5, 1978. In his obituary, The New York Times wrote that Whitehill was "regarded as [Boston's] leading cultural figure."

== Publications ==
=== As author ===
- Spanish Romanesque Architecture of the Eleventh Century. London: Oxford University Press. 1941.
- The East India Marine Society and the Peabody Museum of Salem: A Sesquicentennial History. Salem, MA: Peabody Museum. 1941.
- Augustus Peabody Loring, Jr. Salem, MA: Peabody Museum. 1952.
- With Ernest J. King. Fleet Admiral King: A Naval Record. New York: W.W. Norton. 1952.
- Portraits of Women 1700–1825. Boston: Massachusetts Historical Society. 1954.
- Boston Public Library: A Centennial History. Cambridge, MA: Harvard University Press. 1956.
- Boston: A Topographical History. Cambridge, MA: Belknap Press. 1959. 2nd ed., enl., 1968. 3rd ed., enl., 2000.
- The Arts in Early American History. Chapel Hill, NC: University of North Carolina Press. 1965.
- Boston in the Age of John Fitzgerald Kennedy. Norman, OK: University of Oklahoma Press. 1966.
- Dumbarton Oaks: The History of a Georgetown House and Garden, 1800–1966. Cambridge, MA: Belknap Press. 1967.
- Analecta Biographica: A Handful of New England Portraits. Brattleboro, VT: Stephen Greene Press. 1969.
- Museum of Fine Arts Boston: A Centennial History, vols. 1–2. Cambridge, MA: Harvard University Press. 1970.
- Boston Statues. Barre, MA: Barre. 1970.
- With Frederick Nichols. Palladio in America. Milan: Electa. 1976.
- Massachusetts: A Pictorial History. New York: Scribner. 1976.

=== As editor ===
- Captain Joseph Peabody: East India Merchant of Salem (1757–1844). Salem, MA: Peabody Museum. 1962.
- With Sinclair H. Hutchings. Boston Prints and Printmakers, 1670–1775. Charlottesville, VA: University of Virginia Press. 1973.

== See also ==
- Codex Calixtinus
