= Mount Vernon Street Historic District =

Historic district in Massachusetts, United States

- Mt. Vernon Street Historic District
- U.S. National Register of Historic Places
- U.S. Historic district
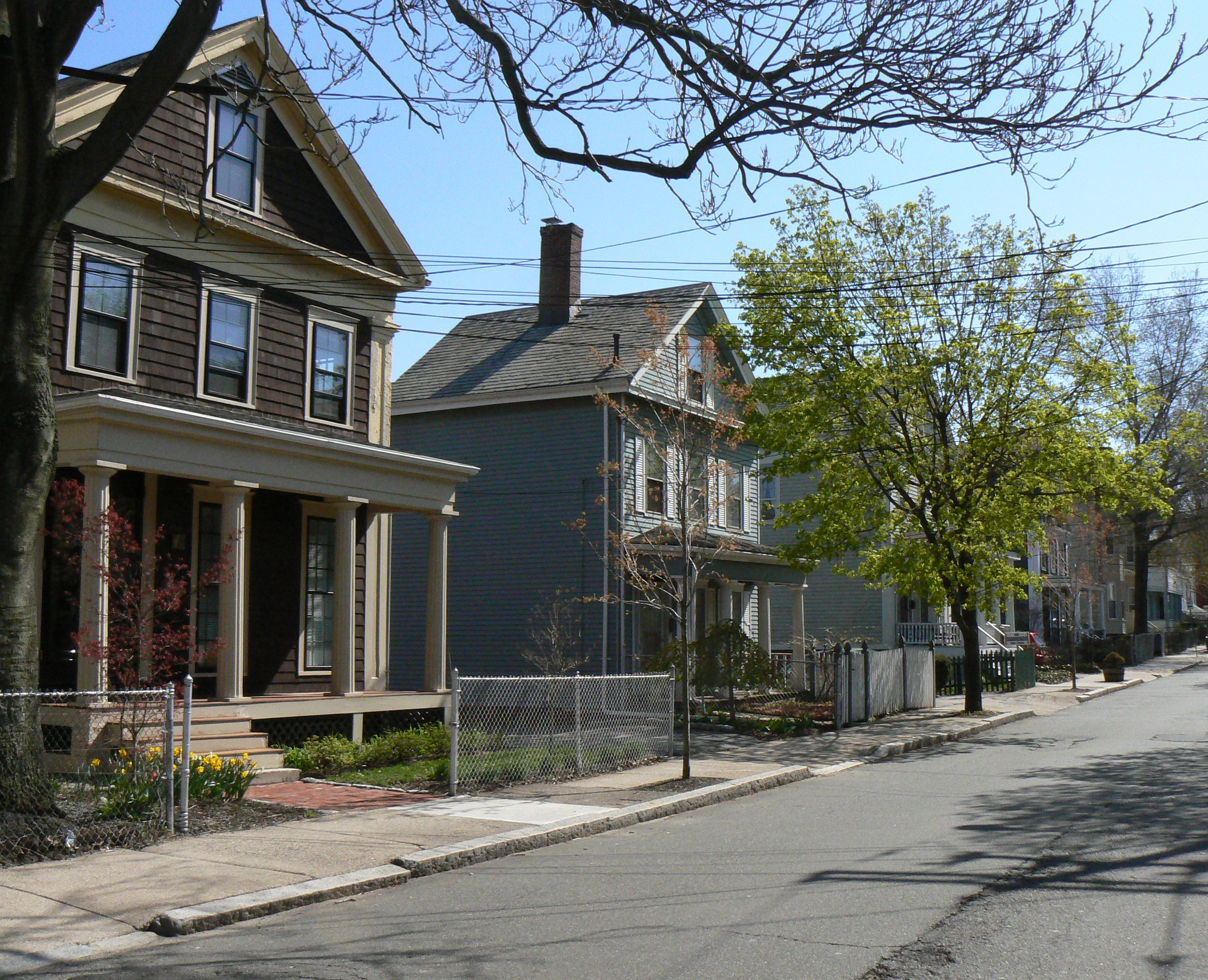
- Mount Vernon Street

- Location within Massachusetts Location within the United States
- Location: Somerville, Massachusetts
- Coordinates: 42°23′8″N 71°4′47″W
- Architectural style: Greek Revival, Second Empire, Federal
- MPS: Somerville MPS
- NRHP reference No.: 89001223
- Added to NRHP: September 18, 1989

The Mount Vernon Street Historic District is a historic district consisting of the even-numbered houses at 8–24 Mount Vernon Street in Somerville, Massachusetts. The district includes four modest Greek Revival houses built c. 1850, an earlier Federal period house, and a late 19th century Second Empire house, representing a progression of housing styles through the 19th century. The houses at 8, 12, 16, and 20 Mount Vernon are all well conserved Greek Revival 1 1/2-story buildings with side hall layout, although #12 has had synthetic siding applied. The house at #16 has preserved more of its exterior detailing than the others, while #20 is distinctive for its use of flushboard siding, giving the house the appearance of ashlar masonry work. Behind the house at #12 is a second house that is some external Greek Revival styling, but has a five bay center entrance layout more typical of the Federal period; it is known to predate the house in front of it. The duplex at 22–24 Mount Vernon has a mansard roof characteristic of the Second Empire style; its construction date is estimated to be c. 1880.

Mount Vernon Street was platted out in 1845, and was located near the railroad line which had been laid across the Charlestown Neck in 1835. The area, which had previously been largely rural, developed as a comparatively suburban area with ready access to Boston, and was one of the earliest parts of what became Somerville to be developed in this way.

The district was listed on the National Register of Historic Places in 1989.

== See also ==
- House at 29 Mt. Vernon Street
- National Register of Historic Places listings in Somerville, Massachusetts
