= Clark's Bears =

Roadside attraction in Lincoln, New Hampshire, U.S.

- Previously known as Clark's Trading Post
- Interactive map of Clark's Bears
- Location: Lincoln, New Hampshire, U.S.
- Coordinates: 44°2′54″N 71°41′8″W
- Status: Operating
- Opened: 1928
- Owner: Privately owned
- Slogan: "Family Fun and Family Run Since 1928"
- Operating season: mid-May to mid-October

Attractions
- Total: Merlin's Mystical Mansion
- Water rides: Anaconda Escape, Blaster Boats
- Other rides: White Mountain Central Railroad
- Shows: Summer Circus
- Website: clarksbears.com

Clark's Bears, named Clark's Trading Post until 2019, is a visitor attraction in Lincoln, New Hampshire, United States, in the White Mountains. It is known for its trained bears and for the White Mountain Central Railroad, a 30-minute, 2.5-mile (4.0 km) steam-powered train ride. The attraction is located along U.S. Route 3, one mile (1.6 km) north of the village of North Woodstock and 9 miles (14 km) south of Franconia Notch.

== History ==
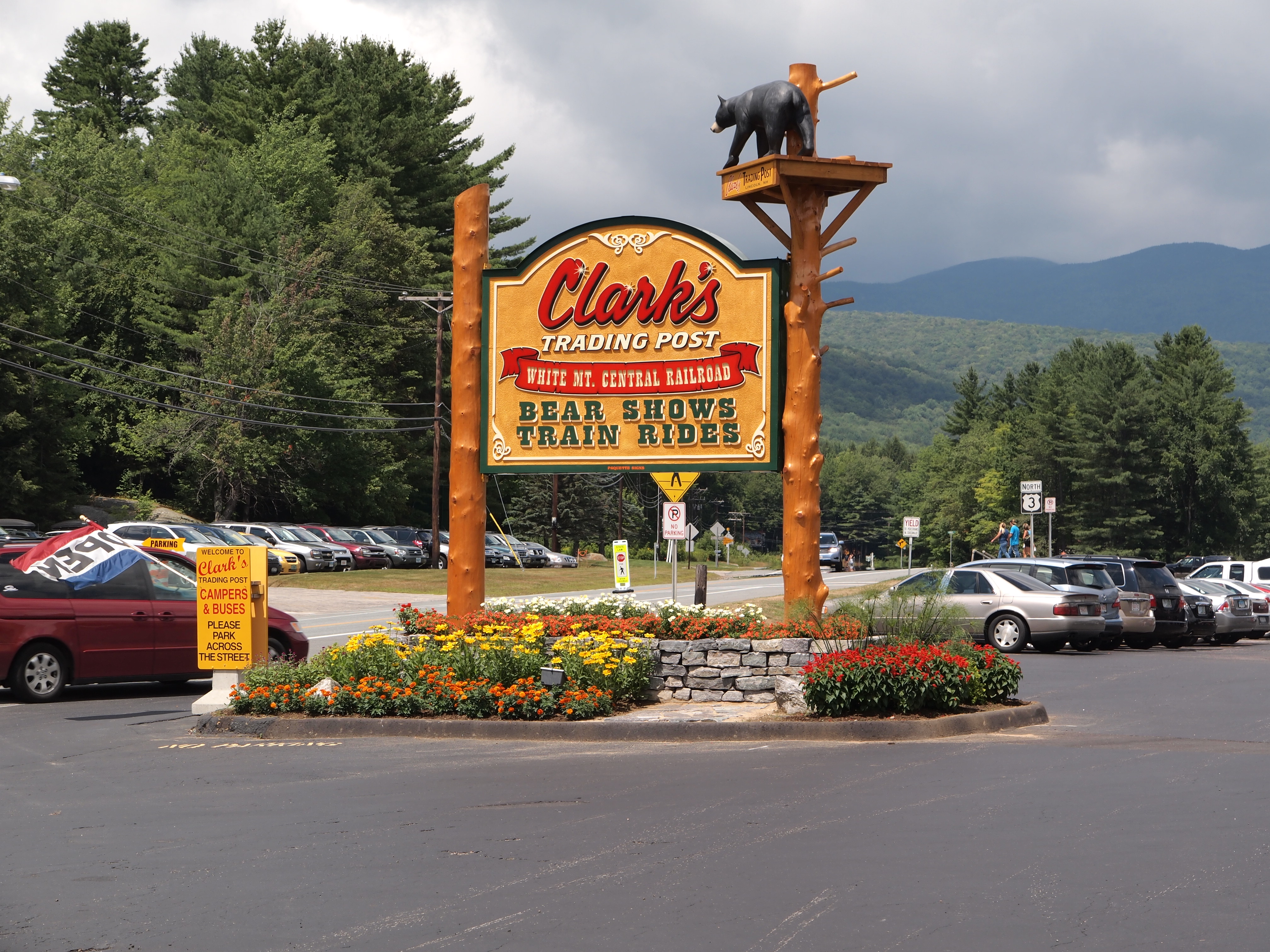
Entrance in 2011, when still known as Clark's Trading Post

The property opened as a roadside stand in 1928 known as "Ed Clark's Eskimo Sled Dog Ranch", selling souvenirs and allowing visitors to view Florence and Ed Clark's Labrador sled dogs. The Clarks purchased their first black bear in 1931 and used it to attract tourists. The Clarks' sons, Edward and Murray, began training the bears in 1949 and created a bear show.

In the 1950s, the Clark brothers began salvaging old steam locomotives and displaying them at the Trading Post. This led to the construction of the White Mountain Central Railroad, a purpose-built tourist railroad with a standard-gauge track. Construction on the railroad began in 1955 and the first train ride was on July 30, 1958.

The railroad includes a 1904 Howe truss covered bridge that was originally located in East Montpelier, Vermont, where it spanned the Winooski River and carried trains for the Montpelier and Barre Railroad. The bridge was purchased by the Clark brothers and dismantled in 1964, then moved and reassembled to span the Pemigewasset River near the Trading Post.

The current train ride is powered during most of the season by a 1920 Climax steam locomotive, and mid-weeks during fall foliage season by a 1943 GE 65-ton switcher (diesel powered). The 30-minute train ride includes an appearance by a character known as the Wolfman, presented as a wild prospector protecting his unobtainium mine by harassing the train passengers.

== Museums ==
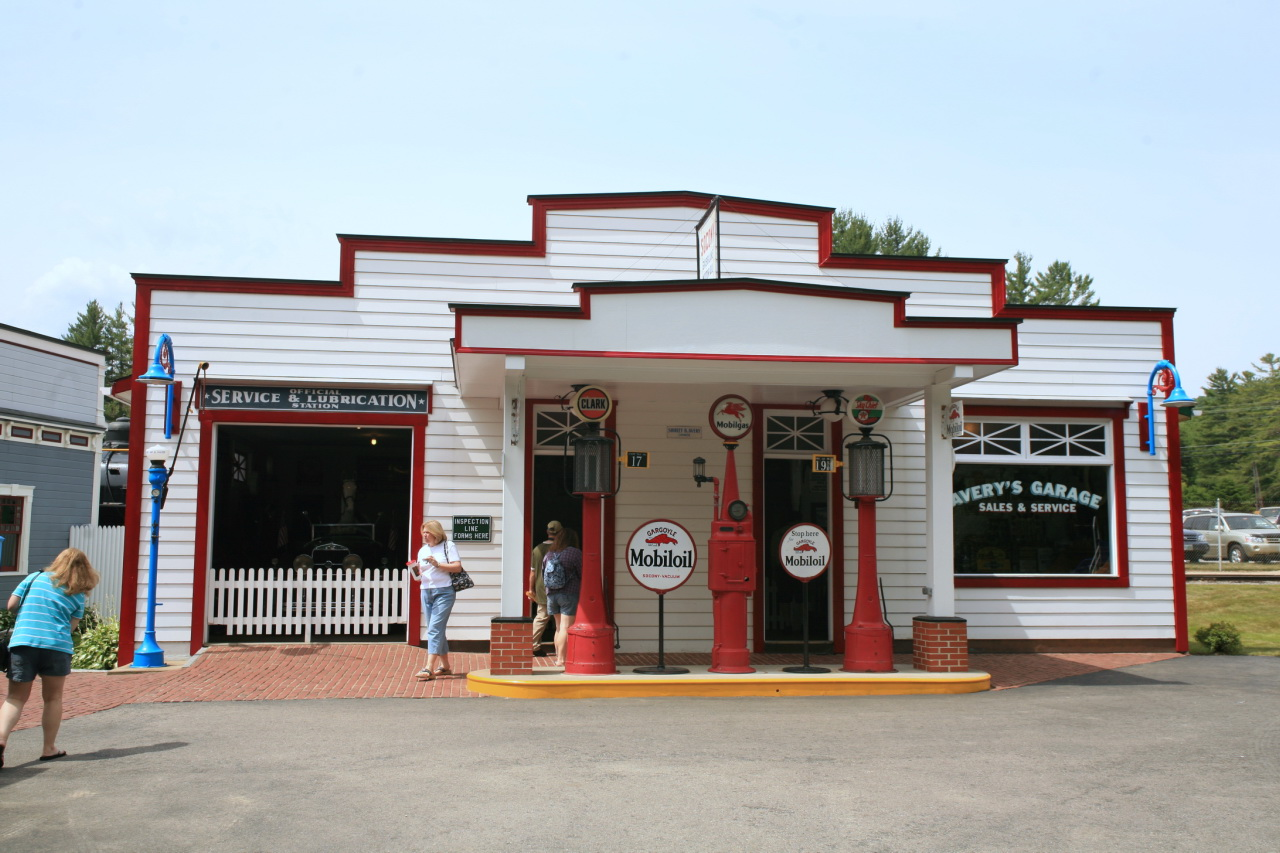
Avery's Garage at Clark's

Clark's Bears includes several museums:

- Americana Museum – collections of American historic items including steam and gas engines, early household appliances, advertising and products
- 1884 Pemigewasset Hook and Ladder Fire Station – horse-drawn fire engines, wagons and firefighting equipment
- Clark History Museum – History of Clark's Trading Post and the Clark family
- Florence Murray Museum – includes antique games, guns, swords, souvenir china, typewriters, railroad memorabilia
- Avery's Garage – a replica gas station with early motoring memorabilia, vintage motorcycles and antique automobiles

== See also ==
- List of covered bridges in New Hampshire, which includes the Howe truss covered bridge at Clark's

Other locations with historic trains in a non-historic setting:

- Pioneer Park (Fairbanks, Alaska)
- Rail transport in Walt Disney Parks and Resorts
