= GE 65-ton switcher =

Diesel-electric locomotive

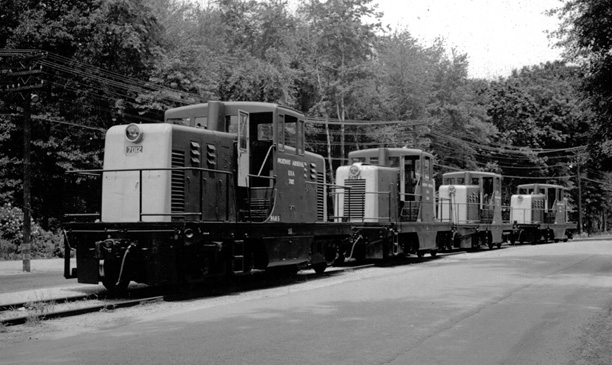
- US Army 65-ton locomotives at the Picatinny Arsenal in 1948. The diesel-electrics were less dangerous around explosives than the steam locomotives they replaced.
Type and origin
- Power type: Diesel-electric
- Builder: GE Transportation Systems
- Model: 65-ton switcher
- Build date: 1940–1976
Specifications
- Configuration
  - AAR: B-B
  - UIC: Bo'Bo'
- Gauge: 4 ft 8 1/2 in (1,435 mm) standard gauge
- Loco weight: 130 short tons (116 long tons; 118 t)
- Prime mover: N/A
- Traction motors: Four
- Transmission: diesel electric
Performance figures
- Power output: 400 hp (300 kW)

The GE 65-ton switcher is a diesel-electric locomotive built by General Electric. It has a B-B wheel arrangement, with models producing 400–550 horsepower.

The 65-ton is an upgraded GE 44-ton with a heavier frame and a more powerful diesel engine.
