= Steeple compound engine =

Form of tandem compound steam engine

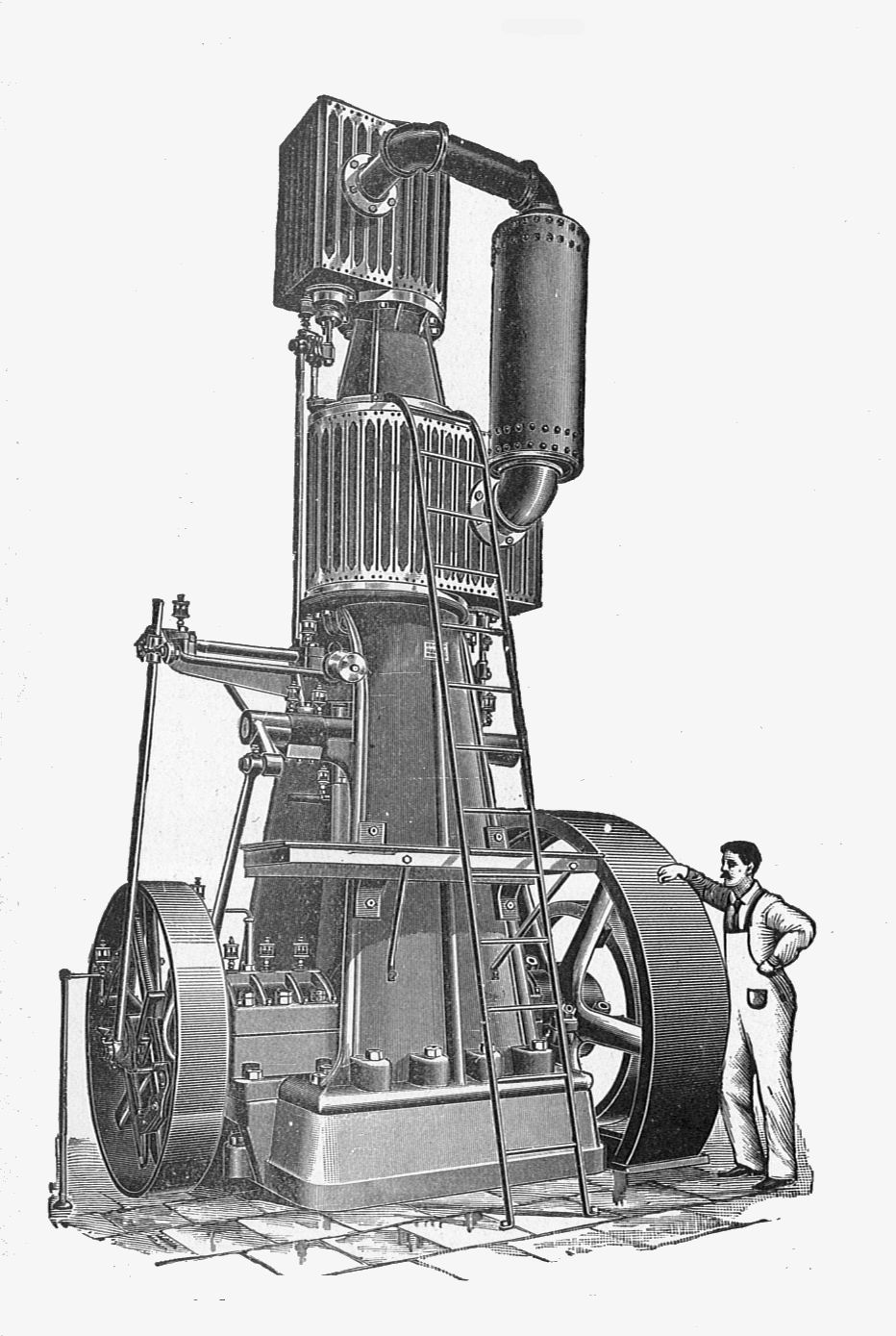
Fitchburg steeple compound engine

A steeple compound engine is a form of tandem compound steam engine that is constructed as an inverted vertical engine. Because of their great height, they became known as "steeple" engines.

== Compound engines ==
Compound engines have either two or three cylinders, in which the steam is expanded in turn. The exhaust of the high-pressure or HP cylinder feeds the low-pressure or LP cylinder. Three cylinder engines also had an intermediate-pressure or IP cylinder, but these were less common than two cylinder engines. (Note: Triple-expansion engines became more common from the 1890s, as increasing boiler pressures above 150 psi made their extra efficiency worth the extra cost. For marine engines, their better efficiency amounted to reduced fuel consumption, thus greater range or cargo capacity. For other uses, the increased capital cost of a triple-expansion engine was not so commonly worthwhile.) In the tandem compound the cylinders are arranged end to end on a common axis (in this case, vertical) with both pistons mounted on the same rod and moving together. Each cylinder has independent valves and valve gear. The pipe connecting them may be enlarged to form a 'receiver', a reservoir for steam at the intermediate pressure. This improves the efficiency of compound engines.

Other than their great height, the tandem compound steeple engine had no connection to Napier's earlier steeple engine, as used for paddle steamers on the Clyde. The vertical tandem compound has been used for marine use in small steamboats, although not under the 'steeple' name. Horizontal space in such boats is often more restricted than vertical space.

== Vertical compound engines ==
The Fitchburg engine (illus.) (Note: The Fitchburg Steam Engine Co. of Fitchburg, Massachusetts, established 1871.) was one of a series of similar engines offered in various configurations. The steeple arrangement required a high ceiling to the engine house, but had two advantages: it took up less floor space than a horizontal engine and it also required less complex masonry foundations beneath the engine. A vertical engine could be erected on any reasonably level base that was strong enough to bear its weight. A horizontal engine required carefully aligned brickwork to support both the crankshaft and cylinder(s) separately. Such brickwork was costly, took time to build and also prevented new engines being installed in old engine houses without expensive rebuilding.

Fitchburg were notable in also supplying an automatic governor (illus., left-hand flywheel) that controlled the valve's cut-off according to load. Such governors would become significant around 1900 with the development of the high-speed engine, where they were used to control speed precisely. In these earlier medium-speed engines, the function of these governors was not just to control the engine's speed, but also to improve efficiency. The Fitchburg piston valves could be operated with a cut-off from zero to two-thirds of the stroke. A shorter cut-off improves efficiency when operating under light loads. Earlier engines had used devices such as expansion valves to achieve this, but they also required the continued attention of a skilled driver, who could 'drive' the engine by varying the cut-off as load changed. The earlier Watt governors only controlled a throttle valve, so although they controlled an engine's speed, they did not encourage efficiency. An engine operating with no cut-off but a throttled steam supply will be operating inefficiently, owing to reduced expansive working and the risk of wire-drawing. The first 'automatic' governors were termed that because they not only controlled the speed, but could also take over the role of the driver and could vary cut-off too.

== Other notable makers ==
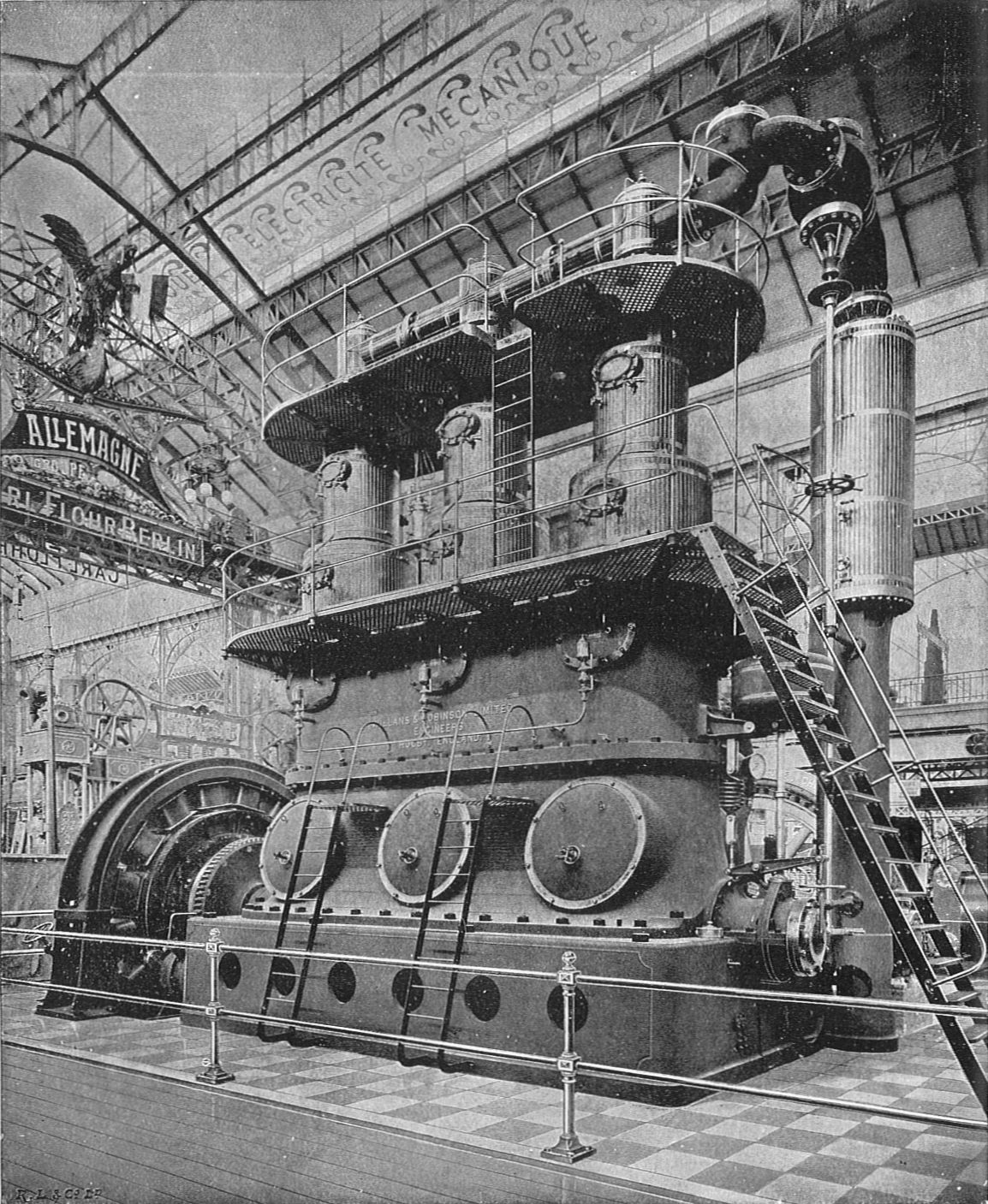
Willans & Robinson engine, driving a dynamo generator

One of the best-known examples of the steeple engine was the Willans engine. These were double- or triple-expansion compound engines, with the unusual features of single-acting cylinders and a central spindle valve shared between all cylinders. By around 1900, more of the Willans type were in service for electrical generation than any other type.

One of the last steeple compound engine designs was the Skinner Unaflow of 1929. Although some were used as stationary engines and generator sets, most were marine engines. The Great Lakes ferry SS Badger continues in service with her original engines.
