= Peter William Willans =

British engineer b. 1851

Peter William Willans (1851-1892) was an engineer and designer of steam engines, in particular the Willans engine.

Willans was a partner with Mark Robinson in the firm Willans & Robinson.

Willans is remembered for his development of the 'Willans line', which represents the relationship between fuel energy input and engine output.

== Publications ==
- WILLANS, P W (1893). "STEAM ENGINE TRIALS. (INCLUDING APPENDIXES AND PLATES AT BACK OF VOLUME)". Minutes of the Proceedings of the Institution of Civil Engineers. 114. Thomas Telford Ltd.: 2–54. doi:10.1680/imotp.1893.20134. ISSN 1753-7843.
