= Engineering Heritage Awards =

Award in engineering

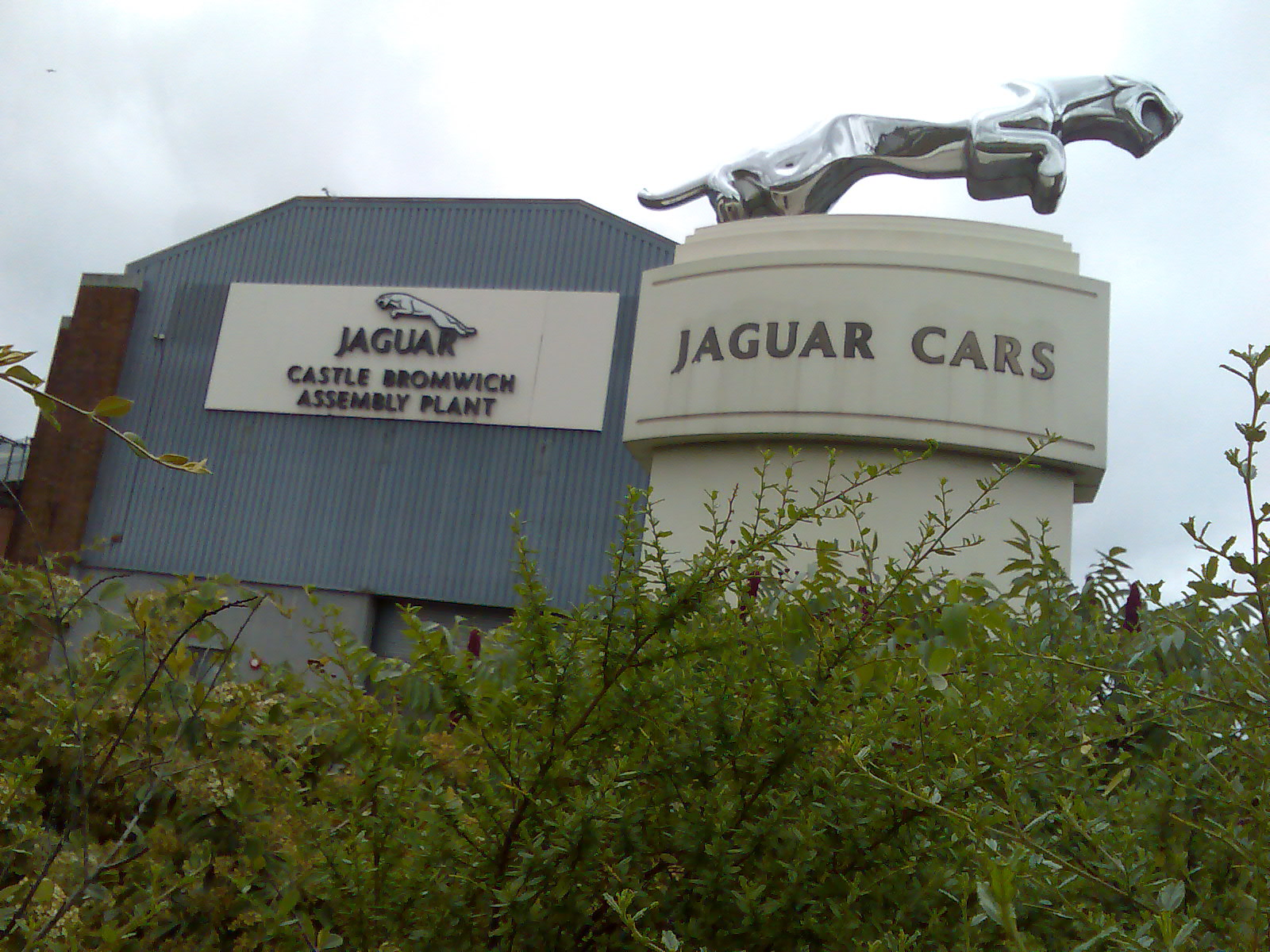
- Castle Bromwich Assembly Plant
- Awarded for: Sites, locations, collections and artefacts of engineering significance which have changed the way in which society lives or functions
- Presented by: Institution of Mechanical Engineers
- First award: 26 June 1984
- Final award: 16 November 2018
- Currently held by: Jaguar Land Rover
- Website: Jaguar Cars Ltd

The Engineering Heritage Awards, formally known as the Engineering Heritage Hallmark Scheme, were established by the Institution of Mechanical Engineers (IMechE) in 1984 to identify and promote artefacts, locations, collections and landmarks of significant engineering importance.

== Development of the Awards ==
=== Engineering Heritage Hallmark Scheme (EHHS) ===
In 1984, IMechE launched its Engineering Heritage Hallmark Scheme. For an object or artefact etc. to be considered for an award, an IMechE member would be required to complete a nomination form and submit it to the Institution. Upon submission, two referees would be appointed, one nominated by the Regional Committee where the object is located and a second independent referee. The submissions from both referees would then be reviewed by the Institution's Technical Support department before a decision was taken on the application.

=== Engineering Heritage Awards (EHA) ===
In 2007, the Institution established the Heritage Committee to relaunch and promote the now renamed Engineering Heritage Awards. It simplified the application process, making it more transparent and with a quicker decision-making process. Furthermore, the criteria were changed, and the Institution's own library and information service became involved in the verification of details being submitted. The Award plaque was also redesigned (see below).

== EHHA and EHA plaques ==
Since 1984, the plaques presented to EHHS and EHA recipients have changed four times. The original plaque was a blue ceramic disc approximately 40 cm in wide. This was replaced in the 1990s by a rectangular steel plate mounted on a wooden base.

With the launch of the Engineering Heritage Awards in 2008, a new cast plaque was created. This was slightly modified in 2009 to reflect the rebranding of the Institution.

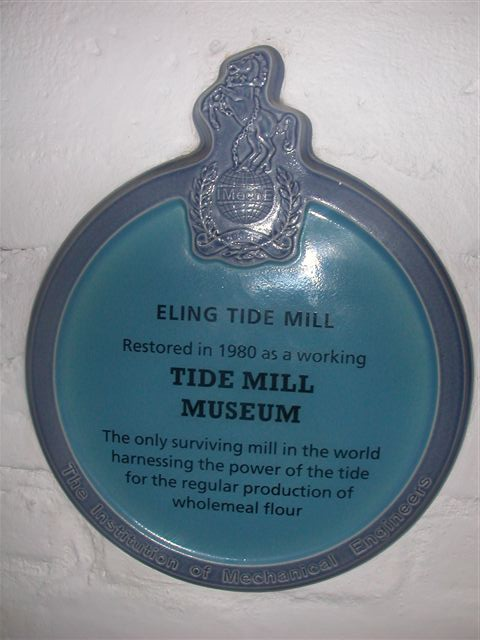
The Original EHHS Blue Plaque which was used until the early 1990s

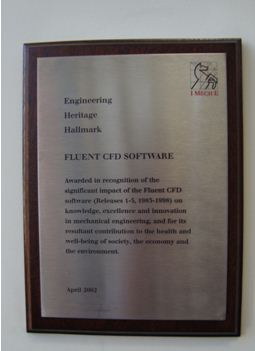
The final EHHS Plaque design. This plaque was discontinued in 2006.

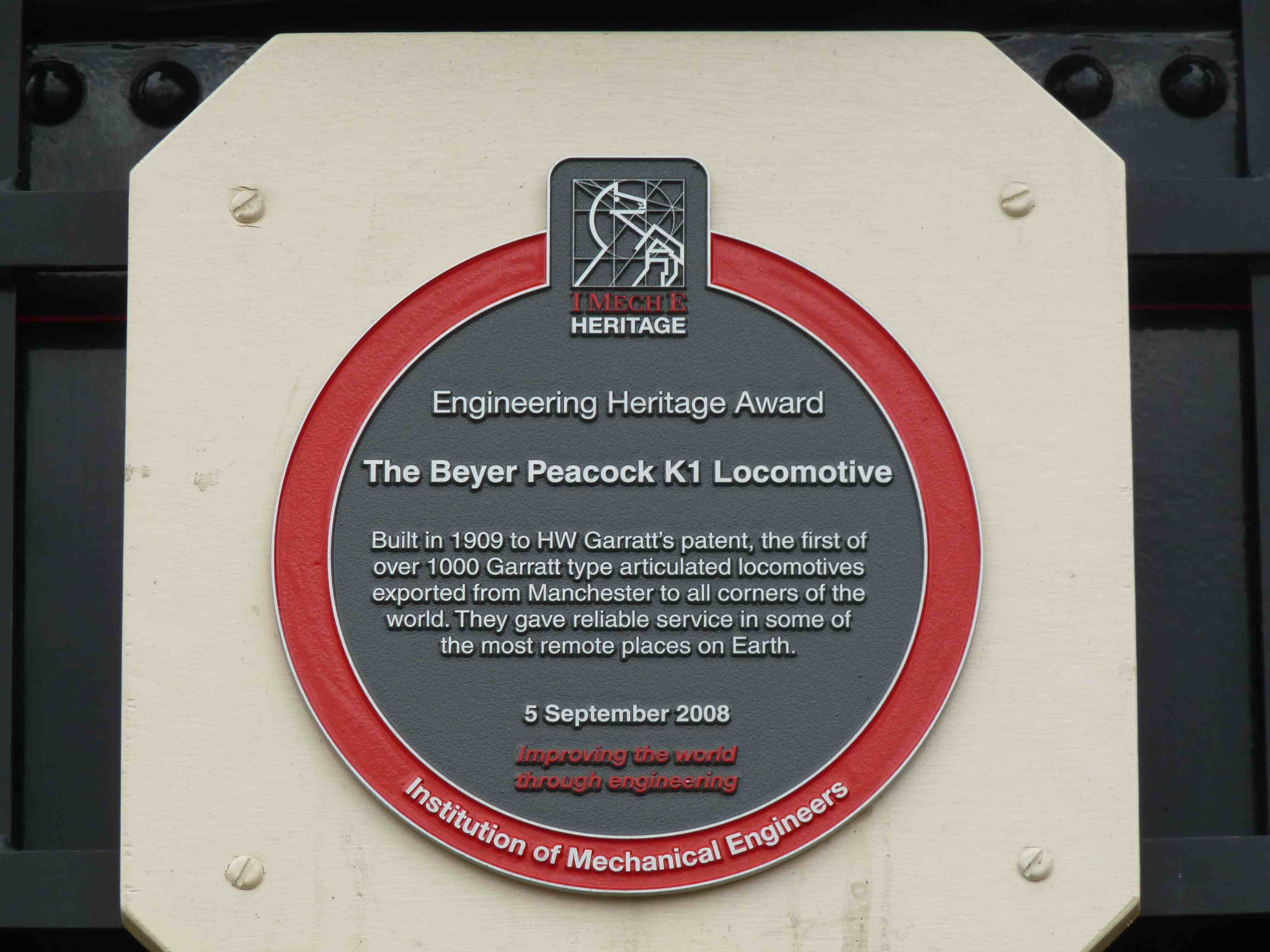
EHA plaque design used for three awards. Picture courtesy of Terry Whalebone.

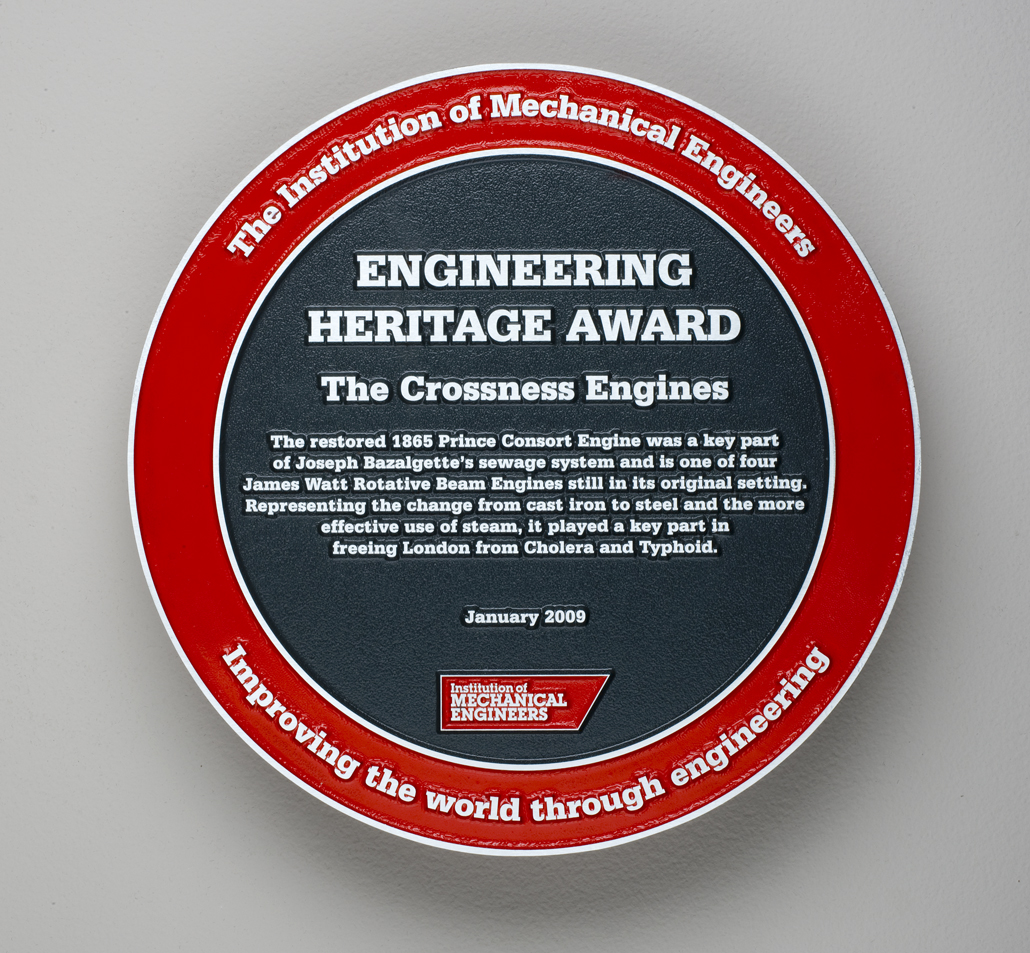
The New EHA Plaque used from 2009 onwards

== Engineering Heritage Award recipients ==
Heritage Award	Recipient	Date Awarded	Location	Citation
1	CA Parsons No. 5 Generator	26 June 1984	Parsons Building, Trinity College, Dublin	This was one of the first commercial machines based on the 1884 patent by Charles A Parsons for a steam turbine and used a dynamo as load. Output 65 amps, 100 volts at a speed of 12,000rpm. Presented to Trinity College, Dublin by Gerald Stone, BAI, 1911.
2	Claverton Pump	28 October 1984	Claverton Pumping Station, Ferry Lane, Claverton, Bath. BA2 7BH	Designed by John Rennie 1761–1821. Built 1820–1813. Restored by Kennet and Avon Canal Trust 1969–1976.
3	Ffestiniog Railway	9 April 1985	Ffestiniog Railway, Harbour Station, Porthmadog, Gwynedd. LL49 9NF	In 1863 the company pioneered the use of narrow gauge steam locomotive haulage. The Fairlie patent design of articulated bogie locomotive and Britain's first bogie coaches were successfully introduced in the 1870s. These innovations led to worldwide exports for British technology.
4	1930 Garratt Class Steam Locomotive No. 2352	26 September 1985	Science and Industry Museum, Liverpool Road, Castlefield, Manchester. M3 4FP	Made by Beyer, Peacock & Company. Established in 1854 at Gorton, Manchester, the firm became world-renowned for its locomotives. Charles Beyer and Richard Peacock were founder members of the Institution of Mechanical Engineers.
5	River Don Engine	10 October 1985	Kelham Island Museum, Alma Street, Sheffield. S3 8RY	A three-cylinder 12,000 hp engine with Joy valve gear, one of the most powerful surviving steam engines in the world. Built in 1905 by Davy Brothers of Sheffield and installed at Cammell's Grimesthorpe Works to drive an armour plate rolling mill, this engine was transferred to the River Don Works of English Steel Corporation where it remained until Easter 1978.
6	Cragside	26 November 1985 (Rededicated 15 November 2013)	Cragside, Rothbury, Morpeth, Northumberland. NE65 7PX	The House of Lord Armstrong (1810–1900), inventor, engineer and armaments manufacturer. His hydraulic and hydroelectric inventions were applied throughout the estate. The house was the first in the world to be lit by electricity derived from water power.
7	Maudslay Rope-Forming Machine	2 April 1986	Chatham Historical Dockyard, The Old Surgery, Chatham Historic Dockyard Kent. ME4 4TZ	Designed and manufactured in 1811 by Henry Maudslay (1711–1831). It was used to re-rope HMS Victory and is still in use today.
8	Eling Tide Mill	29 August 1986	Eling Tide Mill, The Tollbridge, Totton, Southampton. SP40 9HF	Restored in 1980 as a working tide mill museum. The only surviving mill in the world harnessing the power of the tide for the regular production of wholemeal flour.
9	Boulton and Watt Engine	19 October 1986	Crofton Pumping Station, Crofton, Marlborough, Wiltshire. SN8 3DW	The world's oldest steam engine still able to perform its original function. Presented to mark the year of the 250th anniversary of the birth of James Watt.
10	Kirkaldy Materials Testing Machine	28 April 1987	Kirkaldy Testing Museum, 99 Southwark Street, London. SE1 0JF (open on first Sunday of the month)	Built in 1865 to David Kirkaldy's design. This machine established the present-day system of materials testing and specifications of mechanical properties for engineering materials.
11	Tower Bridge	28 April 1987	Tower Bridge, Tower Bridge Road, London. SE1 2UP	Built to the design of Sir John Wolfe Barry. The whole mechanical construction is unique in the world and the acme of steam and hydraulic power of the Victorian era.
12	Post Office Underground Railway	28 October 1987	Plaque presented to Mount Pleasant Post Office, London. (Railway opening to visitors from September 2017)	Opened 5 December 1927. The first automatic electric railway and the only postal railway in the world, providing a unique solution to the problem of transporting large volumes of mail across a capital city.
13	Bellerophon	19 March 1988	Plaque at Museum of Rail Travel, Ingrow near Keighley, West Yorkshire. BD21 5AX. (Bellerophon on loan to Foxfield Railway, Stoke-on-Trent)	Built in 1874 to Josiah Evans’ design at his family's Haydock foundry. The earliest surviving example of piston valves in a steam locomotive. Restored to full working order by the Vintage Carriages Trust in 1985.
14	Huntsman Crucible Furnace and Tilt Hammers	12 May 1988	Abbeydale Industrial Hamlet, Abbeydale South Road, Sheffield. S7 2QW	The furnace (1829) is the world's oldest surviving example of the type developed by Benjamin Huntsman. In its day it represented a great metallurgical achievement. The tilt hammers (1785) are probably the oldest set on their original site. They exemplify engineering technology in the heyday of water power. Together they symbolise the achievement of steel-makers and engineers which provided the foundations of the Industrial Revolution.
15	Locomotion No. 1	19 May 1988	Darlington Railway Museum, North Road Station, Darlington. DL3 6ST	Locomotion was built to a design originated by George Stephenson, the first President of the Institution of Mechanical Engineers. On the opening day of the Stockton & Darlington Railway, 27 September 1825, he drove this engine, hauling the inaugural train, on the world's first steam-worked public railway.
16	Hawker Siddeley Harrier	25 October 1990 (Rededicated 18 October 2012)	RAF Museum Hendon, Grahame Park Way, London NW9 5LL	The world's first operational V/STOL aircraft which entered service in 1969. Developed from the P1127, a concept by the Hawker Aircraft and Bristol Siddeley Engines design teams under the leadership of Sir Sydney Camm and Sir Stanley Hooker.
17	Princess of Wales Conservatory	2 May 1991	Royal Botanic Gardens, Kew, Richmond. TW9 3AB	Designed by PSA Projects and opened on 28 July 1987 as the world's most advanced energy-efficient conservatory. It incorporates ten different climatic zones, created and maintained by a fully integrated computer-controlled system.
18	Thames Barrier	14 June 1991	Thames Barrier Learning Center, 1 Unity Way, Woolwich, London. SE18 5NJ	Officially opened in 1984, it is the world's largest navigable flood barrier and incorporated novel and unique engineering design and operation of equipment. It is vital and effective in London's flood defences as well as being one of the capital's aesthetically pleasing major structures. Project sponsored by the Greater London Council. Consulting engineers Rendel Palmer and Tritton. Operated by the National Rivers Authority.
19	Tees Transporter Bridge	2 December 1993 (Rededicated 19 October 2011 for its 100th anniversary)	Tees Transport Bridge, Ferry Road, Middlesbrough. TS2 1PL	This is the world's longest operational transporter bridge. Since its opening in 1911 it has provided a reliable crossing of the Tees, without the need for approach embankments, allowing freedom of passage to ocean-going vessels. Designed by Mr GC Imbault of Cleveland Bridge & Engineering Company and built by Sir William Arrol & Co.
20	Wortley Top Forge	25 March 1994	Wortley Top Forge Industrial Museum, Forge Lane, Thurgoland, South Yorkshire. S35 7DN	The world's oldest surviving heavy-iron forge, operated from 1620 to 1908. It earned a worldwide reputation for the quality of the railway axles produced in the 19th century. It was a pioneering example of integrated engineering, combining research, design, and manufacture and testing.
21	Thames Water Ring Main	13 July 1994	Throughout London. The Award was presented to Thames Water at its Islington offices.	This is a unique water distribution system with a pressurised closed tunnel ring of drinking water, gravity fed from several treatment works.
22	Theo Williamson's House	14 February 1995	65 Gilmore Place, Edinburgh. EH3 9NU (The house is now a 4 star bed and breakfast)	In this house lived David Theodore Nelson Williamson 1920–1992. Mechanical and Electrical Engineer. Originator of high-quality sound reproduction through his amplifier. World pioneer in the application of Numerical Control to Machine Tools which led to Computer-Aided Manufacture.
23	Turbinia	30 November 1995	Discovery Museum, Blandford Square, Newcastle upon Tyne. NE1 4JA	TS Turbinia epitomises the achievements of Sir Charles Parsons, world renowned engineer and inventor. Turbinia is powered by his greatest invention, the first practical steam turbine, which transformed high speed ship propulsion and established the foundation for present-day electrical power generation.
24	Trevithick's Penydarren Locomotive	7 February 1996	National Waterfront Museum, Oystermouth Road, Maritime Quarter, Swansea. SA1 3RD	Richard Trevithick's Penydarren Locomotive was constructed in 1804 and was operated by the Merthyr Tramroad. This is a replica of that machine which drew widespread recognition of the potential for rail traction of Trevithick's high-pressure steam engine.
25	Bryan Donkin's Rose Lathe	3 April 1996	The engine was donated to the Science Museum, London. It is stored within their archives and not on display.	The intricate patterns engraved by this geometric lathe were used for over a century to protect bank notes and documents from forgery. In tandem with Bryan Donkin's unique pantograph milling machine, the lathe produced high precision compound metal dies for printing simultaneously in two colours.
26	Rolls-Royce RB211 Engine	3 May 1996	Rolls-Royce Heritage Centre, Derby. DE24 8BJ	The RB211 is the first, and at present the only, three-shaft, high bypass ratio aero engine in the world to go into production. 25 years on, it is still setting new standards of reliability and durability.
27	Otto and Langen Engine	10 July 1996	Anson Engine Museum, Anson Road, Poynton, SK12 1TD	This engine (Nº379) c1872 is one of about 1,300 built by Crossley Brothers, Manchester to a Nicolaus August Otto design patented in 1866. It is an example of the first commercially successful internal combustion engine which was introduced at the 1867 Paris Exhibition.
28 & 29	Channel Tunnel and Eurostar	9 June 1997	Channel Tunnel – Folkestone, Kent. Eurostar – Waterloo station, London. (Eurostar has now relocated to St Pancras)	The Channel Tunnel is one of the most advanced and largest engineering projects of its type. It carries both conventional trains and vehicle shuttles and has reduced the time to cross the Channel to minutes rather than hours.
30	Kew Bridge Pumping Station	10 July 1997	Kew Bridge Steam Museum, Green Dragon Lane, Brentford, Middlesex. TW8 0EN	Unique in its approach to the preservation of water pumping equipment, in particular the original installations of five famous Cornish beam engines.
31	The Nottingham CHP Community Heating Scheme	1 May 1998	Throughout Nottingham	The Nottingham Combined Heating and Power Scheme is the first in the UK to produce commercial electricity and hot water for community heating by the efficient incineration of refuse. Reducing refuse to sterile, inert residue and extending the life of landfill sites are additional environmental and economic benefits of the scheme.
32	SS Great Britain	5 February 2000	Great Western Dock, Gasferry Road, Bristol. BS1 6TY	An outstanding example of Isambard Kingdom Brunel's innovative design that made a significant contribution to society and mechanical engineering. It was the first iron-hulled, screw-propelled vessel to cross any ocean. It was conceived as a key element in the integrated transport system from London to the New World.
33	Priestman Oil Engine	29 March 2000	Streetlife Museum, High Street, Kingston upon Hull. HU1 1PS	William Dent Priestman (1847–1936) patented in 1885 an internal combustion engine to burn fuels heavier than petrol. Introduced in 1886, it was the first successful engine of its type in the United Kingdom. The quality of his mechanical engineering has lasted.
34	World's First Prototype Cast Steel Node	30 March 2000	Sheffield Forgemasters, Brightside Lane, Sheffield. S9 2RX	The world's first cast steel node made in 1978 at the nearby foundry of River Don Castings, now part of Sheffield Forgemasters. Used to join the tubulars of offshore oil platforms, the design in cast steel represented a significant milestone for both the development of casting technology and offshore structures.
35	Fluent CFD Software	1 April 2002	ANSYS UK, Sheffield Business Park, 6 Europa View, Sheffield. S9 1XH	Awarded in recognition of the significant impact of the Fluent CFD software (Releases 1–5, 1983 to 1998) on knowledge, excellence and innovation in mechanical engineering, and for its resultant contribution to the health and well-being of society, the economy and the environment.
36	Jubilee Line Extension	19 November 2002	Plaque located at Canary Wharf Underground Station, Canary Wharf, London.	In recognition of the numerous features contributing to passenger safety and access on the Jubilee Line Extension, exemplifying the continuous innovation in London's Underground system from its inception in 1863.
37	The Bessemer Converter	26 March 2004	Kelham Island Industrial Museum, Alma Street, Sheffield. S3 8RY	In recognition of the outstanding contribution to the steel industry by Sir Henry Bessemer through his invention of the Bessemer Process for steelmaking as embodied in this last remaining example of the Bessemer Converter.
38	Float Glass Process	2 November 2004	Pilkington Group Limited, Prescott Road, St. Helens, Merseyside. WA10 3TT	Invented by Sir Alastair Pilkington and his team of engineers, scientists and production workers in 1953 at Pilkington Brothers, St Helens. This process has revolutionised window and automotive glass production throughout the world since the 1960s.
39	Bramah Hydraulic Press	7 April 2005	Kelham Island Museum, Alma Street, Sheffield. S3 8RY	Presented in recognition of the outstanding contribution to mechanical engineering made by Joseph Bramah in laying the foundations of fluid power engineering, as embodied in this last remaining example of a Bramah Hydraulic Press.
40	Gardner 4L2 Engine	7 May 2005	Anson Engine Museum, Anson Road, Poynton, Cheshire. SK12 1TD	The Gardner 4L2 engine was the first consistently reliable, high-speed direct injection diesel engine. Its fuel efficiency, total reliability and longevity were to transform road transport.
41	Robert Stephenson's Works	5 September 2005	The Stephenson Works, 20 South Street, Newcastle upon Tyne. NE1 3PE (public access ceased in 2009)	The Stephenson Works on South Street in Newcastle housed the world's first purpose-built locomotive works. These buildings were the birth of the steam locomotive, which revolutionised the railway industry worldwide.
42	The Vickers Wellington Bomber	19 September 2007	Motorsport and Aviation Museum, Brooklands Road, Weybridge, Surrey. KT13 0QN	The Wellington, with its unique geodetic structure designed by Sir Barnes Wallis, was the most technically advanced of the new generation of RAF bombers developed in the mid-1930s. It served throughout World War Two and pioneered many features used in later designs.
43	The Bull Engine	12 May 2008	Kew Bridge Steam Museum, Green Dragon Lane, Brentford, Middlesex. TW8 0EN	The largest engine of its type in existence and the only example still in its original location. The design was developed by Edward Bull in the 1790s and subsequently by Harvey and Company in Cornwall.
44	Great Western Society	27 September 2008	Didcot Railway Centre, Didcot Parkway station, Oxfordshire. OX11 7NJ	For its work in preserving and recreating the heritage of the Great Western Railway, allowing future generations to enjoy the work of Isambard Kingdom Brunel, Daniel Gooch and George Churchward, to participate and to learn engineering skills.
45	Beyer Peacock Garratt K1 Locomotive	5 October 2008	Statfold Barn Railway Ashby Road Tamworth Staffordshire B79 0BU	Built in 1909 to HW Garratt's patent, the first of over 1,000 Garratt-type articulated locomotives exported from Manchester to all corners of the world. They gave reliable service in some of the most remote places on Earth.
46	English Electric Lightning	12 September 2008	BAE Systems, Warton Aerodrome, Preston. PR4 1AX	The only all-British fully supersonic fighter aircraft type. In frontline service with the RAF 1960–1988, a record for a fighter jet.
47	JCB Dieselmax Engine	9 October 2008	Anson Engine Museum, Anson Road, Poynton, Cheshire. SK12 1TD	One of the pair of JCB444-LSR engines that powered the JCB Dieselmax Car to a speed of 350.092 mph at the Bonneville Salt Flats on 23 August 2006. Presented in recognition of its success in setting the FIA international record for diesel-powered cars.
48	Crossness Engine House and James Watt Beam Engines	20 January 2009	The Crossness Engines Trust, The Old Works, Crossness Sewage Treatment Works, Belvedere Road, Abbey Wood, London. SE2 9AQ	Presented for its work on the restoration of the 1865 Engine House and the James Watt Rotative Beam Engines, which, with the pumps, were a key part of Joseph Bazalgette's sewage system that rid London of cholera and typhoid.
49	The Bombe at Bletchley Park	24 March 2009	Bletchley Park, Milton Keynes. MK3 6ED	Rebuilt in 2007 using the original blueprints. An electromechanical device designed by A Turing, G Welchman and H Keen, used in cracking the German Enigma code during the Second World War. The 200 Bombes built by the British Tabulating Machine Company played a pivotal role in winning the war.
50	Perkins Wolf Engine	28 April 2009	Perkins Heritage Center, Perkins Engines, Frank Perkins Way, Peterborough. PE1 5NA	Perkins Wolf. Designer: CW Chapman. The first high speed diesel engine. The Wolf with its patented Perkins Aeroflow combustion system could run at 3,000rpm and was available for light truck and passenger car conversions from 1933. The success of Perkins Engines was founded upon this engine.
51	Class A1 Steam Locomotive (Tornado: 60163)	23 May 2009	National Railway Museum, Leeman Road, York. YO26 4XJ	Tornado – A1 Pacific Locomotive. Designer: AH Peppercorn. Completed in 2008 using a blend of traditional and modern engineering skills, Tornado is the first mainline steam locomotive to be built in this country since 1960. The A1 Pacifics were the last London & North Eastern Railway express passenger design, able to run 118,000 miles between repairs. None were preserved at the end of steam.
52	Old Bess	16 September 2009	The Science Museum, Exhibition Road, South Kensington, London. SW7 2DD	Old Bess Engine. Power for the Industrial Revolution. In recognition of James Watt's improvements to the steam engine. ‘Old Bess’ was built by Boulton and Watt in 1777 and used to power their Soho Manufactory until 1848. This engine was the precursor of much of the power-generating plant on show in the Museum and is the oldest surviving of Watt's engines.
53	Battle of Britain Memorial Flight	8 April 2010	Royal Air Force, Coningsby, Lincolnshire. LN4 4SY	The Avro Lancaster, Hawker Hurricanes and Supermarine Spitfires of this Flight are a tribute to the airmen who lost their lives in the service of this country and an inspiration to all.
54	Kempton Pumping Station	14 May 2010	Kempton Park Water Treatment Works, Snakey Lane, Hanworth, Middlesex TW13 6XH	Designed by the Metropolitan Water Board under the direction of Henry Stilgoe. These two triple expansion engines were manufactured by Worthington-Simpson at Newark-on-Trent and commissioned in 1928. They provided clean water to the people of London for 50 years. Engine No. 6 (known as The William Prescott) is the largest working steam engine in the World.
55	The Pocket Power Station	21 June 2010	Internal Fire – Museum of Power, Castell Pridd, Tanygroes, Ceredigion. SA43 2JS	Powered by the Bristol Siddeley Proteus engine and conceived by A N Irens, this 3MW unit was commissioned in 1959. It pioneered the concept of unmanned power stations and the use of lightweight gas turbines for power generation. This is the only operational set on public display in the world.
56	Sir Harry Ricardo's First Engine	30 June 2010	Ricardo, Shoreham Technical Centre, Shoreham by Sea, West Sussex. BN4 5FG	This four-stroke stratified charge engine, designed by Sir Harry Ricardo at the age of 17, was built in 1903 and used for pumping water at his family home. Its success encouraged Sir Harry to a lifetime of engine design and development. President of the IMechE in 1944, his thoughts and inventions still contribute to the success of Ricardo today.
57	Bluebell Railway	22 August 2010	Sheffield Park Station, East Sussex. TN22 3QL	The first preserved standard gauge passenger railway in Great Britain, running its first train in August 1960. The Bluebell Railway has impressive workshop facilities and is committed to preserving and developing the rolling stock, infrastructure, skills and atmosphere of a working steam railway.
58	Claymills Victorian Pumping Station	12 November 2010	Claymills Victorian Pumping Station, Meadow Lane, Stretton, Burton on Trent, Staffordshire. DE13 0DA	Awarded to the Claymills Pumping Engines Trust for their restoration of Britain's most complete example of a Victorian sewage pumping station. From 1885 to 1971 this site dealt with the effluent from Burton upon Trent's brewing industry. Among its many treasures is the oldest working steam driven dynamo in the country.
59	Queen Street Mill Textile Museum	25 November 2010	Queen Street Mill Textile Museum, Queen Street, Harle Syke, Burnley, Lancashire. BB10 2HX	'Peace' Powering the last steam driven weaving mill in the world This horizontal tandem compound condensing engine was built by W Roberts and Sons of Nelson in 1894 and powered the mill until Queen Street Manufacturing Company closed down in 1982. Now 'Peace' is preserved and can be seen working in her original location.
60	HMS Belfast	1 December 2010	HMS Belfast, Morgan's Lane, Tooley Street, London. SE1 2JH	HMS Belfast Modified Town Cruiser Class Launched in 1938 at Harland & Wolff, the only surviving major Royal navy warship from WWII. Four 20,000 hp steam turbines, a speed of 32 knots, twelve 6 inch guns and displacing 11,500 tons; HMS Belfast's success in battle is a tribute to her sound design and the skill and courage of her crew.
61	Quarry Bank Mill	11 March 2011	Quarry Bank Mill and Styal Estate, Styal, Wilmslow, Cheshire. SK9 4LA	Quarry Bank Mill A unique collection of working textile and power machinery enabling visitors to experience the whole process from spinning raw cotton to weaving finished cloth. Quarry Bank Mill is a site of educational importance, providing a link for the children of today with children of a bygone era.
62	Bursledon Brickworks Industrial Museum	12 April 2011	Bursledon Brickworks Industrial Museum, Swanwick Lane, Swanwick. SO31 7GW	Bursledon Brickworks The steam driven extrusion plant was installed in 1897 and operated for over 70 years. Restored by the Hampshire Buildings Preservation Trust, this is thought to be the only working example in the country. Brick making machinery such as this was key to the expansion of our towns and cities.
63	Holland 1 Submarine	4 May 2011	Royal Navy Submarine Museum, Haslar Jetty Road, Gosport, Hampshire. PO12 2AS	Holland 1 Designer: John Philip Holland Built by Vickers Maxim at Barrow-in-Furness and launched in 1901, this pioneer submarine was powered by a 160 hp petrol engine and had a surface speed of 8 knots. A 70 hp electric motor gave a submerged speed of 7 knots. Holland 1 was the Royal Navy's first operational submarine.
64	Woolwich Royal Arsenal	2 June 2011	The Royal Arsenal, Woolwich, London. SE18 6ST	The Royal Arsenal 1671 to 1967 The Royal Arsenal produced much of the armaments required by this country during the growth of the British Empire and through two World Wars. Many important mechanical innovations were developed by the first Chief Mechanical Engineer, Sir John Anderson (1814–1886), Vice President of the Institution of Mechanical Engineers.
65	PS Waverley	13 August 2011	PS Waverley (Various Locations)	PS Waverley A & J Inglis Ltd – Glasgow Built in 1946 for the London & North Eastern Railway, Waverley is the last seagoing paddle steamer in the world. She has a displacement of 693 tons and Rankin & Blackmore triple expansion steam engine producing 2100 ihp at 58 rpm. In acceptance trials she achieved a speed of 18 knots.
66	Avro Vulcan XH558 (Vulcan to the Sky Trust)	27 October 2011	Vulcan to the Sky, Robin Hood Airport, Doncaster. DN9 3RH	Avro Vulcan XH558 Designed by Roy Chadwick and Stuart Davies The last airworthy representative of the RAF's V-bomber fleet, the British strategic deterrent from 1955 to 1969, the Vulcan is a stirring example of British leadership in aviation. XH558 was in service until 1993 and is powered by four Rolls-Royce Olympus engines.
67	Talyllyn Railway	30 October 2011	Talyllyn Railway, Wharf Station, Tywyn, Gwynedd. LL36 9ET	Talyllyn Railway Opened in 1866, the Talyllyn Railway is the oldest continuously operated narrow gauge railway in Britain. In 1951 it became the world's first volunteer operated preserved railway. At 7.25 miles long and with a gauge of 2 feet and 3 inches, the Talyllyn Railway is an important part of Welsh industrial heritage.
68	Central Valve Steam Engine	18 November 2011	Alstom Power, Willans Works, Newbold Road, Rugby. CV21 2NH Moved in 2017 to the Internal Fire – Museum of Power in West Wales.	Central Valve Steam Engine Willans & Robinson Built in 1901 at Rugby, this 140 hp three crank compound engine was in service for 57 years. Willans engines ran at 350 to 500rpm and could be direct-coupled to generators. In 1892 they accounted for 68% of all electricity generated in Britain, dominating this market until the advent of steam turbines.
69	Jaguar E-type	25 November 2011	Jaguar Heritage, Browns Lane, Allesley, Coventry. CV5 9DR	Jaguar E-type Designed by Malcolm Sayer under the direction of Sir William Lyons (HonFIMechE) the Jaguar E-type is a direct descendant of the cars which won five Le Mans 24 hour races during the 1950s. It introduced breakthrough motor engineering technology such as the combined monocoque-spaceframe which in later years was adopted by Formula one.
70	Boulton and Watt Engine	20 December 2011	Powerhouse Museum, 500 Harris Street, Ultimo, Sydney, Australia.	Boulton and Watt Engine The oldest rotative steam engine in the world. Built in 1785, it powered Whitbread's London Brewery until 1887. James Watt demonstrated this engine to King George III when he visited the brewery in 1787. This engine marks the start of mass industrialisation and the exponential increase in our use of fossil fuel. 20 December 2011
71	Humphrey Pump	20 December 2011	Cobdogla Irrigation Museum, Cobdogla, South Australia	The Humphrey Pump H A Humphrey MIMechE A four-stroke engine with no pistons or crankshaft, Humphrey's ingenious invention patented in 1906 acts directly upon the water it pumps. This gas-fuelled example, built by William Beardmore & Co., served Cobdogla from 1927 to 1965. Restored in 1985, it is the only working Humphrey Pump in the world. 20 December 2011
72	Locomotive No.1	20 December 2011	Powerhouse Museum, 500 Harris Street, Ultimo, Sydney, Australia.	Locomotive No.1 The oldest surviving steam locomotive in Australia Built by Robert Stephenson & Co. in 1854, this is the only locomotive designed by James McConnell, one of the founders of the Institution of Mechanical Engineers, to have been preserved. Locomotive No.1 symbolises the transformation of social, industrial and commercial life in New South Wales through British railway technology. 20 December 2011
73	Yavari	14 March 2012	Yavari, Puno Bay, Lake Titicaca, Peru.	MS Yavari The world's oldest iron kit-built ship. Designed by James Watt & Co and built in 1862 by the Thames Ironworks & Shipbuilding Co, she was assembled on the shores of Lake Titicaca, Peru and launched in 1870. Now powered by a 1914 4-cylinder Bolinder hot bulb semi-diesel engine producing 320 bhp at 225rpm, MS Yavari is an enduring symbol of the ingenuity and global reach of British engineering. 14 March 2012
74	Titan Crane	5 July 2012	1 Aurora Avenue, Queens Quays, Clydebank. G81 1BF	Clydebank Titan Crane Sir William Arrol & Co Built in 1907 for John Brown's shipyard, the Titan Crane is the oldest of its type in the world. With a lifting capacity of 200 tons, Titan was instrumental in the prosperity of the shipyard and Clydebank's rich shipbuilding heritage. This giant cantilever crane dominates the local landscape, inspiring all who visit it. 5 July 2012
75	Falkirk Wheel	6 July 2012	The Falkirk Wheel, Lime Road, Tamfourhill, Falkirk. FK1 4RS	The Falkirk Wheel Opened by Queen Elizabeth II in 2002, this is the world's only fully rotating boatlift. A sublime fusion of ancient mechanical engineering principles with cutting-edge design and technology, The Falkirk Wheel serves the local community and adorns the landscape. 6 July 2012
76	Short SC1 VTOL Aircraft	4 October 2012	Ulster Folk and Transport Museum, Cultra, Holywood, County Down, Northern Ireland. BT18 0EU	Short SC1 Research Aircraft Designer: David Keith-Jones FIMechE In 1960 the SC1 became the first British fixed-wing aircraft to switch from vertical to horizontal flight and back again. Using four Rolls-Royce RB108 engines for lift and one for forward propulsion, the SC1 advanced knowledge in control systems and the safe operation of VTOL aircraft. 4 October 2012
77	Trencherfield Mill	4 November 2012	Trencherfield Mill Engine House, Heritage Way, Wigan, Lancashire. WN3 4EF	This magnificent horizontal-twin tandem triple-expansion engine powered all the cotton-spinning machines in the mill for 60 years. Built by J&E Wood in 1907, the engine could produce 2,500 hp at 68rpm. Today, it drives the mill's unique multi-floor rope race through the 70-ton flywheel.
78	Ellenroad Engine	4 November 2012	Ellenroad Engine House, Elizabethan Way, Newhey, Rochdale. OL16 4LE	Victoria and Alexandra The Ellenroad Engine The only working survivor of the great twin horizontal tandem compound steam engines that powered the largest Lancashire mills. Built in 1892 as a triple-expansion engine by J&W McNaught of Rochdale and rebuilt in 1920 by Clayton, Goodfellow & Co of Blackburn. Developing 3,000 hp at 200psi, it drove all 122,000 spindles at the Ellenroad Mill.
79	Newcomen Engine Replica	9 November 2012	Black Country Living Museum, Tipton Road, Dudley, West Midlands. DY1 4SQ	The Newcomen Engine Black Country Living Museum This is a full size working replica of the earliest documented steam engine. Built in 1986 using contemporary 18th-century engravings, inventories and descriptions, this engine marks the dawn of the Industrial Revolution. The original engine was erected near Dudley in 1712. It was capable of pumping 170,000 gallons of water a day without recourse to wind, water or animal power. This engine was restored to celebrate the Tercentenary.
80	Lion Locomotive	23 November 2012	Museum of Liverpool, Pier Head, Liverpool. L3 1DG	Lion Locomotive Todd, Kitson & Laird of Leeds Star of track and film, Lion is the oldest locomotive to have been steamed in Britain. Lion was built in 1838 and worked for 20 years on the Liverpool & Manchester Railway before being sold to Mersey Docks & Harbour Board as a stationary pumping engine. Rescued in 1927, this 0-4-2 represents the typical British locomotive of her era.
81	Cruachan Power Station	30 November 2012	Cruachan Power Station Visitor Centre, Lochawe, Dalmally, Argyll. PA33 1AN	Cruachan Balancing supply with fluctuating demand. Transforming electrical energy to potential energy and back again, Cruachan is the world's first high-head reversible pumped-storage power station. Opened by Queen Elizabeth II in 1965, Cruachan can generate over 440MW of electricity during peak demand or use surplus electricity to pump water to the reservoir 300 meters above.
82	LNER Class A4 4468 Mallard	5 April 2013	National Railway Museum, Leeman Road, York. YO26 4XJ	Mallard The World's Fastest Steam Locomotive Designed for speed by Sir Nigel Gresley, Past President of the Institution of Mechanical Engineers. Mallard was built at Doncaster Works in 1938 and was the first A4 Pacific to have a Kylchap double chimney, reducing exhaust back pressure and increasing power output at high speeds. It attained 126 mph descending Stoke Bank on 3 July 1938.
83	King Edward Mine	17 May 2013	King Edward Mine, Troon, Camborne. TR14 9DP	King Edward Mine Mill Training Generations of Mining Engineers Opened by the Camborne School of Mines in 1904 this, the oldest complete Cornish tin mill, marked a major change in tin concentration processes and technology. Restored to working condition, the mill continues to demonstrate to visitors how mined ore is treated to produce finished tin concentrate. 17 May 2013
84	APT-E	24 May 2013	National Railway Museum 'Locomotion', Shildon, County Durham. DL4 1PQ	Advanced Passenger Train – Experimental British Rail – Derby Litchurch Lane Works The world's first self-propelled active tilting train and the first to use computer designed wheelsets and active suspension to eliminate hunting. Powered by ten 350 hp British Leyland gas turbines the APT-E set the British speed record for non-electric traction of 152.3 mph in 1975. Design principles of tilting trains in use today can be traced back to the APT-E. 24 May 2013
85	Volk's Electric Railway	13 July 2013	Volk's Electric Railway, Marina Drive, Brighton, East Sussex BN2 1EN	Volk's Electric Railway Brighton The world's oldest operating electric railway opened 4 August 1883 Constructed by pioneering electrical engineer Magnus Volk, the line still follows much of the original route. Continued operation of this railway is a tribute to his life and work.
86	Lacey Green Windmill	14 July 2013	Lacey Green Windmill, Windmill Farm, Pink Road, Lacey Green, Princes Risborough, Buckinghamshire. HP27 0PG	Lacey Green Windmill The oldest surviving Smock Windmill in the United Kingdom with wooden machinery dating from around 1650. Restored from dereliction to working order between 1971 and 1986 by volunteer members of The Chiltern Society.
87	SR.N5 Hovercraft	13 September 2013	Hovercraft Museum, Daedalus Site, Lee on the Solent, Gosport, Hampshire. PO13 9NY	SR.N5 Hovercraft A new way of travelling. Built in 1963 and powered by a 900-horsepower Bristol Siddeley Gnome gas turbine, Saunders Roe Nautical 5 was the first production hovercraft in the world. This particular craft was used to demonstrate SR.N5 worldwide and train all the pilots for the Inter-Service Hovercraft Trials Unit based at Lee-on-Solent. This is the last example in the world.
88	LNWR 'Coal Tank' No. 1054	19 October 2013	Ingrow Loco Museum, Ingrow West Station, South Street, Keighley, West Yorkshire. BD21 5AX	LNWR 'Coal Tank' No. 1054 Designed by Francis Webb Built in Crewe Works by the London & North Western Railway in 1888 this 0-6-2T steam locomotive was not withdrawn until 1958, having travelled over one million miles in 70 years of public service. With its preservation in 1960 it became a pioneer of today's heritage railway movement. 19 October 2013
89	Little Willie	13 December 2013	The Tank Museum, Bovington, Dorset. BH20 6JG	Little Willie William Foster & Co Designed by William Tritton and Walter Wilson, Little Willie, originally the No. 1 Lincoln Machine, was built in 1915. It subsequently introduced a new design of caterpillar track able to cope with the rigours of the Western Front. This machine pioneered the combination of armour, firepower and mobility that led to the modern tank. 13 December 2013
90	Papplewick Pumping Station	21 December 2013	Papplewick Pumping Station, Rigg Lane, Ravenshead, Notts. NG15 9AJ	Papplewick Pumping Station A fine example of a Victorian fresh water pumping station. Drawing from a 200 feet deep well, the two James Watt & Co rotative beam engines could supply Nottingham with three million gallons of clean water per day. Built by Marriott Ogle Tarbotton and completed in 1884, it was in constant operation until 1969. 21 December 2013
91	Armstrong Disappearing Gun	24 January 2014	Taiaroa Head, Dunedin, New Zealand	6-inch Armstrong Disappearing Gun Taiaroa Head, New Zealand Guarding Otago Harbour, this breech loading gun was operational from 1889 to 1919 and pressed into service again from 1941 to 1943. Mounted on a hydro-pneumatic carriage it could fire a 100 lb shell out to 8000 yards. It was restored to working order by volunteers from the Antique Arms Association and Otago Peninsula Trust. 24 January 2014
92	Smethwick Engine	14 February 2014	ThinkTank, Millennium Point, Curzon Street, Birmingham. B4 7XG	The Smethwick Engine Boulton & Watt The World's Oldest Working Steam Engine. Designed by James Watt, the Smethwick Engine was erected in 1779 and pumped water at Smethwick Locks until 1891. It contains many original parts, including the main timber beam, and was the first engine to use the expansive power of steam. 14 February 2014
93	BT19 Racing Car	16 March 2014	Victorian Historic Racing Register Clubrooms, 30-32 Lexton Road, Box Hill, Victoria. Australia	REPCO Brabham BT19 Racing Car Sir Jack Brabham AO OBE Ron Tauranac AO & Phil Irving OBE Winner of the 1966 Formula One Drivers' and Constructors' Championships, to date the only car to do so bearing the same constructor's and driver's name. The BT19 with its 310 bhp REPCO V8 engine was a novel, effective, reliable race car that gave Jack Brabham his 3rd Formula One championship. 16 March 2014
94	Anderton Boat Lift	21 March 2014	Anderton Boat Lift, Lift lane, Northwich, Cheshire. CW9 6FW	Anderton Boat Lift The world's oldest operational boat lift Designed by Edwin Clark and opened in 1875 to raise boats 50 feet from the River Weaver to the Trent & Mersey Canal using hydraulic power. Later converted to electric drive, it was restored to hydraulic power in 2002 and continues to provide a navigable link between the two waterways. 21 March 2014
95	Concorde	30 April 2014	Imperial War Museum Duxford, Cambridge CB22 4QR	Concorde BAC – Aerospatiale Powered by four Rolls-Royce Olympus engines with afterburners, this was the first supersonic transport to enter service and pioneered the use of fly-by-wire in an airliner. Concorde 101 G-AXDN is the British pre-production version. She reached Mach 2.23 (1,450 mph) in April 1974 and holds the speed record for the fleet. 30 April 2014
96	PS Kingswear Castle	20 May 2014	South Embankment, Dartmouth, Devon. TQ6 9BH	Paddle Steamer Kingswear Castle Britain's Last Operational Coal-Fired Paddle Steamer Built in 1924 by Philip & Son of Dartmouth, Kingswear Castle is powered by a Cox & Co compound diagonal steam engine. The engine, built in Falmouth in 1904, is from an earlier vessel of the same name and drives a pair of paddle wheels, ten feet in diameter, propelling Kingswear Castle at eight knots. 20 May 2014
97	Rover Safety Bicycle	12 September 2014	Coventry Transport Museum, Millennium Place, Hales Street, Coventry. CV1 1JD	Rover Safety Bicycle A Travel Revolution Recognised as the first modern bicycle, its design is still followed today. The low riding position and chain-driven rear wheel allowed this bicycle to be enjoyed by all. It also played a role in the liberation of women. Designed by John Kemp Starley and produced in Coventry in 1888. 12 September 2014
98	Lynton and Lynmouth Cliff Railway	18 September 2014	The Cliff Railway, The Esplanade, Lynmouth, North Devon. EX35 6EQ	The Lynton and Lynmouth Cliff Railway The Oldest Water-Powered Total-Loss Funicular Railway in the UK Designed by George Marks, it has been in continuous operation since 1890. Using the potential energy of water from the West Lyn river and incorporating innovations such as a 'Dead Man's Handle' and fail-safe braking, the railway continues to benefit the local economy. 18 September 2014
99	G-LYNX Helicopter	25 September 2014	The Helicopter Museum, Locking Moor Road, Weston-Super-Mare, Somerset. BS24 8PP	Westland Lynx Record-Breaking Helicopter G-LYNX, a modified Westland Lynx helicopter powered by 1,2000shp Rolls-Royce Gem 60 engines driving composite rotor blades and a titanium semi-rigid main rotor head. It broke the Helicopter World Speed Record on 11 August 1986 when it reached 249.09 mph over the Somerset Levels. 25 September 2014
100	The Old Furnace at Coalbrookdale Ironworks	10 October 2014	Coalbrookdale Museum of Iron, Coach Road, Coalbrookdale, Shropshire TF8 7DQ	The Old Furnace, Coalbrookdale This award recognises not only the work of those early pioneers like Darby and the people at the Ironbridge Gorge Museum Trust who have so ably kept the early days of the industrial revolution alive, but also the engineering spirit of innovation and progress. 9 October 2014
101	Woolf Double Beam Compound Engine	29 January 2015	Museum of Transport and Technology, Western Springs, Auckland, 1877. New Zealand	Woolf Double Beam Compound Engine Designed in New Zealand by William Errington and manufactured by John Key & Sons in Kirkcaldy, Scotland. This magnificent engine was commissioned in 1877 and provided Auckland with water for the next fifty years. It was restored to working order in 2008. 29 January 2015
102	Whittle W2/700 Engine	21 May 2015	Cranfield University, Vincent Building	W.2/700 Turbojet Engine Power Jets Ltd Sir Frank Whittle's turbojet engine is the predecessor of almost every gas turbine in the world today. This example was built in 1943 at Whetstone and had a thrust of 2000 lb. The vision, perseverance and achievements of Sir Frank changed air travel and with it the world. 8 May 2015
103	Stirling Engine	7 December 2015	The Hunterian, University of Glasgow, Glasgow. G12 8QQ	Stirling Engine The Rev. Robert Stirling was granted a patent for his innovative engine in 1816. This model was presented in 1827 to the University of Glasgow by Stirling and used by William Thompson, later Lord Kelvin, in his pioneering teaching and research into the fundamentals of thermodynamics. 7 December 2015
104	Sumburgh Head Lighthouse Foghorn	30 September 2016	Sumburgh Head Lighthouse, Shetland, Scotland	Sumburgh Head Lighthouse Foghorn Powered by three Kelvin K Series diesel engines driving Alley & MacLellen compressors, the Foghorn sounded its seven-second blast every 90 seconds in poor visibility. Protecting those in peril on the sea from 1906 to 1987, the restored horn blasted once again on 15 January 2015. 30 September 2016
105	Easton Amos Land Drainage Machine	2 October 2016	Westonzoyland Pumping Station, Museum of Steam Power and Land Drainage, Near Bridgwater, Somerset TA7 0LS	Built by Easton, Amos & Sons of London in 1861. This is believed to be the oldest working centrifugal pump in the UK still in its original location. Appold's use of curved vanes gave a marked increase in pump efficiency. 2 October 2016
106	B Class Steam Locomotive of the Darjeeling Himalayan Railway	19 October 2016	Darjeeling Himalayan Railway, West Bengal, India	The oldest and largest operational fleet of narrow gauge steam locomotives in the world. Designed by Sharp, Stewart & Co of Manchester, these locomotives have served the local population since 1889. 19 October 2016
107	Rigid-Hulled Inflatable Boat (RIB)	30 July 2017	UWC Atlantic College; St. Donat's Castle, Llantwit Major, South Glamorgan, CF61 1WF	UWC Atlantic College X Alpha Rigid Inflatable Boat The Rigid-Hulled Inflatable Boat (RIB) design developed at UWC Atlantic College in South Wales is in service with numerous maritime rescue organisations and navies worldwide. The unique design combines a rigid hull with an inflatable tube, enabling both speed and stability at sea and safety alongside other vessels or those in the water. In 1963 Atlantic College became an Inshore Lifeboat Station for the Royal National Lifeboat Institution (RNLI). The RIB was developed by Atlantic College staff and students starting in 1964 led by its Headmaster Rear-Admiral Desmond Hoare. Its RIB's provided rescue coverage for the college's sailing craft and for its RNLI Inshore Lifeboat Station. The Atlantic College RIB designs were rapidly adopted by the RNLI from which it developed its highly successful Atlantic 21 and other inshore lifeboat designs responsible for saving many thousands of lives. Numerous rescue services and navies around the world have adopted the UWC Atlantic College RIB design. 30 July 2017
108	Stretham Old Engine	24 September 2017	Stretham Old Engine Trust, 20 Green End, Stretham, Ely CB6 3LE	Stretham Old Engine The earliest, largest and most complete survivor of the Beam Engines and Scoop Wheels which kept the Fens drained. This 60 hp double-acting rotative Beam Engine was built by the Butterley Company in 1831 and worked for more than one hundred years. 24 September 2017
109	Killhope Wheel	29 September 2017	North of England Lead Mining Museum, Cowshill, Bishop Auckland DL13 1AR	Killhope Wheel The oldest and largest surviving William Armstrong water wheel in the world designed and manufactured by the famous Tyneside engineer at his Elswick Works. The wheel, manufactured around 1860, is 33’ 8” (over 10 metres) in diameter and was brought to Killhope in 1877. 29 September 2017
110	Newcomen Engine	21 October 2017	Thomas Newcomen, The Engine House, Mayors Avenue, Dartmouth TQ6 9YY	The Dartmouth Engine Invented by the Dartmouth engineer Thomas Newcomen, the Atmospheric Engine was the first practical steam engine. Dating from around 1760 this example is probably the world's oldest surviving. It worked near Coventry until 1913. Three hundred years after Newcomen's birth, it was re-erected here in his hometown. 21 October 2017
111	Lady Victoria Colliery	6 November 2017	National Mining Museum Scotland, Newtongrange, Midlothian, EH22 4QN	Lady Victoria Colliery The most complete example of a large 19th-century coal mine in the UK. When production commenced in 1895 The Lady had the deepest, largest diameter shaft and most powerful winding engine in the Scottish coalfields. At her peak a labour force of 1,765 produced 2,000 tons of coal per day. 6 November 2017
112	The Edinburgh Modular Arm System (EMAS)	22 November 2017	National Museum of Scotland, Chambers Street, Edinburgh EH1 1JF	The Edinburgh Modular Arm System. The World's first Bionic Arm to incorporate a powered shoulder, elbow, wrist and fingers. The EMAS was fitted to a volunteer in 1998 who used it successfully for 18 months, paving the way for developments in prosthetics that improve lives to this day. 22 November 2017
113	Shirley's Bone & Flint Mill	2 December 2017	Etruria Industrial Museum, Etruria, Stoke-on-Trent ST1 4RB	Jesse Shirley's Bone and Flint Mill The only remaining operational steam driven Potters' Mill in the world. This site encompasses the whole manufacturing process for producing ground flint and bone for use by the pottery industry. The mill was in operation from 1857 to 1972. 2 December 2017
114	The Daniel Adamson	20 December 2017	Albert Dock, Liverpool	The Daniel Adamson The last operational coal-fired tug tender in the UK. Launched from Birkenhead in 1903 the Danny spent the next eighty years working on the Mersey and the Manchester Ship Canal. Her two Liverpool built steam engines and twin screws gave high manoeuvrability and power needed for work on the canal. 20 December 2017
115	George Dowty Internally Sprung Undercarriage Wheel	8 March 2018	Safran Landing Systems Cheltenham Road East, Gloucester, GL2 9QH	George Dowty Internally Sprung Undercarriage Wheel Patented by George Dowty in 1929 and first used on the Kawasaki KDA5 in 1931. From this initial order Dowty was able to establish and expand the Dowty Group. His legacy continues to this day with Safran Landing Systems, a world leader in aircraft landing gear. 8 March 2018
116	Worth Mackenzie Triple Expansion Engine	18 March 2018	Waterworks Museum, Hereford, Broomy Hill, Herefordshire, HR4 0LJ	Worth Mackenzie Triple Expansion Engine Built in Stockton-on-Tees in 1895, this engine supplied the City of Hereford with water from the River Wye for over fifty years. Capable of pumping 4.5 million litres of water a day, it is the oldest working engine of its type in Great Britain. 18 March 2018
117	de Havilland DH.98 Mosquito Prototype W4050	1 April 2018	de Havilland Aircraft Museum, Salisbury Hall, London Colney, Herts AL2 1BU	de Havilland DH.98 Mosquito Designed and built at Salisbury Hall in 1940, W4050 was the first prototype of the DH.98 Mosquito. With a lightweight structure of Spruce, Balsa and Birch Plywood, the Mosquito's clean aerodynamic design and twin Rolls-Royce Merlin engines gave it superlative performance. 1 April 2018
118	1917 RAF SE5a	19 May 2018	1917 RAF SE5a, Shuttleworth Collection, Old Warden Aerodrome, Biggleswade, Bedfordshire SG18 9EP	1917 RAF SE5a The SE5a fighter played a pivotal role in securing the skies over the Western Front during the First World War. The Shuttleworth Collection's F904 was built in 1918 and served with 84 Squadron. It is the only original airworthy example in the UK. 19 May 2018
119	Psyche Bend Engine and Pump System	10 June 2018	Psyche Bend Engine and Pump System, Irymple, Victoria, Australia	Psyche Bend Engine and Pump System Designed by George Chaffey MIMechE and built by Tangyes of Birmingham, England. Psyche Bend was a key part of the pioneering Mildura irrigation scheme. The 1000 ihp triple expansion steam engine driving four 42” centrifugal pumps was in operation from 1890 to 1959. 10 June 2018
120	The Levant Beam Engine	15 June 2018	The Levant Beam Engine, Levant Road, Cornwall TR19 7SX	The Levant Beam Engine Installed in 1840 by Harvey & Company of Hayle. This double-acting condensing rotative steam winding engine operated for 90 years, raising copper and tin ore from 278 fathoms deep. This is the oldest surviving Harvey built engine still running under steam in its original engine house 15 June 2018
121	Tyseley Locomotive Works	18 September 2018	Vintage Trains, Tyseley Depot, Birmingham, 670 Warwick Road, B11 2HL	Tyseley Locomotive Works A centre of excellence for steam locomotive engineering. Tyseley Shed was built by the Great Western Railway in 1908 and has been in continuous use for the servicing and repair of locomotives ever since. 18 September 2018
122	RVH air Conditioning System	24 October 2018	Royal Victoria Hospital, Grosvenor Road, Belfast, BT12 6BA	RVH air Conditioning System Opened in 1903, this hospital was designed around a pioneering ventilation system that fed clean air through a 400-foot long duct to the wards. Temperature and humidity were controlled for the benefit of the hospital patients making this the first public building to be air-conditioned. 24 October 2018
123	Barrow Hill Roundhouse	8 November 2018	Barrow Hill Roundhouse, Campbell Drive, Barrow Hill, S43 2PR	Barrow Hill Roundhouse Britain's only surviving operational railway roundhouse. Built by the North Midland Railway in 1870 it operated continuously until 1991. Restored by Barrow Hill Engine Shed Society in 1998 it forms the centrepiece of a modern rail maintenance facility linking Britain's industrial heritage with today's commercial railway. 8 November 2018
124	Castle Bromwich Assembly Plant	16 November 2018	Jaguar Cars Ltd, Castle Bromwich, Chester Road, Castle Vale, Birmingham, B35 7RA	Castle Bromwich Assembly Plant A World War II Shadow Factory, still showing faded green camouflage paint. Castle Bromwich was the largest Spitfire factory, producing more than 10,000 between 1940 and 1945 in addition to 305 Lancaster bombers. Now owned by Jaguar Cars, it continues to manufacture high quality, high-performance products. 16 November 2018
125	ThrustSSC Supersonic Car	5 February 2019	Coventry Transport Museum, Millennium Place, Hales Street, Coventry CV1 1JD	ThrustSSC Supersonic Car Powered by two Rolls-Royce Spey engines with 50,000 pounds of thrust, this ten-ton car was the first to set a land speed record higher than the speed of sound. In October 1997 at the Black Rock Desert in Nevada ThrustSSC reached 763.035 miles per hour. 5 February 2019
126	Frogmore Paper Mill	21 June 2019	Frogmore Paper Mill, Fourdrinier Way, Hemel Hempstead, HP3 9RY	Frogmore Paper Mill Site of the first mechanical paper making machine, installed in 1803. The Fourdrinier machine was invented by Louis Robert and perfected by Bryan Donkin. Frogmore is the current home of PM4, the earliest paper machine built specifically for research purposes in 1902. 21 June 2019
127	Hunterian Newcomen Engine	19 August 2019	The Hunterian Museum, University of Glasgow, Glasgow, G12 8QQ	Model Newcomen Engine This mid 18th century model shows the University of Glasgow's innovative hands-on approach to teaching. After repairing it in the winter of 1763/4 James Watt was inspired to invent the separate condenser giving a significant improvement in steam engine efficiency. A crucial development in the Industrial Revolution. 19 August 2019
128	The Douglasfield Boulton and Watt Engine	25 August 2019	Verdant Works, West Henderson's Wynd, Dundee, DD1 5BT	Douglasfield Boulton & Watt Engine Erected in Dundee in 1802, this rotative steam engine incorporates James Watt's (1736–1819) inventions of the separate condenser, parallel motion, centrifugal governor and with William Murdoch, the sun and planet gear. Watt's engines gave impetus to the Industrial Revolution. This is the sole survivor to have worked in Scotland. 25 August 2019
129	Supermarine Spitfire K9942	9 December 2019	RAF Museum Cosford, Shifnal, Shropshire, TF11 8UP	Supermarine Spitfire K9942 Built in Woolston, Southampton in 1939 this early Mark 1 is the world's oldest surviving Spitfire. Designed by R J Mitchell, the Spitfire combined strength, lightness and streamlining with the powerful Rolls-Royce Merlin engine. 9 December 2019
130	Farnborough Man-Carrying Centrifuge	22 October 2022	Centrifuge Way, Farnborough, Hants, GU14 6FQ	Farnborough Man-Carrying Centrifuge For 64 years (1955–2019) the British designed and manufactured man-carrying centrifuge at Farnborough was at the forefront of High-G aviation medicine research and training. Believed to be the oldest human centrifuge in the world still in its original state, it is a unique and impressive example of 1950s British engineering. 22 October 2022
131	The Bendigo Tramway	10 December 2022	1 Tramways Ave, Bendigo, Victoria, 3550, 1902	The Bendigo Tramway The oldest continuously operating electric tramway in Australia. The Depot and infrastructure were built in 1903 by the Victorian Electricity Supply Co, a wholly owned subsidiary of British Insulated Wire Company of Liverpool England to British Insulated Wire Co designs. 10 December 2022
132	Bromsgrove Railway Station	11 May 2022	Bromsgrove Railway Station, Bromsgrove, B60 3SF	Bromsgrove Railway Station Bromsgrove Railway Station. Celebrating the 175th Anniversary of the Institution of Mechanical Engineers. In 1846 near this spot a group of engineers decided to form an Institution to “give an impulse to inventions likely to be useful to the world.” The Institution held its first meeting in Birmingham the following year. 11 May 2022
133	Combe Mill	21 August 2022	Combe Mill, Blenheim Palace Sawmills, Combe, Oxfordshire, OX29 8ET	Combe Mill Combe Mill is a fine example of a Victorian English estate workshop and sawmill. Restored by the Combe Mill Society volunteers, 1969–2012, it includes a beam engine and waterwheel. Combe Mill illustrates the impact of social and technological change on this rural English landscape. 21 August 2022
134	Curzon Street Station	24 November 2022	Curzon Street Station New Canal St, Birmingham B5 5LG	Curzon Street Station Celebrating the Institution of Mechanical Engineers' 175th Anniversary. An early example of monumental railway architecture, the entrance hall to the station and the Queen's Hotel. The Institution's inaugural meeting was held here on 27 January 1847. The first President, George Stephenson, was elected and the founding principles established. 24 November 2022
135	Whitchurch Silk Mill	24 November 2022	28 Winchester St, Whitchurch RG28 7AL	Whitchurch Silk Mill A heritage site of national importance, passing on silk weaving skills to future generations of Weavers and Tacklers. With a rigorous approach to repair and conservation and sensitive design of the visitor experience, the Mill has become an inspiring and atmospheric place to learn about its past. 11 September 2024* the presentation was delayed due to unplanned restoration
136	Gouldburn Appleby Bros	28 May 2023	Marsden Weir off Fitzroy Street, Goulburn, NSW, Australia	Goulburn Pumping Station Installed by Appleby Bros., this is a rare example of a complete early waterworks with original compound beam pumping engine, boilers and overhead crane. This immaculately preserved steam pumping engine provided ‘on tap’ water for the first inland city of Australia from 1886. 28 May 2023
137	Tanjung Tualang Tin Dredge No.5 (TT5)	23 March 2023	9th KM, Jln Tanjung Tualang, 31000 Batu Gajah, Malaysia	Tanjung Tualang Tin Dredge No.5 Designed by F.W Payne & Son. Built in 1938, this 4,500 ton dredge operated until 1982. MB Inc. Perak was mandated by the State Government to preserve this last remaining tin dredge in Malaysia. TT5 stands as a tribute to the once important tin industry. 23 March 2023
138	WAG1 20710 ‘Bidhan’	28 November 2023	National Rail Museum, Service Rd, Chanakyapuri, New Delhi, Delhi 110021, India	WAG1 20710 ‘Bidhan’ The first 25kV AC electric locomotive built in India, was rolled out from Chittaranjan Locomotive Works in 1963. This class of broad-gauge freight locomotives were in service until 2002, contributing to India's development. Weighing 85 tonnes, this 2840 HP locomotive could run at 80 kilometres an hour. 28 November 2023
139	Patiala State Monorail Tramway (PSMT)	28 November 2023	National Rail Museum, Service Rd, Chanakyapuri, New Delhi, Delhi 110021, India	Patiala State Monorail Tramway (PSMT) Built by Orenstein & Koppel for the first steam monorail in India, from Sirhind to Alampur and Patiala to Sunam in Punjab. The tramway was designed by C W Bowles using the Ewing system. The locomotive operated from 1909 to around 1927, being restored in 1976. 28 November 2023
140	F1-734	28 November 2023	National Rail Museum, Service Rd, Chanakyapuri, New Delhi, Delhi 110021, India	F1-734 The first steam locomotive manufactured entirely in India. A metre gauge locomotive built in 1895 at Ajmer Workshop to a design by Dübs & Co. of Glasgow. It was used for mixed traffic on the Rajputana-Malwa Railway and later on the Bombay, Baroda & Central India Railways until 1958. 28 November 2023
141	John Morris Fire Engine	28 November 2023	National Rail Museum, Service Rd, Chanakyapuri, New Delhi, Delhi 110021, India	John Morris Fire Engine Built in Salford, Manchester in 1914 and brought to India by the seventh and last Nizam of Hyderabad, Mir Osman Ali Khan, for the Nizam State Railways' Lallaguda Carriage & Wagon Workshop. It retired in 1960 after nearly four decades and is still in working condition. 28 November 2023
142	"Express” EIR-21	18 December 2023	Perambur loco works Railway station, Railway Colony, Seeyalam, Ayanavaram, Chennai, Tamil Nadu 600023, India	"Express” EIR-21 One of the oldest working Steam Locomotives in the world. Built in 1855 in England for the East Indian Railway Co., Howrah. it was withdrawn from service in 1901 and displayed at Jamalpur and then Howrah. Used for Heritage Runs since 2010, after revival at LocoWorks, Perambur. 18 December 2023
143	X-37384	18 December 2023	Perambur loco works Railway station, Railway Colony, Seeyalam, Ayanavaram, Chennai, Tamil Nadu 600023, India	X-37384 The oldest working Metre Gauge Steam Loco with Pinions for climbing on Rack bars mounted on the steep 1 in 12.5 track. First X-Class built by Swiss Locomotive & Machine Works, Winterthur. The Locomotive is in working condition and used for heritage runs. 18 December 2023
144	BMT Lanchester Petrol-Electric Hybrid Motorcar	13 March 2024	Thinktank Birmingham Science Museum, Millennium Point, Curzon Street, Birmingham, B4 7XG	Frederick Lanchester's Prototype Hybrid Car The last surviving prototype vehicle of Frederick Lanchester's pioneering experiments in petrol-electric hybrid motorcars built in Birmingham in 1927. This foreshadowed modern automotive practice and arose from work to build a car for ‘everyman’. Lanchester, a serial inventor, made important contributions in automotive and aeronautical engineering. 13 March 2023
145	Middleton Winding Engine House	26 March 2024	Derbyshire Countryside Service, Middleton Top visitor centre, Rise End, Middleton By Wirksworth, Derbyshire, DE4 4LS	Middleton Winding Engine House The last of eight beam engines that hauled wagons up the inclines of the Cromford & High Peak Railway connecting the Cromford and Peak Forest Canals. Built by the Butterley Company in 1829, used until the railway closed in 1967 and still operational today. 26 March 2024
146	Shrewsbury Flaxmill-Maltings	27 September 2024	Shrewsbury Flaxmill Maltings, Spring Gardens, Shrewsbury, SY1 2SZ	Shrewsbury Flaxmill Maltings Designed by Charles Bage and opened in 1797, the Main Mill was the first iron-framed building in the world. This new form of construction laid the groundwork for all subsequent iron and steel framed buildings. It can be seen as the grandparent of the skyscraper. 27 September 2024
147	Royal Small Arms Factory	22 October 2024	Royal Small Arms Factory, 12, Island Centre Way, Enfield, EN3 6GS	Royal Small Arms Factory The earliest government small arms factory retaining evidence of all phases of its development and still conserved. The surviving 1856 Machine Shop represented a national response to new American mass production techniques. Innovation in small arms here over its 172 years of operation impacted global history. 22 October 2024
148	Humber Bridge	31 October 2024	Humber Bridge, A15, Barton-upon-Humber DN18 5RF	Humber Bridge An engineering icon since its completion in 1981, when it was the longest single-span suspension bridge in the world. A Grade I listed structure, it stands testament to the skills of the designers and engineers, and the custodians who continue to maintain it and its complex systems. 31 October 2024
149	19th C MODEL OF THE GWR GOODS ENGINE	2 December 2024	Trinity College Dublin, Parsons Building The University of Dublin, College Green, Dublin 2	19th C MODEL OF THE GWR GOODS ENGINE, PYRACMON Part of a pioneering approach to teaching engineering, this unique large scale model of a GWR broad gauge goods engine was made in 1854 by Kennan & Son of Dublin. Designed by Sir Daniel Gooch, the original locomotive was built at Swindon in 1847 and served for 25 years. 2 December 2024
150	Hong Kong Tramway ( Ding Ding)	19 July 2025	Hong Kong Tramways Limited, Whitty Street Tram Depot, Connaught Road West, Western District, Hong Kong	Hongkong Tamway (Ding Ding) Hong Kong Tramways, started in 1904, distinguishes itself from other old tram systems through its double-decker design, extensive network, continuous operation, cultural significance, integration with the cityscape, affordable price and sustainability. These unique features contribute to its enduring popularity and make it a cherished part of Hong Kong's transportation heritage. 19 July 2025
151	Thomas Kirk Wright (ON 811) - Surf 32 ft Motor Lifeboat	22 May 2025	Poole Old Lifeboat Museum and Shop Fisherman's Dock, Poole Dorset BH15 1HU	Thomas Kirk Wright (ON 811) -Surf 32 ft Motor Lifeboat This Surf Class Lifeboat used Hotchkiss internal cone propellers to enable the boat to operate close to shore without damaging its propellers, which was invaluable during its service assisting the Dunkirk Evacuations. This propulsion system was a forerunner of the waterjets used on the latest Shannon Lifeboats. 22 May 2025
152	Brocklands Stratosphere Chamber	15 July 2025	Brooklands Museum, located at Brooklands Drive, Weybridge, Surrey, KT13 0SL	Brocklands Stratosphere This 180 ton chamber, brainchild of Barnes Wallis, was built in 1946 to test aircraft equipment and structures under controlled conditions. Recreating almost any environment; temperatures from -65 °C to +55 °C, air pressure from sea level to 70,000 feet, solar radiation, ice, snow and 40 knot winds. 15 July 2025
153	New Zealand EF Class locomotives	25 May 2025	Operate on North Island Main Trunk (NIMT) between Palmerston North and Te Rapa. Kiwi Rail Office Level 4, Wellington Railway Station, Bunny Street, Wellington 6011, New Zealand	New Zealand EF Class Locomotives The EF class locomotive was designed in response to a uniquely New Zealand requirement for a heavy duty locomotive using renewable energy. Designed in the 1980s it made use of United Kingdom engineering expertise. Upgrades and maintenance have allowed it to remain in continuous service and its design evolved as the motive power for the Channel Tunnel in the UK. July 2025
154	Vickers F. B 27A Vimy F8630	25 May 2025	1 James Schofield Dr, Adelaide Airport SA 5950, Australia	Vickers F.B 27A Vimy F8630 On 10 December 1919 this aircraft was the first to fly from England to Australia. This ground-breaking 28 day journey paved the way for future trans-global flights. Designed by Rex Pierson, this is one of two surviving airframes, the other, in 1919, completed the first trans-Atlantic flight. 25 May 2025
155	Cavenagh Bridge	November 2025	1 Fullerton Square, Singapore 049178	Cavenagh Bridge The oldest bridge between the north and south banks of the Singapore River providing easier access for the growing population. The bridge, uses the unusual "Ordish-Lefeuvre system" of angled link supports for the bridge deck instead of conventional vertical links. November 2025
156	Sandfields Pumping Station	18 October 2025	Chesterfield Rd, Lichfield WS14 0AA	Sandfields Pumping Station The Sandfields Pumping Station was the first built for the South Staffordshire Waterworks Company to provide clean water to the industrial towns of the Black Country. The Cornish beam engine, operational from 1873 to 1927, could pump up to 2 million gallons of water per day. 18 October 2025
157	Freddie the Robot	TBC		
158	Scarborough Spa Cliff Lift	23 March 2026	Scarborough Spa Southbay, YO11 2HD	First funicular railway in the United Kingdom Opened in 1875 and still in operation, playing a transformative role in Scarborough’s development and inspiring other cliff railways. Designed by William Lucas and constructed by the Crossley Brothers, using a water counterbalance system powered by two gas engines.
159	Coffin Works	25 March 2026	The Coffin Works Museum 13-15 Fleet Street Jewellery Quarter Birmingham B3 1JP	Established in 1894, the Newman Brothers Coffin Works operated until 1999. The restored site reopened in 2014 and remains the only surviving purpose‑built coffin furniture manufactory in the United Kingdom, with original machinery and industrial processes still in working order.
160	Locomotive 1076	31 October 2026	Goulburn Rail Heritage Centre 12 Braidwood Road Goulburn, New South Wales, Australia	Built in 1883 by the Vulcan Foundry, Newton le Willows, England to a design prepared by Thomas Midelton, Locomotive Overseer at the New South Wales Government Railways and a member of the Institution of Mechanical Engineers. This locomotive had a working life of 86 years, retiring in 1970.

== See also ==
- List of mechanical engineering awards
- Engineers Australia § Engineering Heritage Recognition Program
