= Tan-y-groes =

Village in Ceredigion, Wales

Coordinates: 52.115945°N 4.505632°W

- Location within Ceredigion
- OS grid reference: SN 2854 4936
  - Cardiff: 71.9 mi (115.7 km)
  - London: 191.8 mi (308.7 km)
- Community: Penbryn
- Principal area: Ceredigion
- Country: Wales
- Sovereign state: United Kingdom
- Post town: Cardigan
- Postcode district: SA43
- Police: Dyfed-Powys
- Fire: Mid and West Wales
- Ambulance: Welsh
- UK Parliament: Ceredigion Preseli
- Senedd Cymru – Welsh Parliament: Ceredigion

Tan-y-groes (or Tanygroes) is a hamlet in the community of Penbryn, Ceredigion, Wales, which is 11 km (7 mi) east of Cardigan on the A487 trunk road. Tan-y-groes is represented in the Senedd by Elin Jones (Plaid Cymru) and the Member of Parliament is Ben Lake (Plaid Cymru).

== Etymology ==
The name derives from the Welsh language and means "under the cross".

== Internal Fire Museum of Power ==
The Internal Fire Museum of Power in Tan-y-groes displays a collection of internal combustion engines and steam engines, many of which are operational.

== Distillery ==
The 'In the Welsh Wind' distillery in Tan-y-groes makes gin, whisky and other spirits. It was established in 2018 and in 2021 received permission to extend and develop its building.
