= Willans & Robinson =

English engine manufacturer

Willans & Robinson Limited manufacturing engineers of Thames Ditton, Surrey. Later, from 1896, at Victoria Works, Rugby, Warwickshire, England. They were manufacturers of stationary reciprocating steam engines then steam turbines, diesel motors and generators. They also ran their own foundry.

During World War I it became necessary to sell control of the business to Dick, Kerr & Co. They soon went into the English Electric grouping but Willans & Robinson retained its identity and some independent shareholders until 1935 when it was liquidated.

In the 21st century Willans & Robinson's business is represented by Alstom where it was taken by GEC in 1989 along with English Electric.

== Ferry Works, Thames Ditton ==
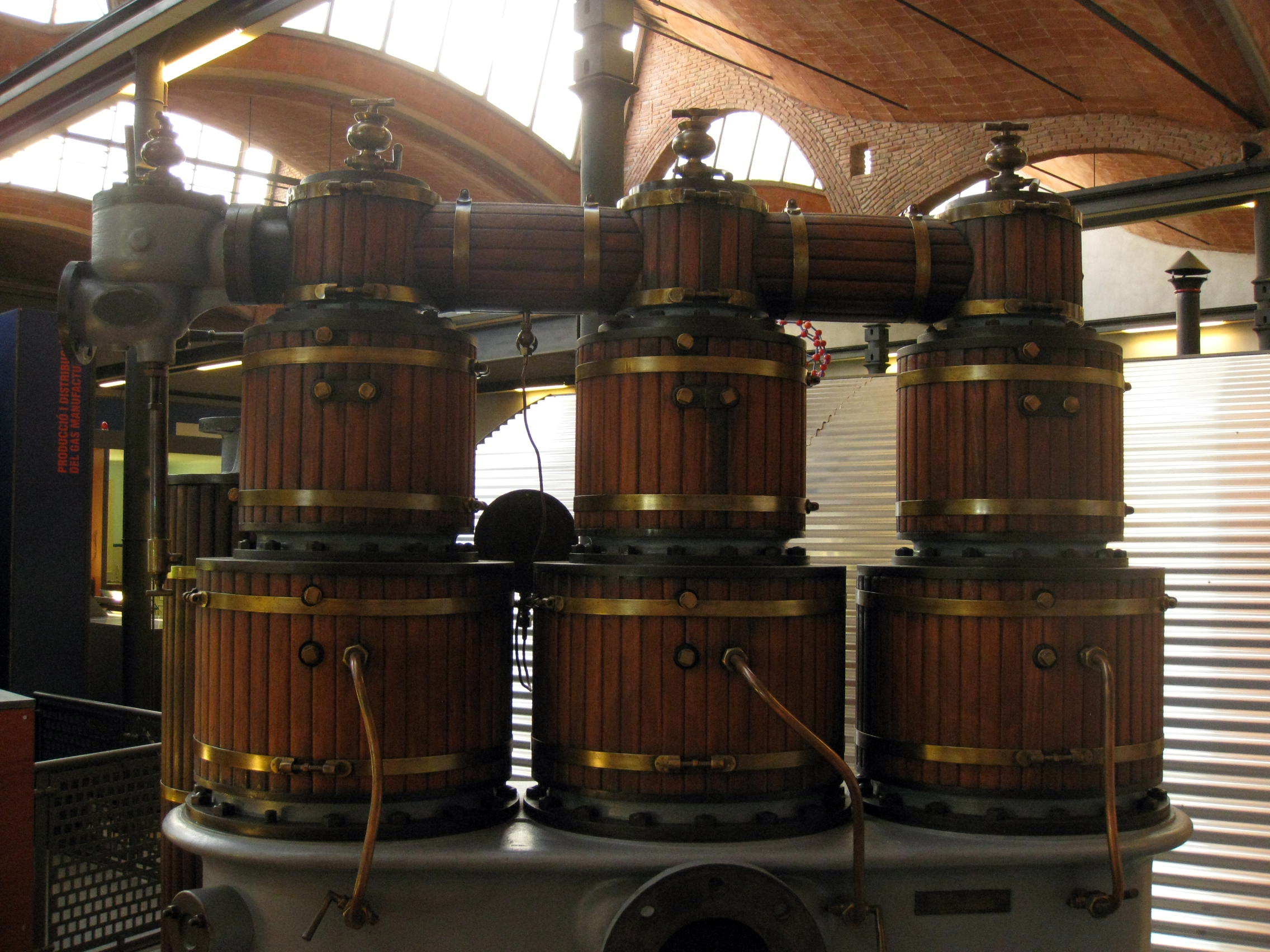
High speed reciprocating steam engine

The business was founded by Peter William Willans (1851-1892) and Mark Robinson (1844-1923) in the 1870s at their Ferry Works site to manufacture high speed reciprocating steam engines for launches. The major advance was that Willan's engines had all working parts enclosed and they were splash-lubricated, this was new. They soon employed some 400 people.

The rise of the electricity industry created a new demand for their engines, which were designed to operate at a constant speed and were ideal for electricity generation. At their peak their central valve engines provided 68% of Britain's installed capacity for generation of electricity.

In this period of prosperity Willans was able to improve his designs and develop better manufacturing techniques, particularly the use of standardised interchangeable components. His research into the performance of his engines won him the reputation of having a scientific approach.

Willans was the engineer, Robinson found the capital. Their new buildings at Thames Ditton (1888), Queensferry (1899) and Rugby (1896) were all of high quality and distinguished design. Son of a General and by profession a military engineer H Riall Sankey joined the board in 1889 and was appointed chief engineer following Willans' death shortly after being thrown from his dog cart on the way to Brookwood Station. Sankey designed the new works at Rugby and remained with the business and a board-member until 1905 when he left to become a consulting engineer.

The Thames Ditton works were destroyed by fire in 1888 but they were rebuilt to a new and better design. That same year they formed a limited liability company to own the business. The partners and their friends subscribed for the first issue of shares and none were offered to the public. Following Peter Willans death the remaining shareholders decided to issue new shares to the public to raise capital to expand operations and meet demand for the company's engines and in particular for the large engines required to drive cotton and flax mills. The new shares were listed on the London Stock Exchange in July 1894.

The works were severely damaged by flood in 1894. Willans & Robinson moved their operation to Rugby in 1896 but Ferry Works at Ditton remained in use until 1980 by AC Cars.

== Queensferry ==
A new building in Pentre, Deeside, Flintshire CH5 2DA was built in 1899 for the manufacture of water tube boilers and special steels. Advertised for sale as early as 1907 the workshops area was 150,000 square feet and it had a 1200 feet frontage to the LNW main line. Its operation was closed in 1910.
The building was described by Nikolaus Pevsner as "the most advanced British building of its date".

== Victoria Works, Rugby ==
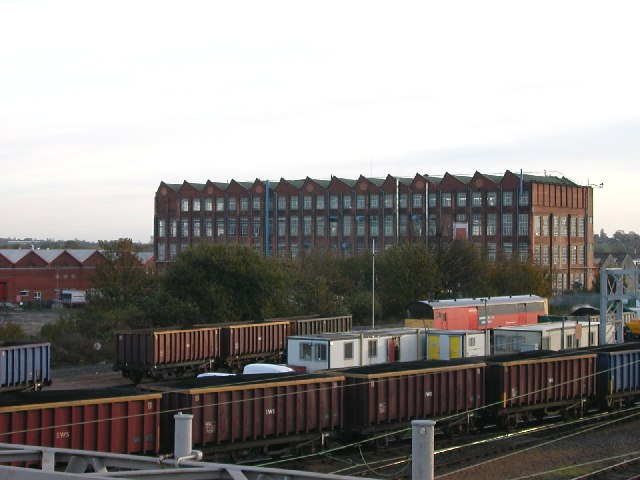
Victoria Works, Rugby 2005

Soon after establishing their own fine new Victoria Works in 1896 at Newbold Road, Rugby. CV21 2NH, Willans & Robinson began the switch to steam turbines to match the efficiency of their competition's double-acting designs. After new designer H F Fullagar left the business C A Parsons and later Curtis designs were built under licence.

English Electric's success with diesel-electric traction sprang from the pioneering work carried out at Willans & Robinson, Rugby, from 1904.

In October 1908 the chairman reported to shareholders that the new metallic filament lamps had much reduced the demand for electricity and, while it would doubtless be followed by a great extension of demand, for the present there was a check on the sale of steam turbines. There was however some expansion in demand for Diesel engines and condensing plants.

In March 1909 it was announced Willans & Robinson would be manufacturing water turbines, both Pelton and low-pressure wheels.

Through World War I Salmson aero engines were manufactured under licence.

In 1916 control of Willans & Robinson (86% later increased to 93% of the capital) was sold to Dick, Kerr & Co.

A 1901 Willans engine generating set was retired in 1957 and placed on display here. In 2011 this was recognised with an Engineering Heritage Award. In 2017 it was transferred to the Internal Fire – Museum of Power in West Wales.

== Notable alumni ==
- Geoffrey de Havilland
