= Perambur Loco Works railway station =

Railway station in Chennai, India

Perambur Loco Works
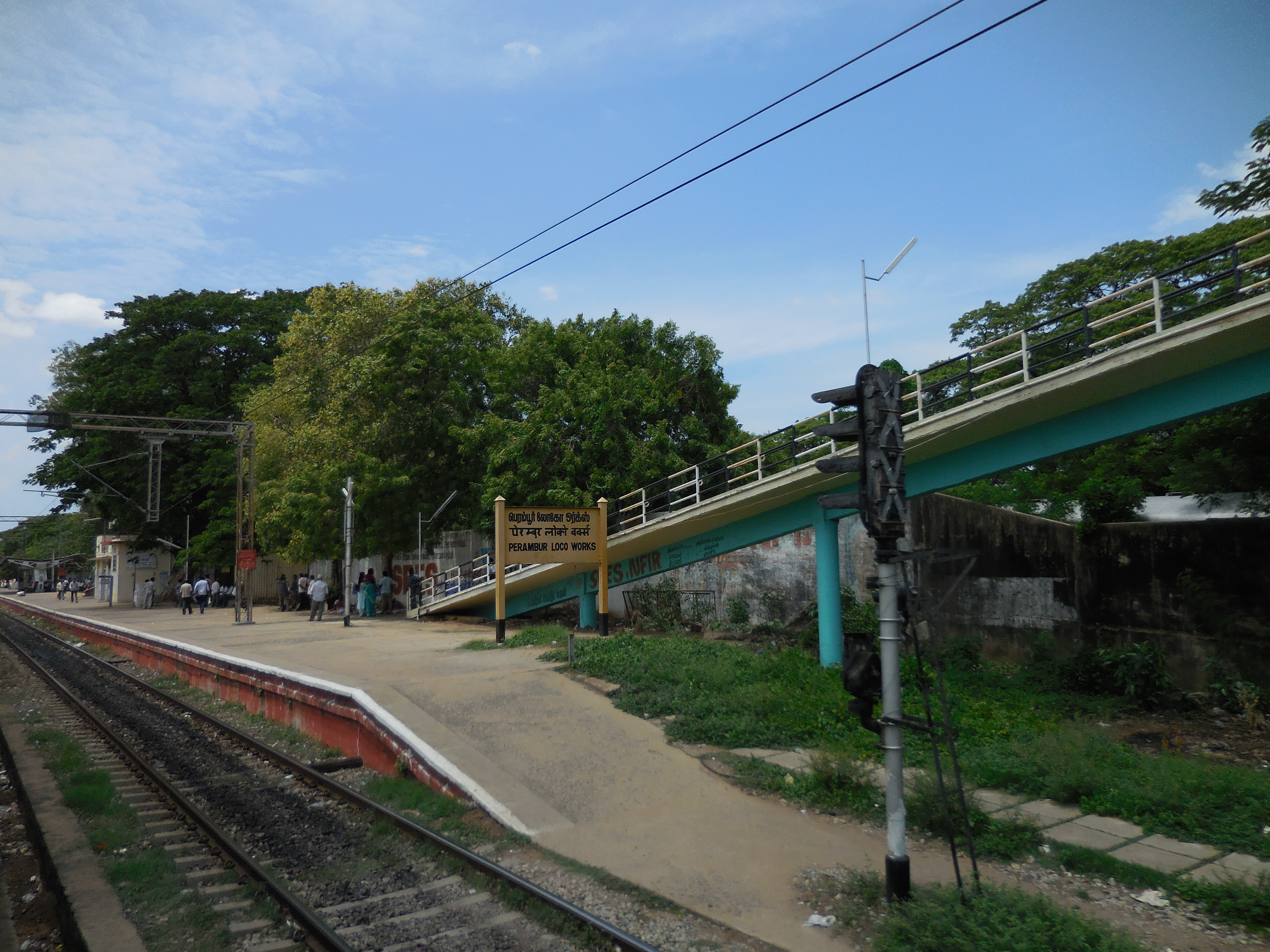
- Perambur Loco Works railway station

General information
- Coordinates: 13.108200°N 80.225700°E
- System: Indian Railways and Chennai Suburban Railway station
- Owner: Ministry of Railways, Indian Railways
- Lines: West, West North and West South lines of Chennai Suburban Railway
- Platforms: 3
- Tracks: 4

Construction
- Structure type: Standard on-ground station
- Parking: Available

Other information
- Station code: PEW
- Fare zone: Southern Railways

History
- Electrified: 29 November 1979
- Former names: Madras and Southern Mahratta Railway

Services
Preceding station	Chennai Suburban	Following station
Villivakkam towards Arakkonam Junction	West Line	Perambur Carriage Works towards Chennai Central MMC
Route map
Chennai Central MMC — Jolarpet
Location

Perambur Loco Works is a suburban railway station in the Perambur area of the city of Chennai, in Tamil Nadu, in India. It serves the Integral Coach Factory (ICF) that is one of the largest railroad carriage and locomotive manufacturers in the world. The station serves growing areas like Periyar Nagar and Jawahar Nagar localities in the north-west corner of Chennai. The station has an elevation of 7.01 m above sea level.

== History ==
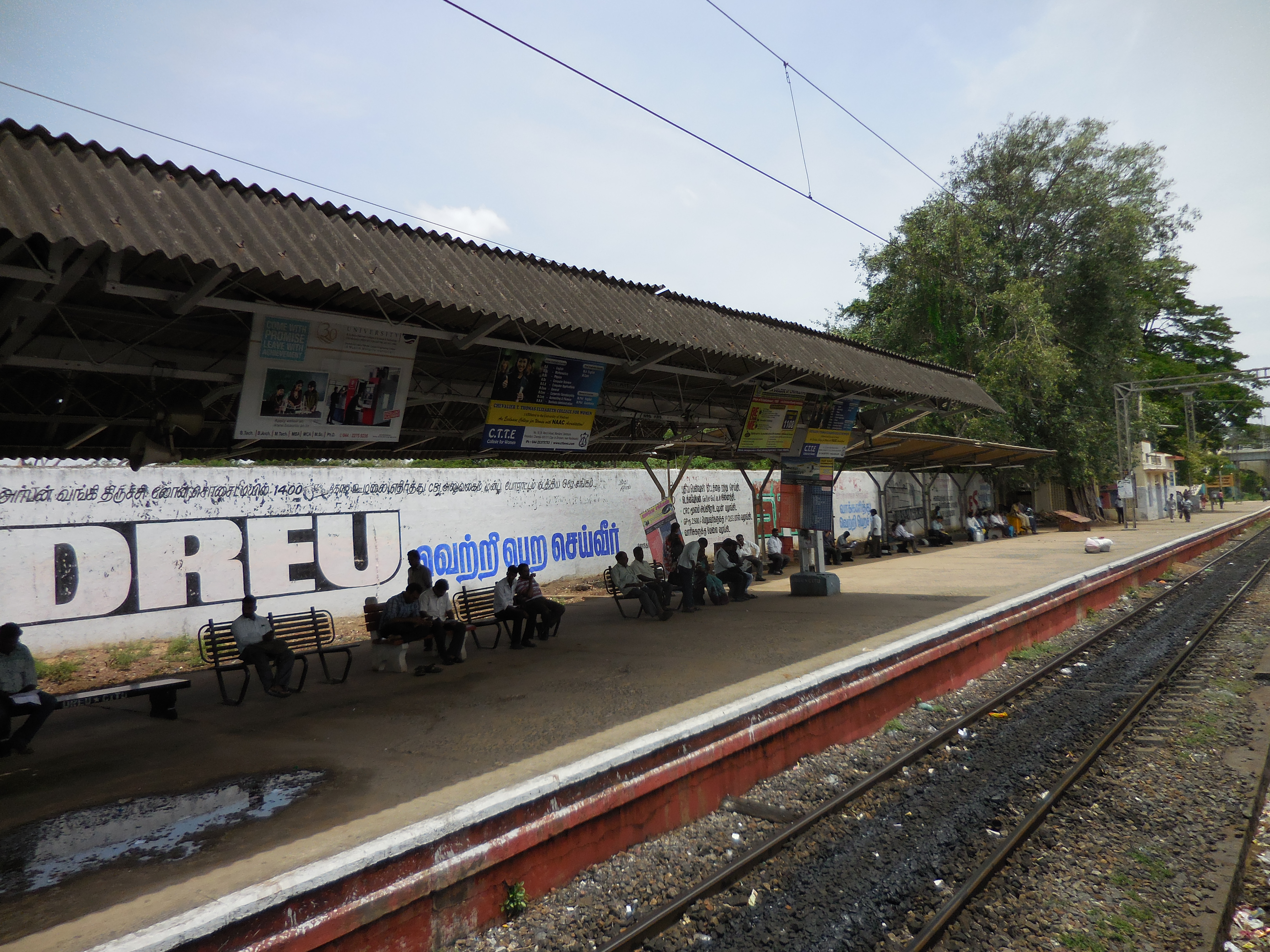
View of the station towards west

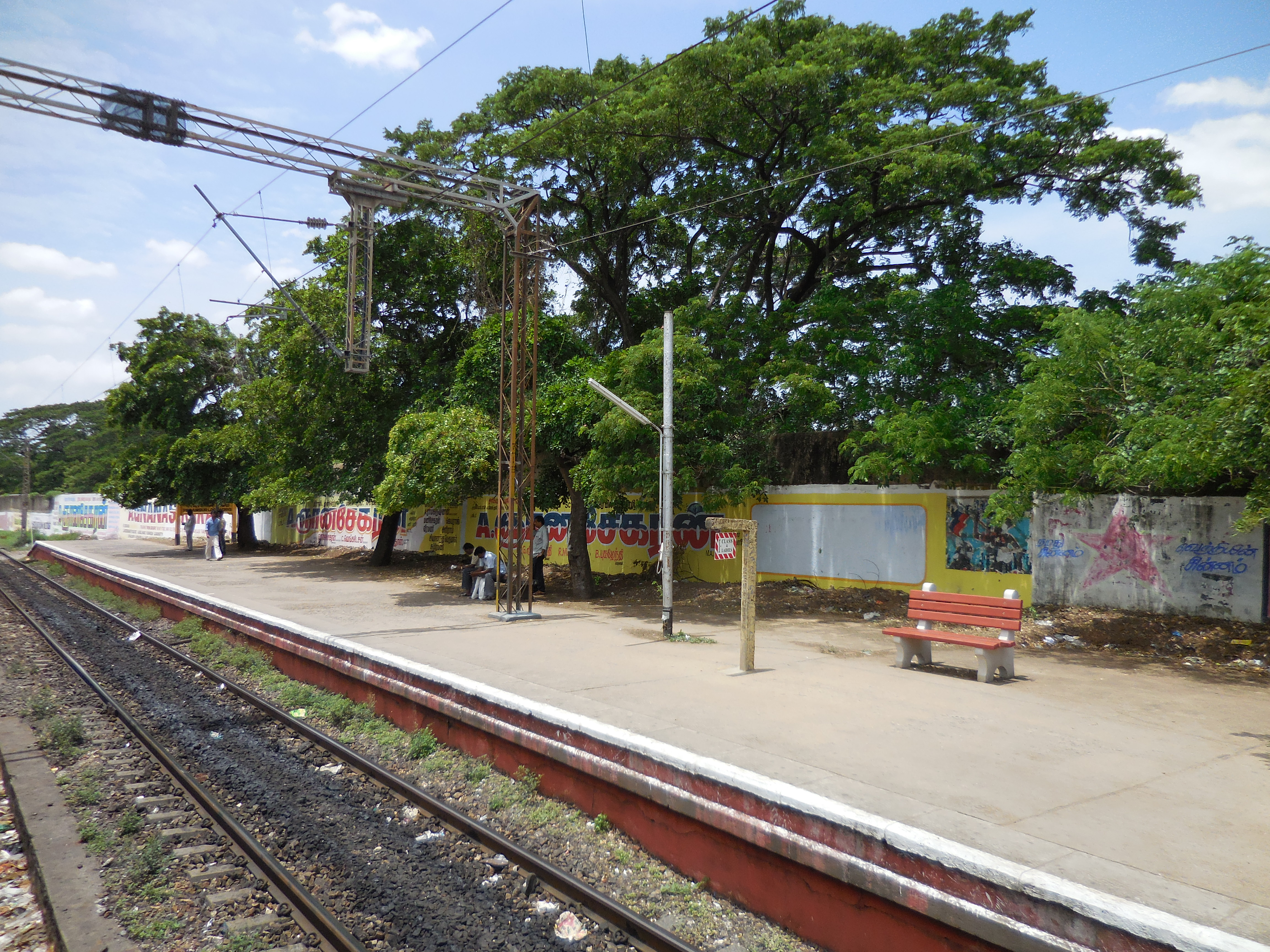
View of the station towards east

Perambur Loco Works is one of the three railway workshops serving Indian Railways' Southern Railway zone (the other two being the Perambur Carriage Works in Chennai and the Golden Rock Railway Workshop at Tiruchi). The Perambur region has been a part of the Chennai city since the middle of the 18th century. The Southern Railway's workshop located here was established in the year 1856 to serve the erstwhile Madras and Southern Mahratta (M&SM) Railway Company and was one of the first major industrial units of the early-20th-century Madras. It was a combined locomotive, carriage and wagon POH, and coach-building workshop and was later bifurcated, in 1932, to deal with carriage and wagon POH activity only, shifting the locomotive overhaul activity to the new Loco workshop which was built adjacent to the original workshop. These two workshops are served by Perambur Carriage Works and Perambur Loco Works stations, respectively. In 1951, the Southern Railway was formed by integrating the erstwhile South Indian Railway Company (Madras), the Southern Mahratta Railway Company, and Mysore State Railway with all their workshops and assets. The project 'subway to the platforms' was completed in mid-2019.

The lines at the station were electrified on 29 November 1979, with the electrification of the Chennai Central–Tiruvallur section.

== See also ==
- Chennai Suburban Railway
- Integral Coach Factory
- Regional Railway Museum
- Railway stations in Chennai
