= Internal Fire Museum of Power =

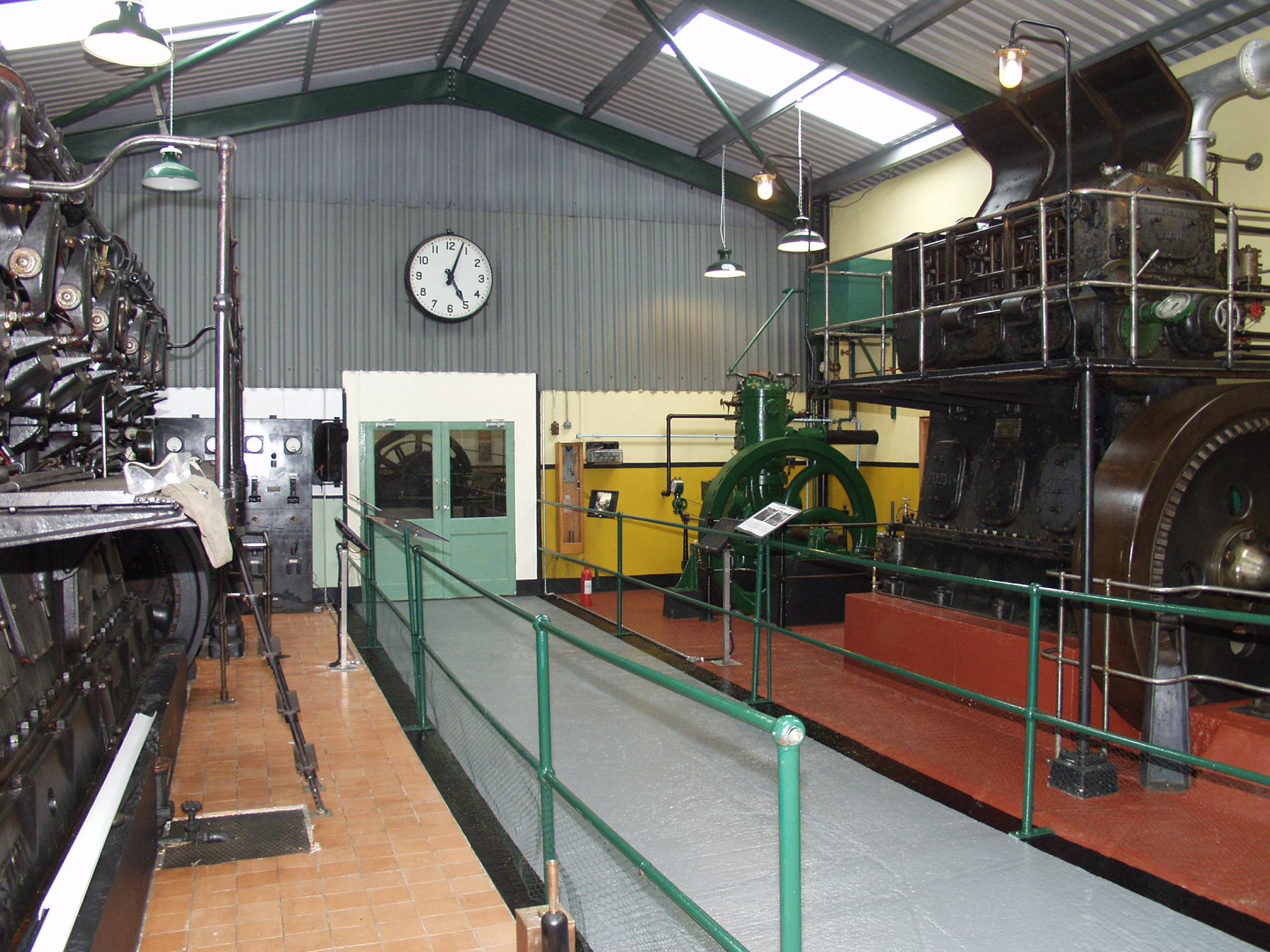
- View into Hall 1

- Location within Ceredigion
- Location: Tan-y-groes, Ceredigion, Wales
- Coordinates: 52.11987°N 4.49122°W
- Type: Technology museum
- Website: Internal Fire – Museum of Power

The Internal Fire Museum of Power is a museum of internal combustion engines in West Wales. The museum's collection is mostly of larger stationary diesel engines, as used for generating sets and pumping stations. The museum is located at Tan-y-groes, Ceredigion, near Cardigan.

== Exhibits ==
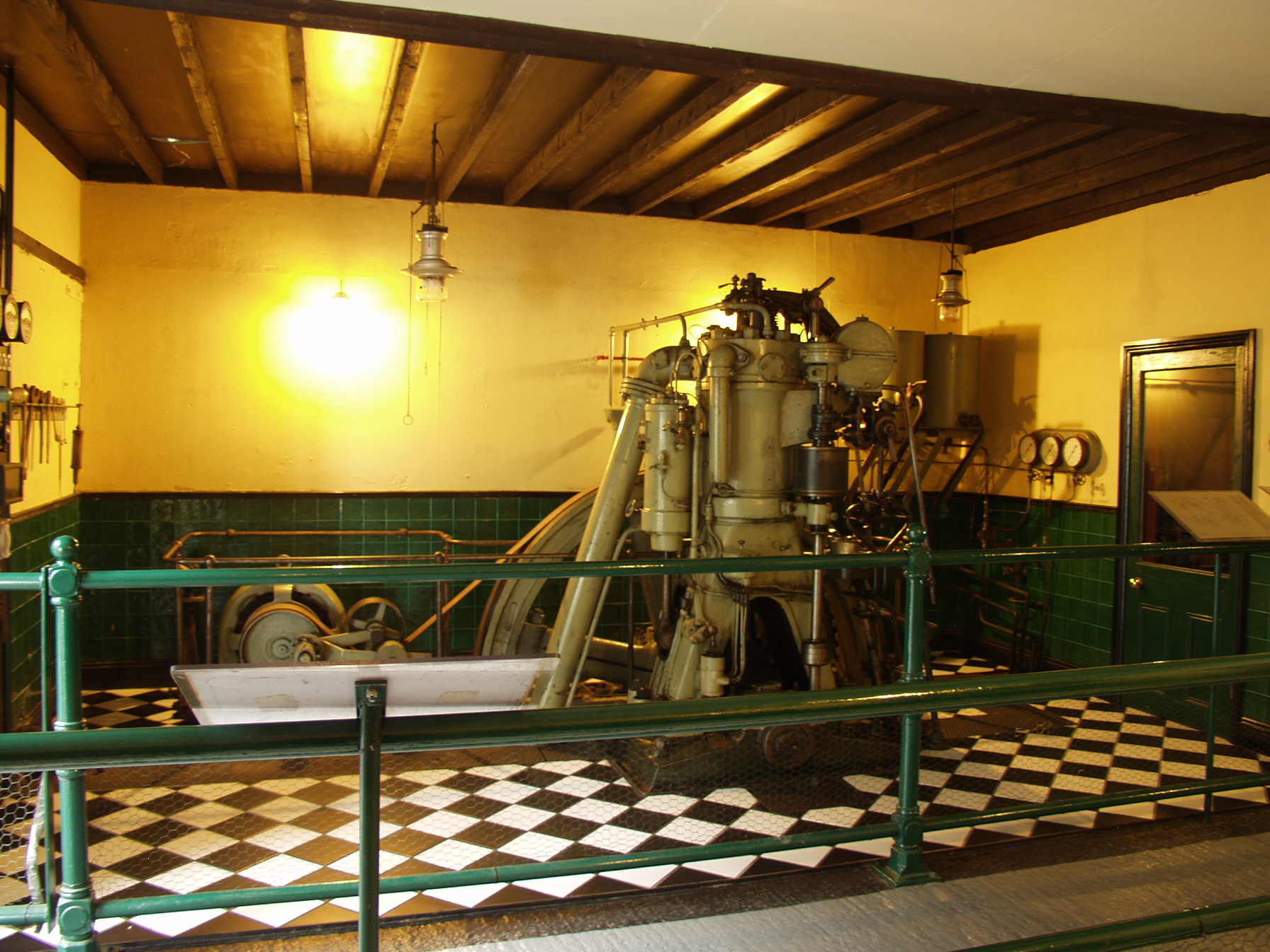
Sulzer 1D25 Air-blast injection Diesel

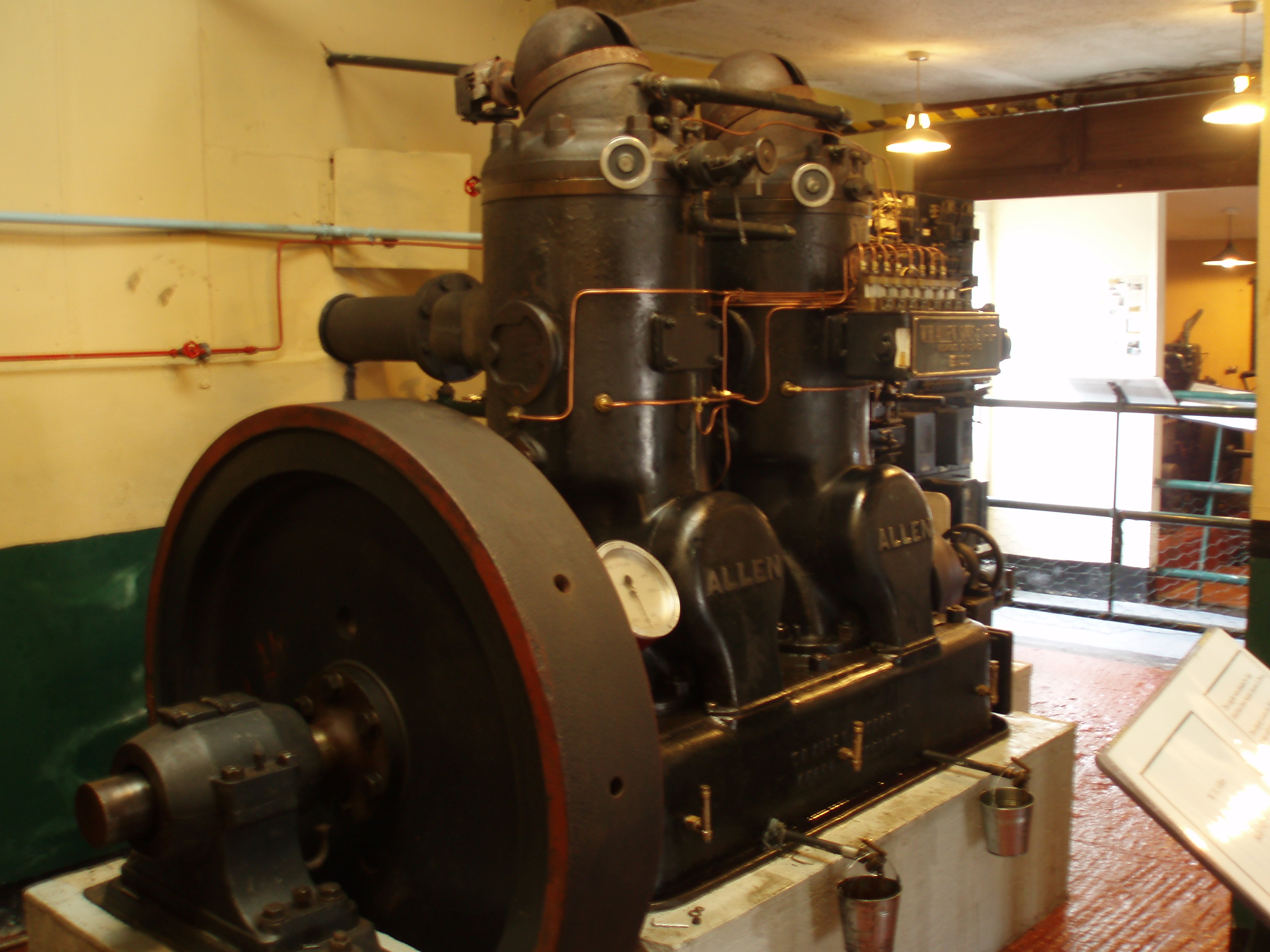
Allen straight-two hot bulb engine

Most of the engines have been restored to working order. Several engines are in operation when the museum is open.

=== Diesel ===
The museum has the oldest working diesel engine in the UK, a 1912 Sulzer single cylinder air-blast injection Diesel, an example of the original Rudolf Diesel design.

=== Steam ===
The museum houses over 200 tons of working engines in nine halls and in 2020 was in the process of creating a new steam hall to house a 1903, J & E Wood, 500 hp tandem compound along with an 1879, John Penn, twin cylinder oscillating paddle steamer (ex Empress) as well as a number of smaller engines including the only surviving Petter steam engine.

In 2017, the museum's second Engineering Heritage Award exhibit (Note: After the Pocket Power Station) arrived. A 1901, 140 bhp three cylinder Willans engine generating set had been used until 1957 at the Maples furniture shop in London. On retirement this had been placed on display at the original Willans factory in Rugby

=== Gas turbine ===
One of the museum's most unusual exhibits was a 'Pocket Power Station', powered by a Bristol Proteus gas turbine engine. The regional electricity board installed several 2.7MW, remote-operated, generation sets for peak load powered by the Proteus. Designed to run for ten years many were still in use forty years later. In 2010 this was recognised with an Engineering Heritage Award.

== See also ==
- Anson Engine Museum
- Prickwillow Museum
- Museum of Power, in the former Southend Waterworks, Essex
