= LMS Sentinel 7164 =

LMS 7164
Type and origin
- Power type: Steam
- Designer: Sentinel Waggon Works; Diagram 52
- Builder: Sentinel Waggon Works
- Build date: 1931
Specifications
- Configuration
  - Whyte: 0-4-0 geared tank
  - UIC: B n2t
- Gauge: 4 ft 8 1/2 in (1,435 mm)
- Driver dia.: 2 ft 6 in (0.762 m)
- Wheelbase: 4 ft 9 in (1.45 m)
- Length: 17 ft 8 3/4 in (5.40 m)
- Loco weight: 19 t (18.7 long tons; 20.9 short tons)
- Fuel type: Coal
- Fuel capacity: 5 long cwt (560 lb; 250 kg)
- Water cap.: 340 imp gal (1,500 L; 410 US gal)
- Boiler pressure: 230 lbf/in^{2} (1.59 MPa)
- Cylinders: Two, inside
- Cylinder size: 6 3/4 in × 9 in (171 mm × 229 mm)
Career
- Operators: London, Midland and Scottish Railway; British Railways
- Numbers: LMS: 7164, later 7184; BR: 47184
- Withdrawn: 1955
- Disposition: Scrapped

The London, Midland and Scottish Railway (LMS) Sentinel No. 7164, (later 7184 and under British Railways, 47184) was a small shunting locomotive. Its design was that of the single-speed Sentinel, a vertical-boilered geared locomotive, using Sentinel's standard vertical boiler and steam motor design. This was the smallest of the four Sentinel classes used by the LMS.

== Design ==
7164 was the LMS' only example of the early Sentinel BE or 'Balanced Engine' design, rather than the later CE or 'Central Engine' design used for 7160–7163. This placed the boiler and engine at opposite ends of the frames, with the water tank in the centre. Although the LNER Class Y1 Sentinel was also a single-speed, they were of the larger Central Engine design and were similar to the two-speed locomotives in appearance.

== Service ==
Built in 1931 by Sentinel Waggon Works as Works No. 8593, it was taken into LMS stock in 1932 as 7164. It was to a design that was also built for use industry, but unique within the LMS, though the LMS did have other Sentinels of different types. The LMS gave it the power classification 0F. It was renumbered 7184 in 1939 and as 47184 after nationalisation in 1948. 47184 was withdrawn in 1955 from 5B Crewe Works and subsequently scrapped.

== Other LMS Sentinel classes ==
- 7160-7163, two-speed Sentinels
- 7164
- 7190–7191, the S&DJR 'Radstock' Sentinels
- 7192, the Abner Doble-designed four-cylinder compound

== Preservation ==
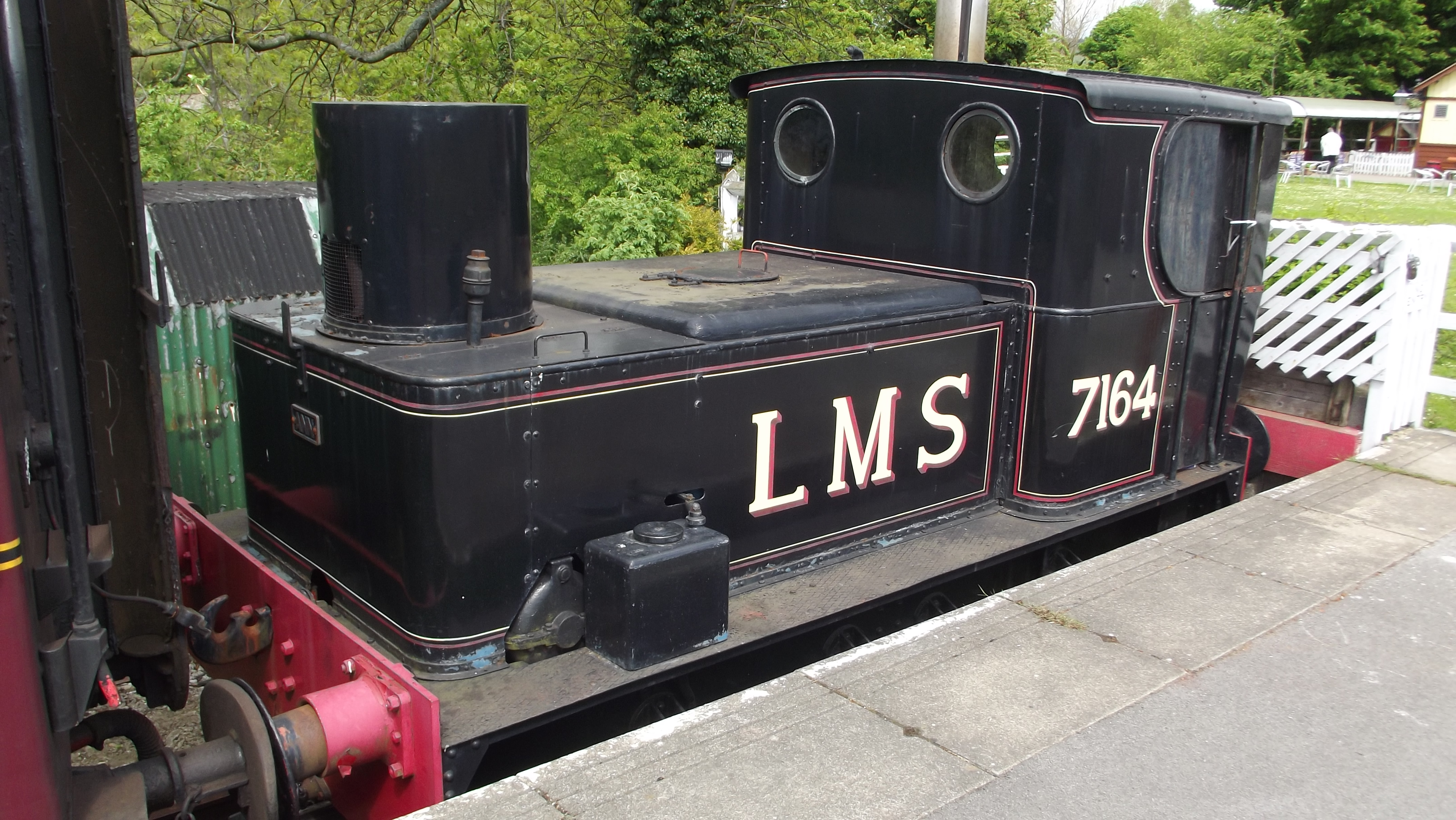
The replica '7164' at Bolton Abbey station

47184 was not preserved. However, similar Sentinel locomotive No. 7232 Ann was painted as 7164 on the Embsay and Bolton Abbey Steam Railway in 2003. The prototype only carried unlined black livery but Ann was given lined black livery and retained her nameplate.
