= GSR Class 280 =

Class of 2 Irish 0-4-0VBT locomotives

GSR 280 Class
Type and origin
- Power type: Steam
- Builder: Sentinel Waggon Works
- Build date: 1927
- Total produced: 2
Specifications
- Configuration
  - Whyte: 0-4-0T
- Gauge: 5 ft 3 in (1,600 mm)
- Driver dia.: 2 ft 6 in (760 mm)
- Length: 21 ft 1 1/4 in (6,433 mm)
- Loco weight: 20.25 long tons (20.57 t)
Career
- Operators: Great Southern Railways (GSR)
- Class: M1 (Inchicore)
- Power class: TT
- Number in class: 2
- Locale: Ireland
- Withdrawn: 1948

The Great Southern Railways (GSR) Class 280 were 0-4-0T locomotives built by Sentinel in 1927.

== Design ==
The design consisted of a vertical boiler inside the cab surrounded by the coal bunker and water tanks and the cylinders mounted vertically between the axles. The design was similar to others Sentinel has provided to other companies. The LNER Class Y3 and GWR No. 12 are examples of a broadly similar design.

== Service ==
The locomotive design had a low cost operating cost and suited to shunting and tight radius curve. Initially allocated to Cork and Tralee by 1932 both had moved to Limerick and worked the market siding. Following the closure of the market siding in 1940 they lay idle until disposal in 1940.

== Railcars ==
A similar power unit was also used in four GSR Railcars introduced in 1932.
