= Y1 class =

Y1 class or Class Y1 may refer to:

- Y1-class Melbourne tram
- LNER Class Y1, 0-4-0 geared steam locomotives
