= 1150 class =

1150 class or Class 1150 may refer to:

- CP Class 1150, diesel-hydraulic locomotives
- Queensland Railways 1150 class, diesel-electric locomotives
