= LNER Class Y10 =

Class of English steam locomotive

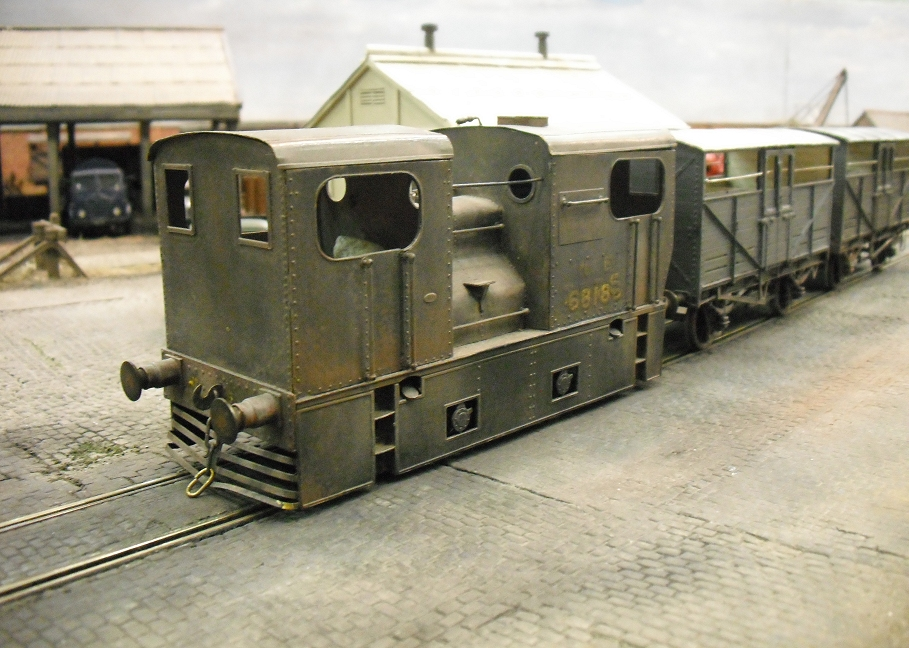
- Model of a Y10
Type and origin
- Power type: Steam
- Designer: Sentinel Waggon Works
- Builder: Sentinel Waggon Works
- Build date: 1930
- Total produced: 2 (for LNER)
Specifications
- Configuration
  - Whyte: 0-4-0T
- Gauge: 4 ft 8 1/2 in (1,435 mm)
- Driver dia.: 3 ft 2 in (0.965 m)
- Wheelbase: 6 ft 0 in (1.83 m)
- Length: 23 ft 2 1/4 in (7.07 m) over buffers
- Axle load: 12.3 long tons (12.5 t; 13.8 short tons)
- Loco weight: 23.95 long tons (24.33 t; 26.82 short tons)
- Fuel type: Coal
- Fuel capacity: 12 long hundredweight (610 kg; 1,300 lb)
- Water cap.: 600 imp gal (2,700 L; 720 US gal)
- Firebox
  - Grate area: 6.5 sq ft (0.60 m^{2})
- Boiler pressure: 275 psi (1.90 MPa) water tube boiler
- Heating surface
  - Firebox: 51 sq ft (4.7 m^{2})
  - Total surface: 159 sq ft (14.8 m^{2})
- Superheater
  - Heating area: 40.0 sq ft (3.72 m^{2})
- Cylinders: Four
- Cylinder size: 6 3/4 in × 9 in (171 mm × 229 mm)
- Valve type: Rotary cam & poppet valves
Performance figures
- Tractive effort: see text
Career
- Operators: London and North Eastern Railway; → British Railways
- Axle load class: RA 1
- Withdrawn: 1948, 1952
- Disposition: Both scrapped

The LNER Class Y10 was a class of two 0-4-0T geared steam locomotives built by Sentinel Waggon Works for the London and North Eastern Railway and introduced in 1930. The LNER numbered them 8403 and 8404 but they were later re-numbered 8186 and 8187. This was the second use of the classification Y10 by the LNER. The first was for an ex-North British Railway 0-4-0 steam tender locomotive, withdrawn 1925.

Both the Sentinels passed into British Railways ownership in 1948 but 8187 was withdrawn almost immediately. Number 8186 was allocated the BR number 68186, but never actually carried it, and was withdrawn in 1952.

== Power unit ==
The superheated vertical water-tube boiler and the motor were similar to those used in Sentinel steam wagons. Each locomotive had two 2-cylinder engines, giving a total of 200 horsepower (150 kW). The engines had poppet valves and reversing was by sliding camshaft. The advantage of the water-tube boiler was that steam could be raised much more quickly than with a conventional fire-tube boiler.

== Transmission ==
Final drive to the wheels was by sprocket and chain. There was a two-speed gearbox but gears could only be changed while the locomotive was stationary. Tractive effort was:

- Low gear 11,435 lbf (50.87 kN)
- High gear 7,965 lbf (35.43 kN)

== Usage ==
These locomotives were intended for service on the Wisbech and Upwell Tramway and had several tram engine features. These included cowcatchers and sideplates and a cab at each end, similar to the GER Class C53 locomotives which already worked on the line.

They were not a great success on the Wisbech and Upwell and both were moved to Yarmouth in May 1931 to work the quayside line.
