= LNER Class Y3 =

Class of 0-4-0T locomotives

Type and origin
- Power type: Steam
- Designer: Sentinel Waggon Works
- Builder: Sentinel Waggon Works
- Build date: 1927-1931
- Total produced: 32
Specifications
- Configuration
  - Whyte: 0-4-0 geared tank
- Gauge: 4 ft 8 1/2 in (1,435 mm)
- Driver dia.: 2 ft 6 in (0.76 m)
- Loco weight: 20.8 long tons (21.1 t)
- Fuel type: coal
- Boiler pressure: 275 psi (1.90 MPa) water tube boiler
- Cylinders: two
- Cylinder size: 6 3/4 in × 9 in (170 mm × 230 mm)
Performance figures
- Tractive effort: see text
Career
- Axle load class: Route Availability 1

The LNER Class Y3 was a class of 0-4-0 geared steam locomotives built by Sentinel Waggon Works for the London and North Eastern Railway and introduced in 1927. They passed into British Railways ownership in 1948 and were numbered 68154-68185. At least one was based at Immingham in 1950.

== Power unit ==
The superheated vertical water-tube boiler and the engine were similar to those used in Sentinel steam wagons. The engines had poppet valves and reversing was by sliding camshaft. The advantage of the water-tube boiler was that steam could be raised much more quickly than with a conventional fire-tube boiler.

== Transmission ==
Final drive to the wheels was by sprocket chain. Some locomotives had a sprocket gear ratio of 19:19 and others 15:19. In addition, there was a two-speed gearbox but gears could only be changed while the locomotive was stationary. Tractive effort was:

- Ratio 19:19, Low gear 12,600 lbf (56 kN), High gear 4,705 lbf (20.93 kN) (68154-68179 and 68184-68185)
- Ratio 15:19, Low gear 15,960 lbf (71.0 kN), High gear 5,960 lbf (26.5 kN) (68180-68183)
