= LMS Sentinel 7192 =

LMS 7192
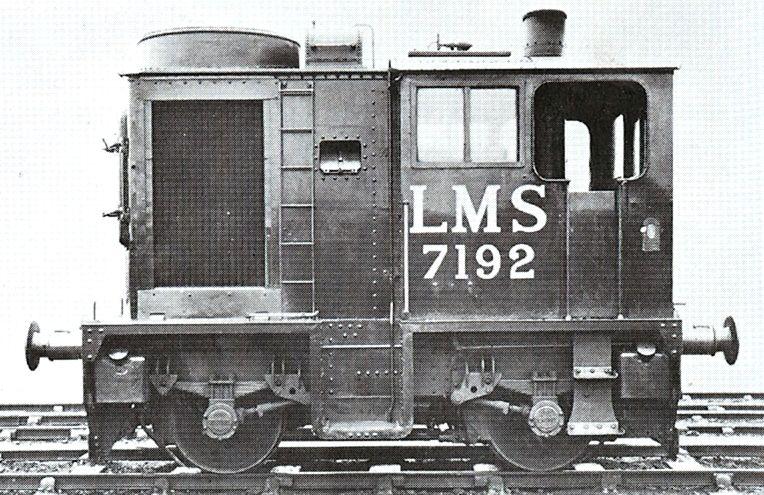
- 7192 in 1934
Type and origin
- Power type: Steam (geared)
- Builder: Sentinel Waggon Works, Shrewsbury
- Order number: LMS Lot 111
- Serial number: 8805
- Build date: 1934
Specifications
- Configuration
  - Whyte: 0-4-0T
  - UIC: B n4vt
- Gauge: 4 ft 8 1/2 in (1,435 mm) standard gauge
- Driver dia.: 3 ft 1 in (0.940 m)
- Wheelbase: 8 ft 6 in (2.59 m)
- Length: 18 ft 4 1/2 in (5.60 m)
- Loco weight: 20.40 long tons (20.73 t; 22.85 short tons)
- Cylinders: Four: two high pressure, two low pressure
- High-pressure cylinder: 4 1/4 in × 6 in (108 mm × 152 mm)
- Low-pressure cylinder: 7 1/4 in × 6 in (184 mm × 152 mm)
Career
- Operators: London, Midland and Scottish Railway
- Numbers: 7192
- Withdrawn: 1943
- Disposition: Scrapped

The London, Midland and Scottish Railway (LMS) Sentinel No. 7192 was a geared steam locomotive. It was built in 1934 by the Sentinel Waggon Works of Shrewsbury, maker's number 8805 on LMS Lot 111. It had an Abner Doble boiler combined with a 4-cylinder compound arrangement, but an order for an additional locomotive and three railcars to a similar design was later cancelled. It was withdrawn in 1943 and scrapped.
