= S&DJR Sentinels =

Steam locomotive for shunting

Type and origin
- Power type: Steam (geared)
- Builder: Sentinel Waggon Works
- Serial number: 7587–7588
- Model: 200 hp industrial
- Build date: 1929
Specifications
- Configuration
  - Whyte: 0-4-0VBT
  - UIC: B n4t
- Gauge: 4 ft 8 1/2 in (1,435 mm) standard gauge
- Loco weight: 27 long tons 15 cwt (62,200 lb or 28.2 t)
- Fuel type: Coal
- Boiler pressure: 275 lb/in^{2} (1.90 MPa)
- Cylinders: Four
- Cylinder size: 6 3/4 in × 9 in (171 mm × 229 mm)
- Valve type: Poppet valves
Performance figures
- Power output: 200 hp (150 kW)
- Tractive effort: 15,500 lbf (68.9 kN)
Career
- Operators: Somerset and Dorset Joint Railway; → London Midland and Scottish Railway; → British Railways
- Number in class: 2
- Numbers: S&DJR: 101–102; LMS: 7190–7191; BR 47190–47191
- Withdrawn: 1959, 1961
- Disposition: Both scrapped

The Somerset and Dorset Joint Railway (S&DJR) Sentinel locomotives were two small vertical-boilered, chain-driven steam locomotives for shunting. They were built by Sentinel Waggon Works, who also produced similar designs for industrial customers.

== Service ==
The two locomotives were both built in 1929 and given the S&DJR numbers 101 and 102. The locomotives replaced three older Highbridge-built saddle tanks, 24A, 25A and 45A. They were both used for shunting coal wagons on the colliery branchlines around Radstock. They were built to a reduced loading gauge as they had to pass under the Tyning Arch which had only 10 feet 10 inches (3.30 m) clearance.

They were taken into London, Midland and Scottish Railway (LMS) stock in 1930 and renumbered 7190–7191. After nationalisation in 1948, they became 47190–47191 under British Railways. 47191 was withdrawn in 1959 from Bath Green Park and 47190 in 1961 from Bristol (Barrow Road). Both were scrapped.

== Preservation ==
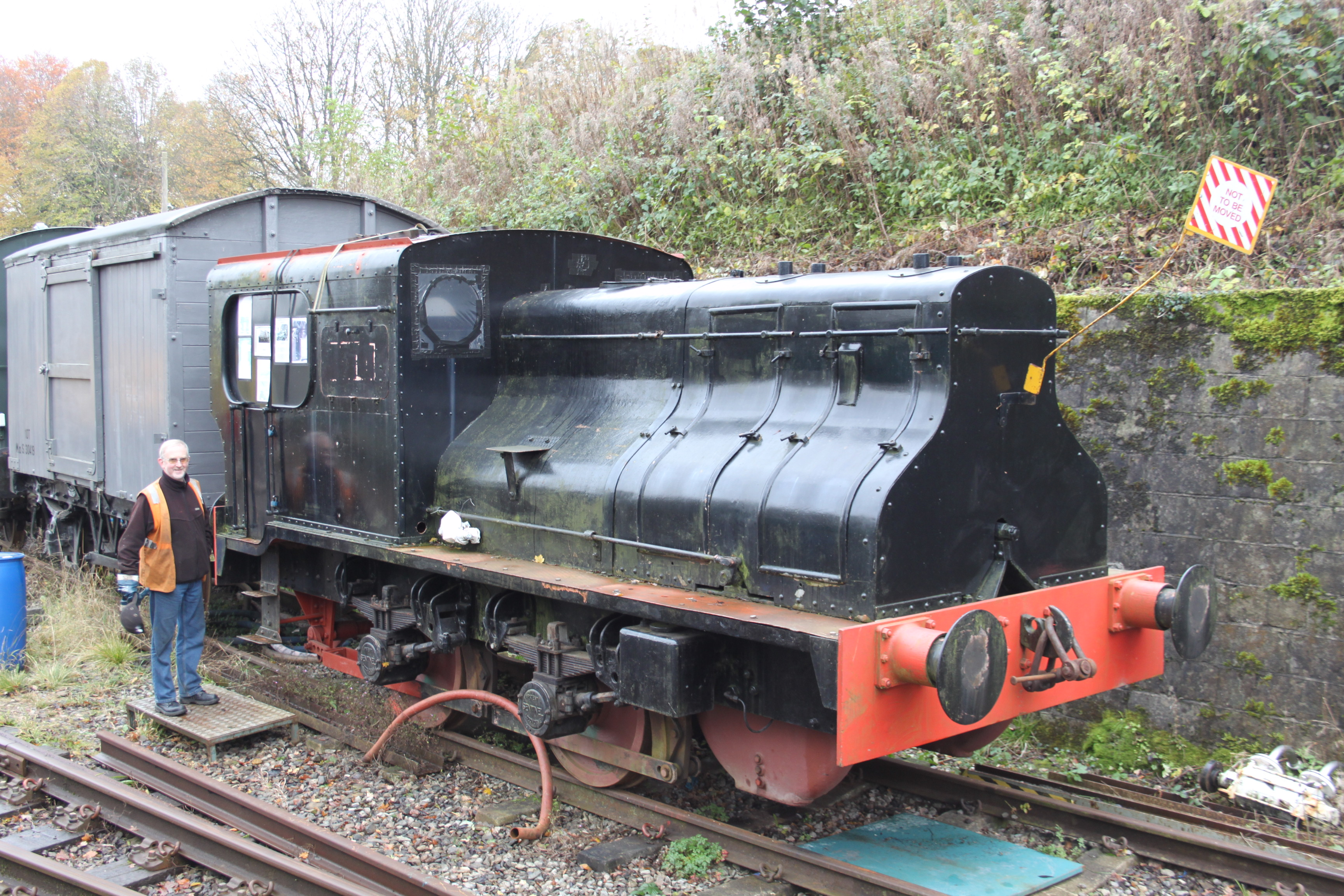
Sentinel Loco 7190 being restored at Midsomer Norton in November 2013

Neither of the Radstock Sentinels survived into preservation. However, a similar locomotive, former Croydon Gasworks No. 37 Joyce (works number 7109), originally built in 1927, is restored and running at the Somerset & Dorset Railway Heritage Trust at Midsomer Norton railway station.
