= Sentinel Waggon Works =

Former British manufacturer of steam vehicles

Coordinates: 52.729°N 2.734°W

Sentinel Waggon Works Ltd
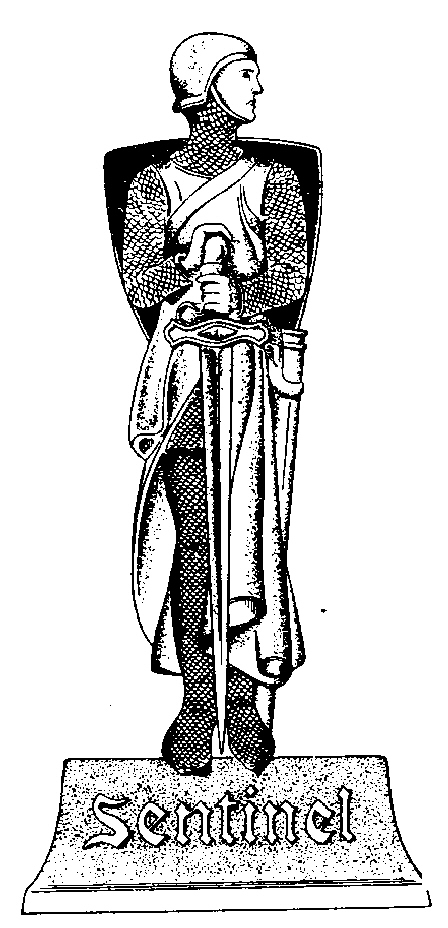
- Trade mark of UK company Alley & MacLellan Ltd, Sentinel brand Jan 1949
- Type: Limited company
- Industry: Engineering
- Predecessor: Alley & MacLellan
- Founded: 1906
- Defunct: 1965 ?
- Fate: Merged into Rolls-Royce Limited
- Successor: Rolls-Royce Limited
- Headquarters: Shrewsbury
- Products: Steam wagons Locomotives; Diesel Lorries

Sentinel Waggon Works Ltd was a British company based in Shrewsbury, Shropshire that made steam-powered lorries (steam wagons), railway locomotives, and later, diesel engined lorries, buses and locomotives.

== History ==
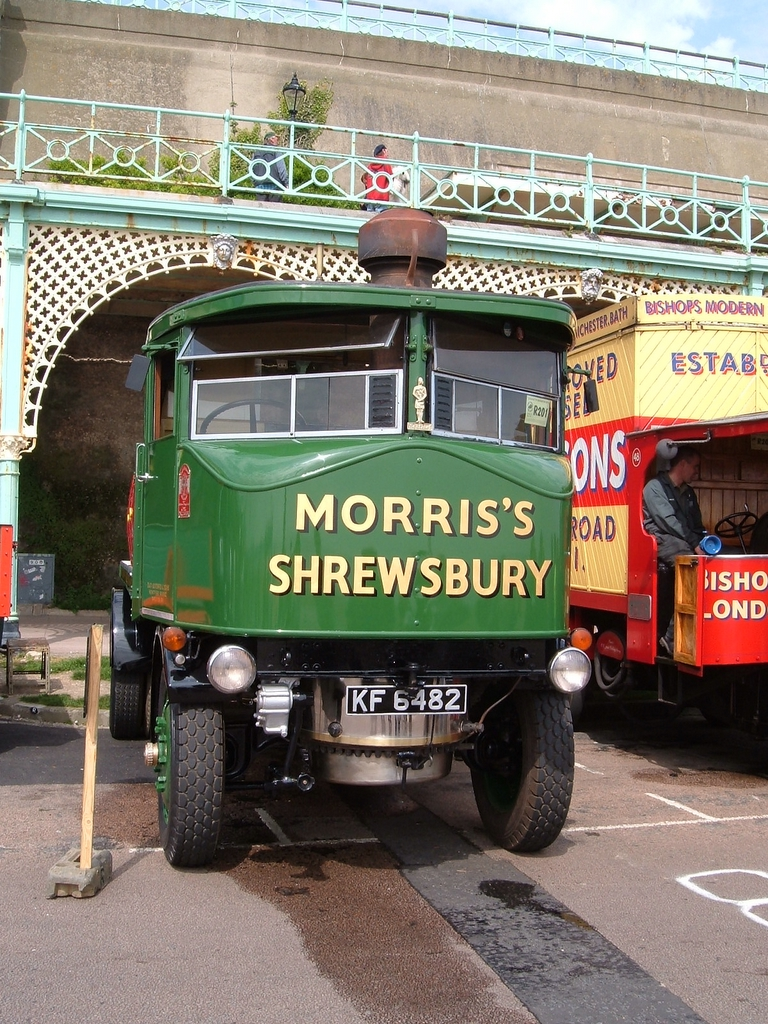
Preserved 1931-built Sentinel DG4

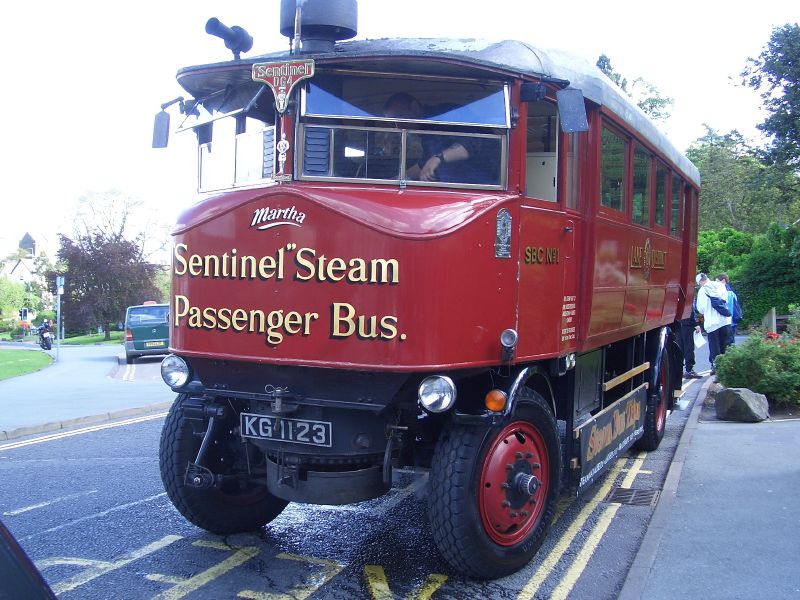
A Sentinel Steam Bus

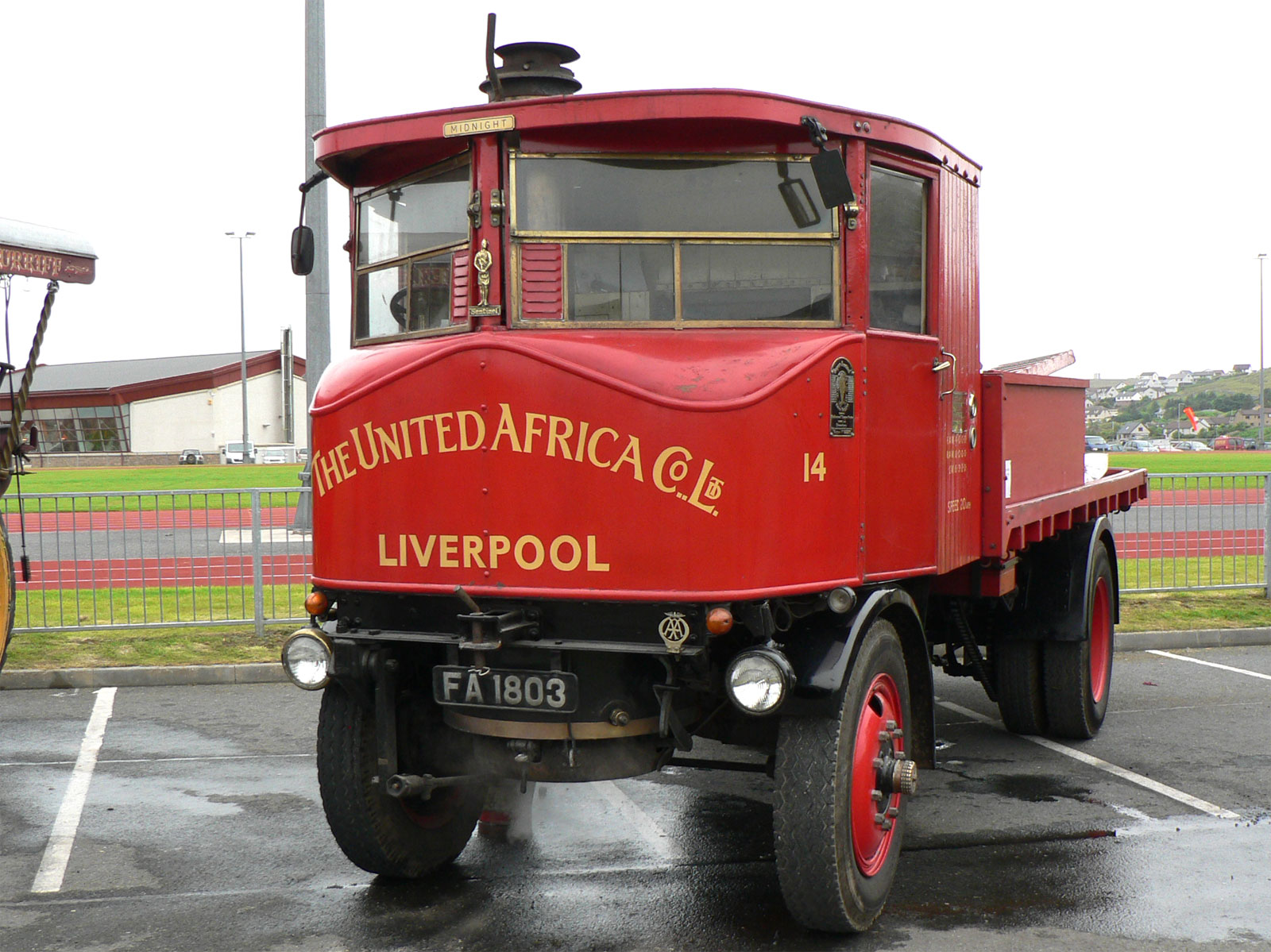
1924 Super Sentinel FA1803

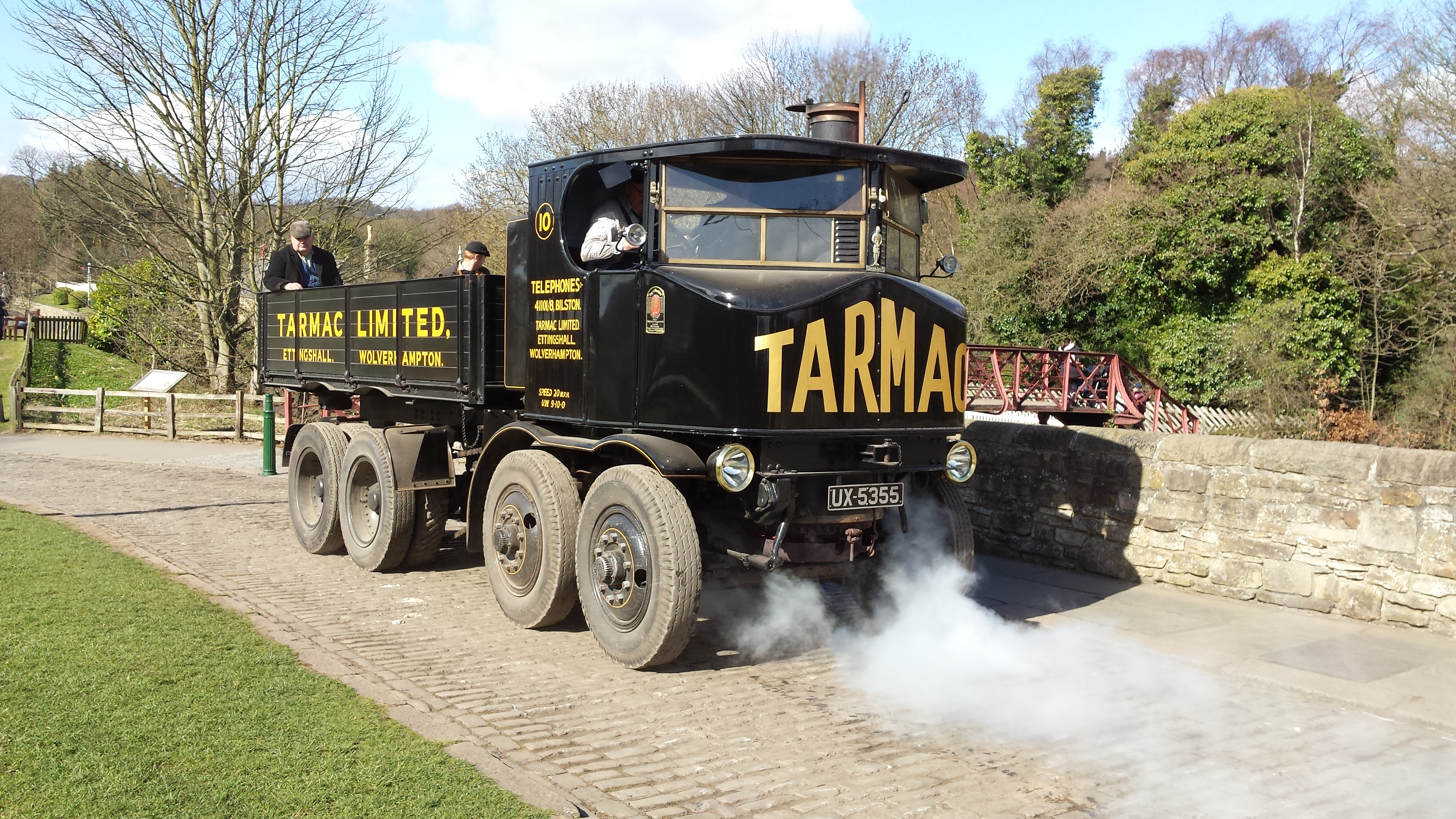
Sentinel DG8, Beamish Steam Fair

=== Alley & MacLellan, Sentinel Works, Jessie Street Glasgow ===
Alley & MacLellan was founded in 1875 and was based in Polmadie, Glasgow. This company continued in operation until the 1950s. Initially manufacturing valves and compressors for steam engines, and later whole steamships, Alley & MacLellan acquired Simpson and Bibby of Horsehay, Shropshire, manufacturer of steam-powered road vehicles, in 1903. They began producing steam road vehicles in 1905 and in 1906 introduced a five-ton vertical-boiler steam wagon, which featured a two-cylinder undertype engine and chain drive.

Around 1915, Alley & McLellan moved the steam wagon production to a new factory in Shrewsbury and it continued under a separate company (see below), and in 1918 the company also opened a third factory in Worcester specialising in valve manufacture. Both factory buildings were prefabricated in Glasgow for local assembly and in both cases core Scottish employees transferred to the new sites.

Alley & MacLellan continued to operate in the original Sentinel Works in Jessie Street, Glasgow until the 1950s. They produced a wide range of engineering products including compressors, valves, etc. The 'Sentinel' name continued to be used for the products of the original Glasgow works until the mid 20th Century.

=== Move to Shrewsbury ===
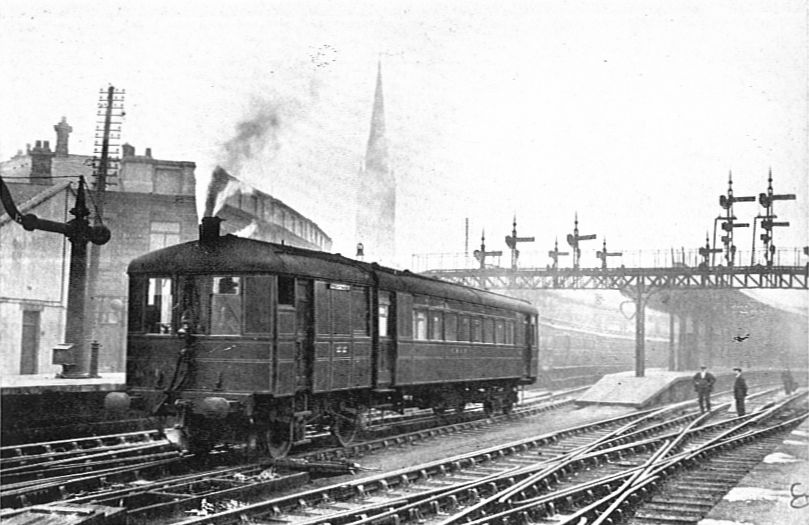
LNER Sentinel-Cammell steam railcar

The company Sentinel Waggon Works Ltd was formed when steam wagon production was switched to a new factory, opened at Shrewsbury in 1915. There were several other slight changes to the name over the company's lifetime when further infusions of working capital were required to obviate financial problems.

Alley & MacLellan's early steam wagon was so successful that it remained in production with relatively few updates until the launch of Sentinel's famous Super in 1923. The company also produced steam railway locomotives and railcars, for railway companies and industrial customers.

In 1917, the company was bought by William Beardmore and Company.

=== Sentinel Waggon Works (1920) Ltd ===
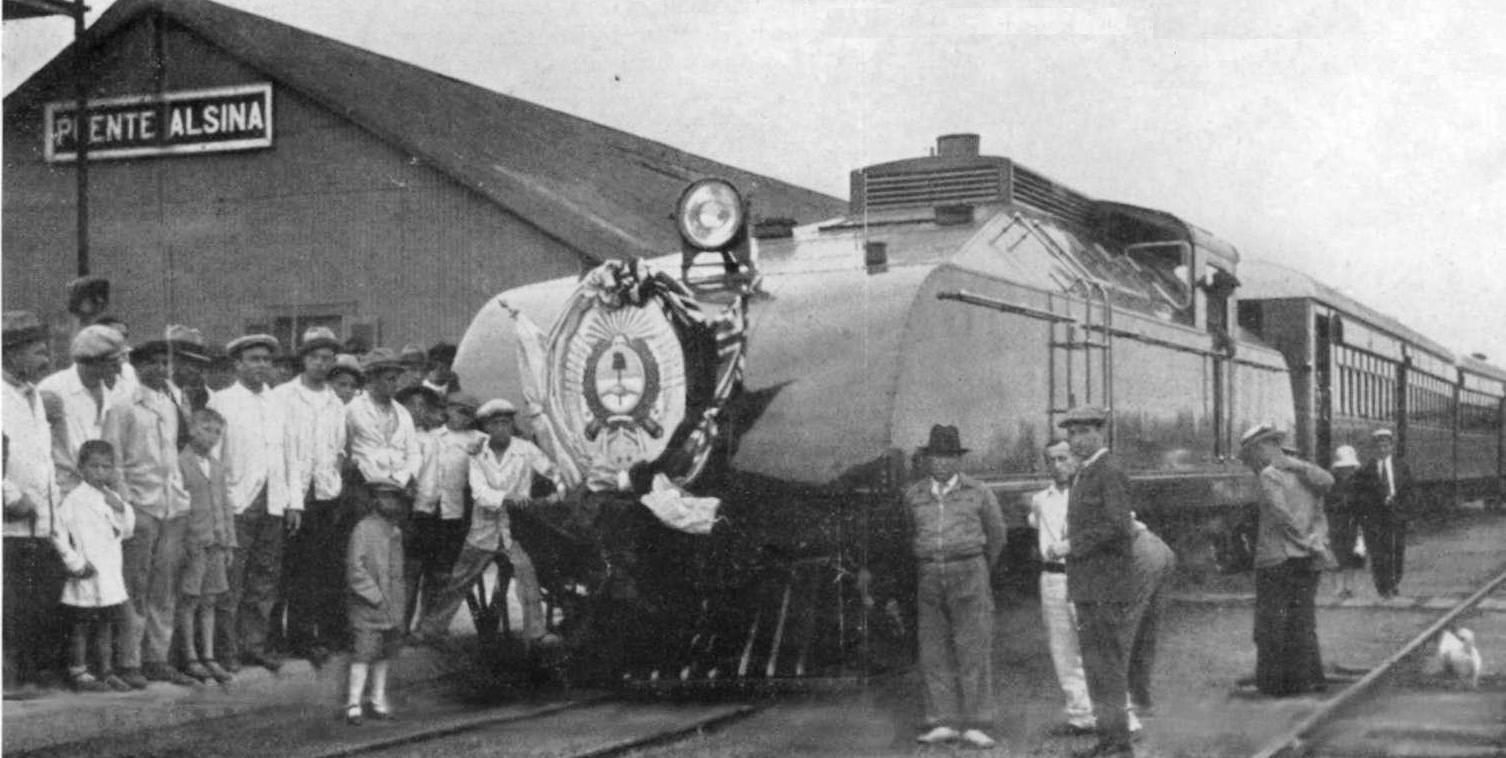
Sentinel locomotive on the Buenos Aires Midland Railway in Argentina (1932)

In 1920, after financial problems, the company was reorganised as Sentinel Waggon Works (1920) Ltd. The Sentinel 'Super' model that followed in 1923 was assembled in a radical new plant at Shrewsbury, with a flow line based on Henry Ford's Model T factory at Highland Park, Michigan, with 1,550 vehicles produced.

Sentinel, along with Foden, dominated the steam market, but the 1930s saw the demise of both companies' ranges as new legislation forced the development of lighter lorries, Sentinel surviving the longest.

In 1934, Sentinel launched a new and advanced steamer – the S type which had a single-acting four-cylinder underfloor engine with longitudinal crankshaft and an overhead worm-drive axle. Their Sentinel Waggon Works' design of 1935 led to the production of 3,750 Sentinel 'Standards' in the seventeen years that followed, the biggest selling steam lorry ever. It was lighter and featured a modernised driver's cab with a set-back boiler and was available in four, six and eight-wheel form, designated S4, S6 and S8. In spite of its sophisticated design, however, it could not compete with contemporary diesel trucks for all-round convenience and payload capacity, and was phased out in the late 1930s. It was not the end of Sentinel's involvement with steam, however; the company built about 100 "S" type vehicles for export to Argentina as late as 1950, for use by the Río Turbio coal mine. It has been stated that Sentinel were never paid for the last batch of the Río Turbio production run. At least two of the Río Turbio steam wagons survive in Argentina to this day.

In 1946, Thomas Hill's signed an agency agreement with Sentinel for repair and maintenance of diesel vehicles. In 1947 Sentinel offered to extend the agreement for diesel vehicles to include the steam locomotives and an agency was accepted by Thomas Hill for sales and servicing.

=== Sentinel (Shrewsbury) Ltd ===
In 1947, the company became Sentinel (Shrewsbury) Ltd, and had developed a new range of diesel lorries. Despite Sentinel's superbly engineered vehicles, sales diminished throughout the 1950s, and by 1956 the company was forced to cease lorry production. The factory was acquired by Rolls-Royce for diesel engine production, and the remaining stock of parts and vehicles was taken over by Sentinel's chief dealer, North Cheshire Motors of Warrington, who formed a new company, Transport Vehicles (Warrington) Ltd, in 1957 to produce Sentinel-based designs under the TVW name.

In 1963, Thomas Hill's decided to renew the loco agreement and relinquish the diesel vehicle agency, concentrating all efforts on the steam locomotive work.

=== Rolls-Royce agree to build diesel locomotives ===
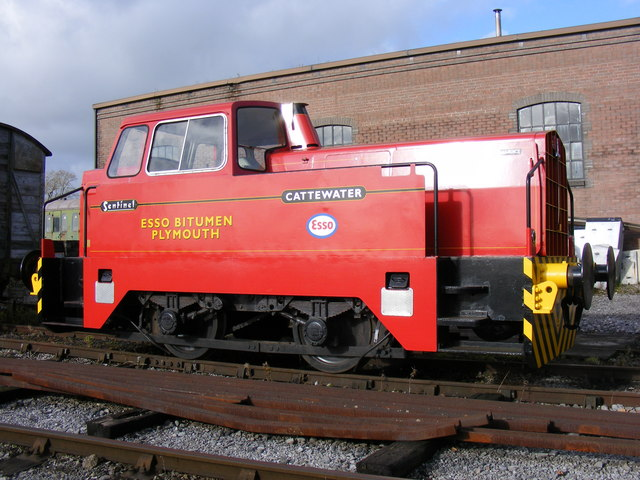
Rolls-Royce Sentinel Cattewater, now at the East Somerset Railway

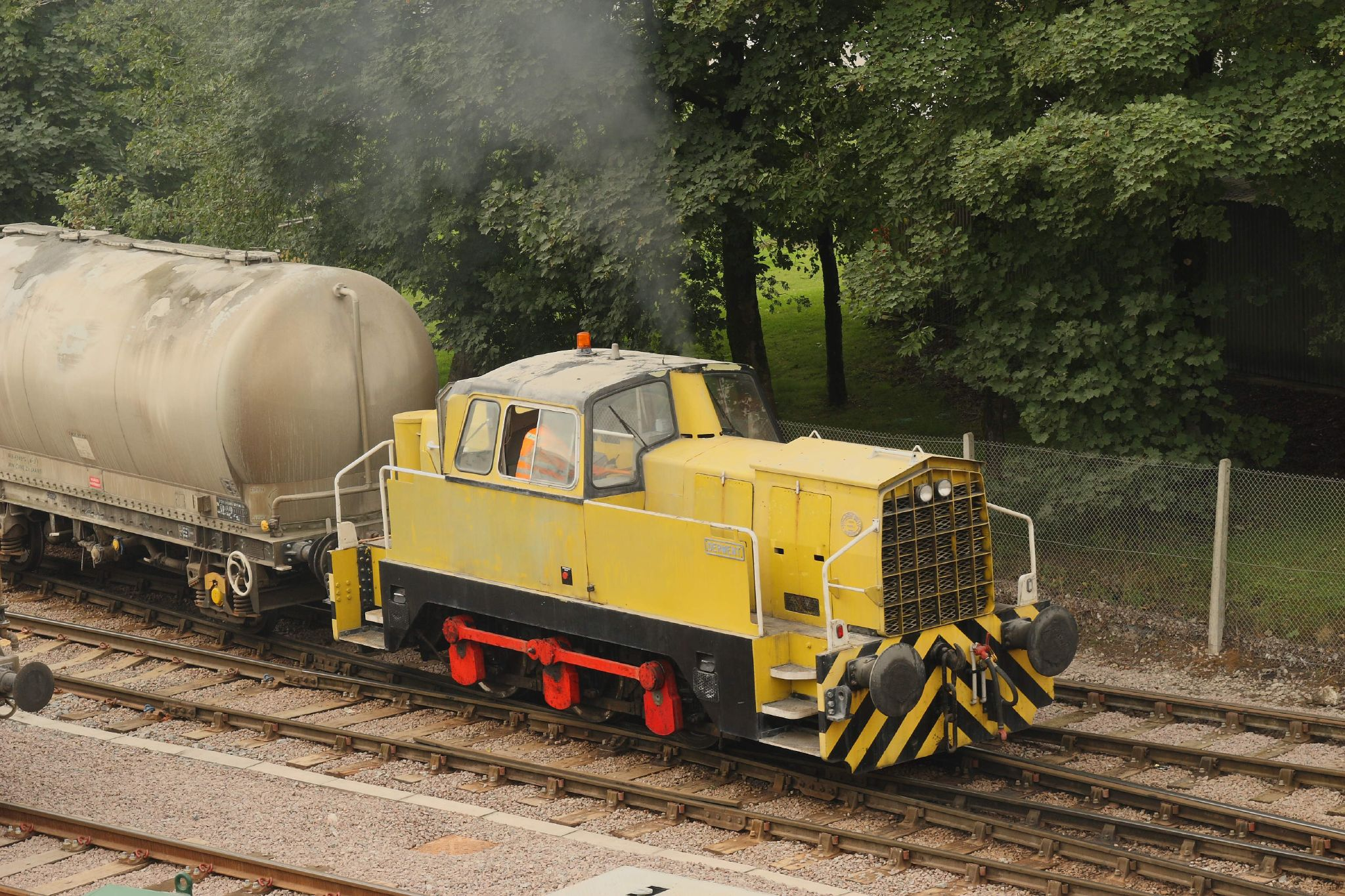
An 0-6-0 outside-crank Sentinel Derwent at Lafarge Hope Cement Works in 2008

Despite the various interesting developments, Rolls-Royce did not consider railway locomotives to be part of their core business. They had agreed to complete all steam locos on order, and four steam receiver locos ordered by Dorman Long in 1956, but only after much consideration did Rolls-Royce finally agree at the end of 1957 to design and build a diesel locomotive of similar weight and power to the 200 hp (150 kW) steam loco that had sold so well. Thomas Hill's would assist in the design and development of these diesel machines and would be the sole distributor.

=== Last steam locomotives ===
In 1958, the last two Sentinel steam locomotives were delivered, marking the end of an era. Two of the newly developed steam receiver locos were delivered and proved very satisfactory in service, but Dorman Long did not approve. There had been a change of opinion among their engineers as well as a change of circumstances, and they were now favouring diesel locomotives. The last two steam receiver locos were built but never delivered and ultimately all four were converted to diesel hydraulic.

=== Diesel production commences ===
The prototype Sentinel diesel locomotive was built and ready to commence trials on the former Shropshire and Montgomeryshire Railway (then under military control) early in 1959. It met with the approval and enthusiasm of the company's prospective customers and before the end of the year 17 locomotives had been sold and delivered. The company was ready to produce a maximum of four locomotives a month.

By 1963, four different Sentinel diesel models were being produced, commencing with the 34-ton chain drive 0-4-0 powered by the Rolls-Royce C6SFL six-cylinder engine of 233 bhp (174 kW) (gross) (later uprated to 255 bhp (190 kW)). This was followed within a year by a 48-ton 0-6-0 rod coupled machine, fitted with a Rolls-Royce C8SFL eight-cylinder engine of 311 bhp (232 kW) (gross) (later uprated to 325 bhp (242 kW)). Between 1963 and 1966, a fleet of these diesel locomotives, eventually numbering five 0-6-0s and eighteen 0-4-0s, was supplied to the Manchester Ship Canal Company for use on the navigation's private railway network.

Also, in 1966 the Portuguese Railways were supplied with thirty six 42-ton 0-6-0s fitted with C8TFL Mk IV engines. These were destined for shunter services as CP Class 1150

These Sentinels demonstrated their suitability for heavy work, but heavier and more powerful locos were called for, particularly by the steel industry, and before the end of 1963 a 74 ton 0-8-0 powered by paired C8SFL engines and a 40-ton 0-4-0 fitted with a C8SFL engine had been added to the range.

=== Sentinel Steelman ===
A shaft drive 600 hp (450 kW) 0-6-0 machine was now being developed at Shrewsbury using the new DV8T engine. Considerable interest in this loco was expressed by Stewart and Lloyds mineral division at Corby who were operating more than 20 steam locos, mainly of the Austerity type. This new locomotive Steelman was eventually delivered to Corby in late 1967, about two years overdue. The prototype locomotive proved satisfactory and three more were ordered by Stewart and Lloyds and one by Richard Thomas and Baldwins, Scunthorpe. Stewart and Lloyds' programme to replace more than 20 steam locos over the next few years the future for Steelman looked good.

British Railways offered Stewart and Lloyds 26 second-hand Swindon-built Class 14 diesel hydraulic locomotives. The rod-coupled Class 14 were powered by a 650 hp (480 kW) Paxman engine with Voith Transmission and were capable of doing the work required at a fraction of the price of new Steelman locomotives. No further "Steelman" locos were built at Shrewsbury.

In 1979, ICI Billingham wanted two heavy locomotives to replace their ageing Yorkshire Janus locomotives. Their engineers visited many industrial sites, and steelworks in particular, to evaluate available locomotives. Their requirements were discussed with various UK locomotive manufacturers, and they ordered an updated version of the Sentinel Steelman design. Two machines were delivered toward the end of 1981.

UK sales of Sentinel locos were now fewer than 10 per year, their only overseas success had been to license the assembly of 36 0-6-0 locomotives by Sorefame for the Portuguese Railways in 1965/66. These locomotives became the CP Class 1150.

== Road vehicles ==
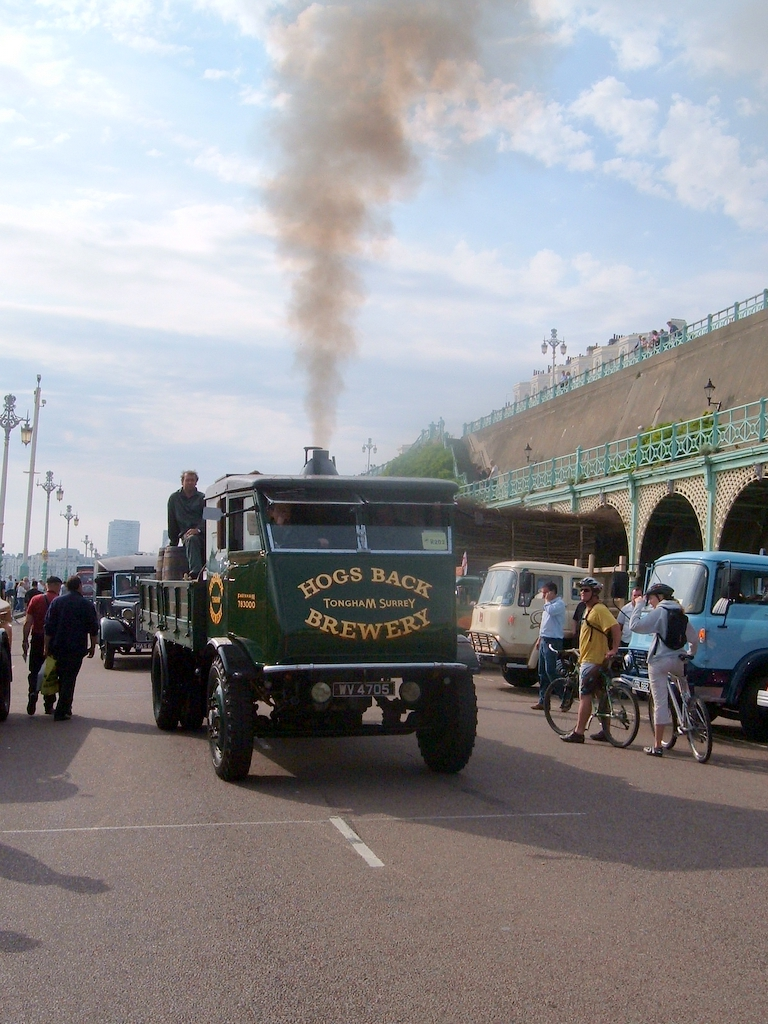
Preserved 1934-built S4 dropside in steam

=== Steam wagons ===
- Alley & MacLellan five-ton steam wagon (1906) – now commonly referred to as the "Standard" Sentinel
- Super Sentinel (1923)
- Sentinel DG4 (1928)
- Sentinel DG6 (1927)
- Sentinel DG8 (1929) – world's first four-axle, twin steer truck
- Sentinel S4 (1933)
- Sentinel S6 (1933)
- Sentinel S8 (1933)

=== Diesel lorries ===
- Sentinel HSG (1938)
- Sentinel DV44 (1947)
- Sentinel DV46 (1949)
- Sentinel DV66 (1950)
- Sentinel aircraft tug

=== Diesel buses ===
- Sentinel 32-seat bus (1924)
- Sentinel HSG (1935)
- Sentinel SLC4-40 (1948)
- Sentinel STC6-44 (1950)
- Sentinel SL chassis (1951)

== Railway vehicles ==
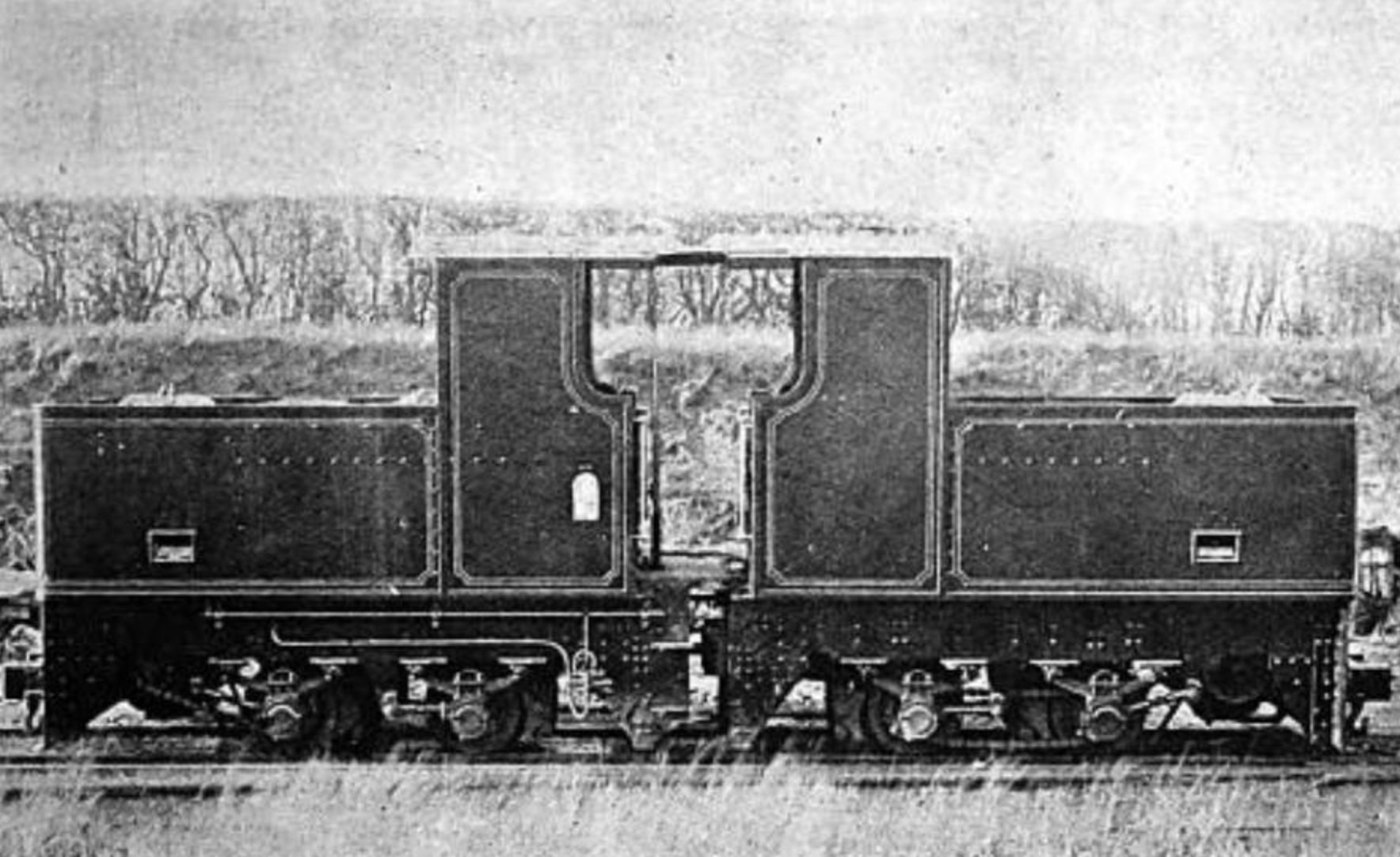
Sentinel steam locomotive built in 1926 for the Kettering Ironstone Railway

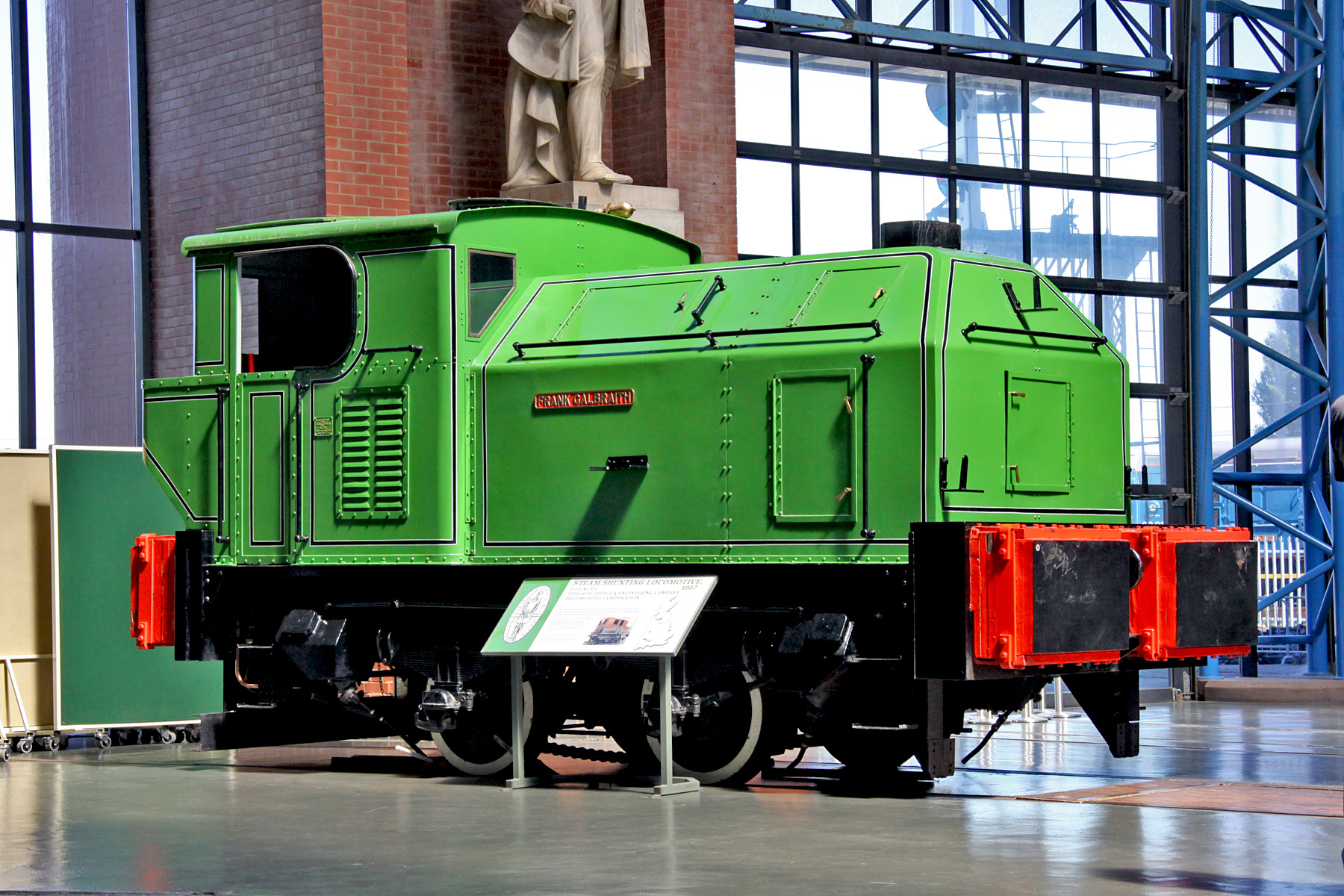
Sentinel chain-drive shunter of 1957

The locomotives and railcars (with a few exceptions) used the standard steam lorry boilers and engine units.

=== CE Class ===
Centre Engine

=== BE Class ===
Balanced Engine

- LMS Sentinel 7164

=== DE Class ===
Double Engine

=== 100 hp steam locomotives ===
- Works no. 6515/1926, Isham Quarries, Northamptonshire, (ex-GWR No. 12)
- Works no. 6520/1926, "Toby" 0-4-0VG; Port of Par, Cornwall. (Replaced 1876 Manning Wardle 0-4-0ST "Punch". Replaced by Bagnall 0-4-0ST "Alfred" and "Judy").
- Works no. 6807/1928, "Gervase"; rebuilt as a vertical-boilered geared locomotive from 1900 Manning Wardle. (Moved to Kent & East Sussex Railway in 1972, and to the Elsecar Heritage Railway in 2008.)
- Works no. 7026/1928, British Quarrying Co., Criggion, Montgomeryshire
- Works no. 7299/1928, Corby Quarries, Rockingham Forest, (ex-Phoenix Tube Works)
- Works no. 9365/1945, "Belvedere"; Isham Quarries, Northamptonshire, (ex-Thomas Hill, Rotherham): preserved at Northamptonshire Ironstone Railway Trust
- Works no. 9369/1946, "Musketeer"; Isham Quarries, Northamptonshire, (ex-Williams & Williams, Hooton): preserved at Northamptonshire Ironstone Railway Trust
- Works no. 9615/1956, Oxfordshire Ironstone Quarries, Banbury
- LMS Sentinels 7160-3
- LNER Class Y1
- LNER Class Y3

=== 200 hp steam locomotives ===
- LNER Class Y10
- S&DJR Sentinels
- Works no. 7109/1927, Croydon Gasworks No. 37 "Joyce", preserved at Midsomer Norton railway station

=== Railcars ===
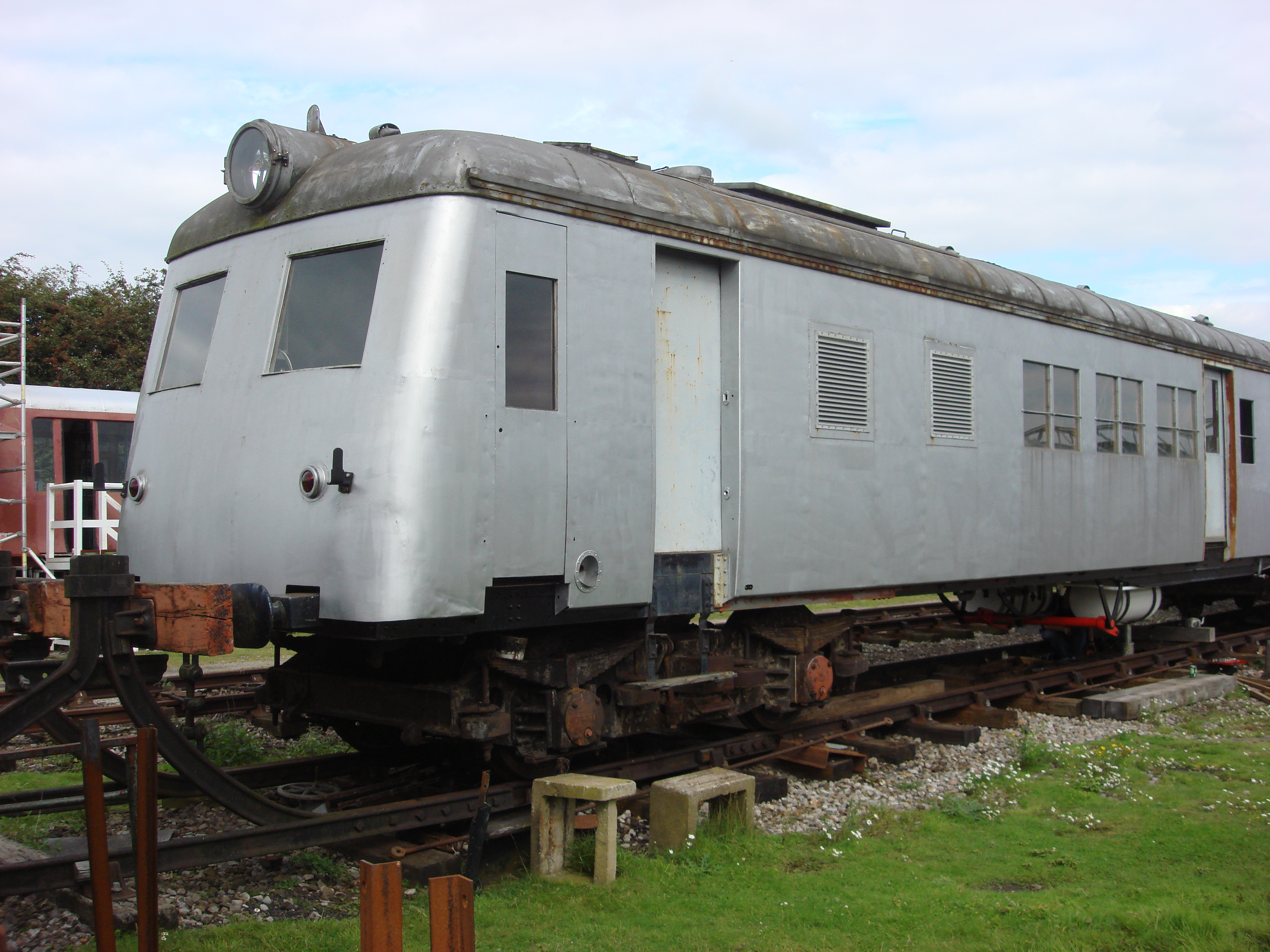
1951-built articulated Sentinel-Cammell steam railcar, No. 5208, at the Buckinghamshire Railway Centre

- In 1923, the Jersey Railways & Tramways purchased a railcar for use on their line between St Helier and St Aubin.
- In 1925, the New Zealand Railways Department bought one Sentinel-Cammell steam railcar which became part of its RM class.
- Between 1925 and 1932, the London and North Eastern Railway bought 80 Sentinel steam railcars and four were supplied to the LNER-controlled Cheshire Lines Committee.
- In 1928, Palestine Railways bought two Sentinel-Cammell articulated steam railcars for local services. Each unit had two cars articulated over three bogies. Palestine Railways found the railcar format inflexible, as if passenger numbers exceeded the capacity of a train it was not practical to couple up an extra coach. In 1945 PR removed the Sentinel engines and converted the railcars to ordinary coaching stock.
- In 1931, the Tasmanian Government Railways received two 61 ft 5 in single engine Sentinel-Cammell railcars which became known as the SP Class. In 1934 two more 68 ft 2 in cars were received, and owing to higher maintenance requirements, in 1937 five more cars were received with twin-engine oil-firing boilers. In the 1950s as more diesel railcars were introduced, the boilers and engines were removed and they continued as passenger stock.
- In 1933, the Southern Railway bought a Sentinel-Cammell steam railcar for use on the Devil's Dyke branch, in East Sussex. Although operationally successful, the single railcar was not large enough to meet the needs of this line. It was transferred away from the line in March 1936 and tried in other areas, but was withdrawn in 1940.
- In 1935, the Ferrocarril Central del Paraguay (Paraguay Central Railway) acquired three oil-fired railcars with trailers for the suburban service between Asunción and Ypacarai.
- In 1951, Egyptian National Railways bought 10 articulated steam railcars. Each had three carriage bodies articulated over four bogies. One is preserved by the Quainton Railway Society at the Buckinghamshire Railway Centre, England.

=== Specials ===
==== The Doble Shunter ====
- LMS Sentinel 7192 – so-called as it was fitted with an Abner Doble boiler

==== The Double Locomotive ====
A special locomotive was produced at Sentinel, for Dorman Long and named "Princess". It consisted of 2 x 0-6-0 chassis coupled together to articulate. One unit carried the cab, a 5 drum oil-fired Woolnough boiler and two 100 hp (75 kW) engines. The other unit housed the water and fuel tanks and also two more 100 hp (75 kW) engines providing a total of 400 hp (300 kW). It was considered a magnificent machine by the staff but was ultimately never replicated.

==== The Gyro locomotive ====
Another special was the NCB Gyro or Electrogyro Locomotive. Based on a 200 hp (150 kW) 4-wheeled 0-4-0 frame fitted with two "gyro units" (see Flywheel energy storage) made by Maschinenfabrik Oerlikon of Switzerland. The gyros were principally a 3 ton horizontal flywheel enclosed in a vessel filled with low pressure hydrogen. A vertically mounted three-phase squirrel-cage electric motor/generator was directly coupled to each flywheel shaft. The motor took its power from a side-mounted supply at static posts via a four-contact swinging arm extended or retracted pneumatically by the driver. Power could only be taken whilst the loco was stationary alongside one of these posts. When the gyros had reached the required speed, the driver would retract the contact arm, switch the motor to generation and controlled the locomotive in a similar way to a diesel-electric loco. Charging posts had to be strategically placed around the site. A contact arm was provided on each side of the locomotive, although it is not clear if posts were installed on one or both sides of the track. Each gyro operated between 3,000 rpm when fully 'charged;' and 1,800 rpm before recharging. Recharging took 2 1/2 minutes and the locomotive could work for around 30 minutes before recharging. It weighed 34 tons and had a maximum speed of 15 mph (24 km/h).

This machine was specially built for the National Coal Board (NCB) at Seaton Delaval. The intention was to investigate the use of gyroscopic storage as a potential method for a flameproof and emissions-free underground locomotive. It operated from 1958, very satisfactorily, but was eventually taken out of service because of site development and its restricted field of operation. In April 1965 it was converted for the NCB to a diesel hydraulic machine.

==== The Receiver Locomotives ====
The Receiver Locomotives were another special type built just for Dorman Long and were based on the idea of a Fireless locomotive.

=== Steam locomotives used by UK mainline companies ===
- LNER Class Y1
- LNER Class Y3
- LNER Class Y10
- S&DJR Sentinels
- LMS Sentinels 7160-3
- LMS Sentinel 7164
- LMS Sentinel 7192

== Preservation ==
=== Road vehicles ===
A number of Sentinel steam wagons and tractors exist in preservation in the UK—about 117 as of 2008. One notable survival is Elizabeth (GT2827), a DG6P steam lorry built in 1931, but subsequently converted to a bus, and operated for some years on tourist services in the English seaside towns of Whitby (2005-2015) and Weston-super-Mare (2015-2018). It is now preserved in a private collection.

Sentinel vehicles are often shown at steam fairs in the UK. For more information see the Sentinel Drivers Club website. A number also exist in Australia and other countries.

=== Railway locomotives ===
==== United Kingdom ====
There are several surviving steam and diesel locomotives located at various heritage railways around the UK, including: the Elsecar Heritage Railway, the Middleton Railway, the Foxfield Light Railway and the Chasewater Railway.

Preserved Sentinel locomotives in the United Kingdom
Steam engines are standard gauge, 4-wheel, vertical boiler, geared tank locomotives (4wVBGT), unless otherwise stated.
Name or number	Works number	Date built	Class	Where preserved	Notes	Status	Image
	6155	1925	Conversion	Ironbridge Gorge Museums, Shropshire	Mostly complete	Stored	
Coalbrookdale No5	6185	1925	Conversion	Ironbridge Gorge Museums, Shropshire	Missing most parts	Stored	
GWR No. 12; Isebrook	6515	1926	Y1	Cholsey & Wallingford Railway	Privately owned	Operational	
Joyce	7109	1927	200 hp	Chinnor & Princes Risborough Railway		Operational	
Ann	7232	1927		Keighley and Worth Valley Railway	Privately owned	Operational	
Gervase	6807	1928	Conversion	Elsecar Heritage Railway	Conversion of a 1900 Manning Wardle	Operational	
Fry	7492	1928		Avon Valley Railway		Operational	
Nutty	7701	1927		Leighton Buzzard Narrow Gauge Railway (On loan from NGRM)	gauged to 2 ft 11 originally currently at 2 ft 6 after working on the Welshpool railway for some years.	Stored out of use	
Gas Bag; No. 7	8024	1929	Conversion	Ribble Steam Railway		Awaiting overhaul	
LNER No. 54	8837	1933	Y1	Middleton Railway		Operational	
Belvedere	9365	1946		Northamptonshire Ironstone Railway Trust		Awaiting restoration	
11	9366	1945		Chasewater Railway		Operational	
Musketeer	9369	1946		Northamptonshire Ironstone Railway Trust		Awaiting restoration	
Neepsend 2	9370	1946		Great Central Railway		Awaiting overhaul	
St Monans	9373	1947	100 hp	Ribble Steam Railway		Awaiting overhaul	
1	9374	1947	100 hp	Jersey	Parts have been used to rebuild a sentinel rail car	Broken up	
7	9376	1947		Elsecar Heritage Railway		Broken up	
	9387	1948		Sandford Station Railway Heritage Centre	First used by Roads Reconstruction at Whatley Quarry in Frome where it was No.3, withdrawn c1971 and donated to Frome Town Council (in Nov 1971), put on display at Welshmill Adventure Playground, Frome prior to March 1976 in a yellow livery. Moved in August 1998 by its owners (Hanson Aggregates) to be and a gate guardian at the company's Tytherington Quarry near Thornbury in Gloucestershire, painted in Hanson's corporate blue livery. Acquired 2015 by the Sandford Station Railway Heritage Centre, cosmetically restored at the Severn Valley Railway and placed on static display at Sandford Station in March 2016.	Static display	https://www.svrwiki.com/File:Phearn23092017.JPG
5208	9418			Buckinghamshire Railway Centre		Awaiting overhaul	
	9535	1952		Foxfield Railway		Awaiting overhaul	
Susan; No. 7	9537	1952	100 hp	Barry Island Railway		Operational	
4	9559	1953	100 hp	North Tyneside Steam Railway		Awaiting overhaul	
John	9561		100 hp	Coatbridge, Strathclyde		Awaiting restoration	
	9593				Parts were used to create a sentinel steam lorry	Broken up	
George	9596	1955		Private site in Yaxham		undergoing restoration	
William	9599	1956		Elsecar Heritage Railway		Operational	
Swansea Vale; No. 1	9622	1958		East Kent Light Railway		Awaiting overhaul	
Ranald	9627	1957	100 hp	Bo'ness and Kinneil Railway		Awaiting overhaul	
Robin	9628	1957		Summerlee Heritage Park		Awaiting overhaul	
Frank Galbraith	9629	1957	100 hp	National Railway Museum, York		On display	
Denis	9631	1958	100 hp	Bo'ness and Kinneil Railway		Awaiting overhaul	
7	9632	1957		Chasewater Railway		Operational	
P.B.A.39.	10218	1965	325 hp	East Somerset Railway		Operational	
General Lord Robertson WD 890 Army 610	10143	1963	650 hp	Avon Valley Railway	Originally built for Longmoor Military Railway	Stored out of use	

==== South America ====
Three Sentinel steam locos were used at Amsted Maxion's railway equipment plant in Cruzeiro, SP (Brazil). All three were 0-4-0T locomotives built in 1931 to 5 ft 3 in (1,600 mm) gauge. Two of them worked until 2014. They were the last commercially operating steam locomotives in Brazil until then. After they were shut down, they were bought by ABPF (Associação Brasileira de Preservação Ferroviária) after a long negotiation that took more than one year. Now they are preserved at ABPF shops in Cruzeiro, near Amsted Maxion's plant:

- Sentinel #8398 – ex SPR No. 166 and EFSJ #166; kept its numbering after 1960 at FNV and continues as No. 166.
- Sentinel #8399 – ex SPR No. 167 and EFSJ #167; kept its numbering after 1960 at FNV and continues as No. 167.
- Sentinel #8400 – ex SPR No. 168 and EFSJ #168; kept its numbering after 1960 at FNV and at Amsted Maxion. After an unsuccessful attempt to convert it to diesel power, it was withdrawn and was scrapped at the plant's facilities.

== Models ==
=== OO gauge models ===
Dapol has produced the Y1 and Y3 steam locomotive in various liveries including BR, LNER, LMS and NCB.

Hornby has produced two models of Sentinel's diesel locomotives in various liveries.

0-4-0 DH

- R3179 ESSO 4wDM Diesel, Sentinel Locootive, 'Cattewater'
- R3180 Tarmac 4wDM Diesel, Sentinel Locomotive
- R3353 Balfour Beatty, Sentinel Diesel
- R30009 London Carriers International, Sentinel, 0-4-0, 'Jean'
- R30010 Hitachi, Sentinel, 0-4-0, 'Chiaki Ueda'

0-6-0 DH

- R30083 Port of Bristol Authority, Sentinel, 0-6-0, 39
- R300084 MSC, Sentinel, 0-6-0, 3001
- R300085 NCB, Sentinel, 0-6-0, Stanton No. 57
- R30306 London Transport, Sentinel, 0-6-0, DL. 81
- R30307 Potter Logistics, Sentinel, 0-6-0, 'Pride of the Fens'

=== O gauge models ===
Dapol has produced the Y1 and Y3 steam locomotive in various liveries including BR, LNER, LMS and NCB.

== See also ==
- Sentinel boiler
- Steam motor
- Thomas Hill (Rotherham) Ltd
- Geared steam locomotive
- Rolls-Royce Limited

== Sources ==
- Ian Allan ABC of British Railways Locomotives, 1948 edition

== Bibliography ==
- Bradley, D.L. (1975). Locomotives of the Southern Railway, part 1. London: Railway Correspondence and Travel Society. ISBN 0-901115-30-4.
- Cotterell, Paul (1984). The Railways of Palestine and Israel. Abingdon: Tourret Publishing. p. 49. ISBN 0-905878-04-3.
- Robotham, William Arthur (1970). Silver Ghosts and Silver Dawn. London: Constable.
