= GWR No. 12 =

Class of 1 British geared tank locomotive

GWR No. 12 No 2 Isebrook (from 1934)
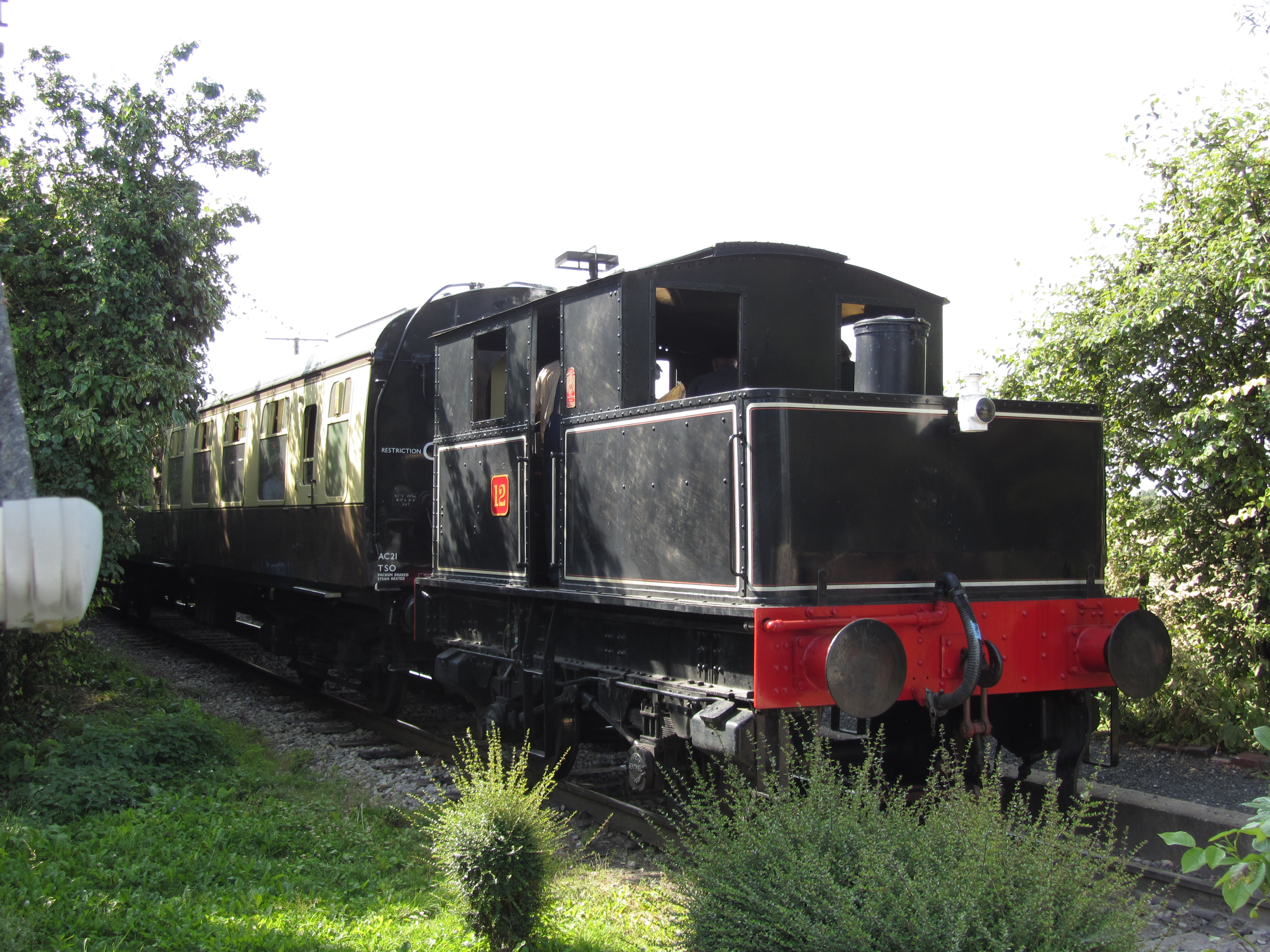
- No. 12 at the Chinnor and Princes Risborough Railway in 2012
Type and origin
- Power type: Steam
- Designer: Sentinel Waggon Works
- Builder: Sentinel Waggon Works
- Build date: 1926
- Total produced: 1
Specifications
- Configuration
  - Whyte: 0-4-0 geared tank
- Gauge: 4 ft 8 1/2 in (1,435 mm)
- Driver dia.: 2 ft 6 in (0.76 m)
- Loco weight: 20 tons 17 cwt
- Fuel type: coal
- Boiler pressure: 275 psi (1.90 MPa) water tube boiler
- Cylinders: two
- Cylinder size: 6 3/4 in × 9 in (170 mm × 230 mm)
Career
- Operators: GWR
- Retired: 1958
- Disposition: Preserved

GWR No. 12 is a Sentinel geared steam locomotive which was built for the Great Western Railway and delivered in 1926. Its Sentinel works number is 6515. It was equipped to work train vacuum brakes and to provide steam heat for passenger trains. Initially, it was based at Swindon and used to work trains on the Malmesbury branch. Later, it worked at Brentford Goods Yard. These trials were not a great success and the locomotive was withdrawn in December 1926 and returned to Sentinel in January 1927.

== Rebuilding ==
The locomotive was rebuilt by Sentinel with a larger boiler in 1927. It then underwent further trials as follows:

- 1927, Shropshire and Montgomeryshire Railway
- 1927, Further trials on the GWR
- 1927–1929, Works shunter for Sentinel at Shrewsbury
- 1929, Trial on the London, Midland and Scottish Railway (LMS) at Shrewsbury
- 1929–1934, Works shunter for Sentinel at Shrewsbury again
- 1934, Sold to Thomas E. Grey Ltd, Burton Latimer, Northamptonshire. Here, it was given the number 2 and the name Isebrook.

== Withdrawal ==
In 1958, the locomotive was withdrawn. The boiler and parts of the engine were removed and it was used as a brake van. In 1972, it was condemned and was then bought for preservation and moved to the Buckinghamshire Railway Centre at Quainton.

== Restoration ==
Restoration took seven years and included fitting a reconditioned boiler and engine. The engine was first steamed in preservation on 26 August 1979. In 1981, vacuum brake equipment was refitted for passenger train working.

== Preservation history ==
After a period of operation at Quainton, the locomotive moved in 2001 to Rosemary Vineyards on the Isle of Wight, and then on to the Lavender Line. In June 2008, it returned to Quainton. It spent the summer of 2012 at the Chinnor and Princes Risborough Railway, and also made a brief visit to Didcot Railway Centre.

In August 2019 the locomotive moved to the Cholsey and Wallingford Railway, where it remains as of 2026.
