= LMS Sentinels 7160–7163 =

LMS 7160–7163
Type and origin
- Power type: Steam
- Builder: Sentinel Waggon Works, Shrewsbury
- Serial number: 8209–8212
- Build date: 1930
Specifications
- Configuration
  - Whyte: 0-4-0T
  - UIC: B n2t
- Gauge: 4 ft 8 1/2 in (1,435 mm) standard gauge
- Driver dia.: 2 ft 6 in (0.762 m)
- Wheelbase: 7 ft 0 in (2.13 m)
- Length: 19 ft 4 in (5.89 m)
- Loco weight: 20.85 long tons (21.18 t; 23.35 short tons)
- Fuel capacity: 0.8 long tons (0.81 t; 0.90 short tons)
- Water cap.: 300 imp gal (1,400 L; 360 US gal)
- Boiler pressure: 275 lbf/in^{2} (1.90 MPa)
- Heating surface
  - Firebox: 36 1/2 sq ft (3.39 m^{2})
  - Tubes: 35 sq ft (3.3 m^{2})
- Cylinders: Two, inside
- Cylinder size: 6 3/4 in × 9 in (171 mm × 229 mm)
Career
- Operators: London, Midland and Scottish Railway; British Railways
- Power class: 0F
- Number in class: 4
- Numbers: LMS: 7160–7163; later 7180–7183; BR: 47180–47183
- Withdrawn: 1953–1956
- Disposition: All scrapped

The London, Midland and Scottish Railway (LMS) Sentinels 7160–7163, later renumbered 7180–7183 and by British Railways 47180–47183, was a class of small vertical boilered chain-driven shunting locomotives.

== Overview ==
They were built by Sentinel Waggon Works of Shrewsbury in 1930, makers Nos 8209–8212. 47180 was withdrawn in 1953, 47183 in 1955 and 47181 and 47182 in 1956. All were scrapped.
