= CP Class 1150 =

Portuguese shunting locomotive

Class 1150
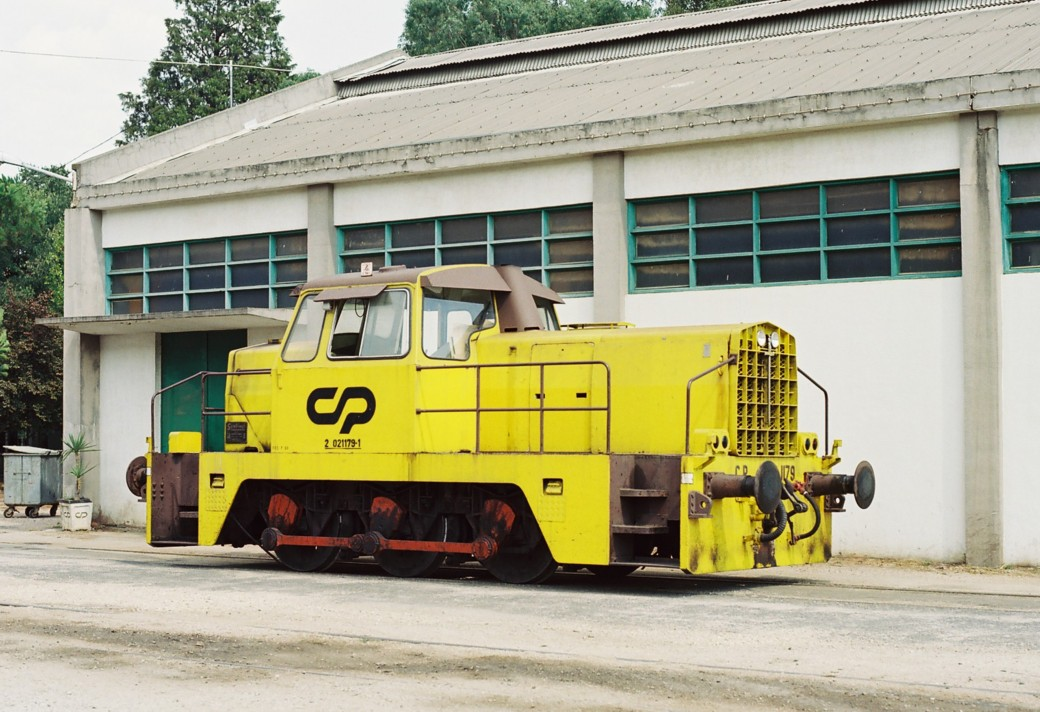
- Example shown in 2003
Type and origin
- Power type: Diesel-hydraulic
- Builder: Sentinel
- Build date: 1966-1967
Specifications
- Prime mover: Rolls-Royce
Performance figures
- Maximum speed: 58 km/h (36 mph)
Career
- Operators: Comboios de Portugal
- Class: Série 1150
- Locale: Portugal

Série 1150 are small Sentinel shunting locomotives (with diesel-hydraulic engines built by Rolls-Royce) built in 1966-1967 for Portuguese Railways (CP). They are based on the "Steelman" shunting locomotive used at various industrial plants arounds the UK. They have a maximum speed of 58 km/h (36 mph). As of 2012, seven locomotives remain in service.
