= LNER Class Y1 =

Class of British steam locomotive

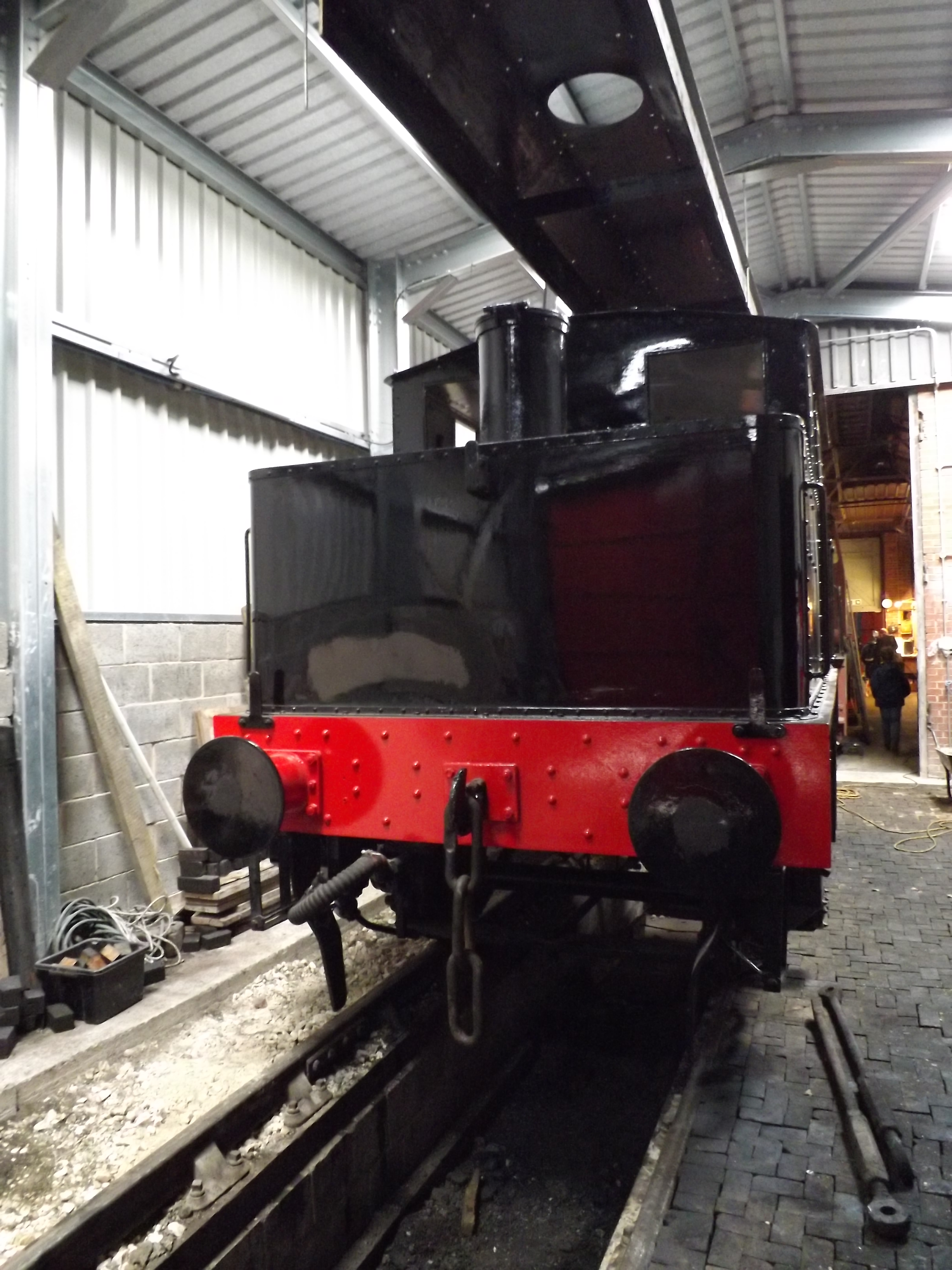
- Preserved 68153 at the Middleton Railway
Type and origin
- Power type: Steam
- Designer: Sentinel Waggon Works
- Builder: Sentinel Waggon Works
- Build date: 1925-1933
- Total produced: 24
Specifications
- Configuration
  - Whyte: 0-4-0 geared tank
- Gauge: 4 ft 8 1/2 in (1,435 mm)
- Driver dia.: 2 ft 6 in (0.76 m)
- Wheelbase: 7 ft 0 in (2.13 m)
- Loco weight: Y1/1, 20.35 long tons (20.68 t); Y1/2, 19.8 long tons (20.1 t); Y1/3, 14 long tons (14 t); Y1/4, 19.35 long tons (19.66 t)
- Fuel type: coal
- Fuel capacity: 0.6–0.8 long tons (0.61–0.81 t)
- Water cap.: 300 imp gal (1,400 L; 360 US gal)
- Firebox
  - Grate area: 3.97 sq ft (0.369 m^{2}) (all but Y1/2); 5.1 sq ft (0.47 m^{2}) (Y1/2)
- Boiler: 2 ft 8 1/2 in (0.826 m) (all but Y1/2); 3 ft 1 in (0.94 m) (Y1/2)
- Boiler pressure: 275 psi (1.90 MPa) water tube boiler
- Heating surface
  - Firebox: 26.7 sq ft (2.48 m^{2}) (all but Y1/2); 35 sq ft (3.3 m^{2}) (Y1/2)
  - Tubes: 27.73 sq ft (2.576 m^{2}) (all but Y1/2); 36.5 sq ft (3.39 m^{2}) (Y1/2)
  - Total surface: 64.15 sq ft (5.960 m^{2}) (all but Y1/2)
- Superheater
  - Heating area: 9.72 sq ft (0.903 m^{2}) (all but Y1/2)
- Cylinders: two
- Cylinder size: 6 3/4 in × 9 in (170 mm × 230 mm)
Performance figures
- Tractive effort: 68130-68142 and 68152-68153: 7,260 lbf (32,300 N); 68143-68151: 8,870 lbf (39,500 N)
Career
- Operators: London and North Eastern Railway, British Railways
- Disposition: 1 preserved, remainder scrapped

The LNER Class Y1 was a class of 0-4-0 geared steam locomotives built by Sentinel Waggon Works for the London and North Eastern Railway and introduced in 1925. They passed into British Railways ownership in 1948 and were numbered 68130-68153 but 68134 was withdrawn almost immediately and may not have carried its BR number.

== Power unit ==
The superheated vertical water-tube boiler and the engine were similar to those used in Sentinel steam wagons. There were variations within the class as regards boiler size and fuel capacity and these were denoted by sub-classes Y1/1 to Y1/4.

The engines had poppet valves and reversing was by sliding camshaft. The advantage of the water-tube boiler was that steam could be raised much more quickly than with a conventional fire-tube boiler.

== Transmission ==
Final drive to the wheels was by sprocket chain. Some engines had a gear ratio of 11:25 and some 9:25. Tractive effort was:

- Ratio 11:25 — 7,260 lbf (32.3 kN) (68130-68142 and 68152-68153)
- Ratio 9:25 — 8,870 lbf (39.5 kN) (68143-68151)

== Sub-classes ==
- Y1/1, 68130-68135 and 68152 (total 7)
- Y1/2, 68137, 68138, 68140-68151, 68153 (total 15)
- Y1/3, 68139 (total 1)
- Y1/4, 68136 (total 1)

There is disagreement between sources. According to LNER Encyclopedia there were six Y1/1s and sixteen Y1/2s.

== Preservation ==
- Class Y1 number 68153 is preserved on the Middleton Railway.
