= Sentinel boiler =

Type of steam-generating furnace

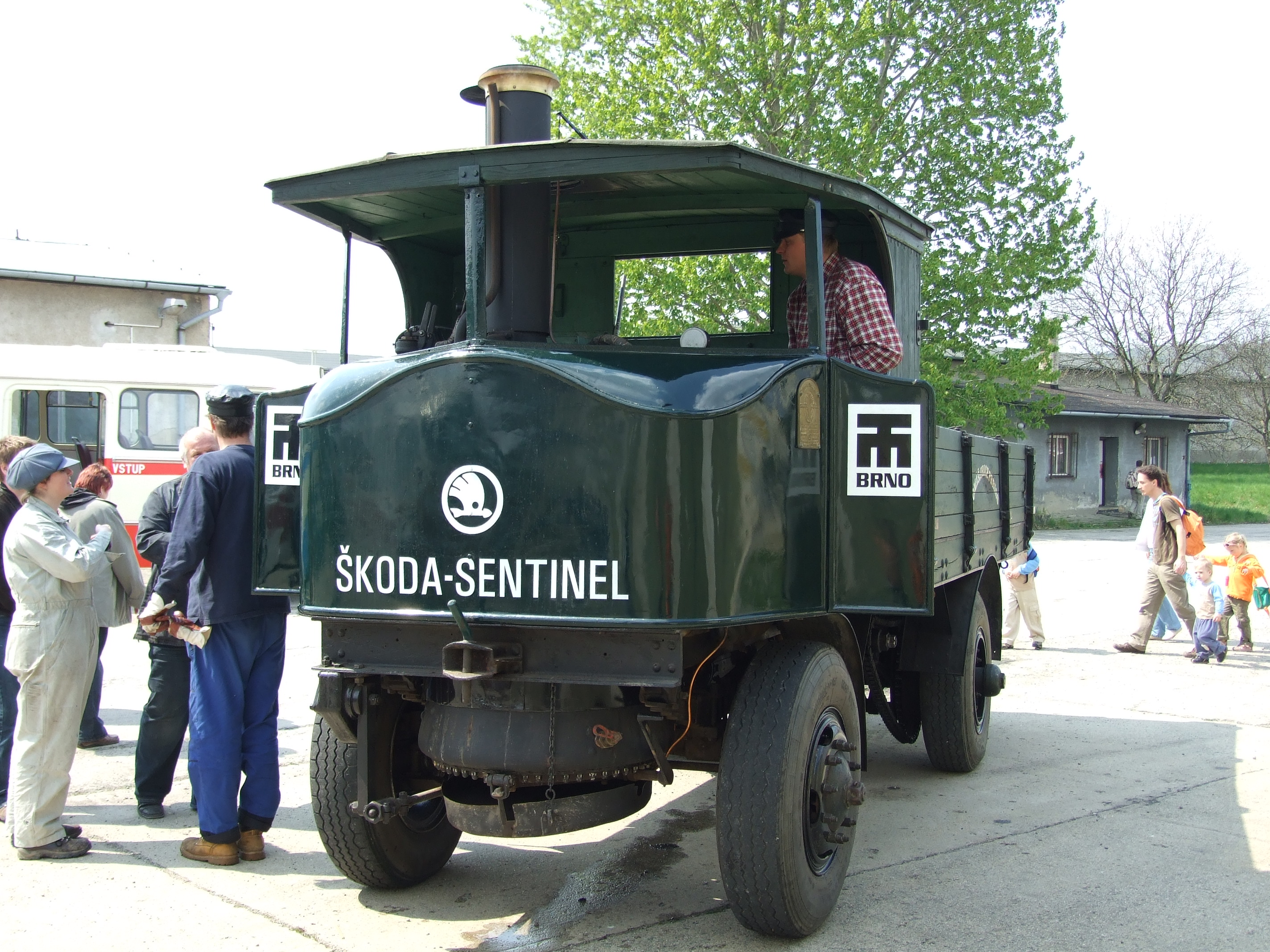
Škoda-Sentinel "Super Sentinel" steam wagon

The Sentinel boiler was a design of vertical boiler, fitted to the numerous steam wagons built by the Sentinel Waggon Works.

The boiler was carefully designed for use in a steam wagon: it was compact, easy to handle whilst driving, and its maintenance features recognised the problems of poor feedwater quality and the need for it to be maintained by a small operator, rather than a major locomotive works.

Although this design was used in most of Sentinel's products, they also produced larger boilers of quite different types for their railway locomotives.

== Description ==
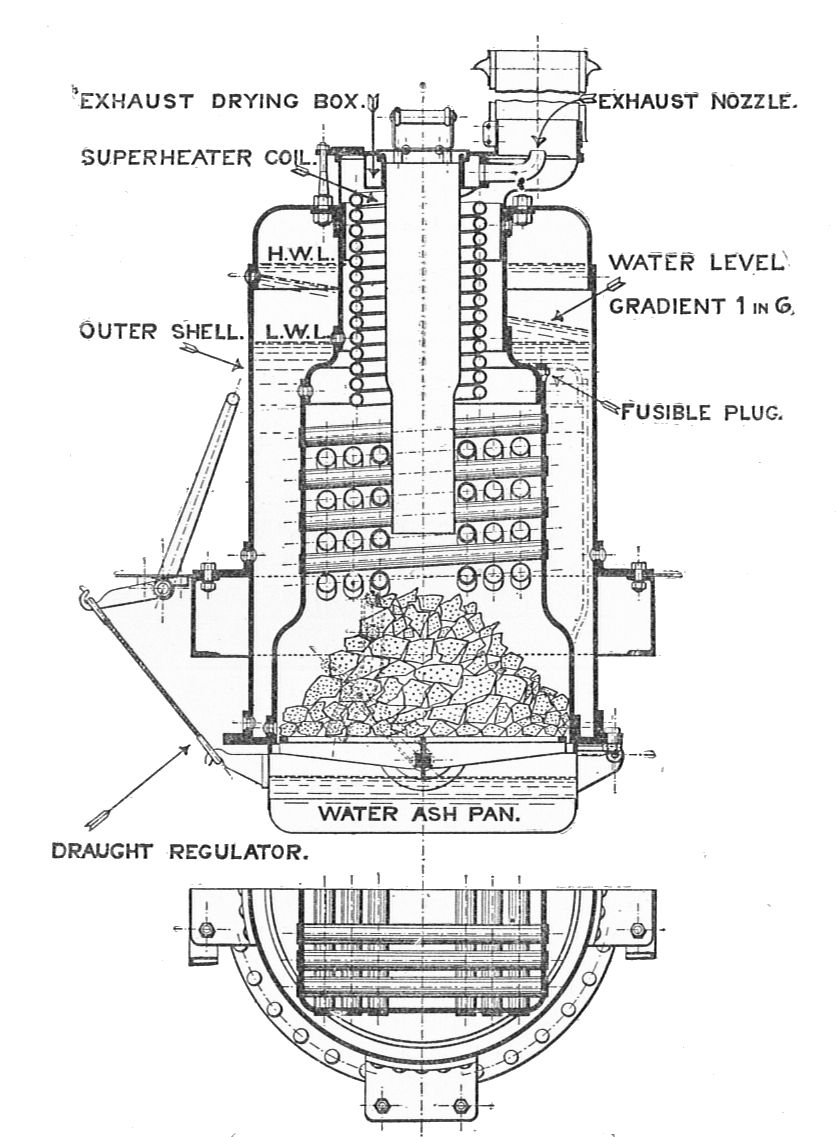
Section through a Sentinel boiler

Sentinel boilers are vertical, as was common for many designs of steam wagon, so as to reduce the effects of tilting due to hill climbing or uneven roads disturbing the water level. It also provides a compact boiler that leaves adequate space in the cab for the crew, controls and coal bunker, whilst leaving as much as possible of the wagon's overall length available for the useful load.

The boiler is a watertube boiler, with these tubes contained within a vertical, cylindrical outer drum. This drum is double-walled and forms a water jacket around the boiler, with a large vertical flue within. The inner flue has a complex cross section. It is stepped in three diameters, tapering towards the top. The central region is square in section, rather than round.

The main heating surface is provided by water-tubes in this squared section. These tubes are short, straight and pass between the flat faces of the squared section in a grid pattern. There are eight layers of tubes, four banks of six each way.

A space is left in the centre of the water-tube banks for the firing chute. The firebox is top-fired (and lit) through this chute and there is no side firedoor. The lower part of the water-jacketed barrel surrounds the firebox. The narrow waterspace here encourages rapid steam raising. Firing is simple, with a thick fire relative to its area and fuel simply poured down. Beneath the grate is a water-filled ashpan, to prevent hot embers falling onto the road. Draught is controlled by a damper in the side of the ashpan, between the grate and the water tray.

Above the tube nest the water space widens to form an increased reservoir, protecting against tilting. Sentinel's drawings permitted a hill climb gradient of 1 in 6, approximately 9.5°. Modern regulations for buses require a safe tilt of 35°. The narrowed flue in this area is used, where fitted, to house the superheater.

An unusual feature of the Sentinel boiler was the "exhaust drying box", a small reheater, in the upper part of the boiler flue, immediately before the blastpipe nozzle. This heated the exhaust steam to avoid it condensing into a visible white plume. It was a requirement of the Highways and Locomotives (Amendment) Act 1878 (41 & 42 Vict. c. 77) that engines should "consume their own smoke".

=== Washout ===
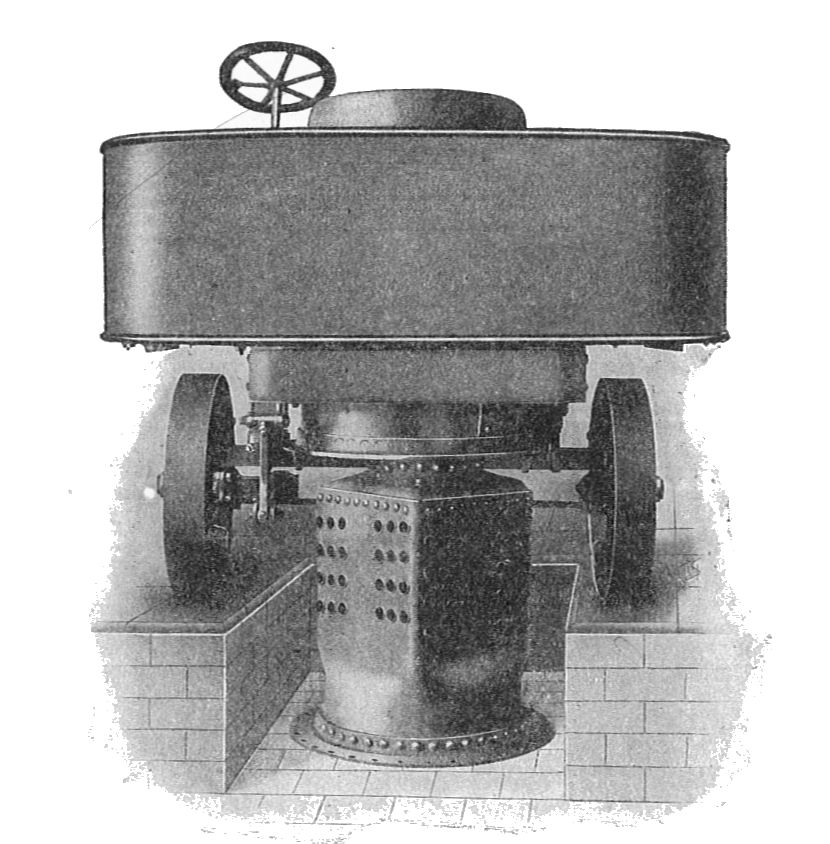
Sentinel "5 tonner" steam wagon of 1906, with boiler dismantled for cleaning

By the nature of their use, steam wagons were often required to use feedwater that was either dirty or contaminated with dissolved minerals. Untreated, this builds up boiler scale on the tubes and particularly deposits sludge in the lower parts of the boiler. Both of these disturb circulation and risk local overheating and damage, scale also reduces boiler efficiency and wastes fuel.

The Sentinel boiler was designed to cope with these problems, and to permit easy cleaning of the waterspace. As well as the usual blow-down cock for daily use, the entire boiler could be dismantled easily. The outer shell was in two sections, inner and outer drum, and were joined by a bolted ring joint at top and bottom. Regular servicing (depending on water conditions) was to separate the water-tubes in their drum from the boiler outer shell, so that they could be cleaned. Sludge dropped free on opening the shell and the short, straight tubes could easily be cleaned with brush or scraper.

Several other vertical boilers, such as the Straker, had similar arrangements for lifting their shells off the tube nest. The Sentinel though left the outer shell in place and instead dropped the tube nest downwards (having first removed the ashpan). This had the advantages that it required simpler lifting gear: the wagon would be raised on ramps or over a pit, the bolts removed and then the tube bank lowered with a block and tackle from a fixed beam, without requiring a mobile crane that could lift it and then move it sideways. Secondly the many pipe connections to the outer shell were left undisturbed, making the operation quicker.

Dropping the firebox was not required at every washout and was recommended at intervals of 2 to 12 months, depending on water quality.

=== Firebox shape ===
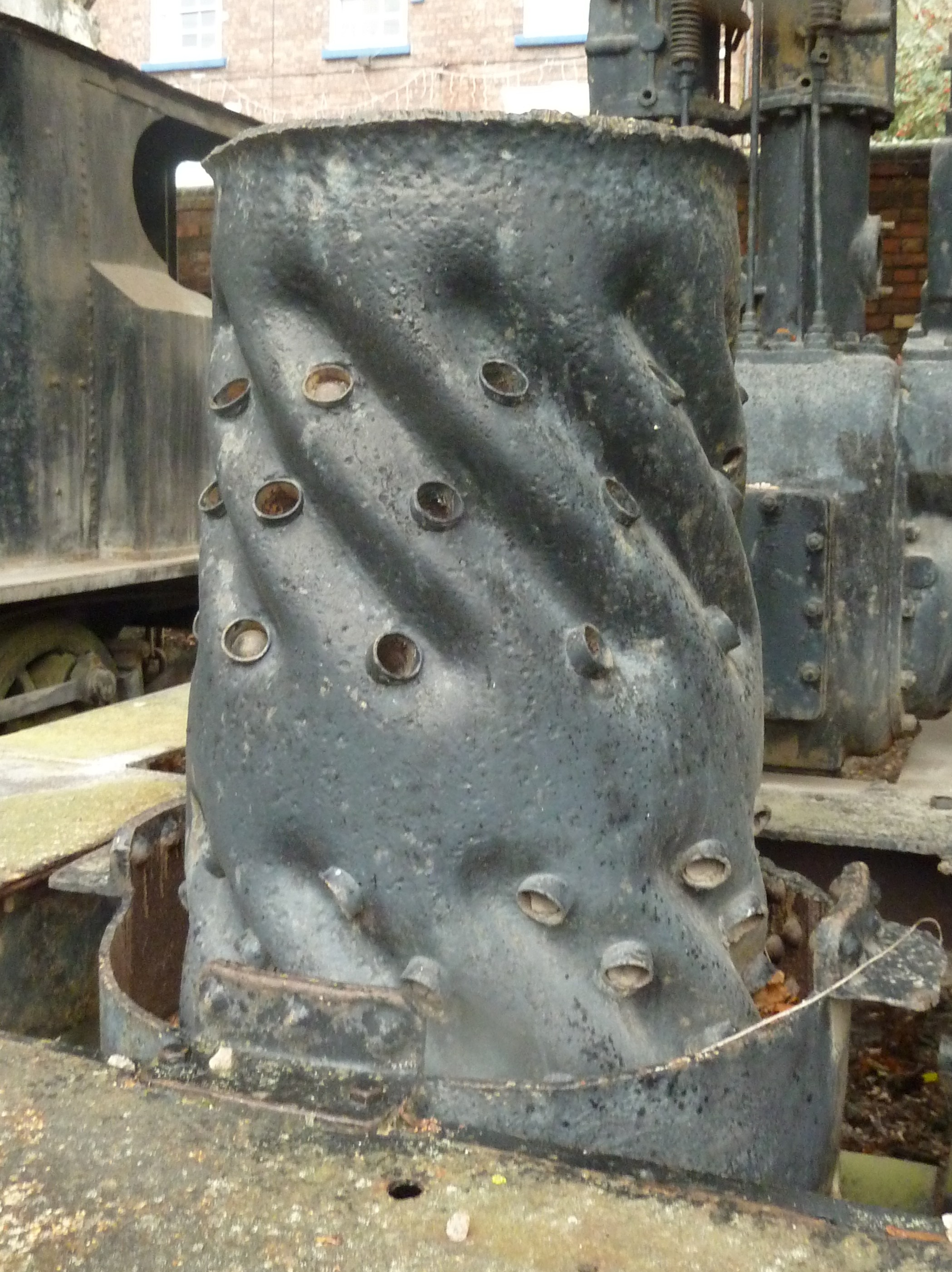
Inner firebox of the later spiral design

Sentinel's best-known flue design was the square-section, but at one time they also used a circular corrugated design, with the water-tubes arranged in a spiral. Manufacture of these was sub-contracted to the well-known boilermakers Galloway of Manchester. When Galloway closed in 1932, Sentinel switched back to their square pattern.

== Uses ==
=== Steam wagons ===
The boiler was used throughout Sentinel's range of steam wagons, from the earliest to the last. It was also used for their steam tractors, buses and other vehicles.

Mann's of Leeds used a derivation of the Sentinel boiler in their "Express" wagon, launched in 1924.

=== Railway locomotives ===
This particular boiler design was not widely used for Sentinel's railway locomotives. Narrow-gauge locomotives used it, as did the smaller standard gauge models.

- LNER Class Y1
- LNER railmotors

Their larger locomotives used a range of boiler designs, but all with water-tubes.

== See also ==
=== Comparable boiler designs ===
- Straker boiler

a direct precursor of the Sentinel

- Robertson boiler

a comparable fire-tube design

=== Other boiler designs used by Sentinel ===
- Sentinel-Doble boiler

Sentinel recruited the American steam car developer Abner Doble to develop an advanced monotube boiler for them.

- Woolnough boiler

a three-drum water-tube boiler used for their larger locomotives.

- locomotive boiler

used on the handful of overtype steam waggons built by Sentinel.
