= Abner Doble =

American inventor (1890–1961)

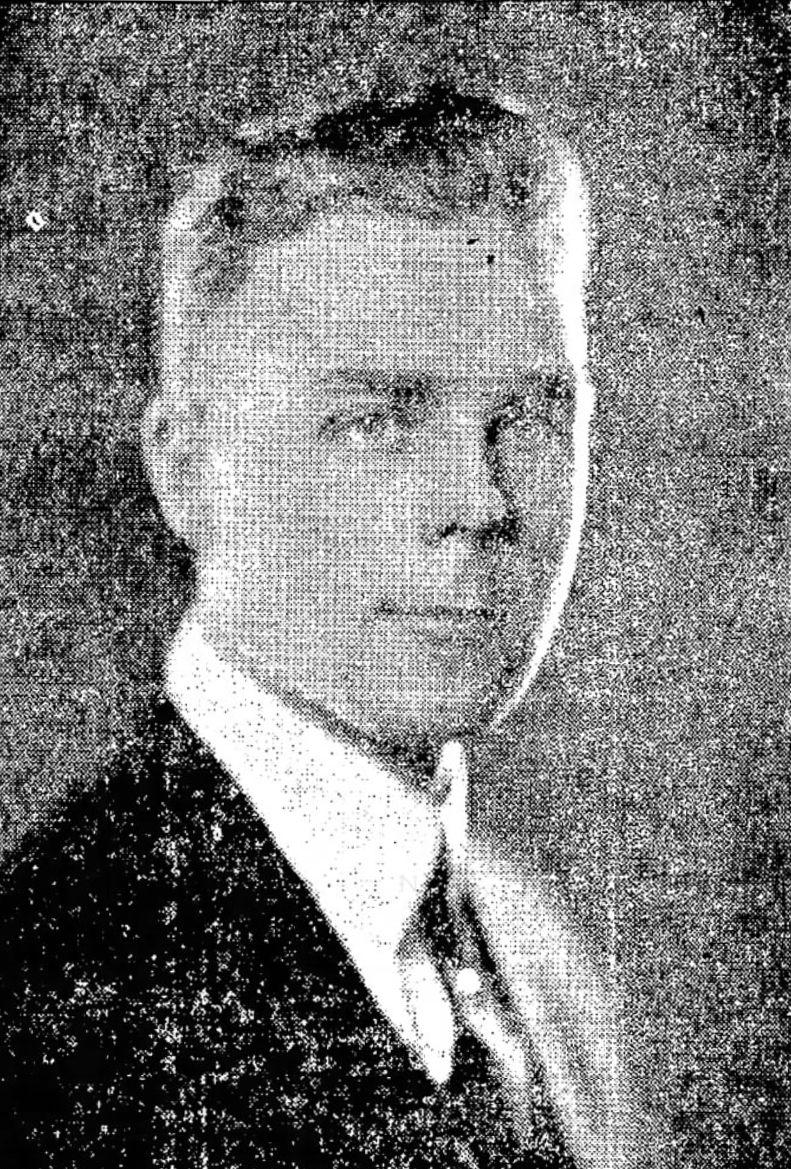
- Doble in 1922 newspaper
- Born: March 26, 1890; San Francisco, California, U.S.
- Died: July 16, 1961 (aged 71); Santa Rosa, California, U.S.
- Education: Massachusetts Institute of Technology
- Spouses: Helen A. Davis (m. 1910; div. 1926): Alene
- Children: 3

Abner Doble (March 26, 1890 – July 16, 1961) was an American mechanical engineer who built and sold steam-powered automobiles as Doble Steam Cars. His steam engine design was used in various automobiles from the early 1900s, a 1969 General Motors prototype, and the first successful steam-powered aeroplane.

== Family history ==
Doble was born on March 26, 1890, in San Francisco, one of four brothers. His father was William Ashton Doble, son of the inventor of the Doble water wheel. Doble's forebears had migrated from England to the US in the mid-1700s. William's father Abner was born in Indiana. He had been a sailor, a smith, and a lumberman, who became a journeyman blacksmith and subsequently became a partner in Nelson and Doble. The company became one of the biggest manufacturers of miner's and blacksmith's tools on the US Pacific coast during the California Gold Rush. The company became famous manufacturing Abner Doble's water wheel turbines for mining applications. The company expanded to make drays and street cars for San Francisco, as well as being involved in operating a local railroad company. In about 1892, Doble's grandfather formed the Abner Doble Company, assigning his interests to his sons Robert and William (Abner's father) and the company merged with arch-competitor and William stayed on.

== Early years ==
Doble apprenticed at his family's factory at the age of eight. Between 1906 and 1909, while attending high school, Ab and brothers John, Warren, and Bill built their first steam car in their parents' basement. It was composed of parts taken from a wrecked White steamer but reconfigured to be driven by an engine of their own design. Though it did not run well, the Doble brothers went on to build a second and third prototype in the following years.

In 1909 Abner graduated from high school and attended the Massachusetts Institute of Technology. He dropped out after less than a year of studies, and with his brother, began to design his own steam car. By 1912 they had built their first car in Waltham, Massachusetts. The car was based on an American Underslung chassis, their own engine and a Stanley Steamer boiler.

Waltham was near to the Stanley works and its factory at Watertown nearby. Abner attempted to interest the Stanley twins in his condensing boiler. However, Francis would not hire Doble because he didn't trust him. Although recognized as a steam genius, Abner was considered by some as arrogant and conceited and often told people he was a genius and therefore privileged to act so.

== Abner Doble Motor Vehicle Company, General Engineering, and Doble Steam Motors ==
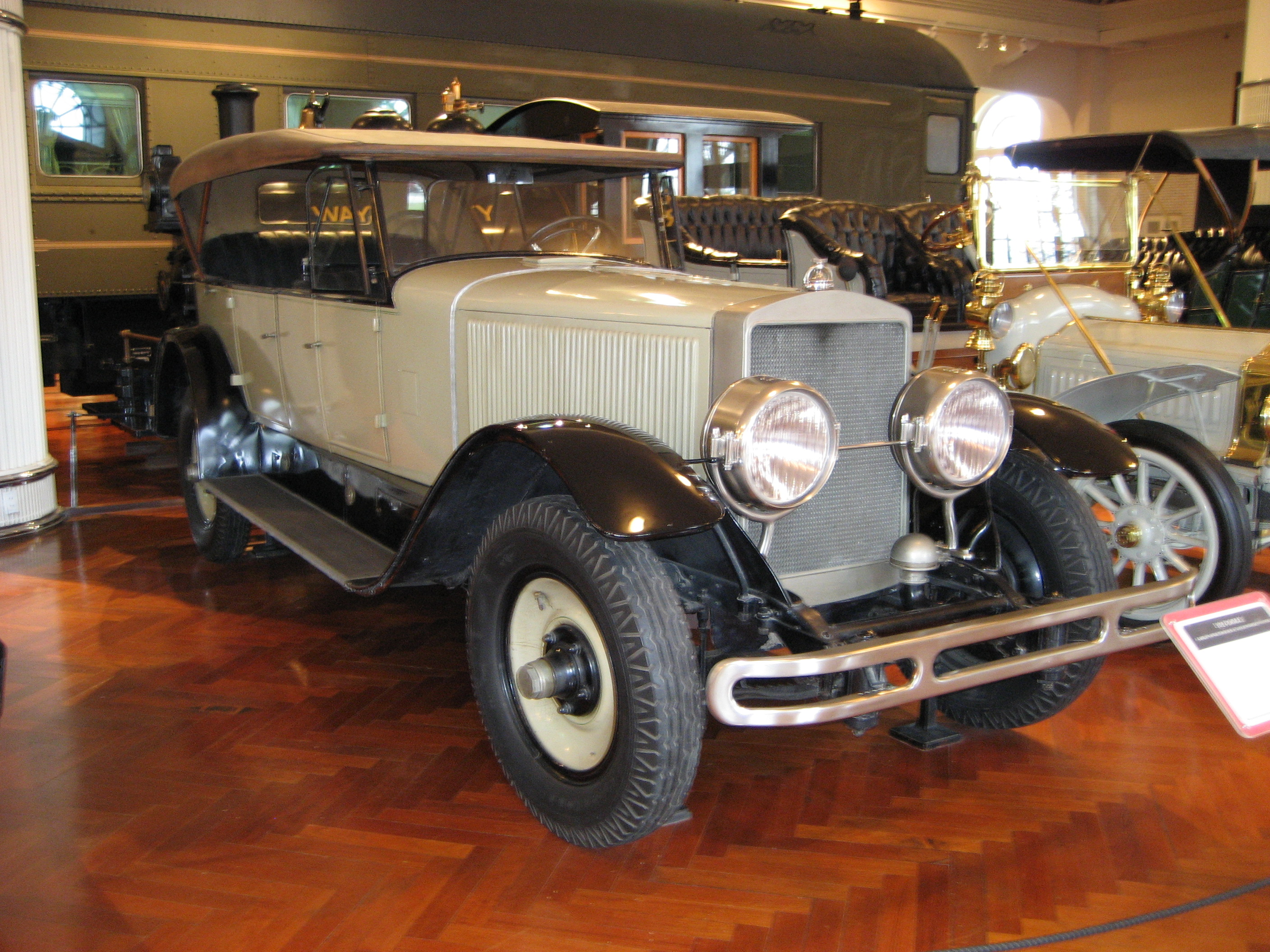
1924 Doble Model E at the Henry Ford Museum

Abner and his brother John formed their own company, the Abner Doble Motor Vehicle Company, in 1914. Their father provided financial support for the venture. The first car was the Model A. Up to five cars were thought to be made. Four were sold and one was kept for development. The cars were of good quality and appeared to have a good market.

In 1915, Doble drove his Model B, a revamped version of the Model A from Massachusetts to Detroit to seek investors. He managed to obtain $200,000, which he used to open the General Engineering Company with C L Lewis. In January 1917, Doble's new car, the Doble-Detroit, caused a sensation at the National Automobile Show in New York. Over 5,000 deposits were received for the car, with deliveries scheduled to begin in early 1918. The Dobles had not entirely worked out various design and manufacturing issues, and although the car received good notices and over 10,000 orders, about 11 were built. Doble blamed his company's production failure on the steel shortages caused by World War I, but the Doble Detroit was mechanically unsatisfactory.

Doble also announced at the New York show that he was working on a steam engine for aeroplanes.

The Doble brothers were divided by Doble's insistence on taking credit for the company's technical achievements, and John Doble ended up suing Doble for patent infringement, whereupon Doble left Detroit for California and the General Engineering Company folded. When John Doble died of lymphatic cancer in 1921 the surviving brothers reunited in Emeryville, California. They set up a company under the name of Doble Steam Motors.

In 1924 the State of California learned that Doble had helped to sell stock illegally in a desperate bid to raise money for the company, and though Doble was eventually acquitted in April 1928, the company failed during the ensuing legal struggle. Fewer than thirty of the Model E steam cars were produced before the company went out of business in April 1931, the F cars coming under Besler ownership. The total being reported variously as 24, 42, and 43. Doble himself owned E-24 from 1925 to 1936 as his own experimental car. He took it with him when on consulting work in New Zealand and England. He sold it in England to Mortimer Harman Lewis (editor of The Engineering and Boiler House Review) of Hyde Park, London, just before he departed for the US.

== Consultancy and later life ==
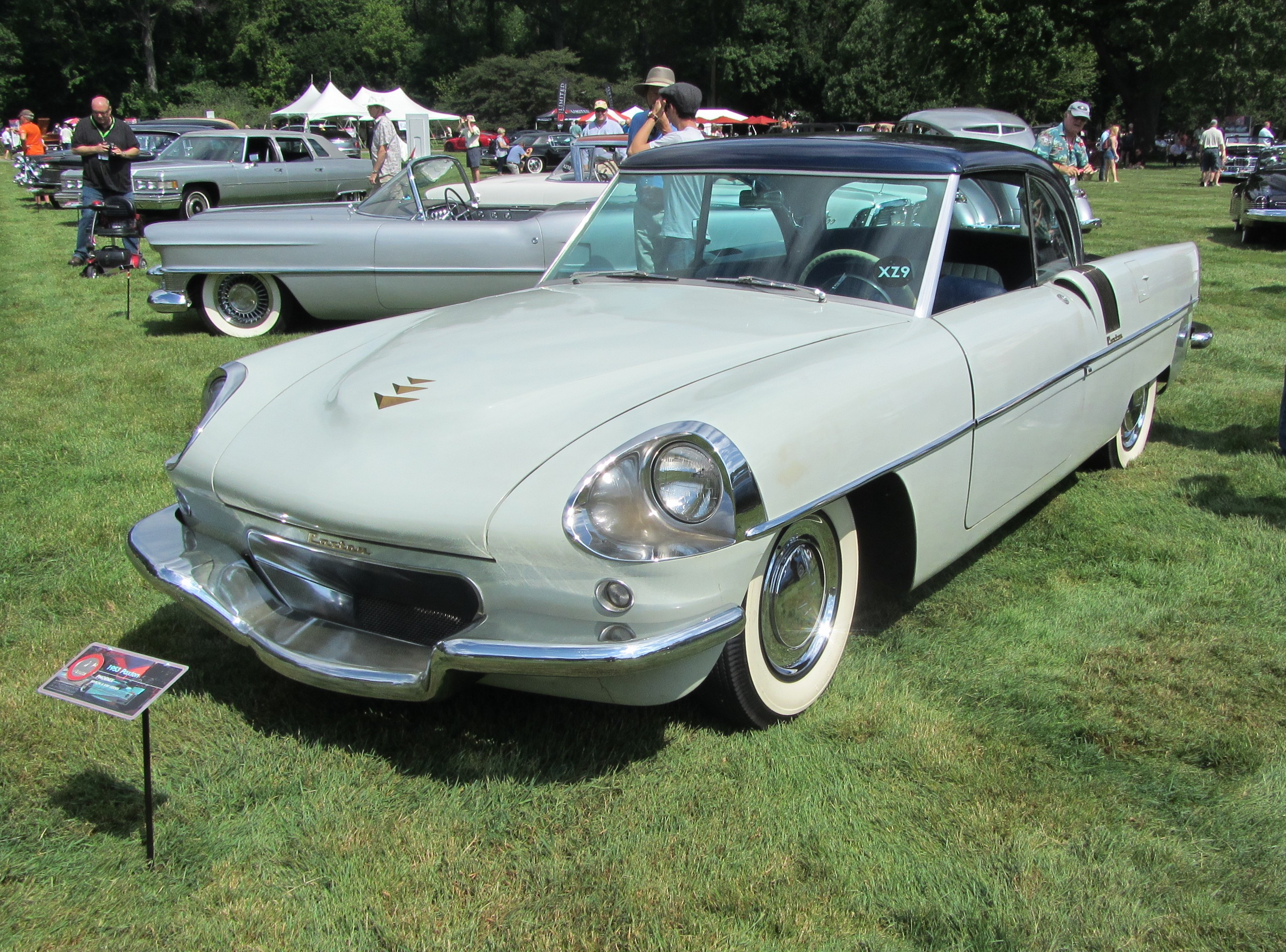
Paxton Phoenix

With the demise of their company, Abner and Warren went on to work as consultants for other engineering companies globally. During the 1920s and 1930s engines were developed for steam buses. The first were tested in 1926 by International Harvester, using a Doble Model G engine, and the Detroit Motorbus Co, in a double decker, with a Doble Model H engine. A second Detroit bus had a Doble steam engine added in 1927 and at least one of them covered some 32,000 miles (51,000 km). In 1929 a Doble Model H was installed in a Yellow Coach for General Motors. This was followed by another Model F in a Fageol bus.

He went to New Zealand in March 1930 where he worked under a three-year contract for A & G Price Limited at Thames on the development of a steam engine for buses. One was installed on an AEC chassis for the Auckland Transport Board to trial. The intention was that should the trial be successful more would be constructed. By 1932 the first had covered more than 20,000 miles (32,000 km) and a second was ordered by a private company, White and Sons, for their Auckland to Thames Service.

In January 1932 Doble left New Zealand and went via San Francisco to England. There he was loaned by Prices as a consultant to the Sentinel Waggon Works of Shrewsbury, working on steam lorries and locomotives. Several shunting locomotives (switchers) and an undetermined number of railcars were fitted with Doble/Sentinel machinery for sale to customers in Britain, France, Peru, and Paraguay. In Germany, during the 1930s Henschel & Sohn buses and trucks, powered by Doble designed steam engines, were operated. Abner Doble left England in 1936. Also during this time he acted as a consultant to Borsig Lokomotiv-Werke of Berlin.

Doble was hired as the chief engineer for a new bus powerplant for a revived Stanley Steam Motors Corporation in Chicago. In the middle of the project after the powerplant was actually built, Doble left to some annoyance. Doble then did engine designs for Cleaver-Brooks, Nordberg (1946–1948), and Greyhound. After this he retired to Santa Rosa, California, where he sold Electrolux vacuum cleaners to pay his living expenses.

Doble's consultancy also included in the development of the Paxton Phoenix car, for the Paxton Engineering Division of McCulloch Motors Corporation, Los Angeles. The project was for a low-weight car built around a unique "torque box" chassis similar to an aeronautical wing section. The project was eventually dropped in 1954. He did work on a design for a steam car for Alex Moulton of England, but it was never built. He was a consultant on the Keen steam car in 1957 and a monotube boiler for Charles W Tadlock of St Louis in 1957.

For the remainder of his life, he maintained that steam-powered automobiles were at least equal to gasoline cars, if not superior.

He was inducted into the Automotive Hall of Fame in 1972.

== Personal life ==
Doble married Helen A. Davis on February 28, 1910. They had three children, Lee, Dorothy and Abner Jr. They divorced in 1926. He married Alene.

Doble moved to Santa Rosa, California, in 1950. He died on July 16, 1961, of a heart attack, in Santa Rosa. He willed his body to the University of California at Berkeley.

== See also ==
- Doble steam car
