= Steam motor =

Steam engine for use on rail tracks

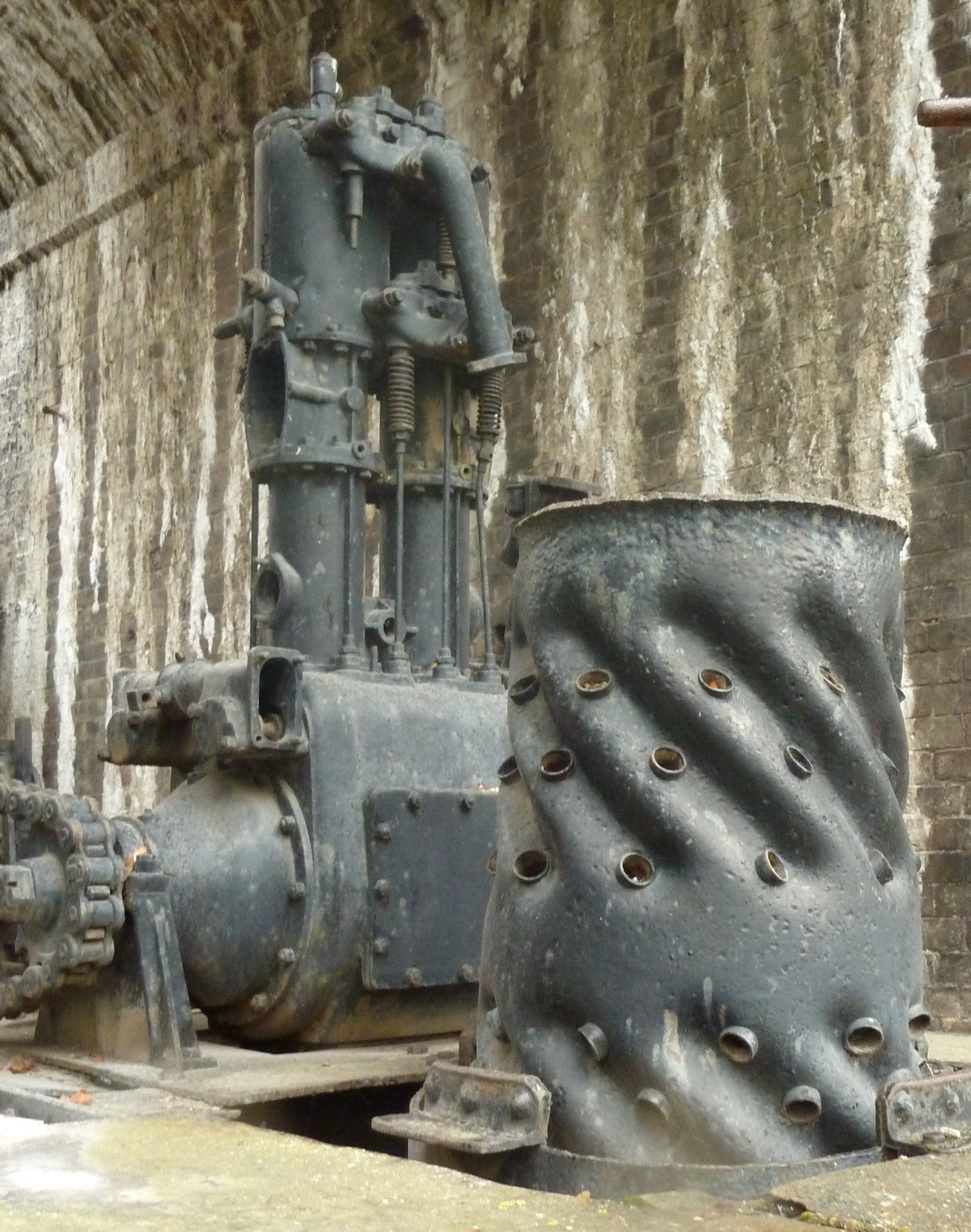
Sentinel two-cylinder vertical steam motor, with chain final drive just visible. The boiler in front is a partially dismantled Sentinel

A steam motor is a form of steam engine used for light locomotives and light self-propelled motor cars used on railways. The origins of steam motor cars for railways go back to at least the 1850s, if not earlier, as experimental economizations for railways or railroads with marginal budgets. These first examples, at least in North America, appear to have been fitted with light reciprocating engines, and either direct or geared drives, or geared-endless chain drives. Most incorporated a passenger carrying coach attached (usually rigidly) to the engine and its boiler. Boiler types varied in these earlier examples, with vertical boilers dominant in the first decade (as a space saver) and then with very small diameter horizontal boilers. Other examples of steam motor cars incorporated an express-baggage or luggage type car body, with coupling apparatus provided to allow the steam motor car to draw a light passenger coach.

An early example with the all-in-one (coach, baggage, mail and/or express matter compartments) was photographed working on the Nashville, Chattanooga & St. Louis Railroad during the American Civil War, in Tennessee, circa 1863-64. One American firm, Grice & Long, devised various versions in the mid-1860s for use on suburban and city street railways, using their proprietary mechanical patents. In the 1930s, some highly evolved steam motors represented one of the final developments of the steam locomotive. The concurrent development of internal combustion-powered or electric-motored railway motor cars proved most popular circa 1900-1950s and those obviating the need for steam-powered cars.

== Principles ==
All steam motor cars apparently depended on economical motive equipment and steam source. Ease of maintenance was apparently another important consideration, at least as much as initial manufacturing costs. The principle of the latest versions of the steam motor is to use the developments of the high-speed steam engine, and to apply them to light locomotives. Rather than a large conventional locomotive having only two (Note: A particularly large locomotive may have three or four cylinders, but any more is exceptional.) cylinders, moving at the speed of the driving wheels, the steam motor uses several small cylinders geared to run at high speeds. With all other factors remaining the same, doubling the speed of a piston engine doubles its power. The steam motor allowed small, light engines to be used. As many of the engine's performance losses remain constant, or are also related to the engine size, these small engines could also be more efficient overall.

=== Essential features ===
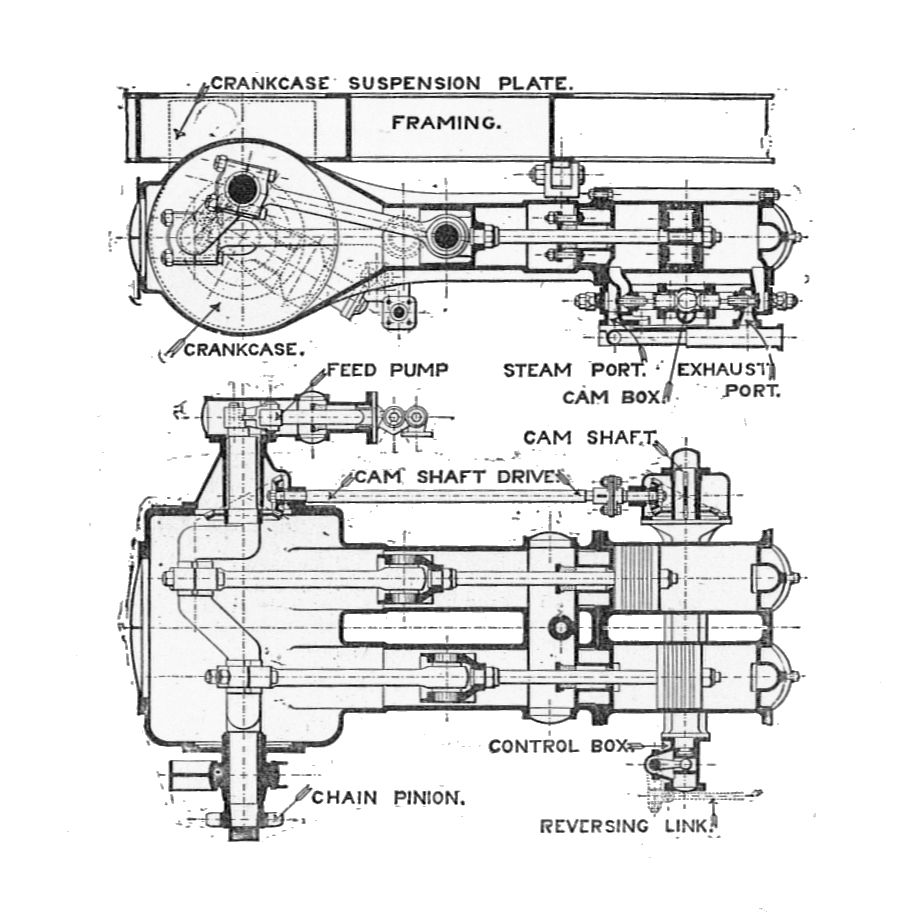
Sentinel steam waggon engine of 1905. This early Sentinel engine shows the same main principles that the engines would use over the next half-century

All steam motors had the following characteristics:

Small size

Late model motors were of a standard size, according to the manufacturer's product line. Where greater power was required, multiple motors were used, one per axle or bogie.

Enclosed crankshaft lubrication

In the most modern form of steam motors, the crankshaft and often the valve gear, was enclosed within a crankcase that contained an oil sump. This provided a generous supply of lubrication and also excluded dirt. Much earlier examples, e.g. mid-19th century, employed all manner of mechanisms with manual lubrication through small drip cups.

Geared drive

This allows a high crankshaft speed, encouraging efficiency. Although not all geared steam locomotives made use of this, particularly the US designs such as the Shay and the Climax, it was an essential part of the most modern steam motor concept.

The final drive of early Sentinel-patent locomotives was by chain. Later designs, particularly those by Abner Doble, preferred spur gears. Gear drives required the steam motor to be mounted low-down, alongside the axle. Geared drives appear in some of the earliest steam motor cars used in North America, although more conventional reciprocating drives with either a single power axle or doubled power axles, linked by connecting rods, were quite common. Most of these used conventional Stephenson motion valve gear.

=== Additional features ===
Fuel and water consumption savings was one more important consideration in most steam motor cars used around the world. The less overall cost in operation was of great importance to buyers. Fuel could be coal, and in some fewer cases, oil of various types.

Advanced valve gear

Late-manufacture steam motors were usually fitted with poppet valves driven by camshafts. In the steam motors built by Sentinel, the motor was derived from their already advanced steam wagon design.

Small driving wheels

In a conventional steam locomotive, the 'gear ratio' is set by the size of the driving wheels. In steam motors using a geared drive, the wheel size can be reduced. This makes for a lighter and more compact chassis, particularly by reducing the unsprung weight of large wheels. Small wheels also allow the motor to be mounted on a bogie within a passenger coach to form a railcar, rather than the large wheels being the size of a locomotive.

=== Advantages ===
These features give advantages:

Higher efficiency

This is mostly owing to the high speed of the latter-day modern engines and the reduction gearing, but also their other advanced design features.

Reduced servicing

The use of oil-bath lubrication reduces the time spent in daily oiling.

Reduced maintenance

The use of oil-bath lubrication reduces the rate of wear, thus reducing the need for periodic maintenance. This is mostly due to the exclusion of dirt, as well as the generous and reliable lubrication. Although other oil-bath systems on steam locomotives, such as the Bulleid chain-driven valve gear, gained a poor reputation for reliability, this was mostly due to the difficulty of sealing such a large container. With the steam motor, only the motor's relatively small crankcase was a sealed box.

Simpler maintenance

Maintenance, when required, involves smaller components. These are easier to work on, requiring less specialised lifting gear. The motor may also easily be removed in one piece for maintenance, either on-shed, or by return to the manufacturer. This also allows a vehicle to be returned to service more quickly by swapping motor units.

Low manufacturing cost

Components are manufactured in greater volume, as many designs of locomotive may be built around standardised motor designs. The machinery required to manufacture steam motors is also smaller, thus less specialised and cheaper.

Reduced hammer blow

The smoother drive of the geared motor, and its multiple cylinders, reduced the dynamic effect of individual cylinder strokes.

Articulation

With multiple motors, there is no need for a single large frame to carry all of the driven wheels. This was an attractive feature for the Colombian locomotives, where a powerful locomotive was provided on a flexible chassis.

As the driving wheels were small and articulated, there was no need for separate carrying axles. All wheels could be powered, so that the locomotive's entire weight could be used for adhesion.

== Development ==
=== Ganz Works, Hungary ===
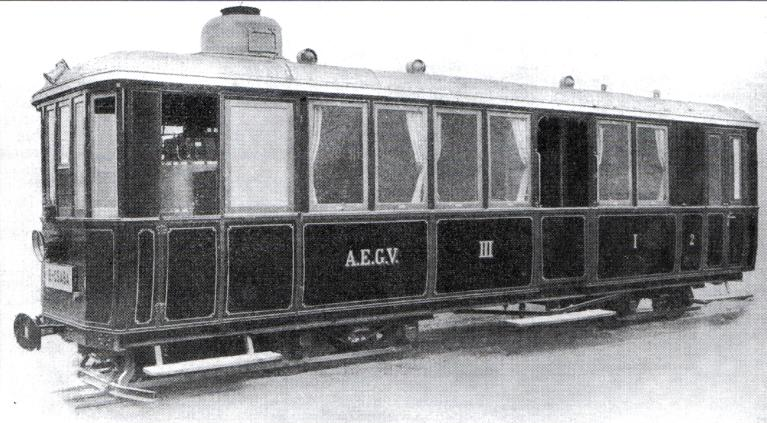
The first steam railcar built by Ganz and de Dion-Bouton

Between 1901 and 1908, Ganz Works of Budapest and de Dion-Bouton of Paris collaborated to build a number of railcars for the Hungarian State Railways together with units with de Dion-Bouton boilers, Ganz steam motors and equipments, and Raba carriages built by the Raba Hungarian Wagon and Machine Factory in Győr. In 1908, the Borzsavölgyi Gazdasági Vasút (BGV), a narrow-gauge railway in Carpathian Ruthenia (today's Ukraine), purchased five railcars from Ganz and four railcars from the Hungarian Royal State Railway Machine Factory with de Dion-Bouton boilers. The Ganz company started to export steam motor railcars to the United Kingdom, Italy, Canada, Japan, Russia and Bulgaria.

=== Paget locomotive ===
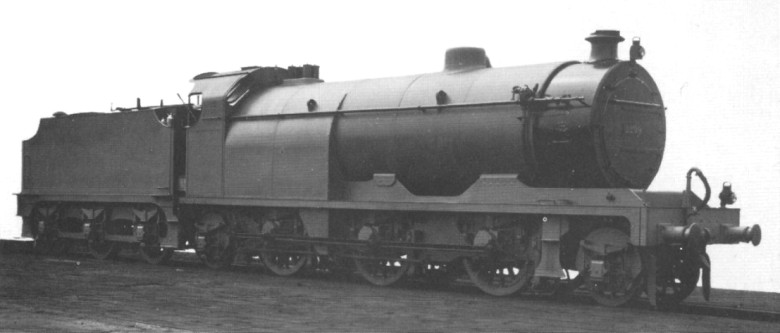
The Paget locomotive

The first multiple-cylinder locomotive to demonstrate some of the principles of the steam motor was the Midland Railway's Paget locomotive of 1907. This was one of many attempts to build a balanced locomotive, so avoiding the problems of hammer blow. It also followed contemporary advanced stationary engine practice in using single-acting cylinders. The locomotive has been variously described as either inspired by, or actually using, the design of the Willans engine that represented the peak of steam engine design at this time. In fact, the rotary valves used for the locomotive were entirely different from the Willans' characteristic central valve spindle, even though they did both use single-acting trunk pistons. Eight cylinders were used, two driving the front axle of the three driving axles, four the middle axle and two the rear axle. All three axles were coupled by external coupling rods. The central axle was a complicated forging as a four-throw internal crank axle, although following traditional Stephenson practice. To provide additional space for the cylinders, the locomotive was outside framed.

A significant difference between the Paget and a steam motor locomotive is that the Paget valvegear was driven centrally, every cylinder's valve being driven by geared shafts from a single jackshaft that was in-turn driven by the coupling rods.

Although the locomotive achieved its goal of avoiding vibration and hammer blow, and its novel boiler and firebrick firebox was also simple and reliable, it was not considered an overall success. The rotary valvegear absorbed more power to drive it than a conventional design and suffered from problems with thermal expansion. After a mechanical failure of the valvegear seizing and blocked a main line for several hours, the locomotive was withdrawn and later scrapped.

=== Sentinel ===
The first locomotives designed around the full steam motor concept were by Sentinel. In 1922 two separate Sentinel-based steam motor projects were put forward. The first, in May 1922, was Sentinel's own concept for a light steam railmotor based on their steam wagon boiler and engine. No railmotors were built to this pattern, although a pair of similar 'rail lorries' were later built for export to India.

In the same year, Kyrle Willans (Note: Kyrle Willans, son of Peter W. Willans inventor of the Willans engine, was also the uncle of L.T.C. Rolt.) suggested that a worn-out conventional locomotive, a Manning-Wardle named Ancoats, could be rebuilt with the boiler and engine of a Sentinel steam wagon in the locomotive's frames, connected by a roller chain drive. This was the first steam locomotive, and the first example of the steam motor for railway use, to be constructed by Sentinel. Although Sentinel were to become known for gear-driven locomotives, other examples of this conversion of an older coupling rod locomotive continued to be produced; two examples survive, although derelict, at the Coalbrookdale Museum of Iron.

Sentinel's first new-construction locomotive, Nº 5156, was built in July 1923. Like the railmotor design, this used the newly developed engine of the Super-Sentinel wagon, placed horizontally between the frames. This was of 750 mm (2 ft 5 1/2 in) gauge, establishing a precedent for Sentinel of building locomotives across a range of gauges by simply changing the axles and bearings under a standard chassis. The boiler used was also the new Super-Sentinel pattern at 230 psi, with the 'spiral' firebox.

Production Sentinels achieved a more accessible layout by mounting their engines vertically. The smaller 'Balanced Engine' design (Note: See LMS Sentinel 7164) had the boiler and engine at opposite ends of the frames, with low bodywork over the water tank, a raised cab and a small cylindrical casing over the engine. (Note: Owing to its shape, this is commonly misidentified as the boiler.) The more familiar type was the later 'Central Engine' that placed the engine centrally within a large box-shaped cab. These CE engines were later increased in power by slightly enlarging the boiler and raising boiler pressure to 275 psi. This increased their power from the original 80 bhp of the BE locomotives to 100 bhp. All of these locomotives were of 0-4-0T wheel arrangement, with both axles driven by chains from the same engine. To give greater power, Sentinel patented the concept of using multiple, identical steam motors, each driving one axle. These were the 'Double Engine' locomotives of 200 bhp. The boiler was enlarged again and was fitted unusually with two chimneys, one for the blastpipe of each engine.

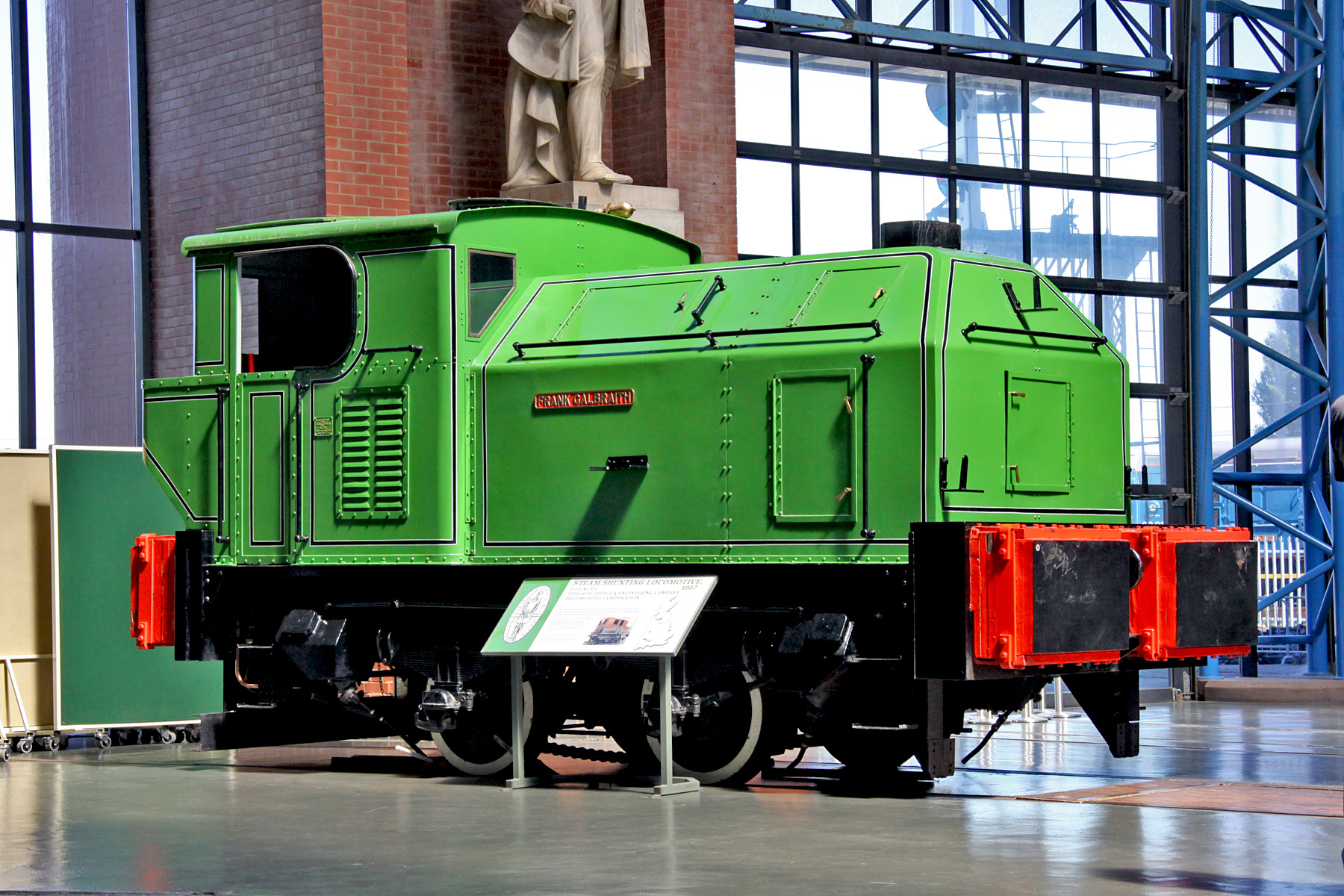
Sentinel chain-drive shunter of 1957

The gear ratio of the final drive depended on the market and the work expected of the locomotive. They varied between a 6:1 and a 1:1 drive. The original steam wagon, using an engine of the same size, might carry a load of around 15 tons. The railway locomotive might achieve a tractive effort of 123,000 lbf and haul a load for slow shunting work of 650 tons. Typical shunting loads were around 350 tons at 5 mph in a level marshalling yard, the weight of a typical goods train.

By 1925 the vertical arrangement of the engine had been taken advantage of to improve steam porting and access for maintenance. The Super-Sentinel engine used two camshafts: inlet and exhaust, placed near the crankshaft in the crankcase and operating the poppet valves through long pushrods. In the original wagon engine, all four valves were mounted at the far end of the cylinder from the crankshaft, requiring long narrow ports to the other end of the cylinder. With the locomotives the easily accessed vertical engine allowed a pair of these valves to be moved to the lower end of the cylinder, allowing for a short, efficient port with less 'dead space'. The crankcase of the engine, together with the crosshead trunk guide, was enclosed and provided with oil splash lubrication. A small plenum was left exposed between the cylinder's piston rod stuffing box and another gland seal into the crankcase. This allowed any steam that did leak past the seals to be vented to the atmosphere, rather than condensing within the crankcase.

==== Railcars ====
Following closely on their locomotive developments, Sentinel also produced steam railcars. These were convenient for lightly constructed railways as they were much lighter than conventional locomotive-hauled trains. Even compared to earlier steam railmotors, such as the GWR vertical-boilered examples, the Sentinel design of a lightweight water-tube boiler and a smaller geared steam motor was yet lighter. Petrol railcars and railbuses were appearing by this time, although they were limited in power and so weight, size and carrying capacity. Sentinel's main market for their railcars was for export, although the LNER also operated a number of them.

=== Doble ===
The steam motor principle owes much to the work and advocacy of Abner Doble, who was inspired by his earlier work on steam cars. He later worked for Henschel of Germany who built trucks, buses, railcars and even locomotives using his steam motor principle.

Doble also designed for Sentinel, particularly for the development of advanced boiler designs.

== Other examples ==
=== France ===
221TQ

Rebuilt from a 230 class 4-6-0T tank locomotive as a 4-4-2T, with a longitudinal V12 steam motor driving the two driven axles through a driveshaft. This did not follow the usual steam motor practice, in that the entire drive from many cylinders was still united in a single shaft, although it did still use the concept of small cylinders and reduction gearing. The locomotive appears to have been unsatisfactory, possibly because the weight of the motor was now over the leading carrying wheels, reducing adhesive weight over the drivers to only half of the locomotive's total.

232.P.1

A 4-6-4 streamlined express passenger locomotive, using a high-pressure boiler. Each of the three driven axles had a pair of three-cylinder double-acting uniflow steam motors, giving 18 cylinders in total.

=== Switzerland ===
High Pressure Locomotive

A 2-6-2 high-pressure locomotive of 1927, designed by Buchli. This used a three-cylinder motor to drive the wheels through a 1:2.5 reduction gearbox, then conventional coupling rods. This motor had poppet valves and uniflow admission.

=== Germany ===
Lübeck-Büchener Eisenbahn

The Lübeck-Büchener Eisenbahn ordered railcars from Henschel according to the designs of Abner Doble. Similar railcars were also built for Deutsche Reichsbahn. In 1936–1937 these were followed by a 2-6-4T locomotive using three V-twin steam motors.

V19.1001

The German streamlined express passenger locomotive V19.1001 of the late 1930s. This 2-8-2 or 1'Do1' (UIC) locomotive had four V-twin steam motors, one on each axle.

=== Egypt ===
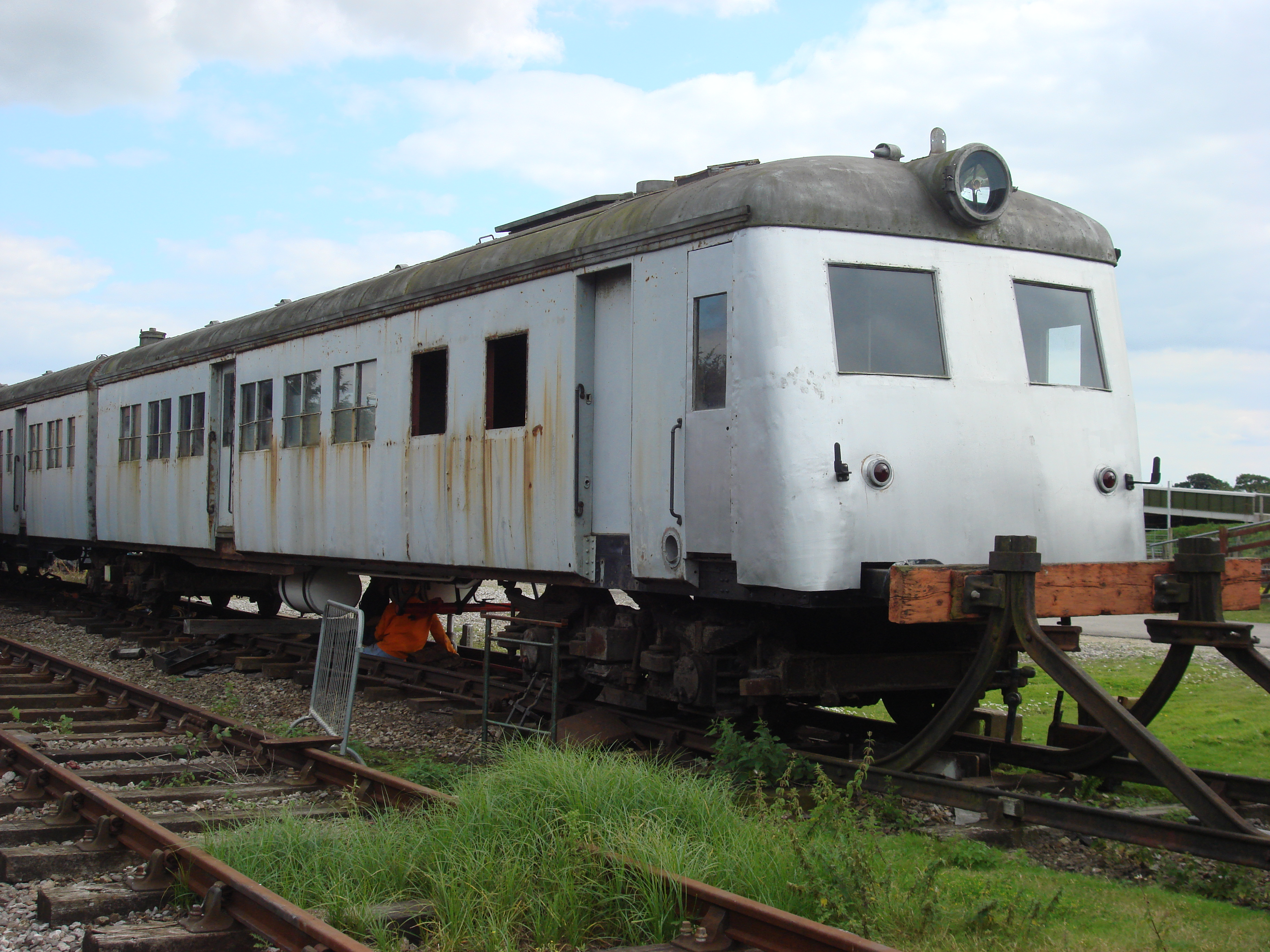
Egyptian Sentinel-Cammell railcar of 1951

Steam motor locomotive of 1938

This was an outside-framed 2-4-2, with two Sentinel steam motors, each of 200 bhp. Unusually for Sentinel, it used a conventional locomotive boiler.

In 1951 Egyptian National Railways bought some of the last Sentinel steam railcars, built by Metropolitan-Cammell with Sentinel power bogies. These were ten three-carriage rakes articulated across four Jakobs bogies. One is preserved in England today, by the Quainton Railway Society at the Buckinghamshire Railway Centre, England.

=== South America ===
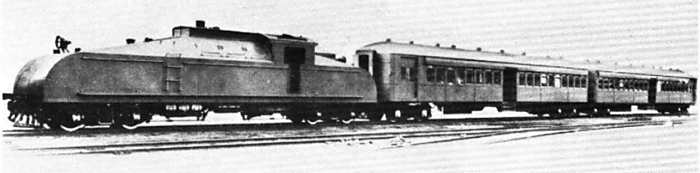
Argentinian steam motor set for the Buenos Aires Midland Railway

Sentinel built a number of metre gauge locomotives for Argentina, Colombia and also Belgium.

The first of these were in 1931, for the Buenos Aires Midland Railway. The railway was already using Sentinel railcars similar to the LNER pattern, but required a larger multiple unit. Two were built as four-unit rakes: a locomotive based on the previous railcar chassis and three trailer coaches. The B-B locomotive used two four wheel bogies, each driven by a six-cylinder motor based on the railcar, for a total of 250 bhp. The boiler was relatively high pressure, although typical for Sentinel, using a Woolnough water-tube boiler of 300 psi.

One of the best-known Sentinel locomotives was the 'Colombian', based on the designs of Abner Doble. These were built as a batch of four, the first of which was sold to Belgium in 1934, followed by three for the Société National des Chemins de Fer en Colombe. At least one of the Colombian locomotives was tested in Belgium, where most surviving photographs of it were taken. Some reports state that the Belgian locomotive was also later shipped to Colombia.

These locomotives have been described as the most sophisticated steam locomotives ever constructed, certainly the most advanced that Sentinel produced. They used a high-pressure Woolnough boiler at 550 psi. The chassis layout was a Co-Co, with each axle independently driven by a two-cylinder compound Doble steam motor. This motor was also used in other Sentinel railcar designs for the Southern Railway. An unusual feature for reliability was that if any motor failed, it could rapidly be disconnected and the locomotive continued on its way.

=== North America ===
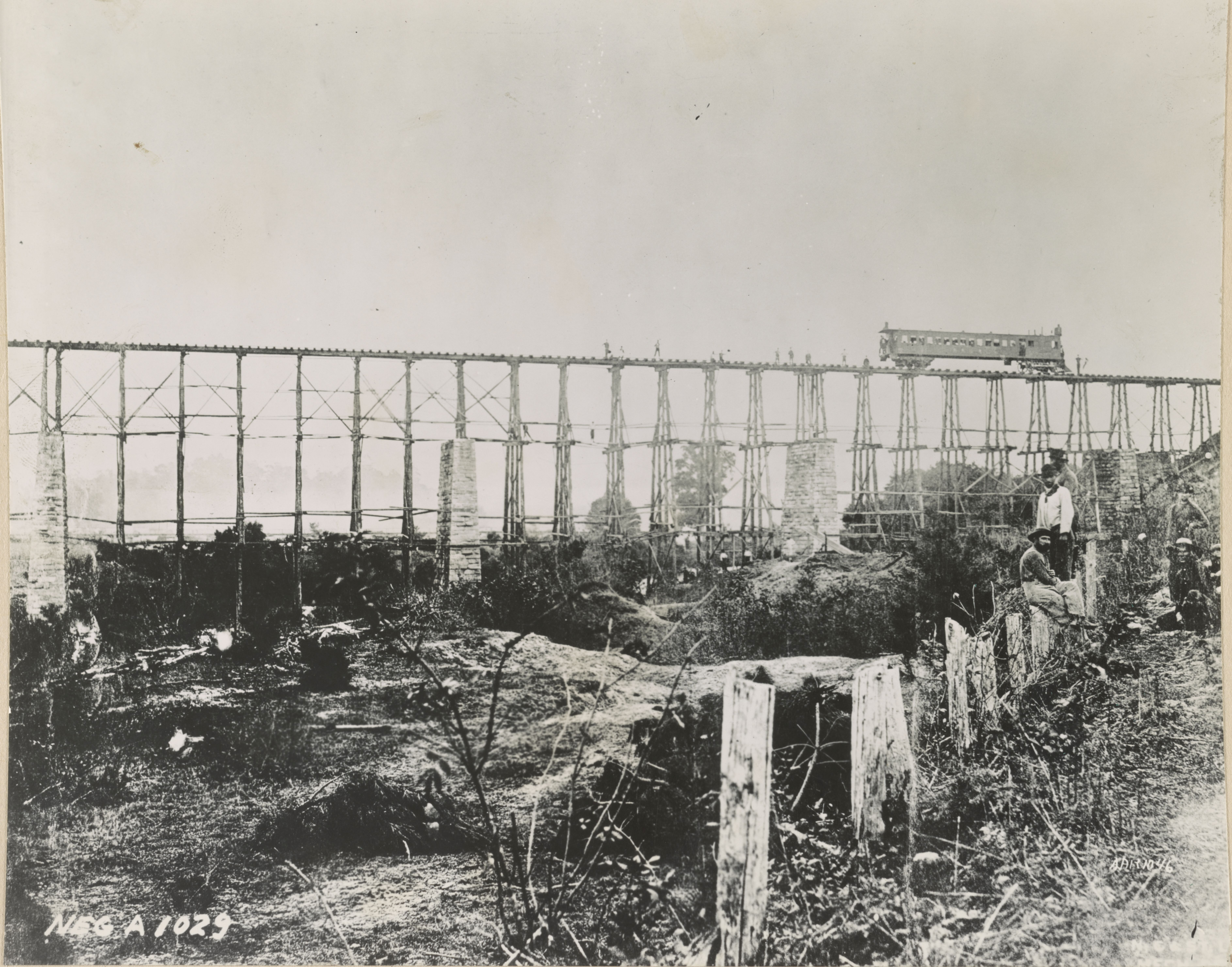

The steam motor cars of North America reached their popular apex before the 1880s, with most fabricated to custom designs by small specialty builders before 1875. Nearly all examples were unique and purpose-built to order; a few were experimental cars built and marketed by small firms or individuals on a trial basis and often not entirely successful due to their uniqueness or relative costs. The rise of electric traction was one cause for the ultimate demise of American steam motor cars. The development of direct-drive gasoline mechanical railway motor cars circa 1905-15 created new markets, and finally gas-electric and then diesel-hydraulic drive motor cars such as the widely popular Budd RDC [rail diesel car] of the 1950s closed out the need for self-contained motor trains. The Baltimore and Ohio considered (but never built) a fleet of powerful 5,000 hp 4-2-2-2-2-4 express locomotives in the late 1930s, powered by four V4 motors, one per axle.
