= High-speed steam engine =

Steam engine designed to run at comparatively high speed

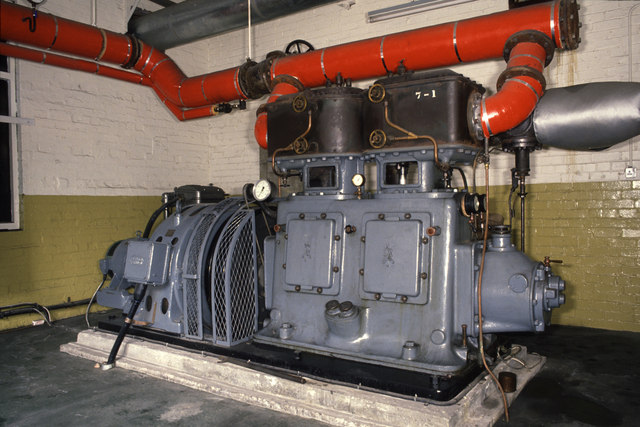
Late Ashworth and Parker generating set, installed in 1988

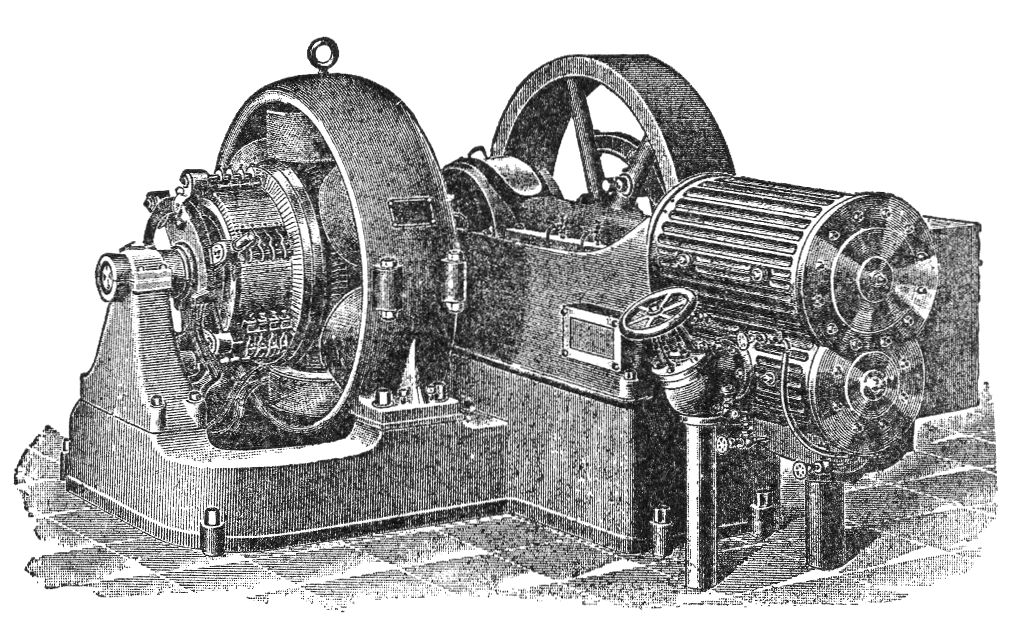
Early horizontal engine with direct-coupled dynamo

High-speed steam engines were one of the final developments of the stationary steam engine. They ran at a high speed, of several hundred rpm, which was needed by tasks such as electricity generation.

== Defining characteristics ==
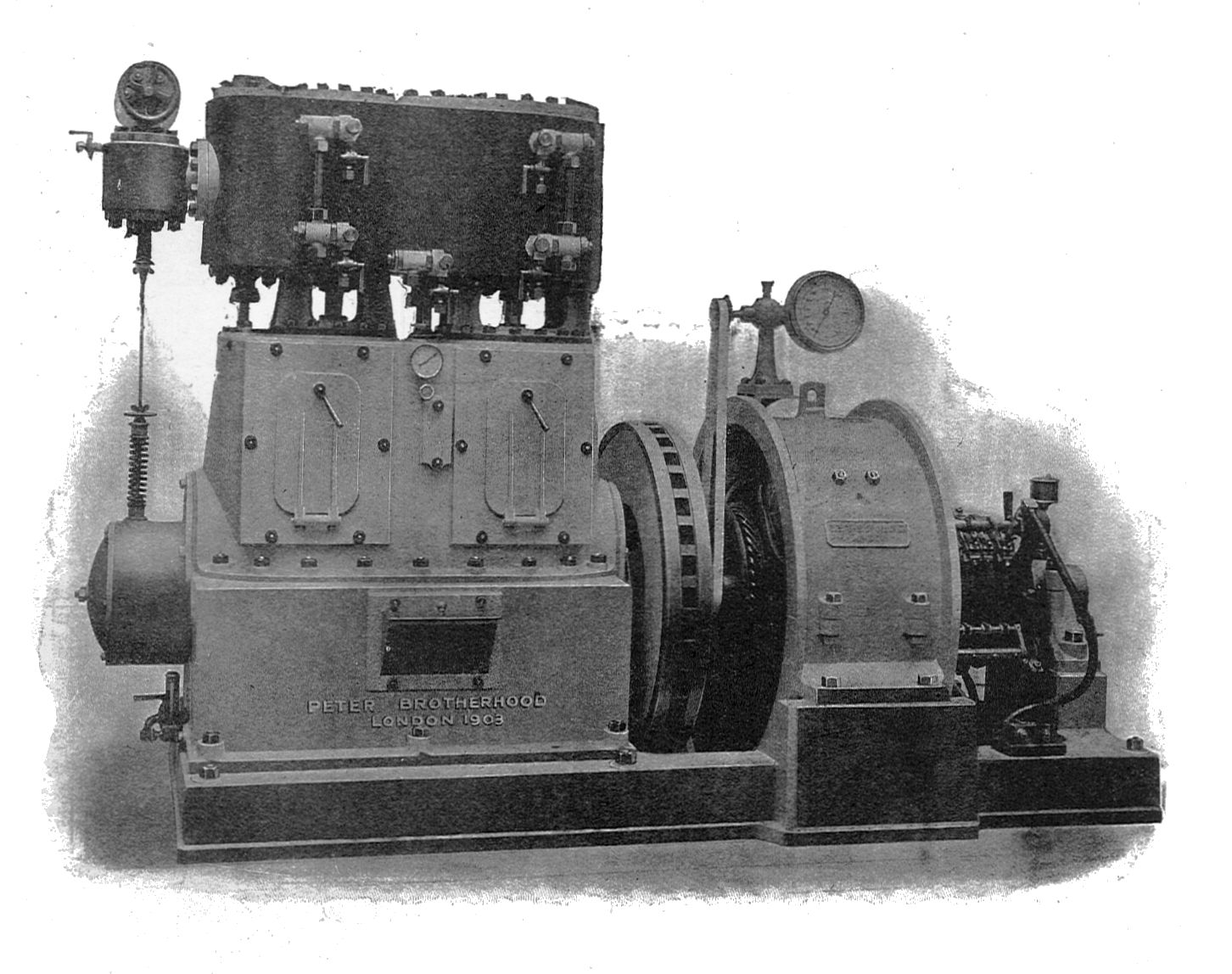
Peter Brotherhood engine around 1900, supplied to the Royal Navy for on-board generation

They have two primary characteristics:

- High speed.

This is sufficient to drive a small dynamo directly, rather than needing a step-up drive by belts.

- Accurate speed regulation.

Generation by dynamo requires a stable rotation speed for a stable output voltage, even when the load changes. When an alternator was being driven, the output frequency also depended upon a stable rotation speed.

These also resulted in a number of secondary characteristics. Although these were not defining to the type, or were always the case, they were recognisably common:

- Improved lubrication, as required by their high speed.

This often used an enclosed crankcase with an oil sump and lubrication by 'splash' or by ring oilers. Some went so far as to have engine-driven oil pumps and a circulation system.

- Small, rigid cast iron frames, so that they did not require the large stationary engine's usual complex masonry foundations.
- Single-acting cylinders.

As the crankcase became more important for lubrication, the layout was simpler if steam pressure was only applied to one side of the cylinder. This has a second advantage: as the steam's force is now only on one side of the piston, the force on the bearings will still vary through the stroke, but it no longer reverses its direction. (Note: The same consistent force direction is a feature of the two-stroke internal combustion engine, although not of the four-stroke.) This reduces the effects of any bearing slop at high speed.

High speed was not needed for electrical power generation in the largest citywide plants. (Note: The first of these plants were produced for either streetlighting or electric tramways, some years before domestic electric supply became popular.) As these plants were necessarily large, they could also use large-diameter dynamos with many pole pieces. This gave the necessary linear speed (in poles passed / time) for a lower rotational shaft speed.

These engines were produced with either simple or compound operating cycles. Smaller examples were usually simple, as the difficulties of achieving good regulation outweighed the efficiencies of compounding. High-speed engines did develop a reputation for profligacy. For larger engines the fuel cost savings were worthwhile and compound designs such as the Willans engine were used.

They also used a wide range of valves. Examples with either slide or piston valves were common. Multi-cylinder single-acting engines typically shared one piston valve between two cylinders, either between the cylinders or horizontally above them.

The valvegear driving these valves was usually simple, a single eccentric designed only to run at one speed, in one direction, for a fairly constant load. Although these engines were contemporaneous with sophisticated and efficient valvegears such as the Corliss, these trip valves were incapable of working quickly enough.

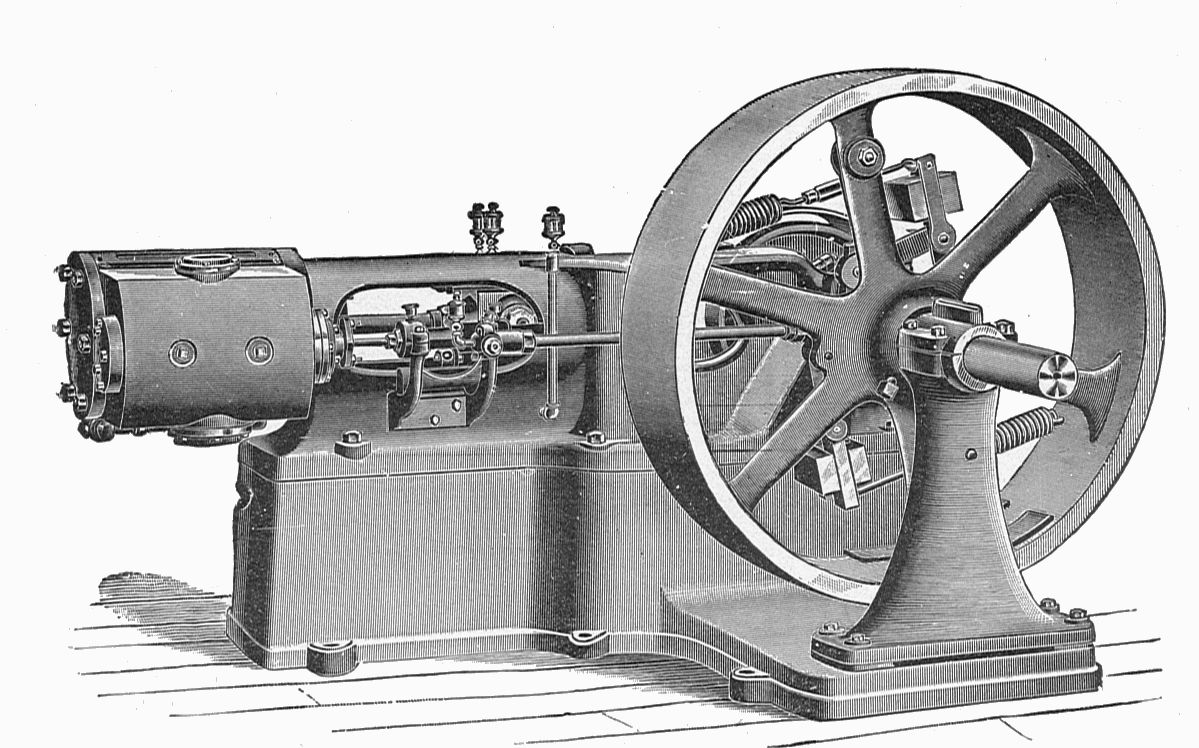
Typical horizontal engine, showing the compact frame

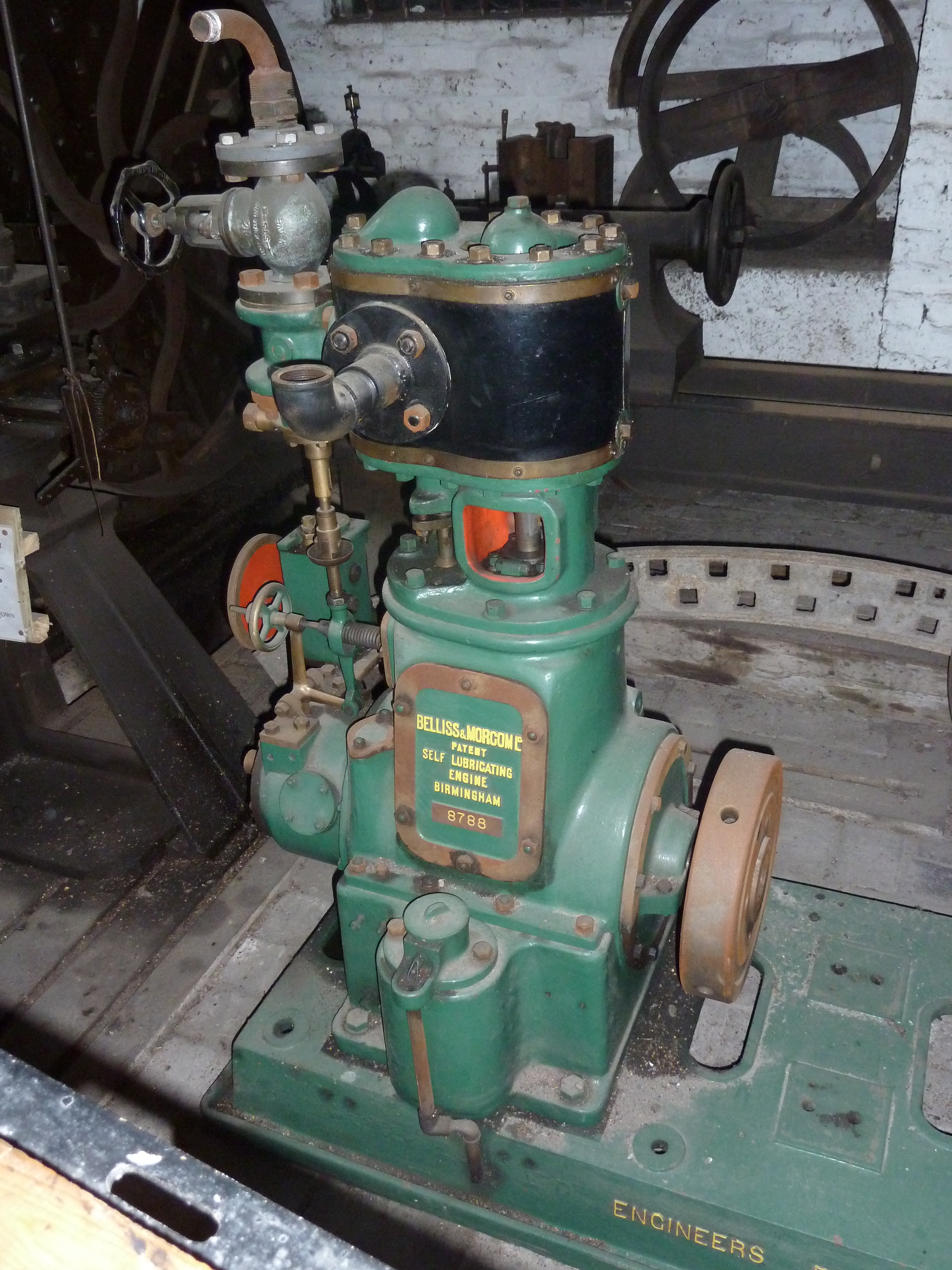
Belliss & Morcom single cylinder engine

== "Automatic" engines ==
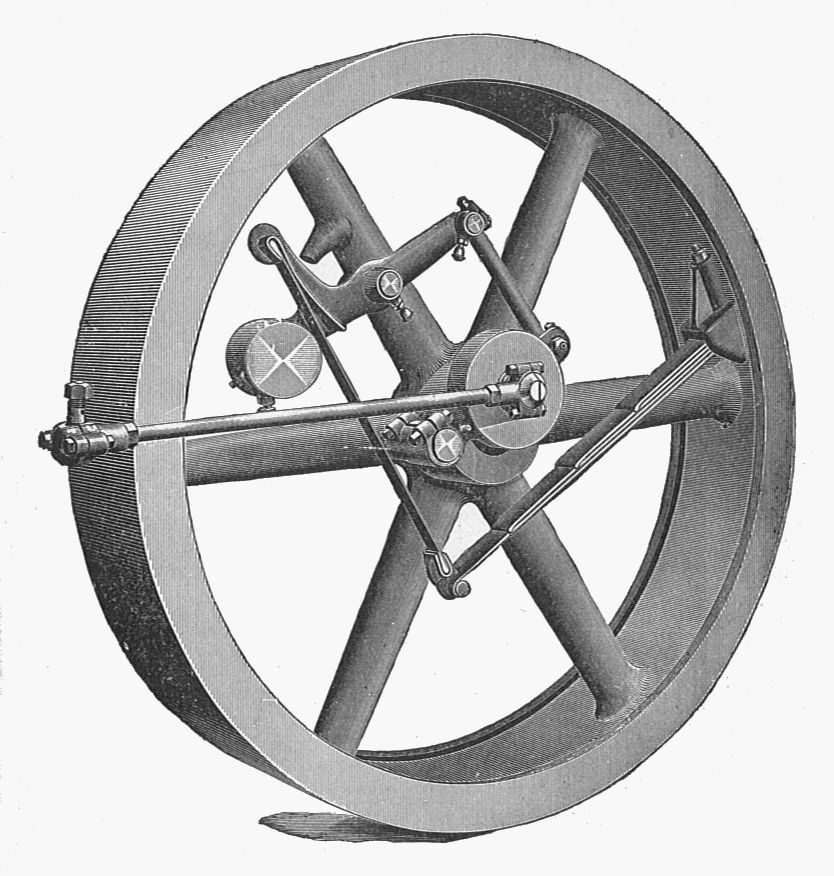
Ames automatic governor, with centrifugal bob-weight and leaf spring

A key requirement for the high-speed steam engine was accurate control of a constant speed, even under a rapidly changing load. Although the control of steam engines via a centrifugal governor dates back to Watt, this control was inadequate. These early governors operated a throttle valve to control the flow of steam to the engine. This gives an inadequately responsive control for the constant speed needed for electricity generation.

The solution developed for high-speed steam engines was the "automatic" governor. Rather than controlling the flow rate of steam, it controlled the timing or 'cut-off' of the inlet valves. This governor was interspersed between the crankshaft and the eccentric driving the valve gear. It was often made as part of the engine's flywheel. A centrifugal bob weight in the governor moved out against a spring with increasing speed. This caused the eccentric's position to shift relative to the crank, changing the valve timing and causing an early cut-off. As this control acted directly at the cylinder port, rather than through a long pipe from a throttle valve, it could be very fast-acting.

== Lubrication ==
=== Enclosed crankcase splash lubrication ===
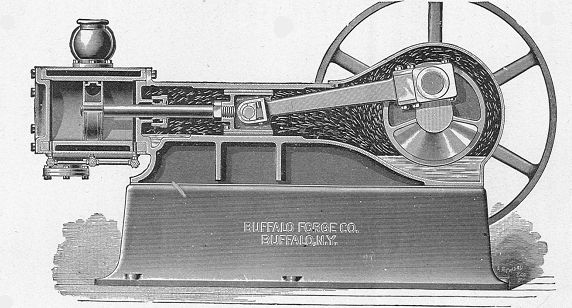
Section of an enclosed engine, with oil splash lubrication

Lubrication of the first high-speed engines, such as the Ideal (an open-crank horizontal engine), were lubricated by a development of the oil cup systems previously widespread on medium-speed stationary engines. Oil cups and multi-point lubricators could oil shaft bearings well enough and a single sight-glass could be observed by the engine driver or oiler. The difficulty was that on high-speed engines, oilers could no longer be mounted on moving parts, such as the crosshead or connecting rod. Any oil reservoir here would be churned around by the movement and such a necessarily small reserve might also be inadequate in capacity for an engine doing so much work in a small space. More care was thus given to the thoroughness of oiling, and moving parts such as the crankpin were fed by drillings through the crankshaft from oil supplies that were rotating but not moving, such as the main bearings. Centrifugal force was also used to distribute the oil. It was usual that high-speed engines would have only one or two lubricators, (Note: Steam oil for use inside the cylinder was often of a different grade from bearing oil, especially if the steam supply was superheated.) so that engine tending was a simpler task and less prone to breakdowns from simple carelessness and running a lubricator dry.

=== Single-acting engines ===
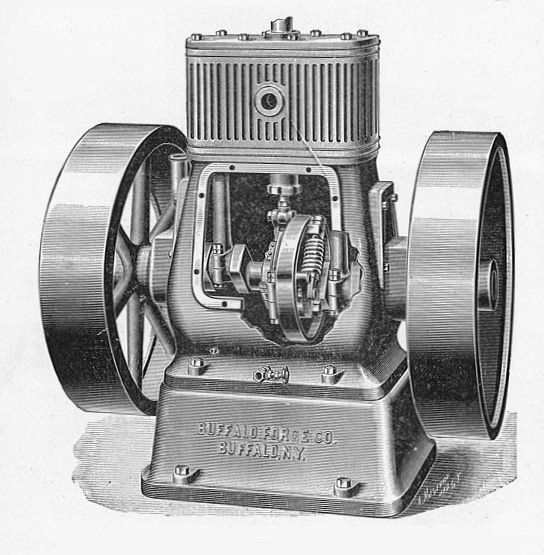
Twin-cylinder single-acting vertical engine with enclosed crankcase. The governor may be seen inside the crankcase.

As speeds increased, the high-speed engine evolved towards its developed form of the multi-cylinder vertical engine with an enclosed crankcase. There was also a tendency to use single-acting pistons. This had two advantages; the lubrication could be provided by a generous 'splash' system within the crankcase that also helped with cooling, and secondly that the forces in a single-acting engine always act in the same way, as a compression force along the piston rod and connecting rod. This meant that even if a bearing's clearances were relatively slack, the bearing was always held tight. Slack, and thus free-running, bearings could be accepted. An example of such an engine would be the twin-cylinder Westinghouse engines. These engines used a trunk piston, as used for internal combustion engines today, where there is no separate crosshead and the gudgeon pin of the connecting rod is moved up within the piston itself. This provides a very compact layout, but obviously requires a single-acting piston. The main crankshaft bearings of this engine were provided with separate oilers that drained into the crankcase sump. It was recognised that the crankcase oil would become contaminated with water from condensed steam and blow-by from the pistons. A valve was provided for draining this collected condensate off from beneath the oil in the bottom of the deep sump.

=== Double-acting engines and the invention of pressure lubrication ===
The important concept of pressure lubrication of engine bearings began with high-speed steam engines and is now a vital part of internal combustion engines. This is both reliable as a lubrication system and also allows the use of hydrostatic bearings ('oil wedge') that can support greater loads. The first patents for this were issued to Belliss & Morcom in 1890, from the work of their draughtsman Albert Charles Pain. Belliss & Morcom preferred double-acting cylinders, so as to produce the smallest possible engines for a given power; one of their major markets, like Peter Brotherhood, was in supplying generator sets to the Royal Navy for use in the confines of a warship engine room. The difficulty of a double-acting engine was that the direction of the forces in the connecting rod now reverses between compression and tension, so that the bearing clearances must be made tighter to avoid any rattling. Belliss and Morcom developed a two-cylinder engine of 20 bhp at 625 rpm that used a small separate oil pump to feed oil under pressure to the crank bearings, through long drilled holes in the crankshaft. This provided reliable lubrication and cooling and the pressure of the oil film was sufficient to allow the use of double-acting engines with adequate clearance to provide free running.

== See also ==
- Willans engine
- Uniflow engine
- Steam motor, the application of the high-speed engine principles to steam locomotives
