= Oil pump (internal combustion engine) =

Internal combustion engine part that circulates engine oil under pressure

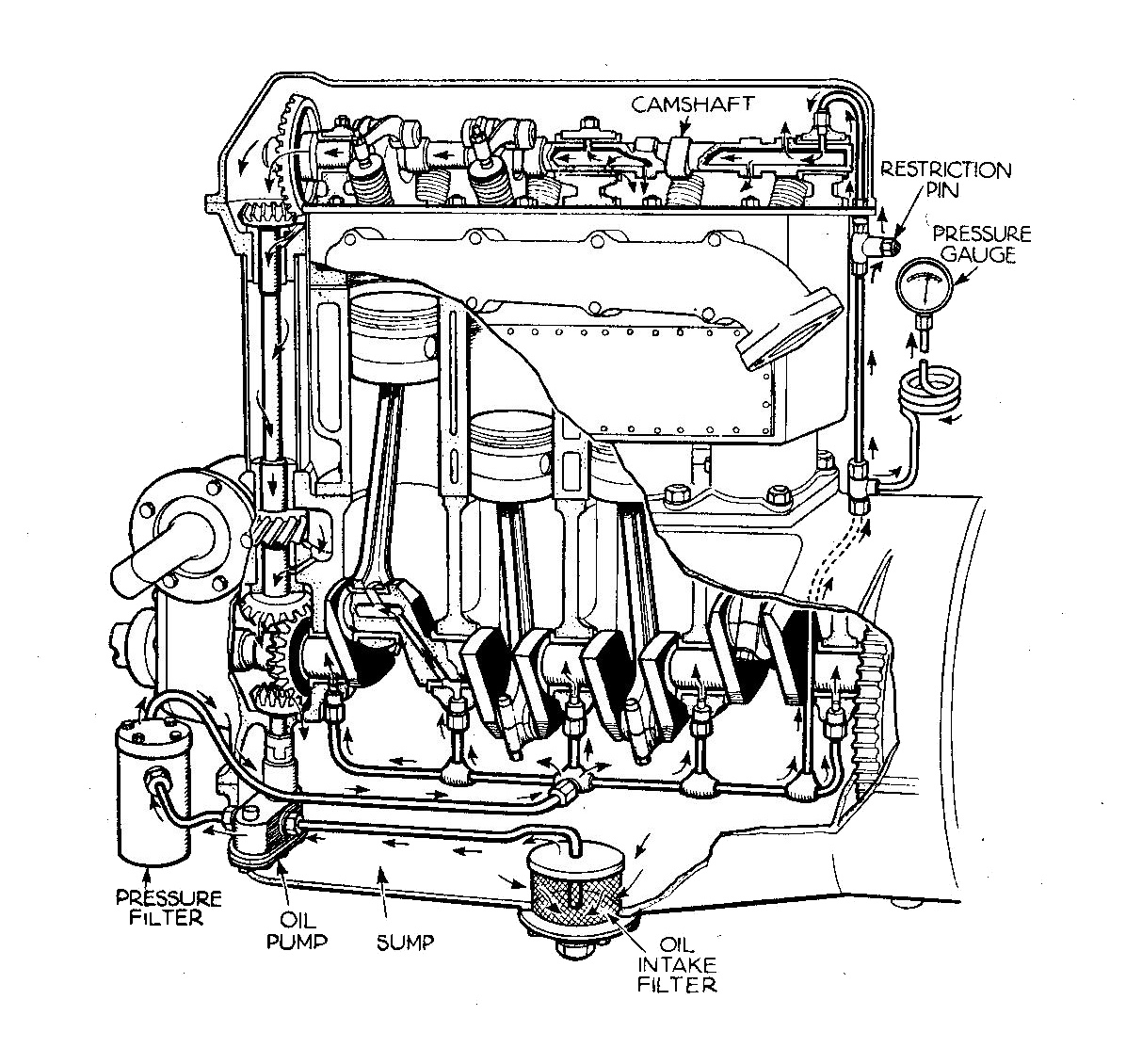
Oil circulation system

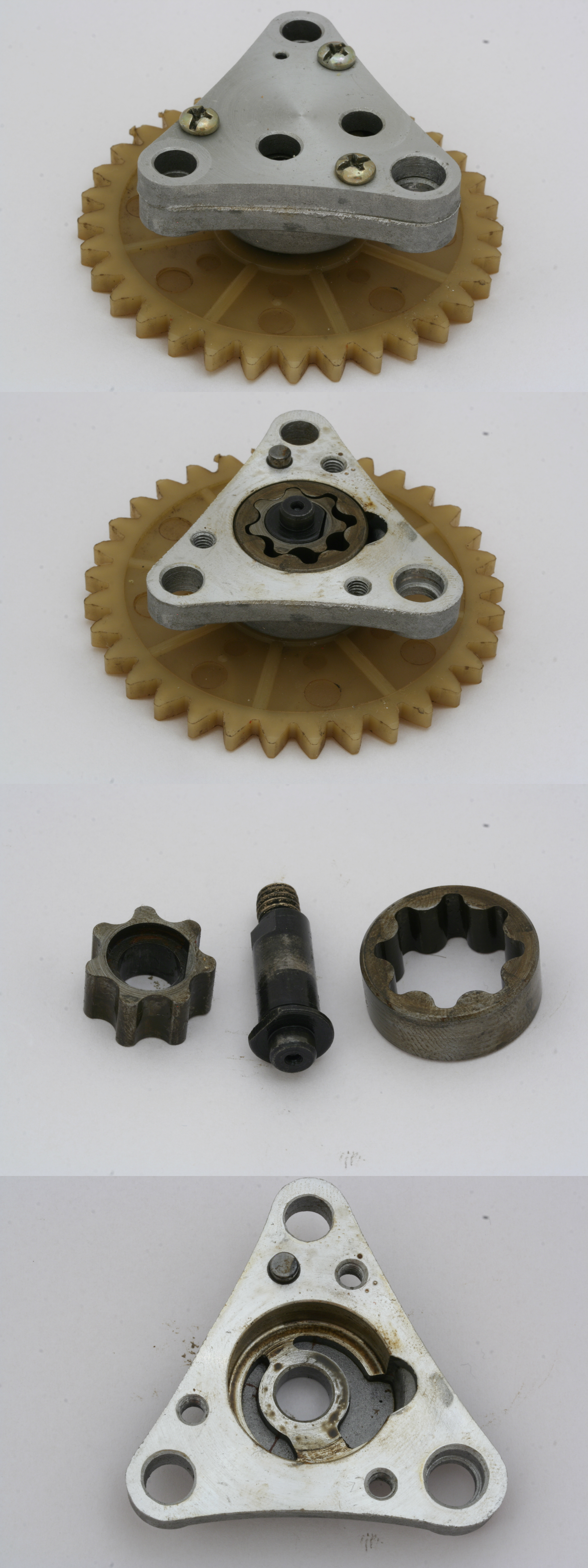
Gerotor type oil pump from a scooter engine

The oil pump is an internal combustion engine part that circulates engine oil under pressure to the rotating bearings, the sliding pistons and the camshaft of the engine. This lubricates the bearings, allows the use of higher-capacity fluid bearings, and also assists in cooling the engine.

As well as its primary purpose for lubrication, pressurized oil is increasingly used as a hydraulic fluid to power small actuators. One of the first notable uses in this way was for hydraulic tappets in camshaft and valve actuation. Increasingly common recent uses may include the tensioner for a timing belt or variators for variable valve timing systems.

== Pumps ==
The type of pump used varies. Gear pumps trochoid pumps and vane pumps (Note: Sliding vane pumps have become less common, as modern manufacturing techniques can more cheaply produce the complex precise shapes needed for other pump types. As engines become more durable and reliable, the wear aspect of the sliding vanes also becomes a concern.) are all commonly used. Plunger pumps have been used in the past, but these are now only used rarely, for small engines.

To avoid the need for priming, the pump is always mounted low-down, either submerged or around the level of the oil in the sump. A short pick-up pipe with a simple wire-mesh strainer reaches to the bottom of the sump.

=== Pump drive ===
For simplicity and reliability, mechanical pumps are used. They are typically driven by mechanical geartrains linked to the crankshaft. Reducing pump speed is beneficial (Note: For reasons of oil viscosity, a large slow pump requires less power to move the same oil volume as a small fast pump) and so it is common to drive the pump via the camshaft (if this is mounted in the cylinder block) or distributor shaft, which turns at half engine speed. Placing the oil pump low-down uses a near-vertical drive shaft, driven by helical skew gears from the camshaft. Some engines, such as the Fiat Twin Cam engine of 1964, began as OHV engines with an oil pump driven from a conventional camshaft in the cylinder block. When the twin overhead cam engine was developed, the previous oil pump arrangement was retained and the camshaft became a shortened stub shaft. Even when the distributor position was moved from the previous block-mount to being mounted on the cylinder head camshafts, the oil pump drive remained in the same position, the unused distributor position now covered by a blanking plate. Small engines, or scooters may have internal gear pumps mounted directly on their crankshaft.

For reliability, it is rare to use an external drive mechanism, either a separate belt drive or external gears, although camshaft-driven pumps often rely on the same timing belt. Additional separate belts are sometimes used where dry sump pumps have been added to engines during tuning.

Electric oil pumps are not used, again for reliability. Some 'turbo timer' electric auxiliary oil pumps are sometimes fitted to turbocharged engines. These are a second oil pump that continues to run after the engine has stopped, providing cooling oil to the hot bearings of a turbocharger for some minutes, whilst it cools down. (Note: An alternative system uses a pressurised hydraulic accumulator filled with oil, rather than a pump.) These are supplementary pumps and do not replace the main, mechanical, oil pump.

Electric pump as a main engine pump again will require big electric motors and it may be simply cheaper to drive directly from the engine. For e.g. BMW S65 engine's oil pump delivers ca. 45 LPM (Litres Per Minute) of oil at 5.5 bar pressure. This pump would require a significantly large motor to drive.

== Lubricating system ==
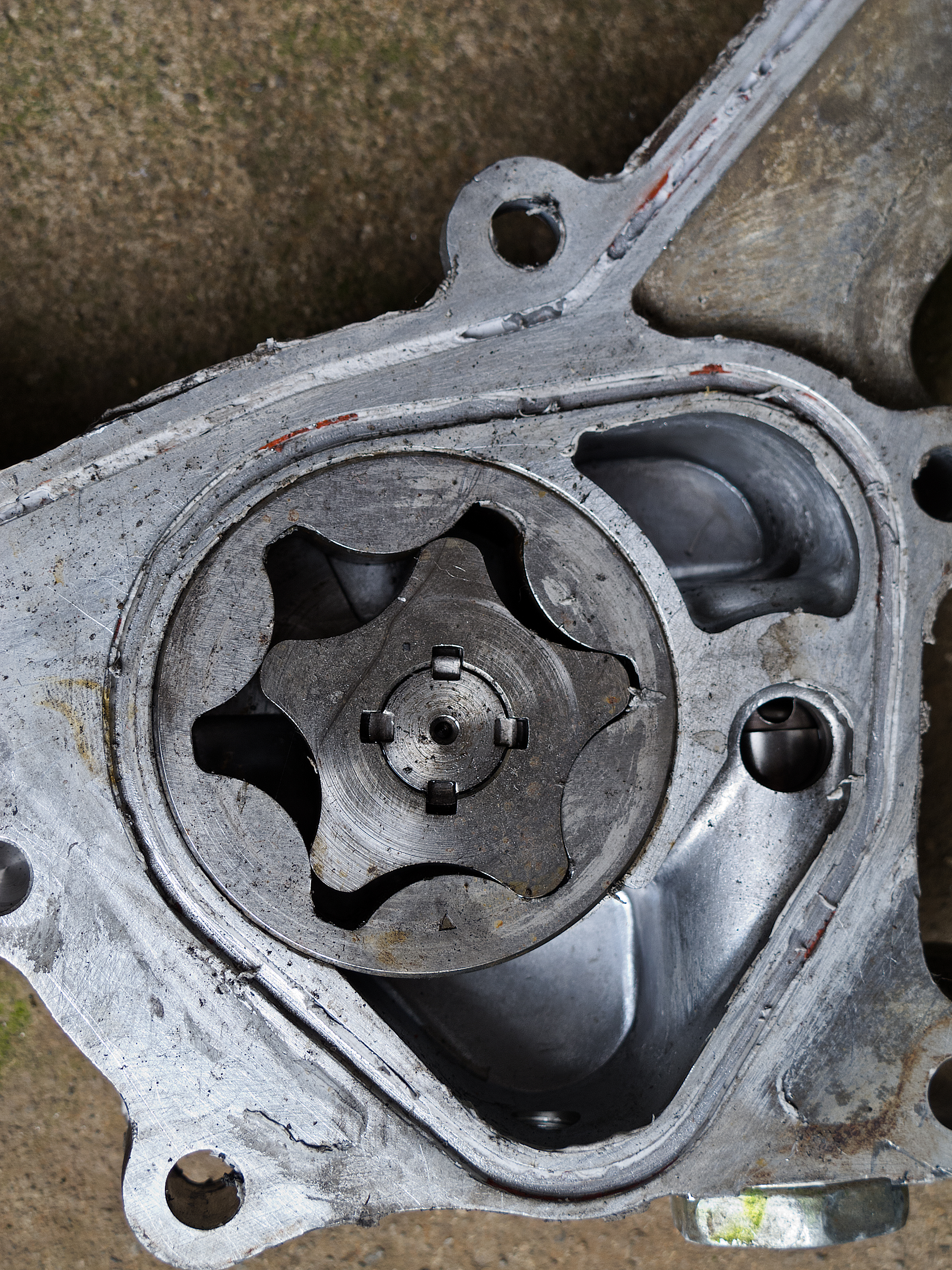
Oil pump from a Toyota Coaster bus (1HZ type engine)

Principle of gear pump operation.

The oiling system addresses the need to properly lubricate an engine when it's running. Properly lubricating an engine not only reduces friction between moving parts but is also the main method by which heat is removed from pistons, bearings, and shafts. Failing to properly lubricate an engine will result in engine failure. The oil pump forces the motor oil through the passages in the engine to properly distribute oil to different engine components. In a common oiling system, oil is drawn out of the oil sump (oil pan, in US English) through a wire mesh strainer that removes some of the larger pieces of debris from the oil. The flow made by the oil pump allows the oil to be distributed around the engine. In this system, oil flows through an oil filter and sometimes an oil cooler, before going through the engine's oil passages and being dispersed to lubricate pistons, rings, springs, valve stems, and more.

== Oil pressure ==
The oil pressure generated in most engines should be about 10 psi per every 1000 revolutions per minute (rpm), peaking around 55-65 psi.

Local pressure (at the crankshaft journal and bearing) is far higher than the 50, 60 psi &c. set by the pump's relief valve, and will reach hundreds of psi. This higher pressure is developed by the relative speeds in feet per second (not RPM or journal size directly) of the crankshaft journal itself against the bearing, the bearing width (to the closest pressure leak), oil viscosity, and temperature, balanced against the bearing clearance (the leakage rate).

All pump pressure does is "fill in the hole" and refresh the oil in the annular space faster than the leak expels it. This is why low-speed engines have relatively large journals, with only modest pump size and pressure. Low pressure indicates that leakage from the bearings is higher than the pump's delivery rate.

== Gauge pressure ==
The oil pressure at the pump outlet, which is what opens the pressure relief valve, is simply the resistance to flow caused by the bearing clearances and restrictions.

The oil pressure gauge or warning lamp reflects the pressure at the specific point where its sensor is located within the pressurized system. It does not provide an overall average or a generalized picture of the systemic pressure.

Despite the frequent comparison to hydraulic engineering theory, this is not a "closed system" in which oil pressure is balanced and identical everywhere. All engines are "open systems", because the oil returns to the pan by a series of controlled leaks. The bearings farthest from the pump always have the lowest pressure because of the number of leaks between the pump and that bearing. Excess bearing clearance increases the pressure loss between the first and last bearing in a series.

Depending on condition, an engine may have acceptable gauge pressure, and still only 5 psi pressure at one connecting rod, which will fail under high load.

The pressure is actually created by the resistance to the flow of the oil around the engine. So, the pressure of the oil may vary during operation, with temperature, engine speed, and wear on the engine. Colder oil temperature can cause higher pressure, as the oil is thicker, while higher engine speeds cause the pump to run faster and push more oil through the engine. Because of variances in temperature and normal higher engine speed upon cold engine start up, it's normal to see higher oil pressure upon engine start up than at normal operating temperatures, where normal oil pressure usually falls between 30 and 45 psi. Too much oil pressure can create unnecessary work for the engine and even add air into the system. To ensure that the oil pressure does not exceed the rated maximum, once pressure exceeds a preset limit a spring-loaded pressure relief valve dumps excess pressure either to the suction side of the pump, or directly back to the oil pan or tank.

=== High Oil Pressure ===
The result of too high an oil pressure is the front or rear main engine seals will be blown and or blow the oil plugs out. In other words, any possible entry into the crankcase that is sealed somehow could be blown. High oil pressure frequently means extremely high pressure on cold start-up, but this is a design flaw rather than an automatic consequence of high pressure. The observation "if you raise the maximum pressure, the cold pressure goes too high" is accurate, but not intentional.

Even the stock pumps (regardless of brand and model) do not have enough relief valve capacity: the relief port is too small to handle the volume of cold oil. This is why there is a significant difference between cold & hot oil, high & low RPM, &c., but it's typically not a problem with stock engines because of the spring-loaded pressure relief valve mentioned above. A correctly designed relief port (which is not found in production engines) will flow any oil volume the gears will pass, regardless of oil viscosity or temperature, and the gauge reading will only vary slightly.

The oil pressure is monitored by an oil pressure sending unit, usually mounted to the block of the engine. This can either be a spring-loaded pressure sensor or an electronic pressure sensor, depending on the type of sending unit. Problems with the oil pressure sending unit or the connections between it and the driver's display can cause abnormal oil pressure readings when oil pressure is perfectly acceptable.

=== Low Oil Pressure ===
There are only four reasons for low oil pressure:

1. No oil or low oil in the engine;
2. Worn or defective oil pump or broken pressure relief valve spring;
3. Worn main bearings (big ends have nothing to do with oil pressure as most of the pressure to these are supplied by centripetal force); and
4. Oil gallery fracture or blockage.

Low oil pressure can cause engine damage. The first thing to fail will be cam carrier bearings if the vehicle is OHC as this is fed through a restrictor and low pressure will starve the top of the engine of lubrication. If pistons have crown jets (e.g., scania), this could cause piston/liner nip. Also the crankshaft and connecting rod bearings may seize. Indications of low oil pressure may be that the warning light is on, a low pressure reading on the gauge, or clattering/clinking noises from the engine. Low oil pressure is a problem that must be addressed immediately to prevent serious damage.

The leading cause of low oil pressure in an engine is wear on the engine's vital parts. Over time, engine bearings and seals suffer from wear and tear. Wear can cause these parts to eventually lose their original dimensions, and this increased clearance allows for a greater volume of oil to flow over time which can greatly reduce oil pressure. For instance, .001 of an inch worn off of the engine's main bearings can cause up to a 20% loss in oil pressure. Simply replacing worn bearings may fix this problem, but in older engines with a lot of wear not much can be done besides completely overhauling the engine.

Particles in the oil can also cause serious problems with oil pressure. After oil flows through the engine, it returns to the oil pan, and can carry along a lot of debris. The debris can cause problems with the oil pickup screen and the oil pump itself. The holes in the oil pickup screen measure about 0.04 square inches (0.26 cm^{2}). Holes of this size only pick up bigger pieces of debris and allow a lot of smaller pieces to flow through it. The holes in the screen are so big (relative to debris) because at low temperatures and slow engine speed the oil is very viscous and needs large openings to flow freely. Even with these large holes in the screen, it can still become clogged and cause low oil pressure. A .005-inch-thick (0.13 mm) coating on the screen can reduce hole size to about .03 square inches (0.19 cm^{2}), which in turn reduces the flow of oil by 44 percent.

Even after passing through the oil pickup screen and the oil filter, debris can remain in the oil. It is very important to change the oil and oil filter to minimize the amount of debris flowing through your engine. This harmful debris along with normal engine wear in high mileage engines causes an increase in clearances between bearings and other moving parts.

Low oil pressure may be simply because there is not enough oil in the sump, due to burning oil (normally caused by piston ring wear or worn valve seals) or leakage. The piston rings serve to seal the combustion chamber, as well as remove oil from the internal walls of the cylinder. However, when they wear, their effectiveness drops, which leaves oil on the cylinder walls during combustion. In some engines, burning a small amount of oil is normal and shouldn't necessarily cause any alarm, whereas heavy oil consumption is a sign that the engine might need an overhaul.

=== Oil Pumps in High Performance Engines ===
Not all engines have the same oiling needs. High performance engines, for example, place higher stress on the lubricating system. In this case, the lubricating system must be especially robust to prevent engine damage. Most engines in cars on the road today don't run much past 5,000–6,000 rpm, but that isn't always the case in performance engines, where engine speeds could reach up to 8000-9000 rpm. In engines like these, it is imperative that the oil circulates quickly enough, or air may become trapped in the oil. Also, to free up power, some engines in performance applications run lower weight oil, which requires less power to run the oil pump. Common oil weights in engines today are usually either 5W-30 or 10W-30 oil, whereas performance engines might use 0W-20 oil, which is less viscous.

== Wet and dry sump systems ==
Conventional wet sump engines have one oil pump. It is generally located inside the lower part of the engine, usually below and/or to one side of the crankshaft. On dry sump engines, at least two oil pumps are required: one to pressurize and distribute the oil around the engine components, and at least one other 'scavenge pump' to evacuate the oil which has pooled at the bottom of the engine. This scavenge pump is sometimes (but not always) located in the 'sump' of the engine, and crucially, this scavenge pump's flow-rate capacity must exceed that of the pump which pressurizes and distributes oil throughout the engine.

Because of the dry sump's external oil reservoir, excess air can escape the oil before the oil is pumped back through the engine. Dry sumps also allow for more power because they reduce the amount of windage, oil sloshing up into the rotating assembly, and the vacuum from the scavenge pump improves ring seal. Dry sumps are more popular in racing applications because of the improved power and reduced oil sloshing that would otherwise reduce oil pressure. Disadvantages of dry sumps are increased weight, additional parts, and more chances for leaks and problems to occur.

== See also ==
- List of auto parts
- Ring oiler
