= DRB Class 19.10 =

German steam locomotive

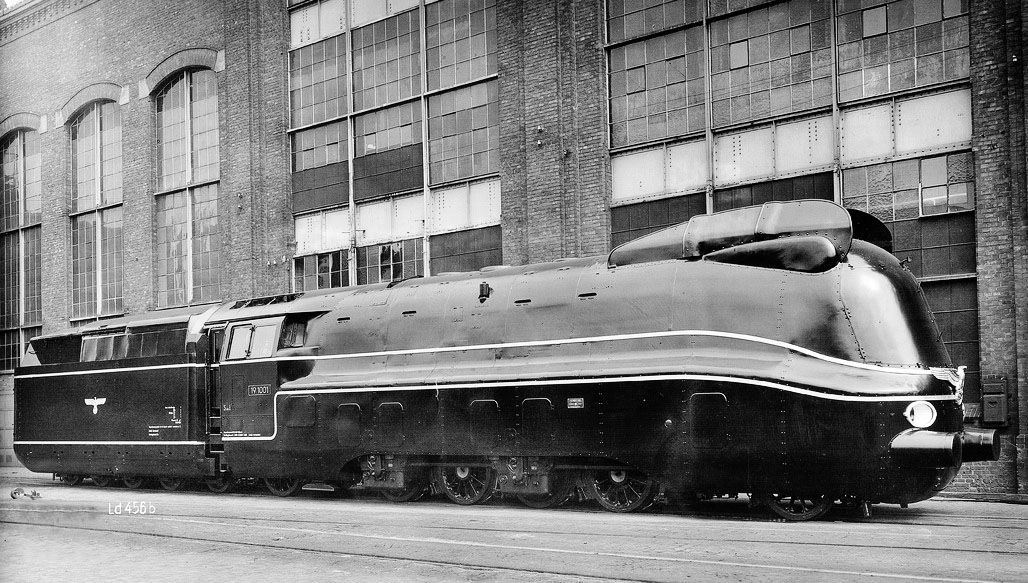
- 19 1001 during a test run in 1941
Type and origin
- Power type: Steam
- Builder: Henschel & Sohn
- Serial number: 25000
- Build date: 1941
- Total produced: 1
Specifications
- Configuration
  - Whyte: 2-2-2-2-2-2
  - UIC: 1′Do1′ h8
  - German: S 46.18, later S 46.20
- Gauge: 1,435 mm (4 ft 8 1/2 in)
- Leading dia.: 1,000 mm (39 3/8 in)
- Driver dia.: 1,250 mm (49 1/4 in)
- Trailing dia.: 1,250 mm (49 1/4 in)
- Tender wheels: 1,000 mm (39 3/8 in)
- Wheelbase
  - Axle spacing (Asymmetrical): 3,000 mm (9 ft 10 1/8 in) +; 1,650 mm (5 ft 5 in) +; 1,650 mm (5 ft 5 in) +; 1,650 mm (5 ft 5 in) +; 3,340 mm (10 ft 11 1/2 in) =
  - Engine: 11,290 mm (37 ft 1/2 in)
  - Tender: 1,750 mm (5 ft 8 7/8 in) +; 1,500 mm (4 ft 11 in) +; 1,350 mm (4 ft 5 1/8 in) +; 1,350 mm (4 ft 5 1/8 in) =; 6,000 mm (19 ft 8 1/4 in)
  - incl. tender: 19,385 mm (63 ft 7 1/4 in)
- Length
  - Over headstocks: 22,475 mm (73 ft 8 7/8 in)
  - Over buffers: 23,775 mm (78 ft 0 in)
- Height: 4,550 mm (14 ft 11 1/8 in)
- Axle load: 18.6 t (18.3 long tons; 20.5 short tons)
- Adhesive weight: 74.6 t (73.4 long tons; 82.2 short tons)
- Empty weight: 99.1 t (97.5 long tons; 109.2 short tons)
- Service weight: 109.3 t (107.6 long tons; 120.5 short tons)
- Tender type: 2′3 T 38 St
- Fuel type: Coal
- Fuel capacity: 12.5 t (12.3 long tons; 13.8 short tons)
- Water cap.: 38.0 m^{3} (8,400 imp gal; 10,000 US gal)
- Firebox
  - Grate area: 4.55 m^{2} (49.0 sq ft)
- Boiler
  - Pitch: 3,100 mm (10 ft 2 in)
  - Tube plates: 5,800 mm (19 ft 3/8 in)
  - Small tubes: 54 mm (2 1/8 in), 128 off
  - Large tubes: 143 mm (5 5/8 in), 43 off
- Boiler pressure: 20 bar (20.4 kgf/cm^{2}; 290 psi)
- Heating surface
  - Firebox: 18.0 m^{2} (194 sq ft)
  - Tubes: 114.29 m^{2} (1,230.2 sq ft)
  - Arch tubes: 2.0 m^{2} (22 sq ft)
  - Flues: 105.38 m^{2} (1,134.3 sq ft)
  - Total surface: 239.67 m^{2} (2,579.8 sq ft)
- Superheater
  - Heating area: 100.00 m^{2} (1,076.4 sq ft)
- Cylinders: Eight arranged in four V2 motors
- Cylinder size: 300 mm × 300 mm (11 13/16 in × 11 13/16 in)
Performance figures
- Maximum speed: Service: 175 km/h (109 mph); Test: 186 km/h (116 mph)
- Indicated power: 1,700 PS (1,250 kW; 1,680 hp)
Career
- Operators: Deutsche Reichsbahn
- Numbers: 19 1001
- Scrapped: 1952

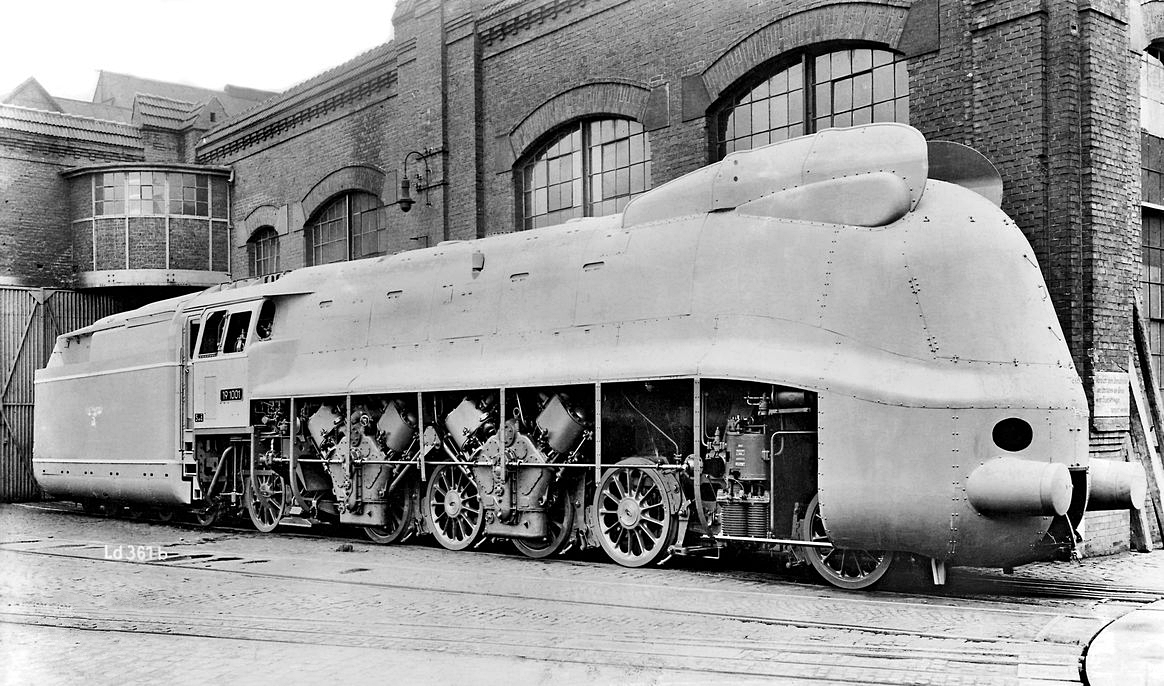
Locomotive 19 1001 with streamlining shields removed. Note the individual steam motors on each axle.

The steam motorised locomotive no. 19 1001 was a German express train steam locomotive with the Deutsche Reichsbahn during World War II. Manufactured by Henschel, this streamlined trials locomotive with factory number 25000 was an experimental design featuring a single-axle drive to each axle, a method commonly used in electric locomotives. The locomotive's four driving axles were each driven by a separate steam motor, showcasing innovative technology for its time.

At the end of the war, the locomotive remained in the vicinity of Göttingen and was subsequently transferred to the manufacturer on the orders of the American occupying forces for repair. After the necessary repairs were completed, a short test run was conducted between Kassel and Wabern. Recognizing the locomotive's special nature and innovative technology, the U.S. Army decided to ship the 19 1001 to the United States. The locomotive was then exhibited alongside the class 52 2006 condensing locomotive at Fort Monroe in Virginia, starting in March 1946. Subsequently, the locomotive was used in the U.S. for a number of test runs.

Though mostly known as a 2-8-2 it's proper labeling would be a 2-2-2-2-2-2 for the fact each driver axle is separately driven and has no connecting rods between each of the driver axles, making it one of the two only Quadruplex steam locomotives ever made.
