= Ring oiler =

Form of oil-lubrication system

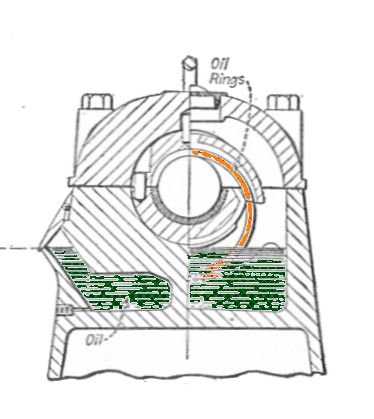
Section through a bearing, showing the oil sump beneath (green) and the ring oiler (orange) in place around the shaft

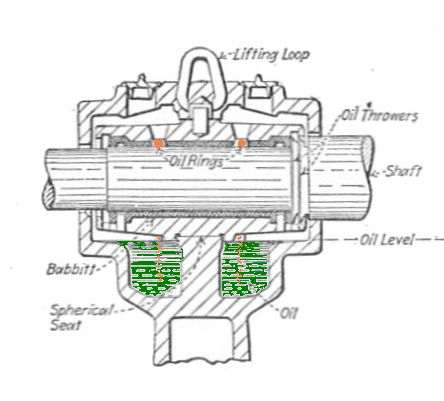
Section though a long Babbitt metal sleeve bearing, with two ring oilers fitted through grooves in the upper part of the bearing.

A ring oiler or oil ring is a form of oil-lubrication system for bearings.

Ring oilers were used for medium-speed applications with moderate loads, during the first half of the 20th century. These represented the later years of the stationary steam engine, and the beginnings of the high-speed steam engine, the internal combustion oil engine and electrical generating equipment. Before this time plain bearings were lubricated by drip-feed oil cups or manually by an engine tender with an oil can. As speeds or bearing loads later increased, forced pressure lubrication became more prevalent and the ring oiler fell from use.

A ring oiler is a simple device, consisting of a large metal ring placed around a horizontal shaft, adjacent to a bearing. An oil sump is underneath this shaft and the ring is large enough to dip into the oil. As the shaft rotates, the ring is carried round with it. The rotating ring in turn picks up some oil and deposits it onto the shaft, from where it flows sideways and lubricates the bearings. The oil ring is effectively a simple lubrication pump, with only one moving part and no complex or high-precision components. The device is crude, but automatic, effective and reliable. Unlike a drip oiler, there is also no need to close off the oiler or remove oil wicks when the machine is stopped.

Ring oilers were used for speeds up to around 1,000 rpm. Above this, the oil tended to be thrown centrifugally from the ring, rather than carried by it (although it is still currently applied on steam turbines with speeds around 3200 rpm). The bearing must also remain horizontal and stable, so although suitable for crankshaft main bearings, they could not be used on connecting rod big end bearings. They were not used on vehicles for similar reasons, although the engines concerned at this time were anyway too large and heavy for practical mobile use. Automatic ring oilers were particularly useful for large engines with multiple horizontally opposed cylinders, where it was otherwise difficult to access the central main bearings. Ring oilers were most suited where bearing side-loads were relatively light, but the bearing capacity required more lubrication than could be supplied by a drip feed oiler. For this reason they were widely used on larger electric motors and generators.
