= Turbo timer =

Device designed to prevent premature turbo wear and failure

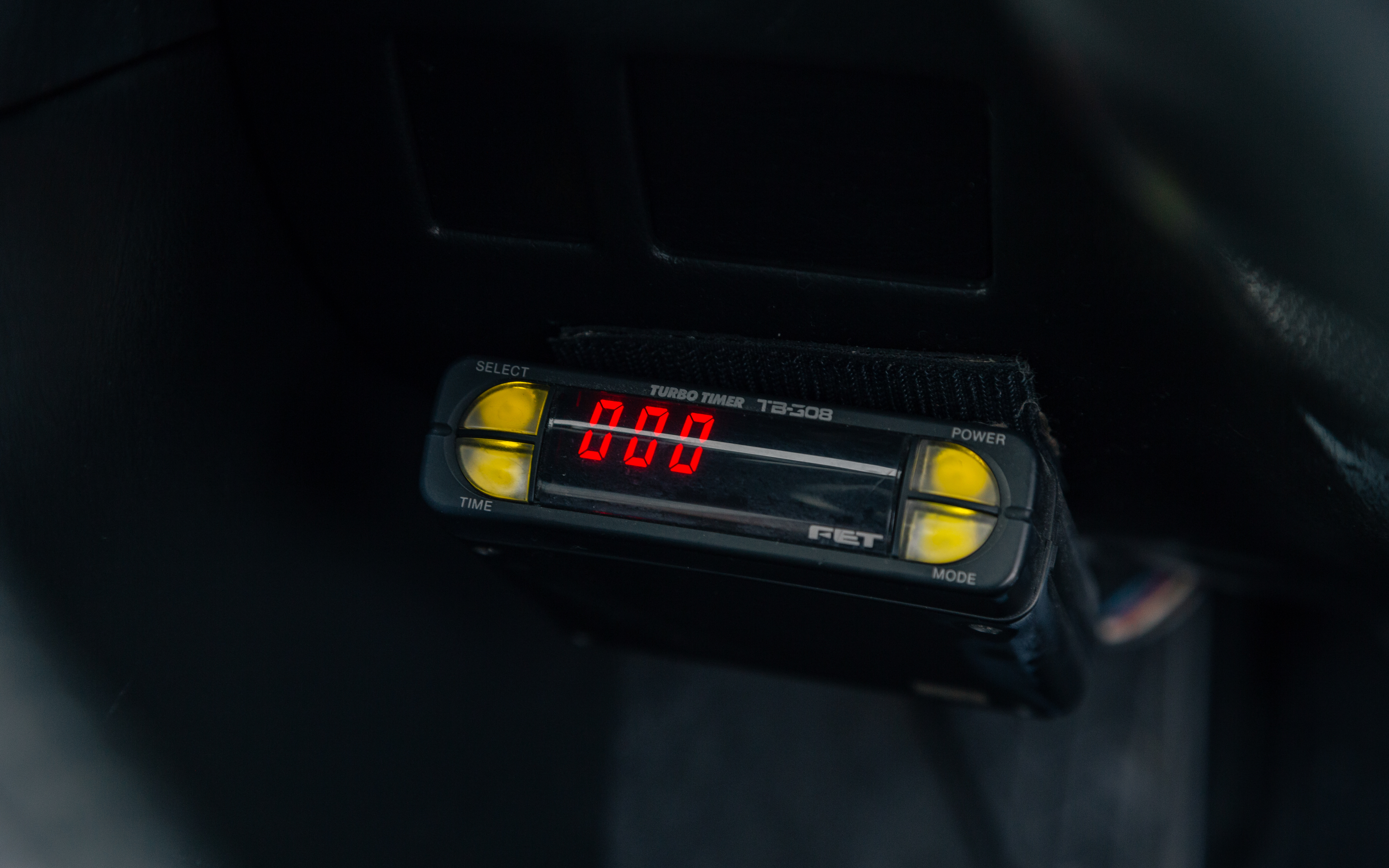
A turbo timer in a Toyota Celica GT-Four

A turbo timer is a device designed to keep an automotive engine running for a pre-specified period in order to automatically execute the cool-down period required to prevent premature turbo wear and failure. Most turbo timers are based on digital electronics. Turbo timers can usually be disabled by an external switch, this is normally done using the handbrake switch, or using an automatic one. After a period of driving when a turbocharger has been working hard, it is important to let the engine run at idle speed for a period, allowing the compressor assembly to cool from the lower gas temperatures in both the exhaust and intake tracts. At the same time the lubricating oil from the engine is able to circulate properly so the turbine won't burn the lubricating oil that would otherwise be trapped within the charger with the turbine rotating at high speed. This circulation of lubricating oil allows for a steady flow, which cleans overheated oil out of the compressor. If the engine is shut off with this overheated oil inside the compressor, it breaks down into carbon deposits. These carbon deposits will develop in the bearing, which can lead to less efficient oil circulation, failed turbo seals, and even ultimately a failed turbo.

== History ==
The turbo timer was originally introduced into the Japanese domestic market in 1982, and was designed to increase the lifetime of turbocharged engines. This new electrical device was designed by HKS to keep the engine idling for a preset period after the ignition was switched off, allowing the turbocharger to cool and reducing the risk of carbon deposits forming from overheated engine oil. Eventually HKS developed the turbo timer more, including features such as adjustable timing, multiple different time presets, the ability to monitor voltage, as well as a combined security system.

== Common applications ==
- Performance Vehicles - These vehicles are usually designed to be fast and efficient, often taking advantage of a turbocharger to achieve this. A turbo timer can prevent the need to sit at idle after being driven hard.
- Modified Vehicles - Tuner culture (modifying and programming vehicles for looks and speed) has been very popular for a while now, and many vehicles are either originally equipped with a turbocharger, or are modified to have one. These cars are often driven very intensely as well, causing a turbo timer to be a useful addition to ensure a longer lifetime for the engine and turbocharger.
- Motorsports - In many motorsports, such as rallying, offroad racing, and autocross, vehicles will be equipped with a turbocharger and driven very quickly which can be very demanding of vehicle engines. Because of this turbo timers can often be installed to ensure the high temperatures these components see are safely cooled.
- Fleet Vehicles - These can often be turbocharged applications as well, and a turbo timer can be installed by companies to help the equipment last longer.
- Diesel Turbocharged Vehicles - While use in gas powered vehicles can be more common, turbo-diesel engines can also benefit from the use of a turbo timer.

== Modern use ==
In reality, turbo timers are only significantly useful in the instance of hard driving, such as in autocross or other race-track instances. With regard to modern automotive turbochargers, the need for a turbo timer can be eliminated by simply ensuring the car does not produce any 'boost' (during driving) for several minutes prior to the ignition being shut off. Because of this, use in modern vehicles has greatly decreased, although they can offer benefits in some vehicles such as the Subaru WRX, Mitsubishi Evolution, and other commonly modified, and hard-driven vehicles.
