= Single- and double-acting cylinders =

Classification of reciprocating engine cylinders

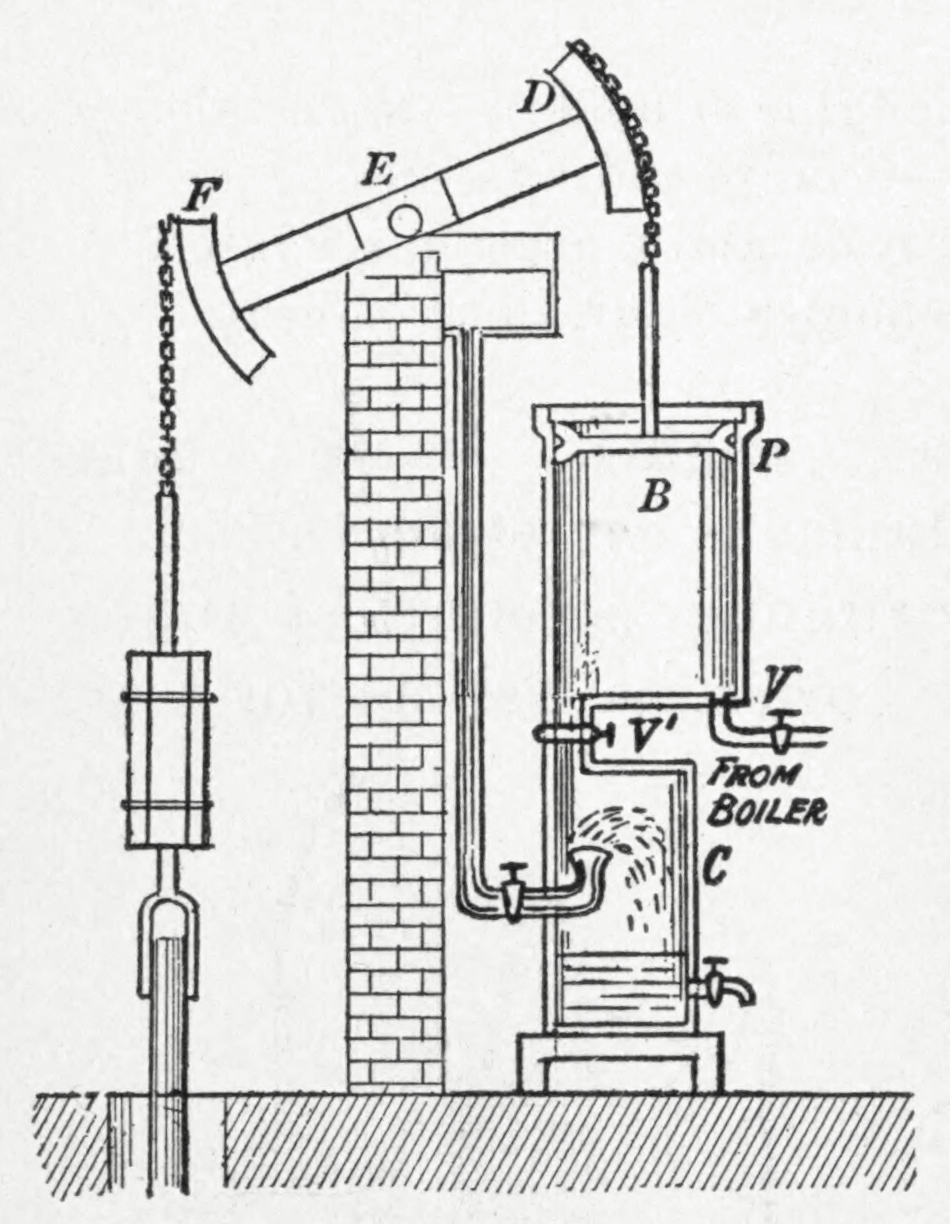
Atmospheric beam engine with one of the first single-acting power cylinders

In mechanical engineering, the cylinders of reciprocating engines are often classified by whether they are single- or double-acting, depending on how the working fluid acts on the piston.

== Single-acting ==
A single-acting cylinder in a reciprocating engine is a cylinder in which the working fluid acts on one side of the piston only. A single-acting cylinder relies on the load, springs, other cylinders, or the momentum of a flywheel, to push the piston back in the other direction. Single-acting cylinders are found in most kinds of reciprocating engine. They are almost universal in internal combustion engines (e.g. petrol and diesel engines) and are also used in many external combustion engines such as Stirling engines and some steam engines. They are also found in pumps and hydraulic rams.

== Double-acting ==
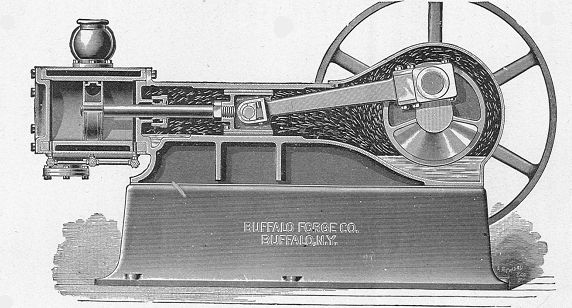
Typical horizontal steam engine with double-acting cylinder

A double-acting cylinder is a cylinder in which the working fluid acts alternately on both sides of the piston. In order to connect the piston in a double-acting cylinder to an external mechanism, such as a crank shaft, a hole must be provided in one end of the cylinder for the piston rod, and this is fitted with a gland or "stuffing box" to prevent escape of the working fluid. Double-acting cylinders are common in steam engines but unusual in other engine types. Many hydraulic and pneumatic cylinders use them where it is needed to produce a force in both directions. A double-acting hydraulic cylinder has a port at each end, supplied with hydraulic fluid for both the retraction and extension of the piston. A double-acting cylinder is used where an external force is not available to retract the piston or it can be used where high force is required in both directions of travel.

== Steam engines ==
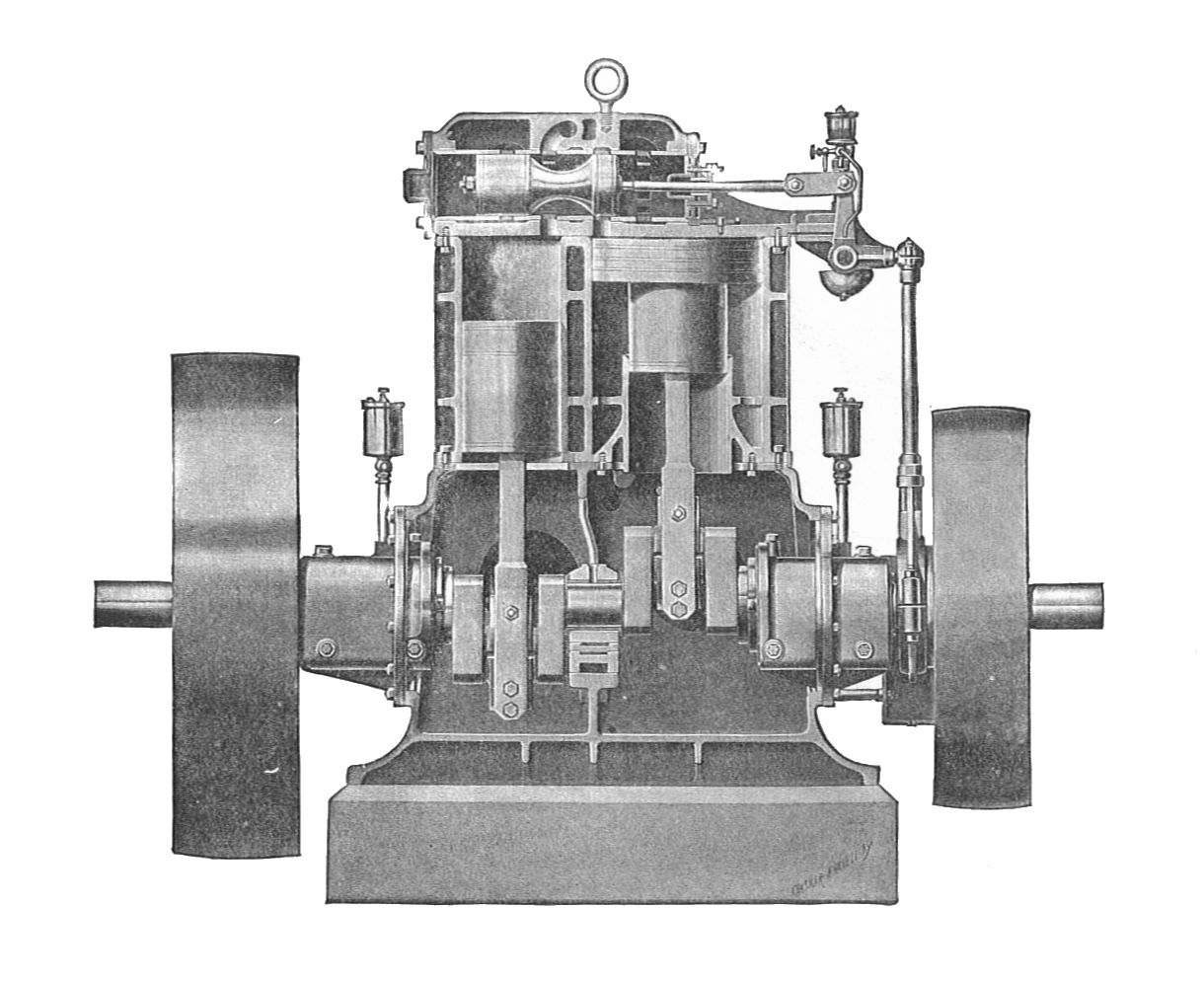
Westinghouse single-acting high-speed steam engine

Single-acting oscillating-cylinder steam engine

Steam engines normally use double-acting cylinders. However, early steam engines, such as atmospheric engines and some beam engines, were single-acting. These often transmitted their force through the beam by means of chains and an "arch head", as only a tension in one direction was needed.

Where these were used for pumping mine shafts and only had to act against a load in one direction, single-acting designs remained in use for many years. The main impetus towards double-acting cylinders came when James Watt was trying to develop a rotative beam engine, that could be used to drive machinery via an output shaft. Compared to a single-cylinder engine, a double-acting cylinder gave a smoother power output. The high-pressure engine, (Note: The pressure of around 30 psi (2 bar) was low by today's standard and only "high" in comparison to Watt engines.) as developed by Richard Trevithick, used double-acting pistons and became the model for most steam engines afterwards.

Some of the later steam engines, the high-speed steam engines, used single-acting pistons of a new design. The crosshead became part of the piston, (Note: This trunk piston is familiar from internal combustion engines today.) and there was no longer any piston rod. This was for similar reasons to the internal combustion engine, as avoiding the piston rod and its seals allowed a more effective crankcase lubrication system.

Small models and toys often use single-acting cylinders for the above reason but also to reduce manufacturing costs.

== Internal combustion engines ==
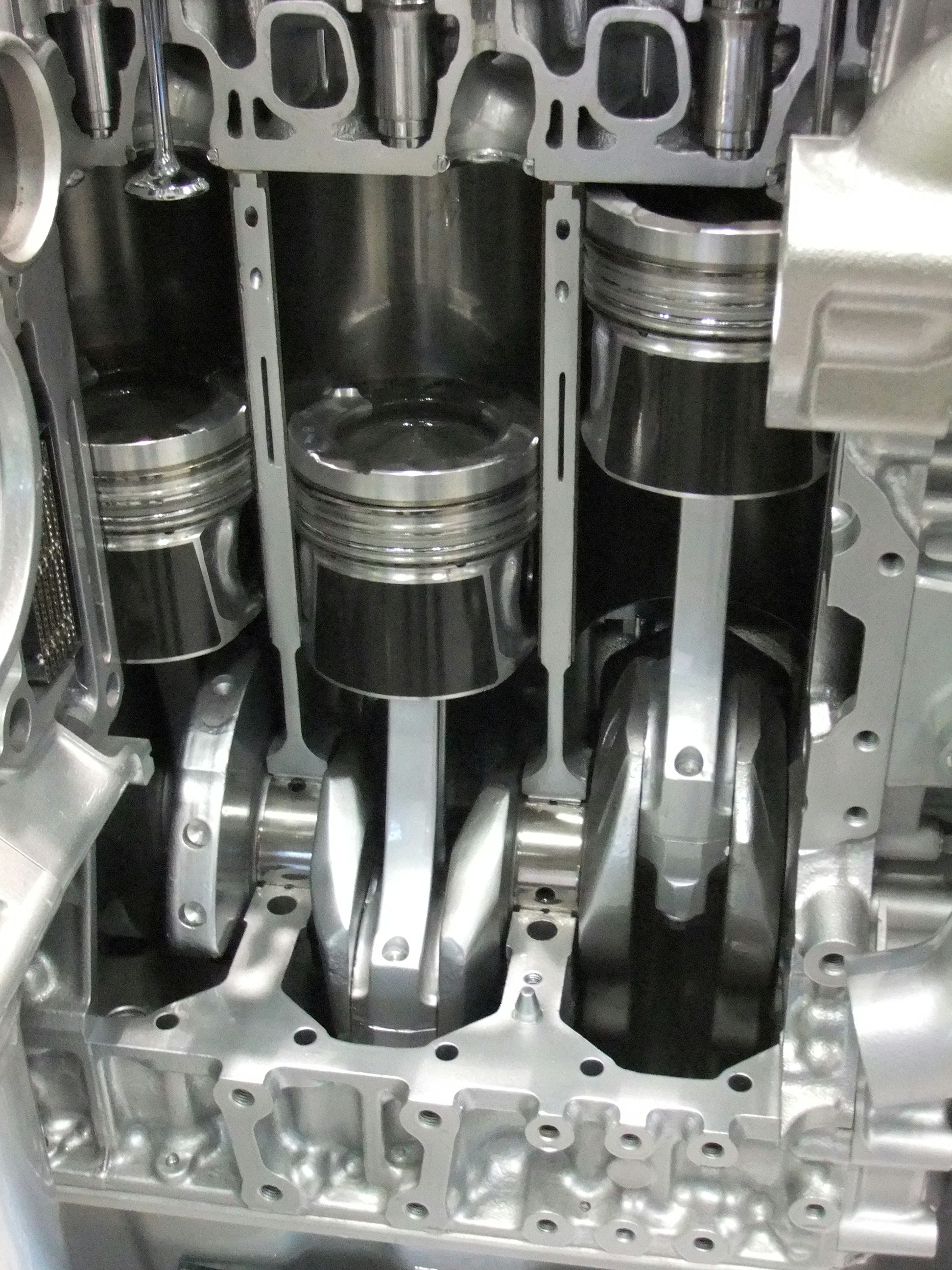
Single-acting pistons of a typical modern diesel car engine

In contrast to steam engines, nearly all internal combustion engines have used single-acting cylinders.

Their pistons are usually trunk pistons, where the gudgeon pin joint of the connecting rod is within the piston itself. This avoids the crosshead, piston rod and its sealing gland, but it also makes a single-acting piston almost essential. This, in turn, has the advantage of allowing easy access to the bottom of the piston for lubricating oil, which also has an important cooling function. This avoids local overheating of the piston and rings.

=== Crankcase compression two-stroke engines ===
Small petrol two-stroke engines, such as for motorcycles, use crankcase compression rather than a separate supercharger or scavenge blower. This uses both sides of the piston as working faces, the lower side of the piston acting as a piston compressor to compress the inlet charge ready for the next stroke. The piston is still considered as single-acting, as only one of these faces produces power.

=== Double-acting internal combustion engines ===
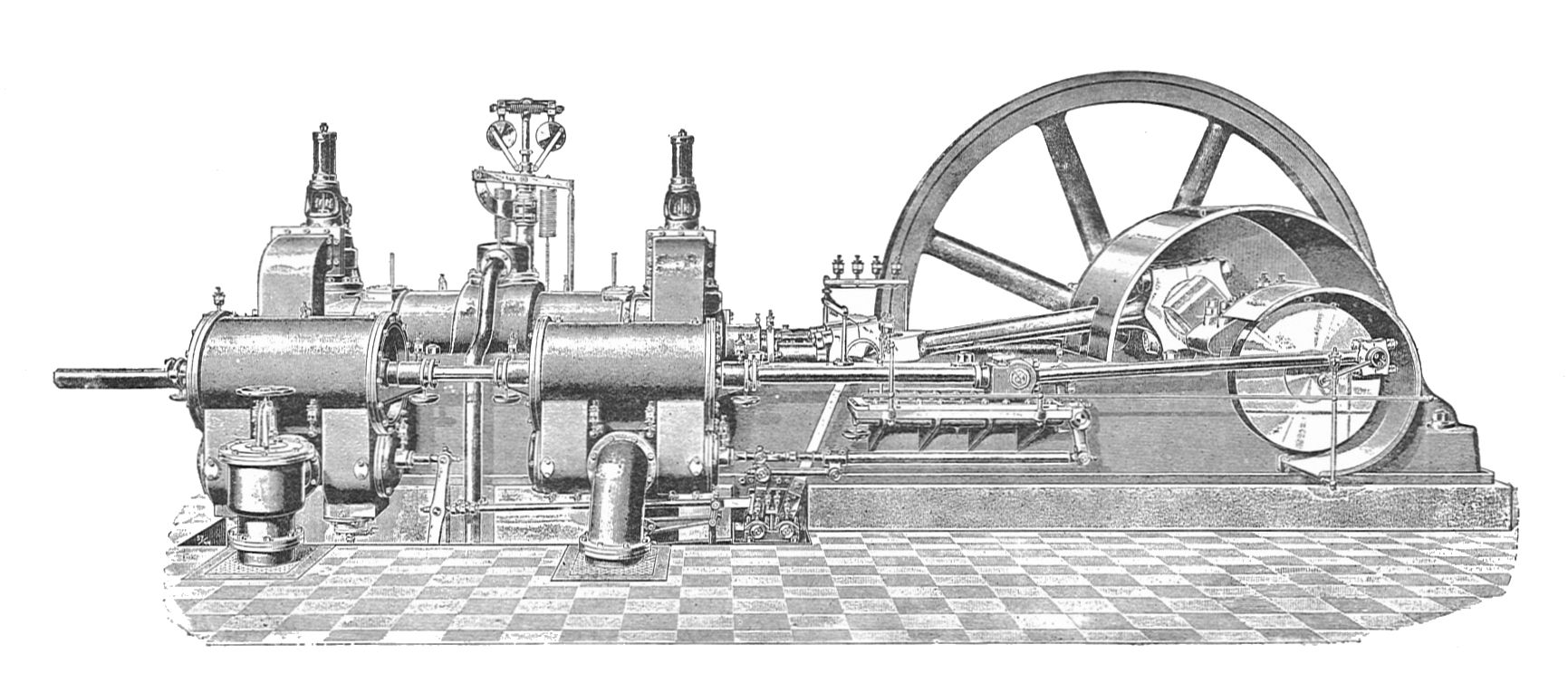
Körting double-acting gas engine

Some early gas engines, such as Lenoir's original engines, from around 1860, were double-acting and followed steam engines in their design.

Internal combustion engines soon switched to single-acting cylinders. This was for two reasons: as for the high-speed steam engine, the high force on each piston and its connecting rod was so great that it placed large demands upon the bearings. A single-acting piston, where the direction of the forces was consistently compressive along the connecting rod, allowed for tighter bearing clearances. Secondly the need for large valve areas to provide good gas flow, whilst requiring a small volume for the combustion chamber so as to provide good compression, monopolised the space available in the cylinder head. Lenoir's steam engine-derived cylinder was inadequate for the petrol engine and so a new design, based around poppet valves and a single-acting trunk piston appeared instead.

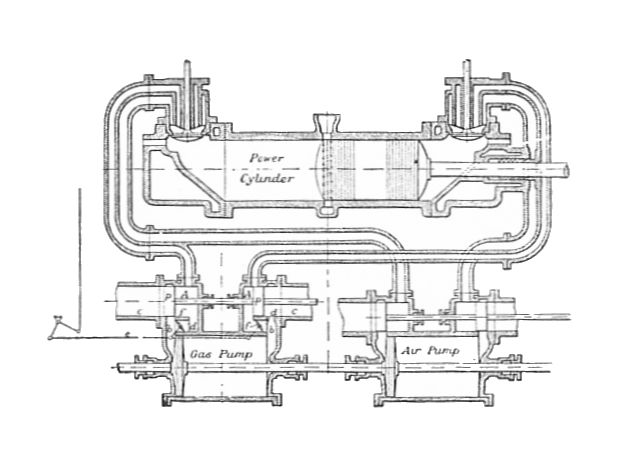
Körting gas engine, section

Extremely large gas engines were also built as blowing engines for blast furnaces, with one or two extremely large cylinders and powered by the burning of furnace gas. These, particularly those built by Körting, used double-acting cylinders. Gas engines require little or no compression of their charge, in comparison to petrol or compression-ignition engines, and so the double-acting cylinder designs were still adequate, despite their narrow, convoluted passageways.

Double-acting cylinders have been infrequently used for internal combustion engines since, although Burmeister & Wain made 2-stroke cycle double-acting (2-SCDA) diesels for marine propulsion before 1930. The first, of 7,000 hp, was fitted in the British MV Amerika (United Baltic Co.) in 1929. The two B&W SCDA engines fitted to the MV Stirling Castle in 1937 produced 24,000 hp each.

==== USS Pompano ====
In 1935 the US submarine USS Pompano was ordered as part of the Perch class. (Note: Alden gives these as the Porpoise, Shark and Perch classes. Wikipedia's article considers them the P-1, P-3 & P-5 sub-types of a single Porpoise class) Six boats were built, with three different diesel engine designs from different makers. Pompano was fitted with H.O.R. (Hooven-Owens-Rentschler) 8-cylinder double-acting engines that were a licence-built version of the MAN auxiliary engines of the cruiser Leipzig. Owing to the limited space available within the submarines, either opposed-piston, or, in this case, double-acting engines were favoured for being more compact. Pompano's engines were a complete failure and were wrecked during trials before even leaving the Mare Island Navy Yard. Pompano was laid up for eight months until 1938 while the engines were replaced. Even then the engines were regarded as unsatisfactory and were replaced by Fairbanks-Morse engines in 1942. While Pompano was still being built, the Salmon-class submarines were ordered. Three of these were built by Electric Boat, with a 9-cylinder development of the H.O.R. engine. Although not as great a failure as Pompano's engines, this version was still troublesome and the boats were later re-engined with the same single-acting General Motors 16-248 V16 engines as their sister boats. Other Electric Boat-constructed submarines of the Sargo and Seadragon classes, as well as the first few of the Gato class, were also built with these 9-cylinder H.O.R. engines, but later re-engined.

== Hydraulic cylinders ==
Double-acting hydraulic cylinder

A hydraulic cylinder is a mechanical actuator that is powered by a pressurised liquid, typically oil. It has many applications, notably in construction equipment (engineering vehicles), manufacturing machinery, and civil engineering.
