= Birmingham Dribbler =

Early type of model railway locomotive

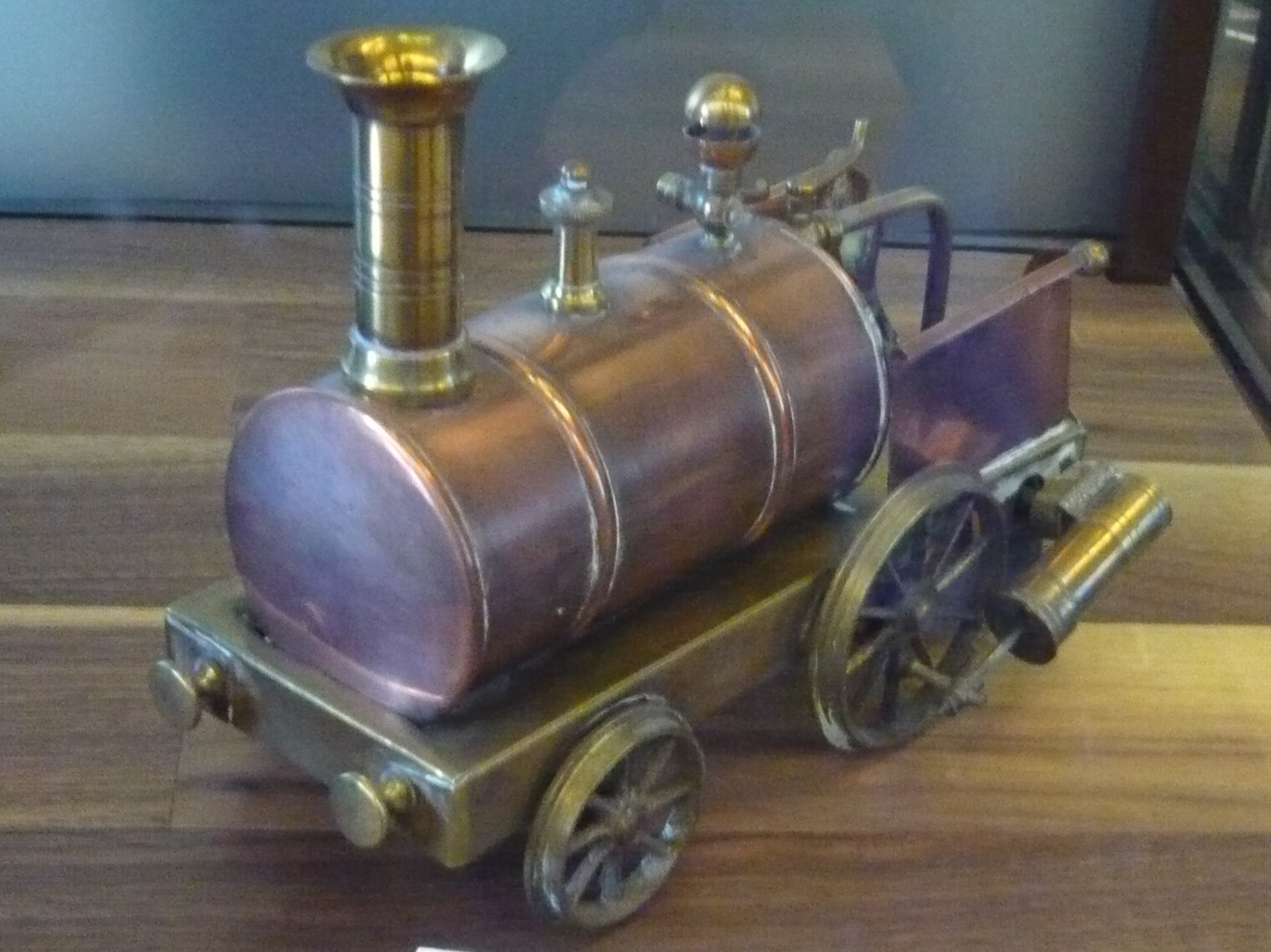
A 'Birmingham Dribbler', Stevens's Model Dockyard, England, around 1890

A Birmingham Dribbler, or a carpet railway describes a type of very early model railway. It is a bit of a misnomer, as the railway featured a miniature scale model live steam railway locomotive, but had no track – the locomotive was simply run across the floor. In some cases, the front wheels were even made steerable so that the engine could be run in a circle without track. Evidence is required of individual examples, but it is believed they first appeared in the 1850s and became generally popular in the latter part of the 19th through to the early 20th century.

The steam locomotives were very simple, usually made in brass, with a pair of simple oscillating cylinders driving the main wheels. They were basically a boiler mounted on wheels, although simple decoration (usually bands of lacquer) was sometimes applied. Track was not used – the boiler was filled with water, the burner lit, and when steam was being produced, the locomotive was placed on the floor and allowed to run until either the water or fuel ran out or the engine crashed into furniture, walls or other objects. Very quickly, after a number had exploded, simple safety valves were fitted.

They quickly gained the nickname of Birmingham Dribblers (or sometimes "Piddlers"), as large numbers of them were manufactured in Birmingham, England, and they had the unfortunate habit of leaving a trail of water behind them as they ran on the floor. Very often this trail would be mixed with the fuel used for the burner, and there were numerous incidents of building fires caused by the locomotive crashing into furniture, walls or other objects and overturning so that the burning fuel was spilled all over the floor. As time passed, embellishments were added, such as wooden buffer beams, buffers and steam whistles.

== Recent models ==
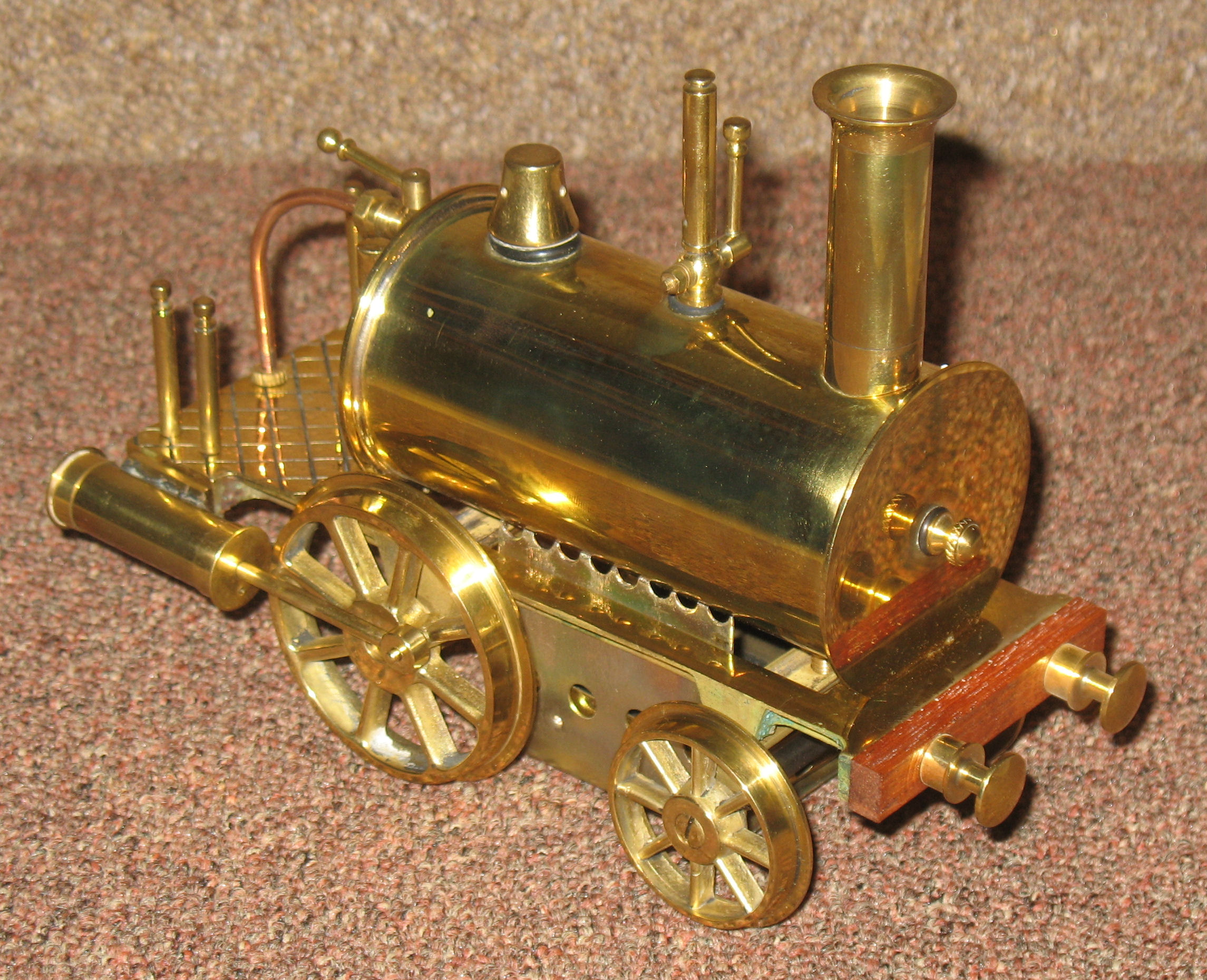
A modern (c1978?) reproduction of a "Birmingham Dribbler" steam engine, made by Maxwell Hemmens.

Not all Birmingham Dribblers are Victorian antiques. In the late 1970s to 1990s, a brass, self-assembly kit for a Birmingham Dribbler model was manufactured by Maxwell Hemmens Precision Steam Models of Yorkshire, UK. Completed models are still available from John Hemmens.

== See also ==
- Live Steam & Outdoor Railroading
- Model engineering
- Model steam engine
- Railway modelling
- Rail transport modelling scales
