= Super 7 =

Super 7 may refer to:

- Super7, Indonesian boy band
- Lotto Super 7, a former Canadian lottery game (its final drawing was September 18, 2009)
- Lotus Seven, a kit car produced by Lotus
- Super Contra 7, a bootleg game based on Super Contra
- Super Socket 7, a CPU socket
- Tarzan and the Super 7, an animated television series also later known as Batman and the Super 7
- Los Super Seven, a Latin American music group
- Super 7, a lathe manufactured by Myford
- Super-7, a line of rebuilt railroad locomotives marketed by GE Transportation
- Super 7, a Pennsylvania Lottery game offered from 1986 to 1995; brought back in 2009 in a modified version
- Super 7, an early name for the CAC/PAC JF-17 Thunder fighter aircraft
- Super 7, the football championship games for the Alabama High School Athletic Association
