= 7 1/4 in gauge railway =

Miniature railway track gauge

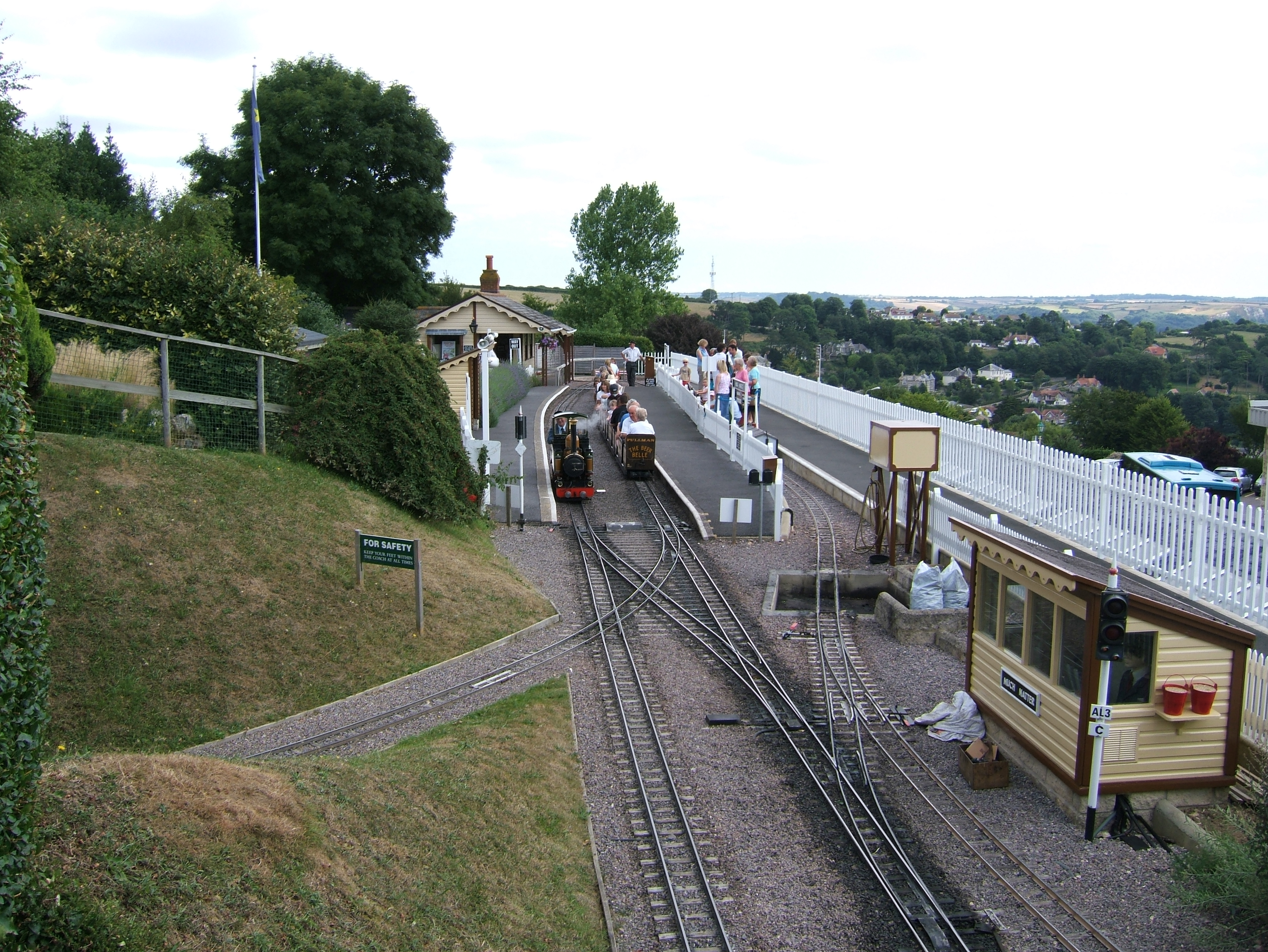
Steam locomotive running round its train on the Beer Heights Light Railway, Devon, England

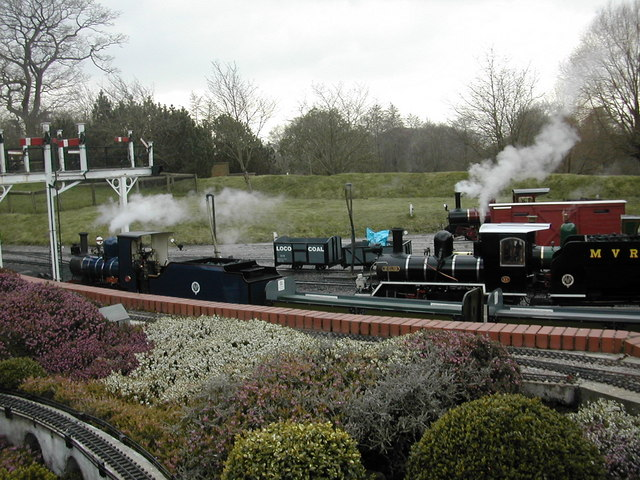
The Moors Valley Railway, Dorset, England

A 7 1/4-inch gauge railway is a miniature railway that uses the gauge of 7 1/4 in (184 mm). It is mainly used in clubs, amusement parks and as a backyard railway.

Locomotives include steam, electric and diesel types. Most are built to an individual design but some are built from kits.

7 1/4 in (184 mm) gauge railways are owned by clubs or can be privately owned.

== See also ==
- Live steam
- List of ridable miniature railways
