= Train ride =

Amusement ride consisting of small trains

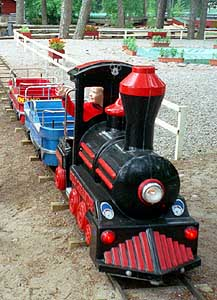
A kiddie ride in Hanko, Finland

A train ride or miniature train consists of miniature trains capable of carrying people. Some are considered amusement rides and some are located in amusement parks and municipal parks. Backyard railroads, ridable miniature railways, and large amusement railways run on tracks, and especially if the service is provided by a non-commercial hobbyist club, their trains may be exact scale models, often with a live steam locomotive. Some train rides are kiddie rides, which are commercial children's rides that often use simple, colorful equipment with the driving mechanism hidden under vacuum-formed plastic covers. Trackless trains do not use tracks and usually consist of railroad-like cars towed behind an ordinary, or modified motor vehicle. This type of ride is often used for sightseeing tours. Some roller coasters like the Big Thunder Mountain Railroad attractions in several Disney parks resemble train rides, but may not be available to children under a certain age or minimum height.

== History ==
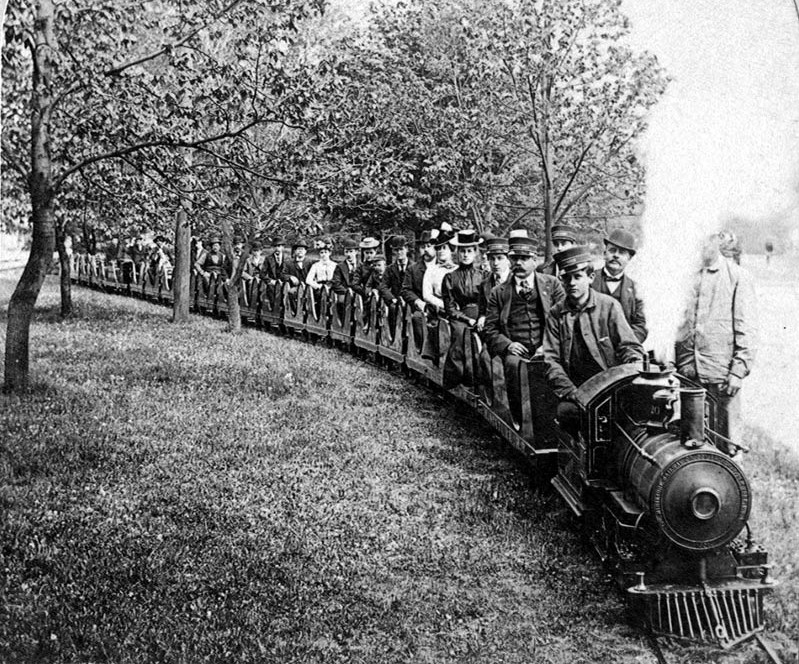
Miniature Railway Company train at the Pan-American Exposition in 1901

One of the earliest manufacturers of train rides were the Cagney Brothers, who began making miniature steam locomotives in 1894. They incorporated the Miniature Railway Company in 1898.

Another early maker of miniature train rides was Paul Allen Sturtevant, who began building model trains as rides for children in the 1930s. Sturtevant began this craft as a hobby, later making them for rental to department stores and eventually producing them in a plant in Addison, Illinois until the demands of World War II shifted production away from consumer goods.

== Gallery ==
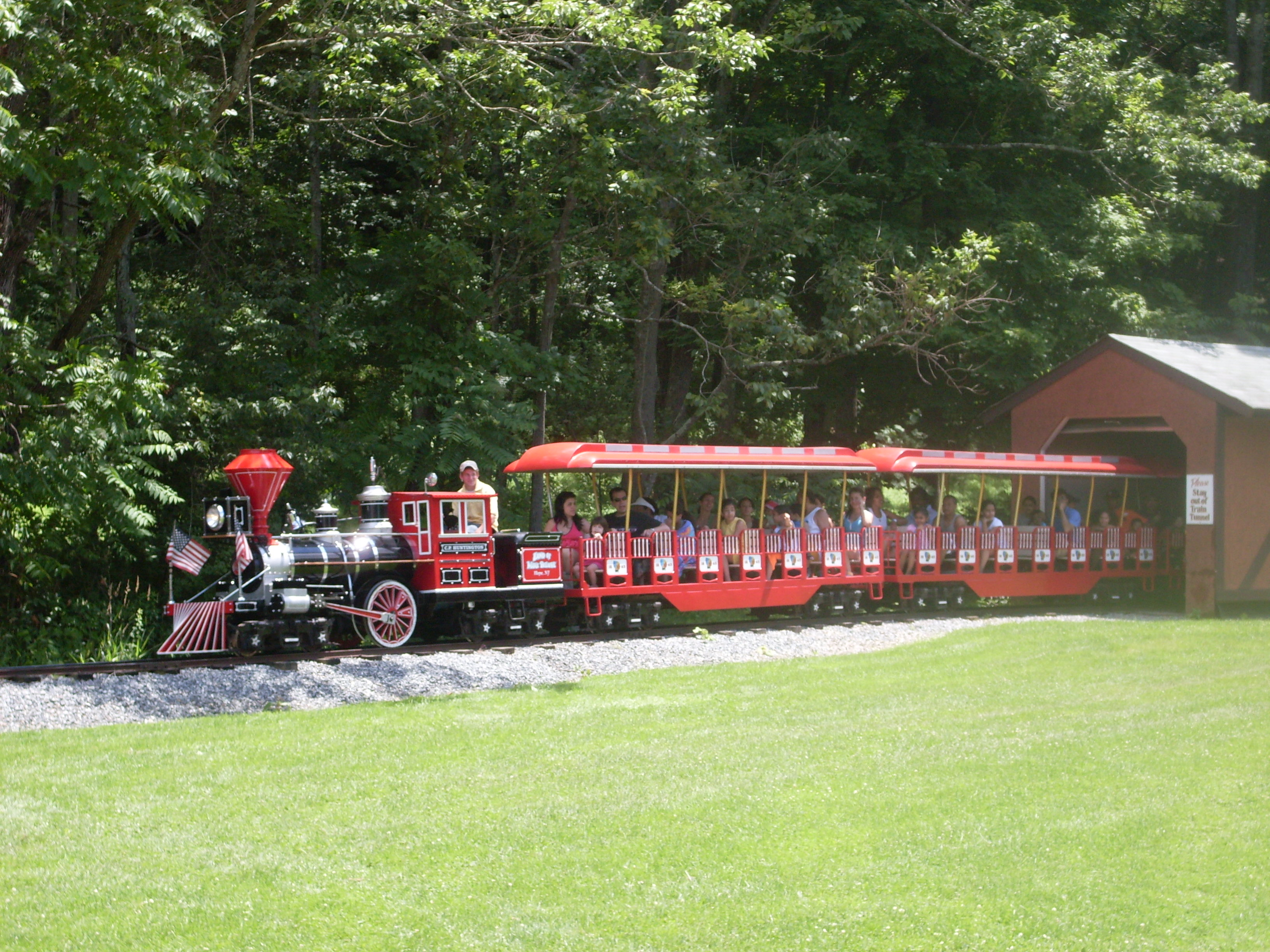
The Civil War Train Ride at Land of Make Believe amusement park, Hope Township, New Jersey, United States

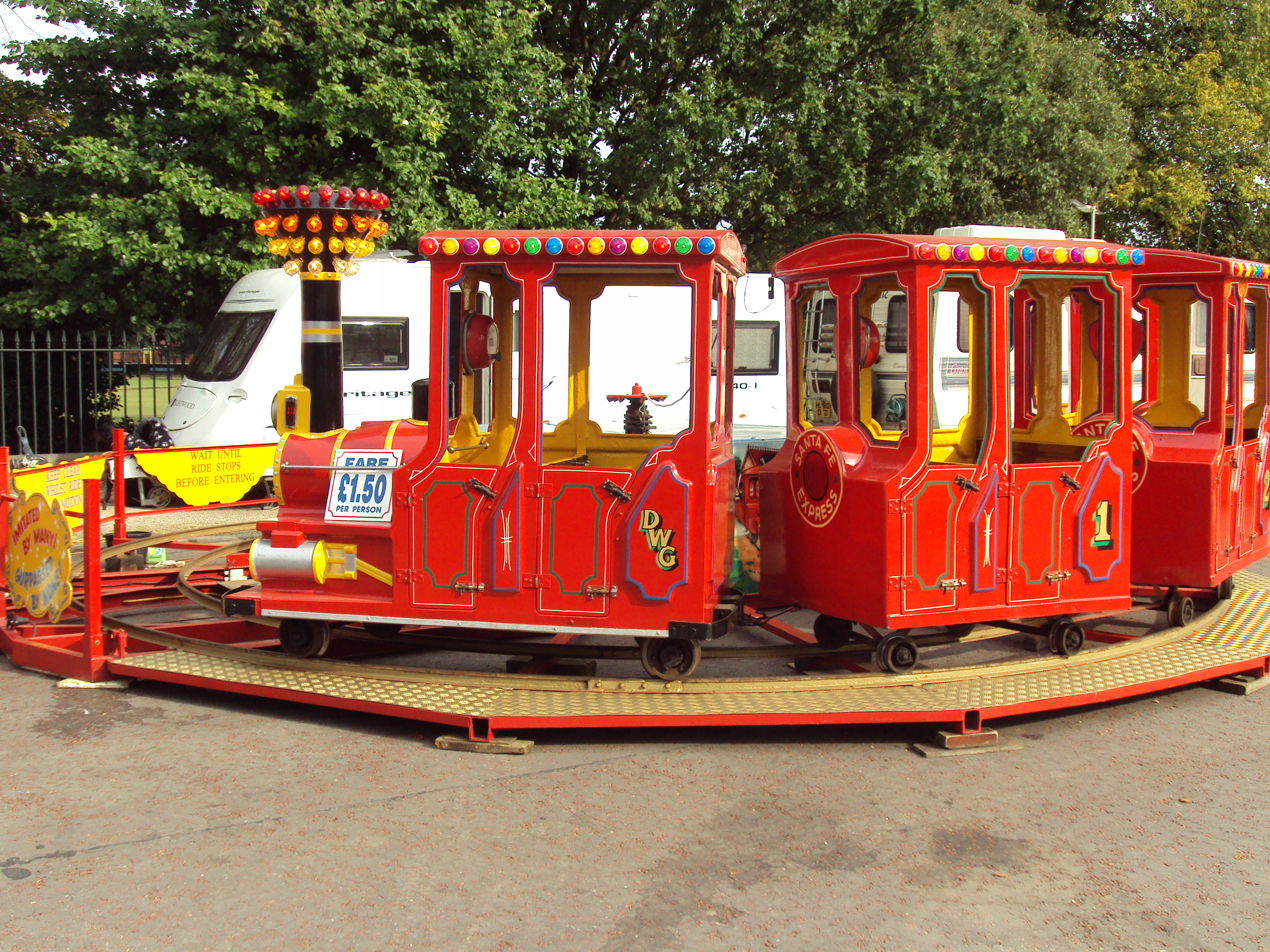
A children's train ride in Birkenhead Park in the United Kingdom

== See also ==
- Amusement rides on the National Register of Historic Places
- Rail transport in Walt Disney Parks and Resorts
