= Model engineering =

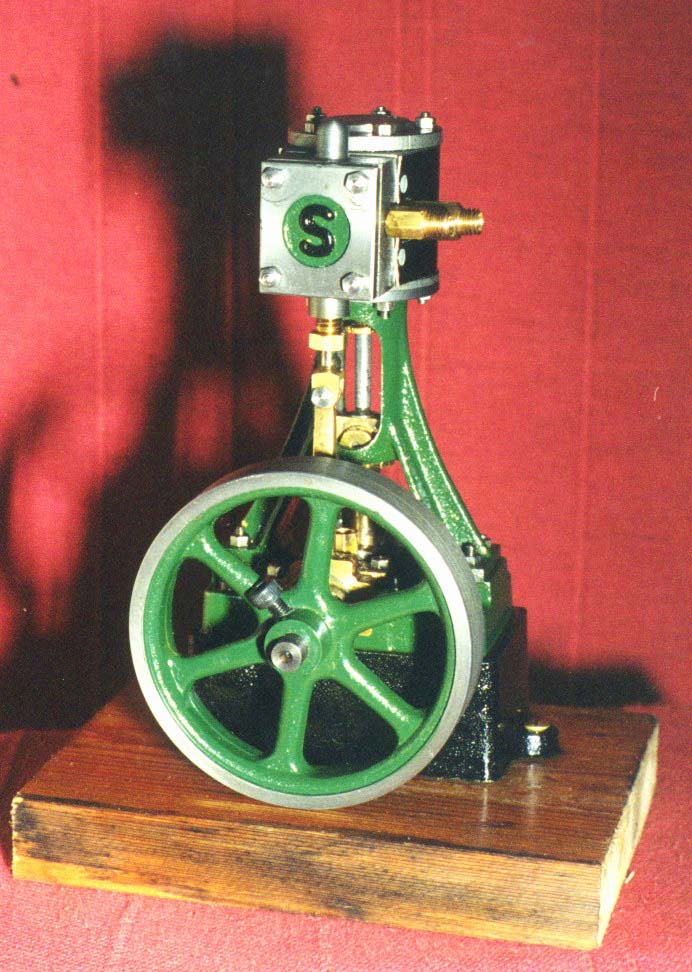
Stuart Turner No.10 V, built from castings. A typical beginner's project.

Model engineering is the pursuit of constructing proportionally scaled miniature working representations of full-sized machines. It is a branch of metalworking with a strong emphasis on artisanry, as opposed to mass production. While now mainly a hobby, in the past it also had commercial and industrial purpose. The term 'model engineering' was in use by 1888. In the United States, the term 'home shop machinist' is often used instead, although arguably the scope of this term is broader.

Model engineering is most popular in the industrialised countries that have an engineering heritage extending back to the days of steam power. That is, it is a pursuit principally found in the UK, US, northwestern European countries and the industrialised British Commonwealth countries.

== Scope of model engineering ==
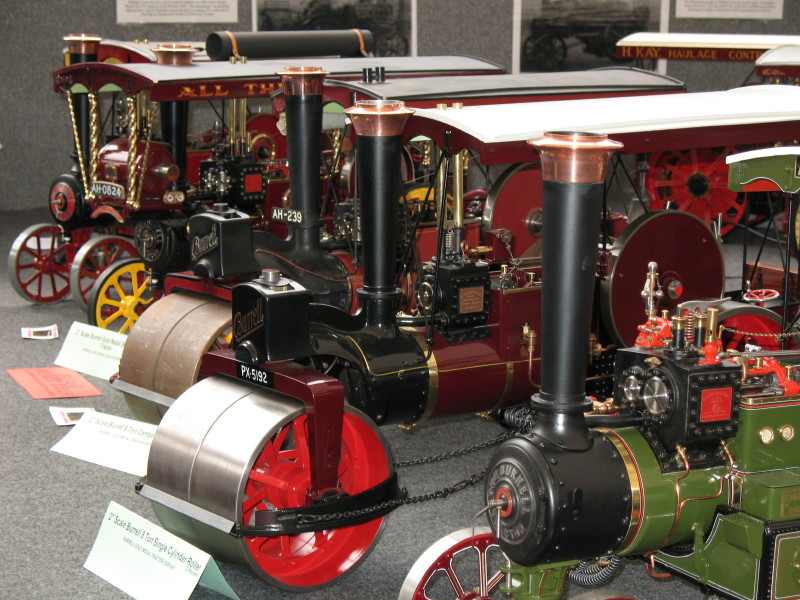
2" Scale Steam roller and traction engine models on display at Midland Model Engineering 2007

The 'classic' areas of model engineering interest are live steam models (typically steam locomotives, stationary engines, marine steam engines, Showman's engines, and traction engines), internal combustion engines, and clock making. Other popular subjects are Stirling engines, workshop equipment, miniature machine tools and ornamental turning. These constitute stable genres which are often reflected in competition categories at model engineering exhibitions. In the past, amateur electrical experimentation (the precursor to hobby electronics) and ship modelling were considered as part of model engineering, but these are no longer regarded as core genres.

Model engineers typically make models by machining working parts from stock metal and metal castings. Some models are intended as utilitarian working models, others as highly meticulous display models, or sometimes a combination of both. The most elaborate models involve hand manufacture of thousands of parts, taking thousands of hours to complete, often over a number of years or even decades. The model engineer is often guided by commercially available drawings, however some draw their own designs, or even work without drawings. Similarly, most model engineers will buy castings when required, but some buy or make foundry equipment to cast metal themselves.

Increasingly, 'modern' technologies such as Computer aided design, cnc (computer numerical control) equipment, laser cutting, 3D printing and embedded systems are becoming part of the hobby as more and more of its practitioners have developed skills and familiarity with these techniques through their work, whilst younger people familiar with newer processes discover the potential of traditional machining, narrowing the gap between 'model engineering' and 'maker culture'.

As an activity that involves extensive use of metalwork machine tools in a home workshop-based context, model engineering overlaps with other artisanal machine-tool based and allied metalwork pursuits including gunsmithing (particularly in the USA), manufacture of home metalworking tools and accessories, home cnc equipment building, antique machine tool collecting, antique vehicle and machine restoration, home welding and hobby metalcasting. Model engineering is closely associated with the hobby of running live steam locomotives, and overlaps to a degree with the making of non-working models, particularly those of mechanical subjects. Products such as Meccano and low-pressure toy steam engines have a loose affinity with model engineering, stemming from the production of scientific and mechanical toys beginning in the late 18th century. Steam Punk, a post-industrial sculptural art style picking up on the aesthetic and kinetic qualities of old machinery, shares some overlap.

There is some debate about the appropriateness of the term 'model engineering'. Some argue that the term 'engineer' should be reserved solely for those professionally qualified as such. However, the historic meaning of 'engineer' is one who constructs or tends engines, and as such is a fitting epithet for those who make working models as a hobby. In any case, since the term 'model engineer' was employed by 1888, the precedent for its use has long been a fait accompli.

== Model live steam locomotives ==
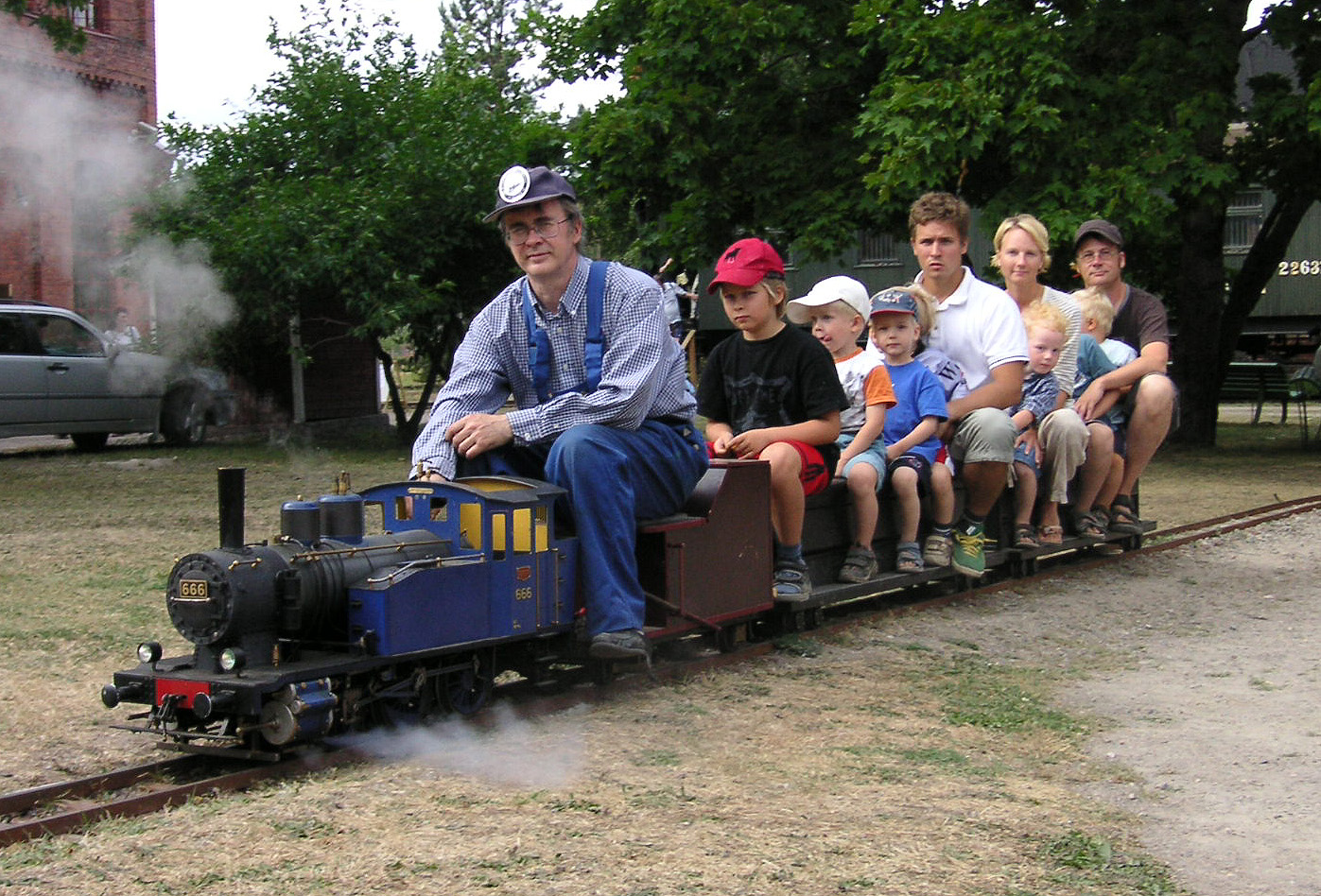
A more demanding model engineering project, a propane fired 1:8 scale live steam train, running on the Finnish Railway Museum's miniature 7.25 in (184 mm) track.

Model live steam locomotives predominate as the most popular modelling subject in model engineering. As such they deserve special mention. Live steam refers to the use of pressurised steam, heated in the model locomotive's own boiler, to turn the wheels via miniature steam cylinders. Not all locomotives are live steam - some model engineers make model locomotives powered by electricity or internal combustion engines. The criteria however is that the model is self-propelled, hence requiring an engine to be made or motor to be installed, as opposed to the (usually much smaller) model trains that rely on an electrified track to run.

Live steam (and other self-propelled) locomotives are made in a range of sizes, or scales, according to track gauge. The smaller gauges, sometimes called 'garden gauges' because they can be set up in the owner's own garden, or in the US called a backyard railroad, are sufficient to run by themselves but usually cannot haul the driver or passengers. The larger gauges are usually found on club tracks or miniature railways, and are intended to haul the driver and passengers.

Popular 'garden gauges' are '0' gauge, '1' gauge and 2½" gauge (ridable). Usual club track gauges are 3½", 5" and 7¼", and 4¾" and 7½" in North America. Larger miniature railway gauges such as 10¼" and 15" gauge are more common in zoo and park settings or as public passenger-hauling lines such as the Romney, Hythe & Dymchurch Railway. Various gauges have existed over time. 3½" and 5" gauge were proposed in 1898 as standard model gauges, although 5" gauge only became popular after the Second World War, along with 7¼" gauge.

Not all enthusiasts of model live steam locomotive are model engineers and vice versa. Some live steam enthusiasts primarily operate locomotives on track and therefore purchase a ready made model, while other focus on constructing locomotives themselves and derive satisfaction from the process of building a functioning engine.

== Model engineering in society ==
Model engineering in 1866. Apprentice mechanic John Satchell poses with his father and his medal-winning model shunting locomotive at the 1866-67 Intercolonial Exhibition, Victoria, Australia. Image: Museum of Victoria ST037829

The aim of model engineering to build mechanical models is now usually purely recreational, although beginning with the Industrial Revolution in the late 18th century through to the late 20th century such models were widely produced as aids to technical education, either as apprentice projects or as classroom or public institutional exhibits. They were also produced as commercial props to support a patent, to visualise a proposed capital venture, or to advertise a manufacturer's trade. Many museums in the old industrialised countries house original collections of mechanical models stemming from the earliest days of the industrial revolution. One of the earliest known models of a steam engine, that of a Newcomen beam engine, was made prior to 1763. The Science Museum, London published catalogues illustrating many early models. Many of these models represent the same subjects that remain popular with model engineers today, which attests to the long tradition of model engineering.

The earliest publication to offer instruction to the public on building working steam engine models was the Model Dockyard Handy-book (2nd edition 1867) by E. Bell, proprietor of the Model Dockyard shop in London, which also offered the parts and completed models for sale. Bell was, he said, "Ship Modeller and Mechanist" to the Royal Family, the English Admiralty and various European royalty. The book was aimed at building and operating these models as a recreational pursuit. In Britain, the establishment of a broad middle class by the late nineteenth century, an associated widening of leisure pursuits, and the rise of the Arts and Crafts movement that valorized handicrafts, saw a new constituency of amateur model engineers and experimenters interested in metalwork as a recreation. This was at a time when mechanical technology was seen as the driving force in rising economic prosperity. Articles and advertisements relating to model engineering began to appear in Amateur Work Illustrated magazine in the mid-1880s. With the rise of 'amateur' interest in conjunction with the working class mechanics who made models as apprentices, a new market niche was emerging, capitalised upon by Percival Marshall who began publishing Model Engineer and Amateur Electrician magazine in 1898 (now Model Engineer). Common interest in model engineering between men of lower, middle and even upper classes supported claims that model engineering had broken class barriers. However, a tradition that still persists is the use of pseudonyms in the model engineering press, as it was once considered inappropriate for professional gentlemen to contribute to "amateur" journals. Another reason was to disguise the fact that one contributor was single-handedly writing an entire edition of a journal on occasion, notably Edgar T. Westbury, who used no less than four noms de plume.

Model engineering remains popular despite major social changes over the past century. Among these changes have been the elimination of steam power (still the most favourite subject for model engineers) from rail transport and industry; and the widespread de-industrialisation of Western countries beginning in the 1970s, along with a shift to consumer society and the introduction of a wide new range of competing leisure pursuits. These changes, along with the older age of many model engineers and decline of new apprenticeships, have prompted a long-running debate among model engineers whether the hobby will die out.

Model engineers often join to form model engineering clubs and societies. The first of these to form was the Society of Model and Experimental Engineers based in London, UK, in 1898, "along similar lines to the model yachting clubs" then popular. By 1948, "well over a hundred local clubs and societies" had been formed. Model engineering clubs and societies now number in the hundreds across the UK, Canada, Australia, South Africa, New Zealand, Netherlands, Switzerland and elsewhere. These clubs are a form of civil society organisation, which are a sign of healthy democracy and community cohesion.

A major focus for many of these clubs is the operation of a club track or miniature railway for members' model live steam locomotives. These tracks are often run publicly and form part of community recreational and tourism infrastructure in their local area. Model engineering clubs and societies often cater too for model engineering interests beyond locomotives. Due to the inherently dangerous nature of live steam, clubs and societies are responsible for administering safety regulations, insurance and specialist boiler codes that cover both members and the public. To this end, model engineering clubs and societies often affiliate into national bodies that can lobby government to maintain the historical privilege they have to self-regulate their own safety standards.

Livelihoods based on model engineering include retailers who provide model engineers with equipment and supplies, small fabrication services who produce castings, make miniature live steam boilers and live steam kit parts (or even whole running models), commercial publishers in the model engineering press, and a very few professional model engineers who make one-off models by commission for private or institutional collectors. Most model engineers however are amateur constructors who rely on other income.

== Notable model engineers ==
Each year, many local and regional model engineering shows and exhibitions are held wherever clubs are found, which recognize the best work of model engineers. The largest exhibitions are held in London, Harrogate and Bristol in the UK. In the UK, the Duke of Edinburgh Challenge Trophy, awarded annually at the Model Engineer Exhibition, reflects some of the best of the hobby. Pre-eminent among the Trophy's recipients is nine-time winner Cherry Hill. On the web, the quality of some modern model engineers' work is celebrated at The Internet Craftsmanship Museum.

Many of the best-known names in model engineering are of those who wrote prolifically in the model engineering press. Henry Greenly may be the first notable model engineer, being founding editor of Model Railways and Locomotives Magazine in 1902 and author of Model Engineering and related books. Greenly produced a number of designs for spirit-fuelled model locomotives, which however could not haul passengers. Arguably the most notable model engineer of all was the obscure 'LBSC' (Lillian "Curly" Lawrence). His most significant contribution was to overturn Greenly's prevailing orthodoxy and demonstrate that model locomotives of even small gauge (2½") could be powerful enough to haul passengers, by using miniature coal-fired firetube boilers, as were used in full-size locomotives. From 1923 until his death in 1967 he popularized passenger-hauling miniature live steam locomotives that could be built with minimal equipment, by publishing over 50 locomotive designs in various gauges, serialized mostly in Model Engineer magazine.

Many other model engineers have contributed numerous designs notable for their enduring popularity. Prior to the appearance of Engineering in Miniature magazine in 1979 and Model Engineers' Workshop in 1990, these authors wrote almost exclusively in Model Engineer. Among these, Edgar T. Westbury produced many internal combustion engine designs, W.J. Hughes designed many agricultural and traction engine models. Colonel C. E. Bowden will be remembered as one of the most prolific experimenters with model aircraft, model boats and radio control, particularly his successes in powered model flight co-operating with E. T. Westbury, who made the Atom Minor engine that powered several of his early models. Martin Evans produced a great many more model locomotive designs, George H. Thomas specialised in designs for workshop accessories, Tubal Cain (T. D. Walshaw) developed a number of stationary engine designs, and Claude B. Reeve produced many clock designs. Ian Bradley and Norman Hallows wrote individually and together under the pen-name of Duplex on a wide range of topics, notably finely finished and ingenious tooling. Don Young contributed locomotive designs to Model Engineer and then published his own quarterly live steam magazine Locomotives Large and Small from 1979 until his death in 1994. More recently, Kozo Hiraoka has authored several series of logging locomotive articles in the U.S. magazine Live Steam. Cherry Hill was notable for her small-scale working models of unusual early steam vehicles.

== Tools and equipment for model engineering ==
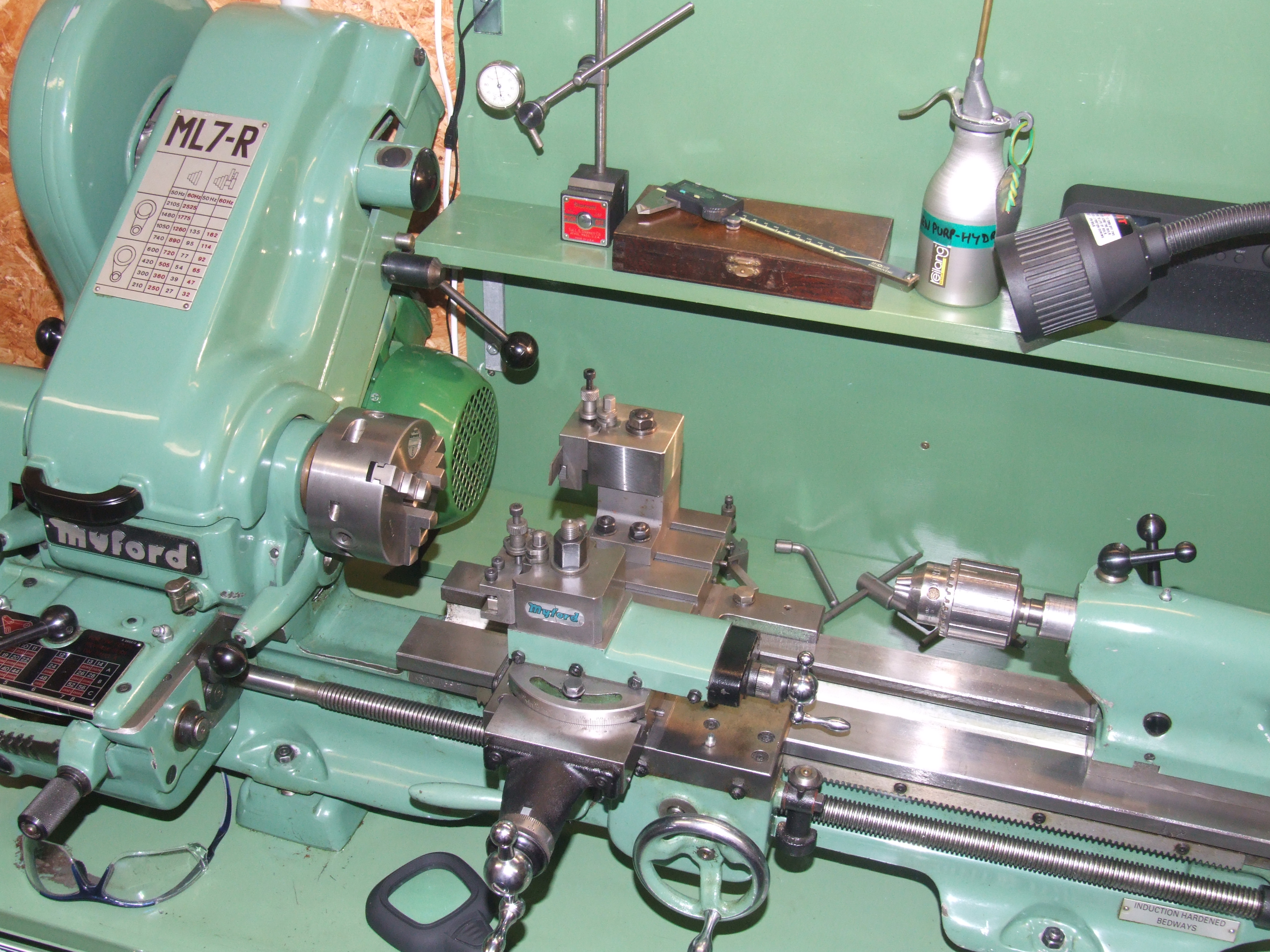
A typical small metal-turning lathe, as used by model engineers.

Machine tools used for model engineering include the lathe, the mill, the shaper, and the drill press. Until the introduction from Asia of relatively cheap machinery, beginning in the 1980s, UK or US made machine tools produced by Myford, South bend, Bridgeport and other now-defunct Western companies were fairly ubiquitous in model engineering. These days model engineers have a choice of new budget-made Asian machinery, the restoration of 'old iron' (used machinery made to high standards in the former Western industrial centres), or, if money is not an issue, new high-end machinery from the few remaining Western manufacturers. These machines only become truly useful once the model engineer accumulates a large set of associated tooling (such as drills, reamers, collets, etc.) that, all up, may cost more than the larger items of machinery. Model engineers often economise by making items of tooling themselves.

Although traditionally a manual hobby, that is, one that relies on the model engineer hand-making the parts with the assistance of manually operated machinery, computerised tools are becoming popular with some model engineers. Designs are now often produced with the aid of CAD software. Some model engineers use 3D CAD software to build the model in virtual space before commencing on the physical model. Such CAD software also interfaces with CNC machinery, particularly milling machines, of which an increasing range is now aimed at model engineers and other 'home shop machinists', making it possible for some model components to be manufactured under computer control. 3D printing is another technology for model engineers to explore. Model engineering continues to expand by incorporating new technologies including laser cutting, 3D printing and embedded electronics establishing more and more common ground with the maker movement, these computerised pursuits are a sub-branch of model engineering and are not followed by the majority.

== Model engineering kits ==
Kits of parts offer a shortcut to the traditional method of building. Kits fall into two categories, machined and unmachined kits. Unmachined kits usually consist of drawings, castings, stock metal, and possibly fasteners and other fixings necessary to complete the model. They require machining facilities to complete and often also require additional components and raw materials. Typically the minimum machine requirements are a lathe, drilling machine, and possibly a milling machine. A good level of knowledge about machining is necessary to successfully complete these kits. Machined kits are a set of parts that are fully machined and only require finishing with hand tools, painting, and assembly. Workshop machinery is not required. The kit will typically contain all the parts necessary to complete the model. These kits require a lot less work than an unmachined kit, but are very expensive and choice of subject matter is limited.

== Information sources for model engineering ==
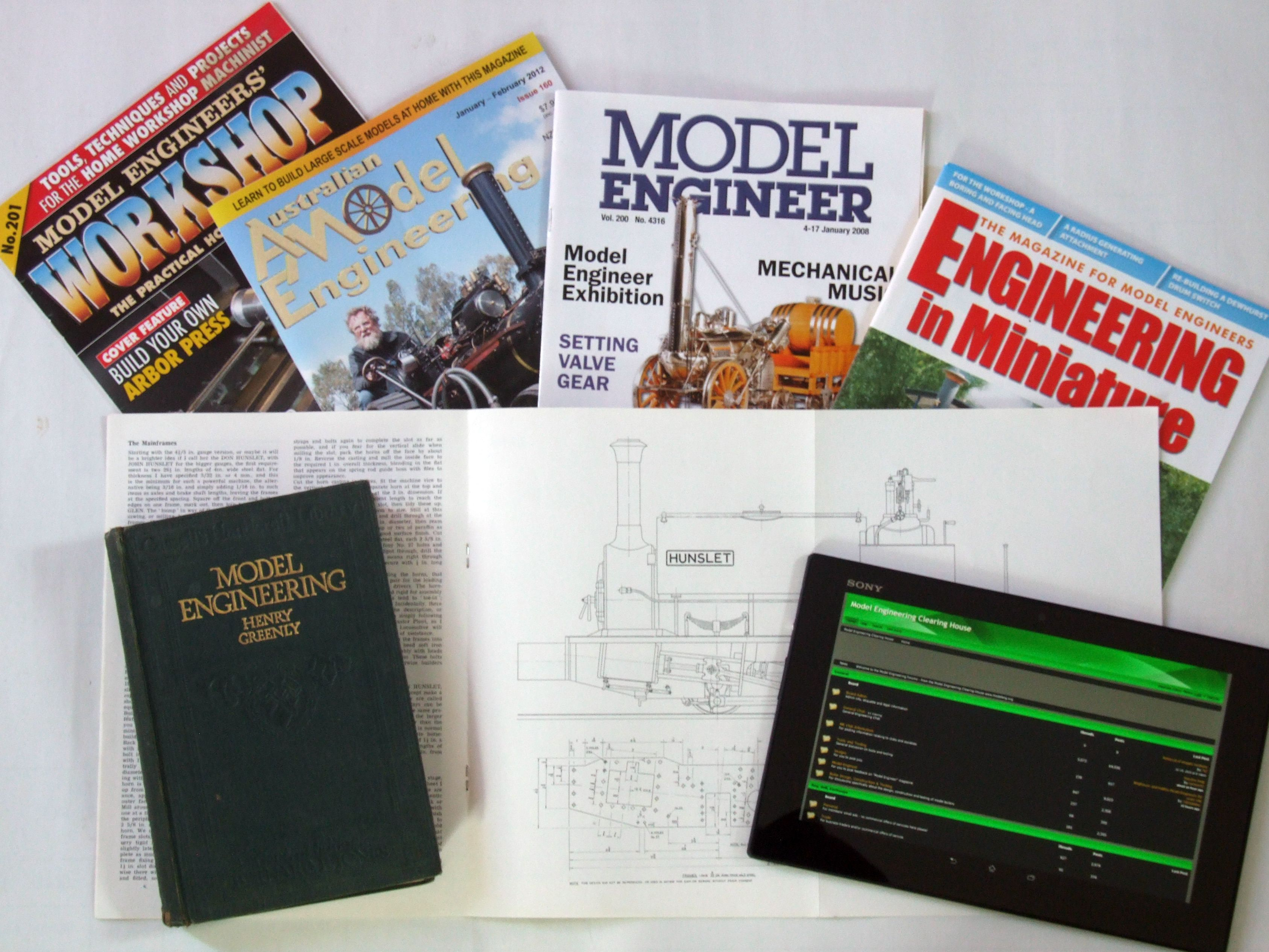
Examples of model engineering media: magazines, books and internet.

There are many books, magazines and internet forums about model engineering. Magazines such as Model Engineer and Live Steam remain the main source of detailed designs and plans (in addition to carrying news items and discussion of products and techniques). These detailed designs and plans contain instructions and drawings sufficient to build a particular model. In the pages of magazine back-issues, hundreds of such designs exist for all sorts of models. Many of the plans are also reprinted by plans services and model engineering suppliers. Books tend to discuss techniques (sometimes with detailed designs and plans), and forums are active in problem-solving and general discussion. There are also many model engineers' websites or blogs that feature their owners' current and past projects. Some model engineering webzines also exist.

Annual model engineering shows and exhibitions are held around the world, organized either by local and regional clubs or professional exhibition firms. The largest exhibitions are held in London, Doncaster (previously at Harrogate), and Bristol in the UK; York, Pennsylvania in the US; and Karlsruhe in Germany. The [Miniature Engineering Craftsmanship Museum in Carlsbad, California (USA) has a permanent collection of exhibits.

== Published designs and availability ==
In progress

Gauge/Scale	Designer	Design Name	Availability
7 1/4"	Kennions	Tich	Drawings/Castings - kennions
7 1/4"	Kennions	1366	Drawings/Castings - kennions
5"	Kennions	Tich	Drawings/Castings - kennions
5"		Butch	
5"		Chub	
5"		Firefly	
5"		Peggy	
5"		Compbyne	
5"		Salisbury	
5"		Nine Elms	
5"	LBSC	Pansy	
5"	Martin Evans	Simplex	
5"	Martin Evans	Springbok	
5"		4300	
5"		4700	
5"		Dean Goods	
5"		City of Truro	
5"		Dholpur	
5"		Twin Sisters	
5"		King John	
5"	LBSC	Maid of Kent	

== See also ==
- Metalworking
- Machining
- Machine tool
- Steam engine
- Model building
- Model steam engine
- Model engine
- Glow engine
- Carbureted compression ignition model engine
- Ridable miniature railway
