= Oscillating cylinder steam engine =

Steam-engine design which does not require a valve gear

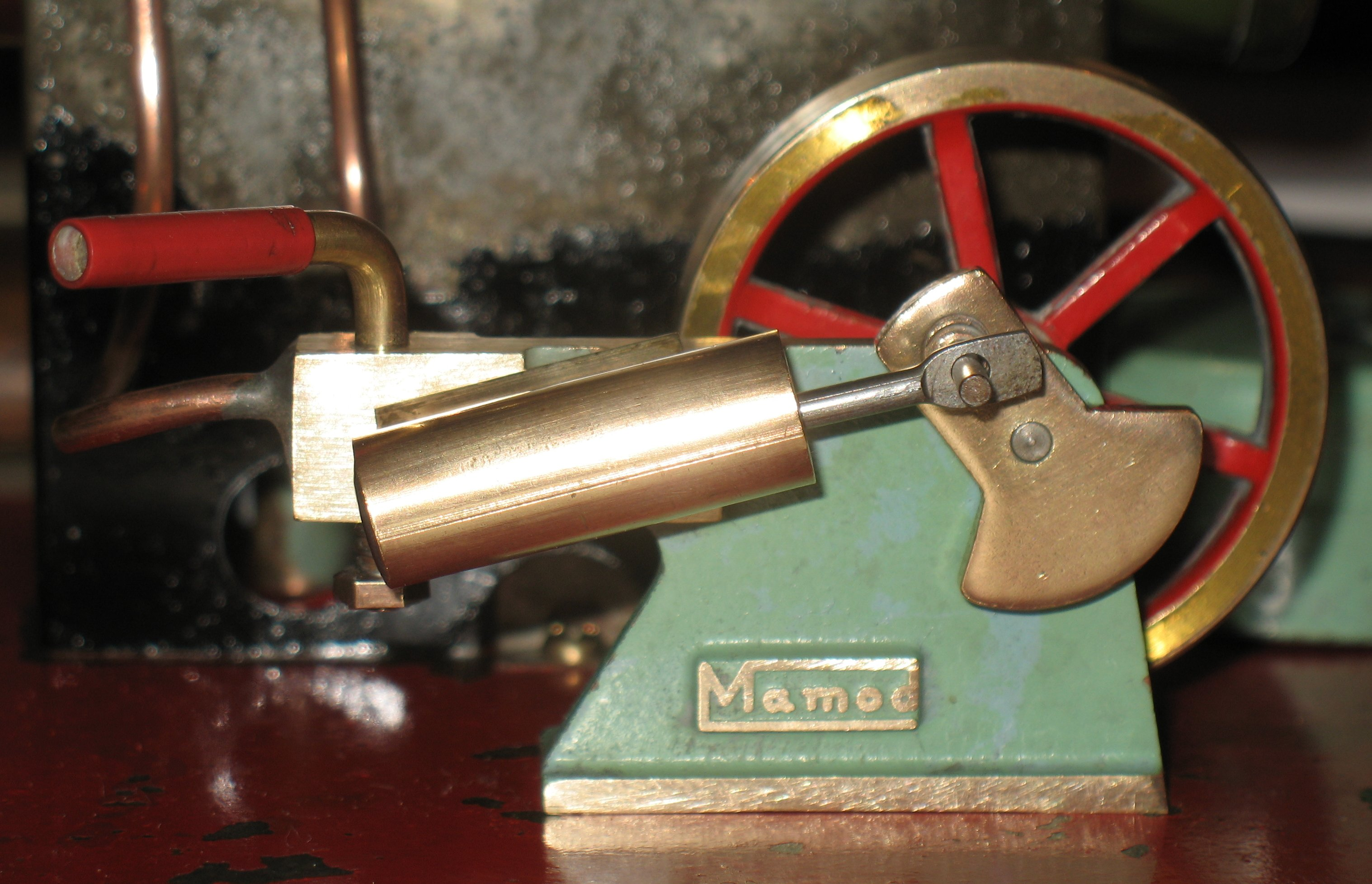
A simple oscillating cylinder engine, part of a Mamod SE2 working steam model

An oscillating cylinder steam engine (also known as a wobbler in the US) is a simple steam-engine design (proposed by William Murdoch at the end of 18th century) that requires no valve gear. Instead the cylinder rocks, or oscillates, as the crank moves the piston, pivoting in the mounting trunnion so that ports in the cylinder line up with ports in a fixed port face alternately to direct steam into or out of the cylinder.

Oscillating cylinder steam engines are now mainly used in toys and models but, in the past, have been used in full-size working engines, mainly on ships and small stationary engines. They have the advantage of simplicity and, therefore, low manufacturing costs. They also tend to be more compact than other types of cylinder of the same capacity, which makes them advantageous for use in ships.

== Operation ==
Operation of a simple oscillating cylinder steam engine

The steam needs to be fed into the end of the cylinder at just the right time in the cycle to push the piston in the correct direction. In the other direction, the steam needs to be allowed to escape from the cylinder. As the crankshaft rotates, the piston rod moves up and down (or side to side in the case of a vertical cylinder) as well as in and out. Because the piston rod is rigid and the piston itself is long relative to its diameter, this causes the cylinder to rock, or "oscillate" on its special mounting (trunnion). In the design usually found in a toy or model engine, a hole in the side of the cylinder (one at each end for a double-acting cylinder) and a pair of holes in the port block are arranged so that this rocking motion lines up the holes at the correct times, allowing steam to enter the cylinder in one direction and to escape into the atmosphere or condenser in the other direction.

In full-size engines, the steam and exhaust ports are usually built into the pivot (trunnion) mounting. However, separate valves may be provided, controlled by the oscillating motion. This allows the cutoff timing to be varied to enable expansive working. Alternatively, expansive working can also be provided by means of Woolf compounding, just as compactly if the two expansion stages are provided on either side of a single piston within a single cylinder, all arranged as a trunk engine (however, an oscillating cylinder engine does not benefit from the advantage of compactness that a trunk engine would otherwise provide, as it has that already from its own design features). Each approach to expansive working compromises the advantage of simplicity but still retains the advantage of compactness.

== Reversing ==
An oscillating cylinder engine cannot be reversed by means of the valve linkage (as in a normal fixed cylinder) because there is none. Reversing of the engine can be achieved by reversing the steam connections between inlet and exhaust or, in the case of small engines, by shifting the trunnion pivot point so that the port in the cylinder lines up with a different pair of ports in the port face. In the latter case, the fixed port face is usually provided with three ports, the central one being the steam feed and the outer two being exhausts, only one of which being in use at any time, depending on the required direction of running.

== Marine ==
Early proposals for marine use of oscillating steam engine were made already in the late 18th century. In 1822 the first iron-built steam ship, Aaron Manby, was completed, using 80-hp oscillating engines. In 1827 Joseph Maudslay patented an independently developed marine oscillating engine, with an improved valve gear. More improvements were made by English engineer John Penn, followed by introduction of 3-cylinder version by Scottish John Scott Russell in 1853.

Early on shipbuilders considered the moving parts of the oscillating engine a hazard, inside the small spaces of a ship. However, later the popularity of the engine type grew and paddle steamers with engine of this type were built well into the 1860s with some reaching power over 1,600-hp.

== Examples ==
Examples of oscillating cylinder steam engines
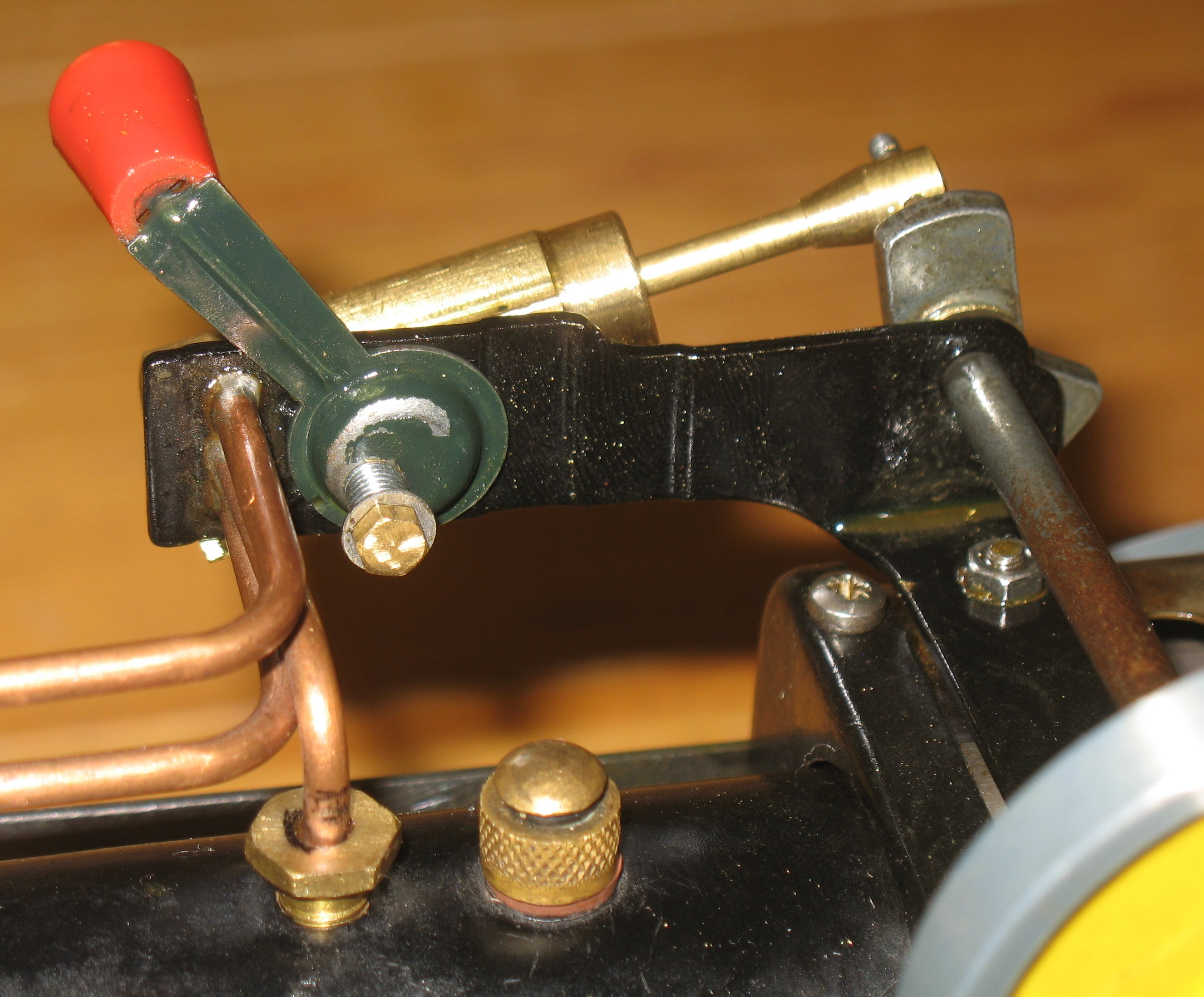
A reversible oscillating cylinder on a toy steam engine. The trunnion is shifted by an eccentric on the lever.

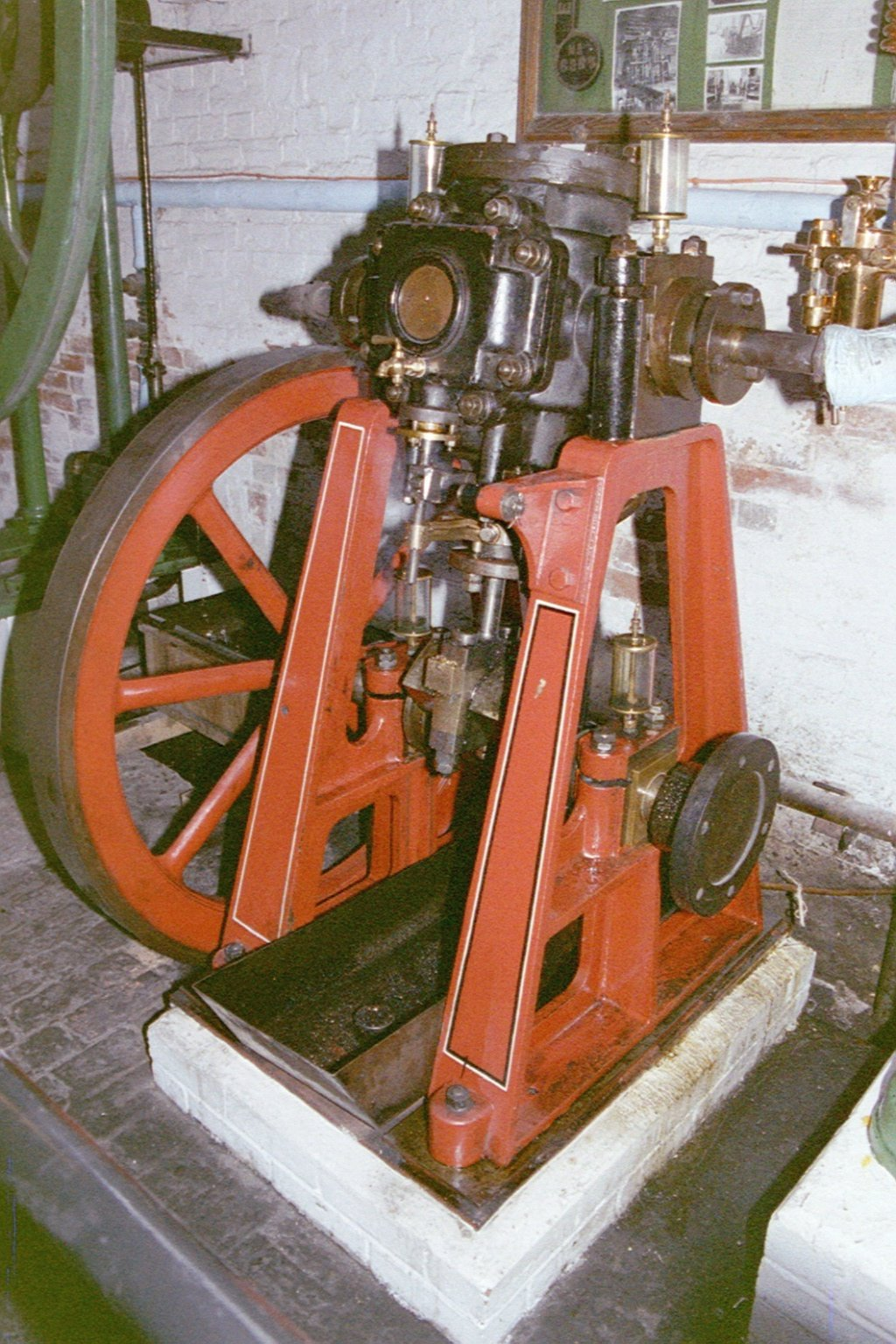
A typical small stationary oscillating cylinder engine

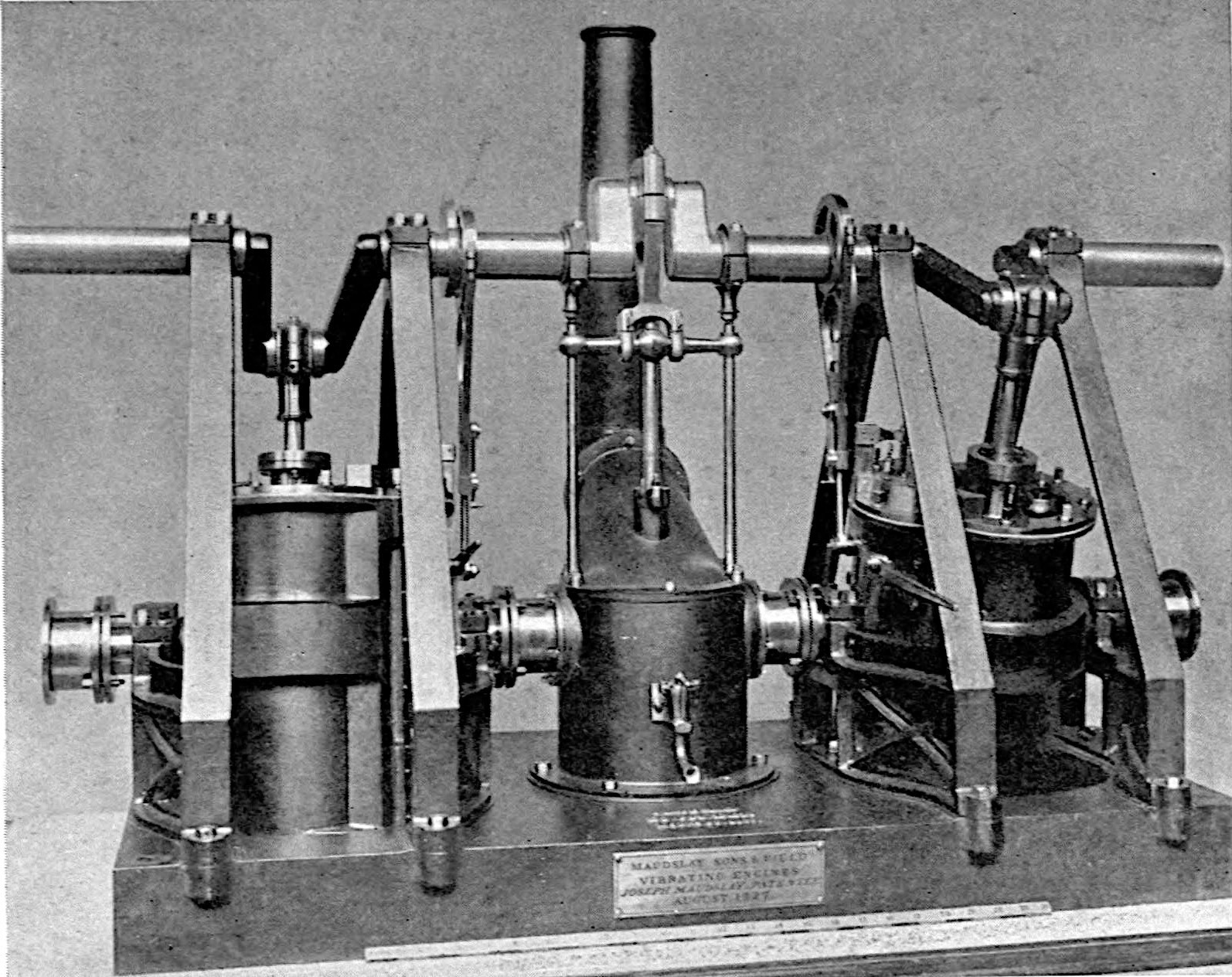
Model of a marine oscillating steam engine designed by Joseph Maudslay, clearly showing how the cylinders pivot on the trunnions, through which the steam is passed.

== See also ==
- Elbow engine - another cylinder-ported engine, not requiring additional valvegear
- Carpet railway – the 'Birmingham Dribbler' toy locomotives used this type of engine
