= Live Steam & Outdoor Railroading =

- September/October 2005 issue of Live Steam magazine
- Editor: David Brush
- Categories: Hobby magazines
- Frequency: Bi-monthly
- Publisher: Village Press, Inc.
- Founded: 1966
- Country: United States
- Based in: Traverse City, Michigan
- Language: English
- Website: Official Website

Live Steam & Outdoor Railroading magazine (formerly Live Steam Magazine) is a magazine published in the United States that was founded in 1966. The magazine is devoted to the live steam hobby as well as to other uses of miniature and full-size steam equipment.

== Origin ==
Live Steam was originally started as the Live Steam Newsletter in the early 1960s by Pershing Scott as a mimeographed newsletter. In August 1966, Scott gave the publishing rights of the newsletter to William Fitt. By 1967 the newsletter had expanded into magazine format with the name being changed to Live Steam Magazine.

== Present day ==
In 2005, the name was changed to Live Steam & Outdoor Railroading. It is currently published bi-monthly, in full color, with a press run of slightly over 10,000 as of December 2004.

== See also ==
- List of railroad-related periodicals
- Backyard railway
- Model engineering
- Rideable miniature railway
