= Showman's road locomotive =

Specialised traction engine for fairground use

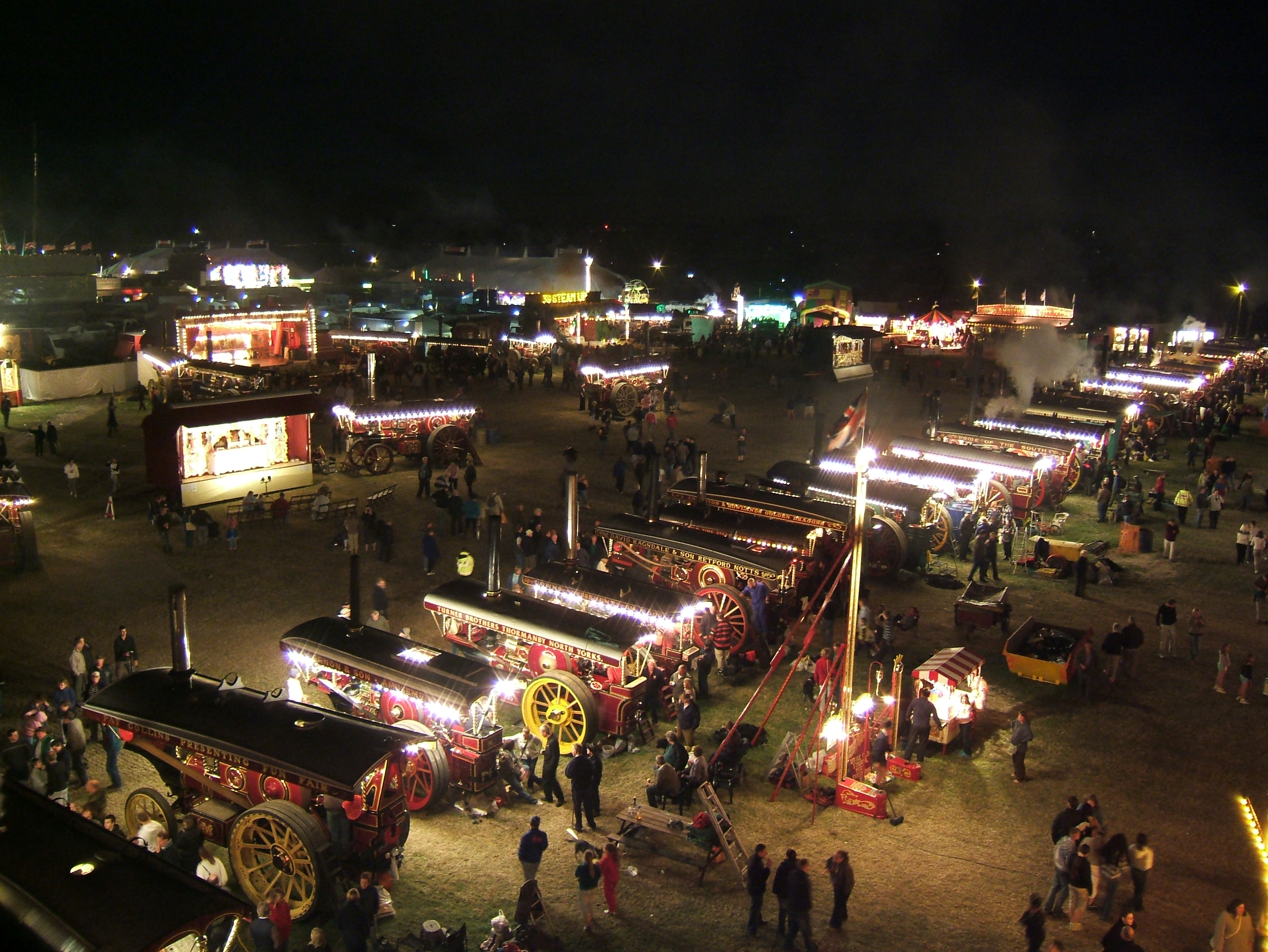
Night-time view of showman's engines, at the Great Dorset Steam Fair, 2007

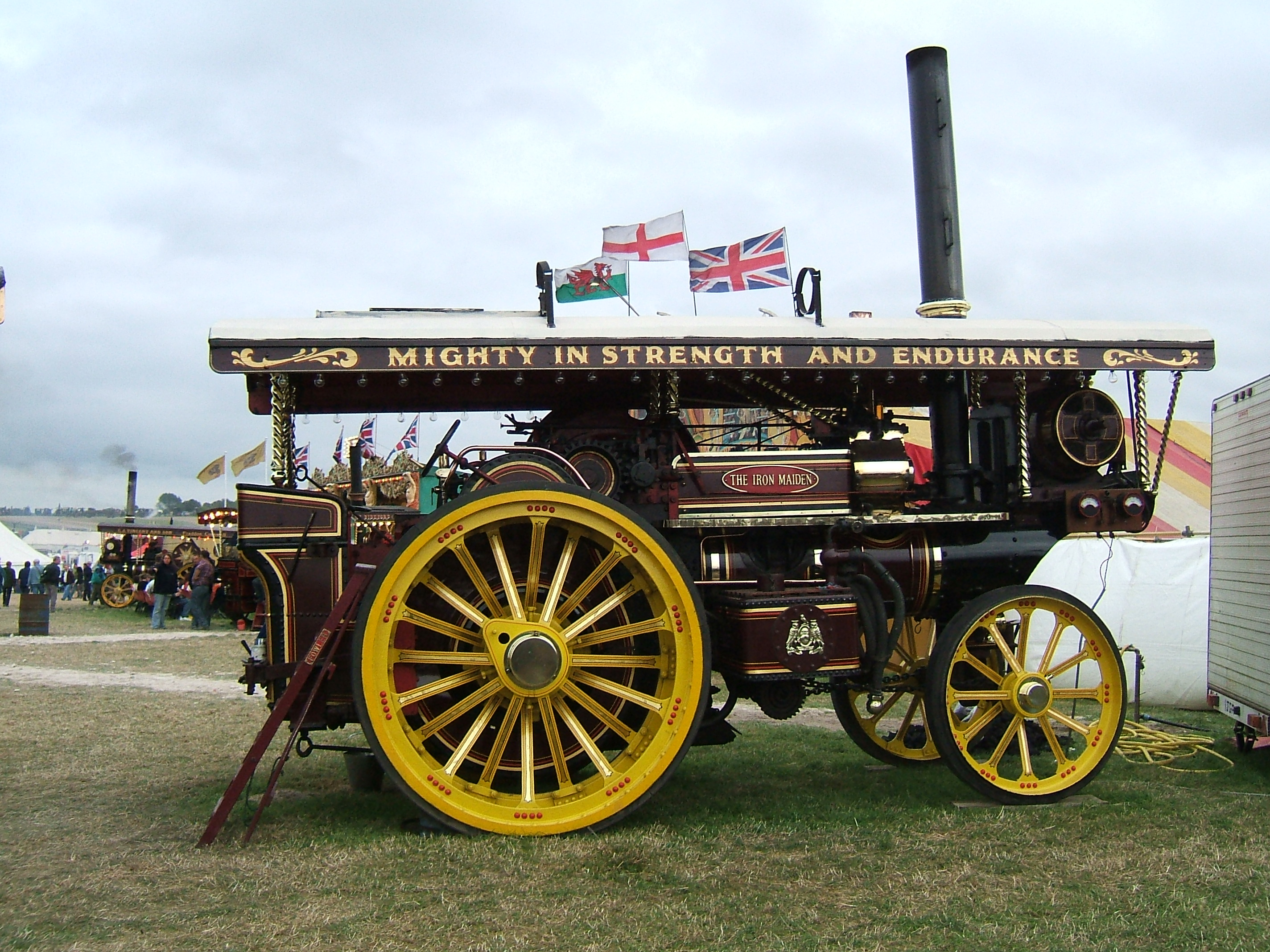
The Iron Maiden, a preserved showman's engine. Originally named Kitchener it now carries both names after appearing in the film The Iron Maiden.

A showman's road locomotive or showman's engine is a steam-powered road-going 'locomotive' designed to provide power and transport for a travelling funfair or circus. Similar to other road-going traction engines, showman's engines were normally distinguished by the addition of a full-length canopy, a dynamo mounted in front of the chimney, and brightly coloured paintwork with ornate decorations. The dynamo was used to generate electricity to illuminate and power various fairground rides. Although originally the ride's motion was powered by an internal steam engine, some later rides were driven direct from the showman's engine via a belt drive.

Showman's road locomotives were built in varying sizes, from relatively small 5, 6 and 7 NHP engines, right up to large 8 or 10 NHP engines. Probably the most popular design was the Burrell 8NHP single-crank compound design. The far greater distances involved meant they never caught on in the United States, where a combination of trains and horses was preferred.

== History ==
In 1859, a travelling circus owner, James Myers, hired a traction engine made by Bray's Traction Engine Company of Folkestone for a 3 month tour of the south of England. This is thought to be the first use of a road steam engine for this purpose, but did not find favour due to the cost and concerns about the effects of noise, smoke and steam on the circus animals.

Following the development of electric lighting in the late 19th century, "electric light engines" were developed for use on fairgrounds. These comprised portable steam engines attached to generators to provide power for lighting. However, these still needed to be moved between sites by horses. The firm of Charles Burrell & Sons removed this drawback by adding a dynamo, mounted on a bracket, to the front of a traction engine thus enabling equipment to be both transported and powered by the same engine.

One of the earliest engines ordered directly from the manufacturers by a showman was a Burrell No.1451 Monarch, built in 1889.

Production of showman's engines tailed off in the late-1920s, with the last Burrell 'Simplicity' being built by Garrett's of Leiston in 1930. The decline was due to the rise of diesel trucks initially helped by the availability of large numbers of former military vehicles at the end of World War 1. A 1927 act of parliament reduced road tax payments if the engine had rubber tyres which resulted in them becoming nearly universal.

The last showman's engine to be built was Fowler's 'Supreme', one of the 'Super Lions'; it was completed for Mrs A. Deakin (who also bought 'Simplicity') in March 1934. Fowler attempted to continue with a similar line of diesel engines, but it was not a success and only a single example was built. Showmen's engines saw the end of non-preservation use in the 1950s. 107 have survived into preservation.

== Characteristic features ==
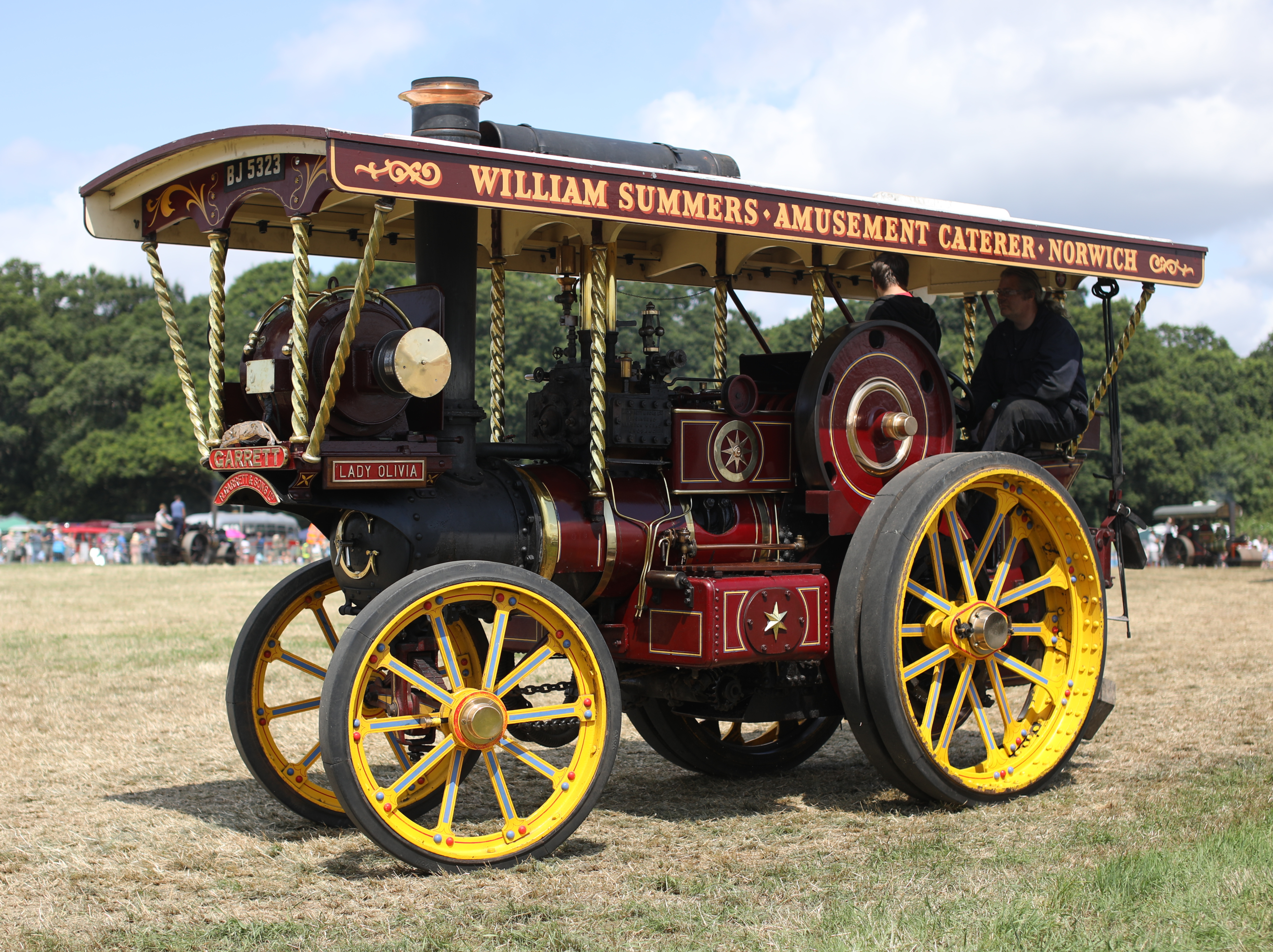
Richard Garrett & Sons Compound showman's tractor at Netley Marsh steam and craft show

In general, showman's road locomotives share much the same design and technology as other road-going traction engines; however, certain features set the showman's engine apart:

Ornate painting

Most were painted in bright colours; the Burrell standard was 'Lake Crimson' with 'Deep yellow' wheels. George Tuby's engines were distinctively painted Great Eastern blue with yellow wheels and lining. Other embellishments included elaborate scroll paintings, this was especially popular around the start of the 20th century. Typically the sideboards had the name of either the proprietor or of the ride the engines were working with picked out in gold.

Brass decoration

Most engines have simple steel rods for roof supports, but showman's engines employ a more flamboyant 'twisted' design usually of polished brass. Brass stars and other decoration were often mounted on the motion covers and water tanks.

Dynamo

This was driven by a belt from the engine's flywheel and powered the lighting on the rides and stalls, and often the rides themselves. The power varied with the NHP of the engine, typically a smaller 'five horse' (5NHP) engine would have a small 110 V Dynamo, with the larger scenic engines having a large 110 V DC (Direct Current) dynamo and smaller 80 V 'exciter'.

Full-length canopy

Most road locomotives have some kind of roof or canopy fitted, covering the man stand (where the driver operates the controls) and the crankshaft area. The canopy of a showman's engine extends forward of the chimney to protect the dynamo from rain ingress. They are often fitted with a string of lights along the perimeter to enhance the effect at night, this being more common in preservation than before.

Extension chimney

An extra tube is carried for extending the chimney when stationary. This tube could be between 6 and 8 feet (1.8 and 2.4 m) long, depending on the size of the engine. The chimney tube is carried on purpose-made brackets on the roof. The extra length of chimney improves the draft through the fire, and reduces the risk of smoke and smuts being blown around nearby fair-goers.

Crane

Many of the larger engines were built with, or at sometime had fitted, a large boom crane fitted to the tender. This was used for erecting the rides and moving items, such as gondola cars, from place to place.

Disk flywheel

Most road locomotives were fitted with disc flywheels, the idea of this being if they encountered horses en route, the horse would be less startled by the spinning disc. This theory was pretty much ruined when showmen began to decorate the flywheels, worsening the startling effect.

== Sub-types ==
=== Showman's tractors ===
Showman's tractors were basically miniaturized versions of their larger counterparts. Many were constructed following government legislation increasing weight limits at seven tons, so at between 5 and 7 tons, these engines were very popular. Again Burrell was a prolific manufacturer, as was William Foster, but the market leader was probably Garrett's of Leiston with a showman's engine based on their popular 4CD tractor design. Around 30 Aveling and Porter 5-ton tractors were used by showmen at some point in their lives. Brown & May steam tractors were also used.

=== 'Special Scenic' engines ===
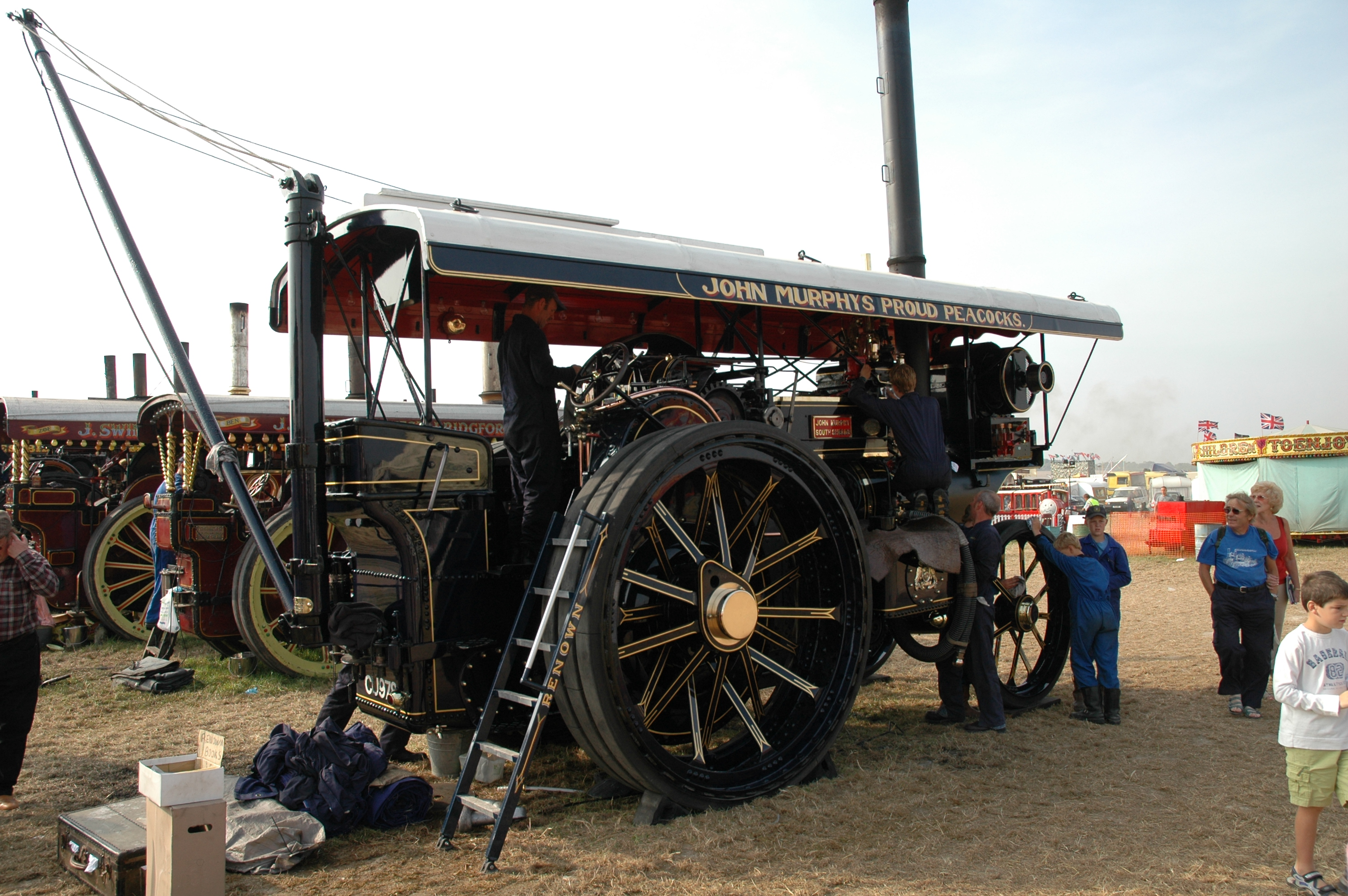
The Fowler no. 15653 Renown fitted with a crane at the back for loading the cars onto the ride

'Special Scenic' engines were perhaps the ultimate development of the showman's road locomotive. Built almost solely by Burrell of Thetford (Fowler built just one experimental engine), these were developed for the heavier rides that were emerging, in particular 'scenic railways'. These engines had a second dynamo, known as an exciter, located behind the chimney. This extra dynamo helped to start the heavy new scenic rides. In order to drive the belt for the extra dynamo the flywheel was made wider. The first engine to be built new as a 'Special Scenic' was Burrell No. 3827 Victory. Supplied to Charles Thurston of Norwich in 1920, this engine is now preserved in the Thursford Collection in Norfolk.

=== Showman's steam wagons ===
Although less common than the tractors or larger locomotives, showmen sometimes converted the conventional steam wagons for showland use. Foden's were probably the most popular choice, Burrell's only ever sold one wagon specifically built for a showman: no. 3883 Electra was built in 1921 for Charles Summers of Norwich, it was later sold to an operator in Plymouth, but was later destroyed in World War II by the Nazi Blitz of the city.

=== Conversions ===
As well as genuine factory-built engines, a great number of engines were converted from conventional road locomotives to full showman's engines by both the showmen, and by private concerns, like Openshaw's. Most of the converted engines were ex-War Dept Fowlers and McLarens. Others were powerful 'contractor's' type road locomotives, many of these were a cheap and powerful alternative to factory models, and they were plentiful following World War I. This extended beyond British manufactures with one showman using a Kemna engine in the 1920s.

As well as full conversions, showmen were also experts in adding extra dynamos, or fitting their own designs of crane and canopies. This led to a world of variation in the engines. Some 'home-made' designs were better than others, but many have survived.

Due to the demand and prestige attached to showman's engines, in recent years a number of engines, mainly road rollers, have been converted by preservationists. This practice is causing concern amongst some enthusiasts, as in some cases unique examples of some models have been lost. In a few cases owners have converted engines back during restoration to their original form. Rollers would have made for extremely poor showman's engines so such conversions were not done during commercial operation.

== Manufacturers ==
The most prolific manufacturers of these vehicles was Charles Burrell of Thetford Norfolk with around 200 built. Their later 8nhp engines were held in very high regard by their operators. Other major manufacturers included John Fowler & Co. of Leeds with 50 and William Foster & Co. of Lincoln with around 71 produced. Other manufacturers made lesser ventures into the showman's engine market; these included Wallis and Steevens of Basingstoke, Foden's of Sandbach and Brown & May of Devizes. Aveling and Porter produced a single showman's engine in 1904 but no orders resulted although a number of their road locomotives were converted to showman's engines.

=== Fowler B6 "Super Lion" ===
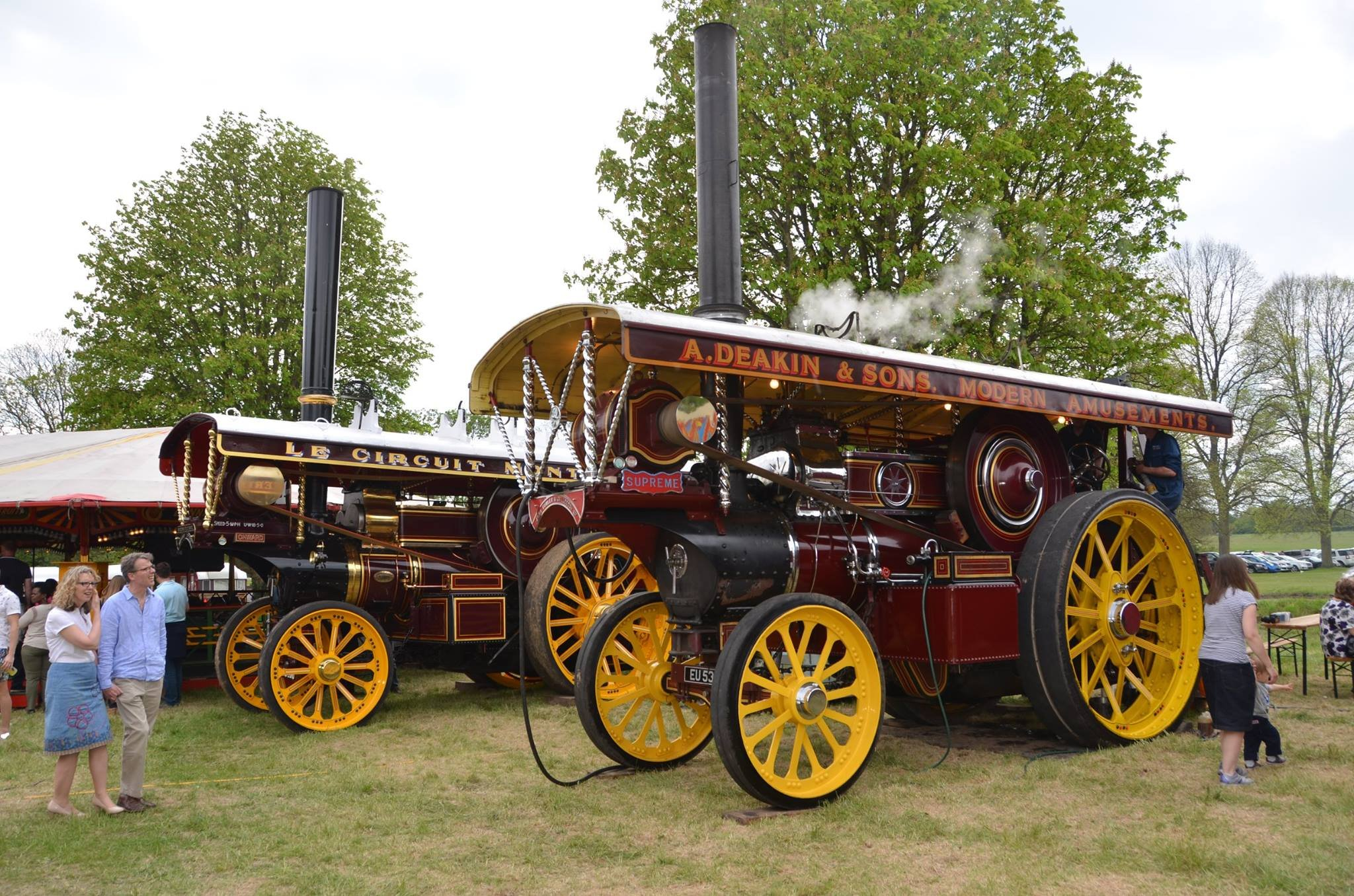
Fowler Supreme and alongside it the recreated Onward at Carter's Steam Fair in May 2016

In the early 1930s, when steam on the roads was in decline, Fowler's, under advice from Sidney Harrison of Burrell's, produced four of the most sophisticated showman's road locomotives ever constructed. Incorporating many features of the popular Burrell design, they were steam's finale. The first was No. 19782 The Lion, built in March 1932 for Anderton and Rowland of Bristol. In April of the same year No. 19783 King Carnival II was supplied to Frank Mcconville of West Hartlepool. The third engine, No. 19989 Onward, was built for Samuel Ingham of Cheshire. The last of the four, and indeed the last showman's engine ever constructed, was No. 20223 Supreme, built in March 1934 for Mrs A. Deakin. Three of these engines survived into preservation, with Supreme and King Carnival II on road haulage duties for their last days in commercial use. Onward was the unlucky engine, being cut up in 1946; however a faithful replica of Onward was completed in 2016.

== Famous showmen owners ==
Although hundreds of showland families operated showman's engines a few are worthy of note.

Pat Collins and family operated well over 25 showman's engines, although predominantly Burrell's he also owned various Fowler's and other makes.

Charles Thurston and family operated a large number of engines from both Burrell's and Foster's. A number of their engines have been preserved. Foster's Admiral Beatty and Burrell's Britannia were owned by William Thurston. A unique set of four of Charles Thurston's engines have been preserved at the Thursford Collection in Norfolk. These are all Burrell's: King Edward VII of 1905, Victory of 1920, Unity and Alexandra.

George Thomas Tuby operated a fleet of seven Burrell showman's engines, most of which carried names according to the position of Tuby in the local government. These included Councillor, Alderman, Mayor and surviving Ex-Mayor

== Preservation ==
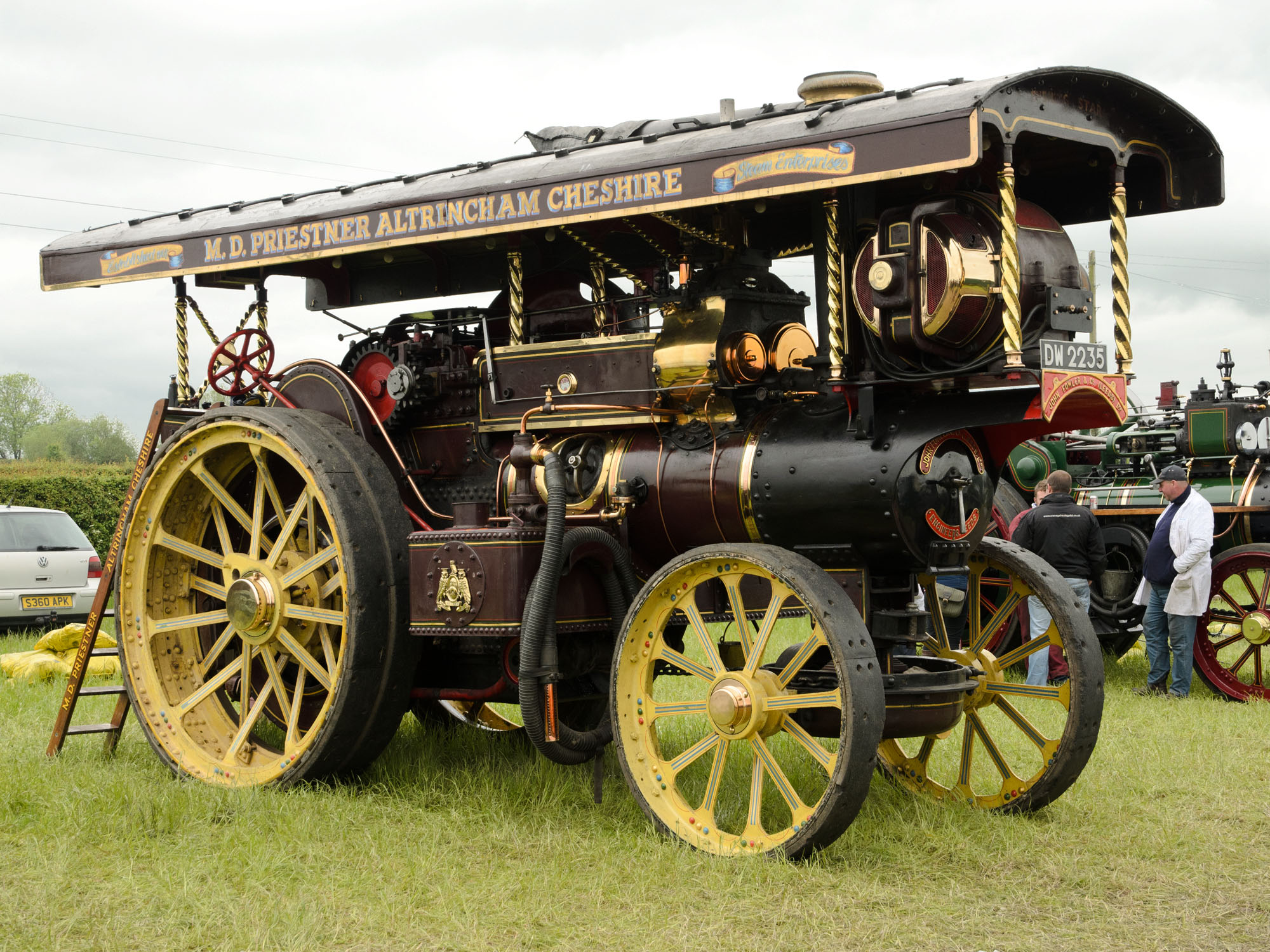
Fowler Showman's Road Locomotive "Evening Star" (1917)

The last showman's engine in commercial showland use was in 1958. Before this, engines were being sold for scrap for very low prices. George Cushing, founder of the Thursford Collection, bought Victory, Alexandra, and Unity for around £40 each. (For comparison, a similar engine No. 3865 No. 1 was sold at auction in 2003 for £320,000.) Towards the end of the 1930s, engines were simply becoming outdated. With the ending of the Second World War, hundreds of cheap and powerful ex-army lorries replaced the showman's engines, making them obsolete. Although many of these engines were scrapped, a good number of them have survived into preservation. Many appear at rallies all over the UK, while others are in museums such as Thursford or the Hollycombe Collections.

== See also ==
- Carousel
- Steam fair
