= Live steam =

Steam-powered models and toys

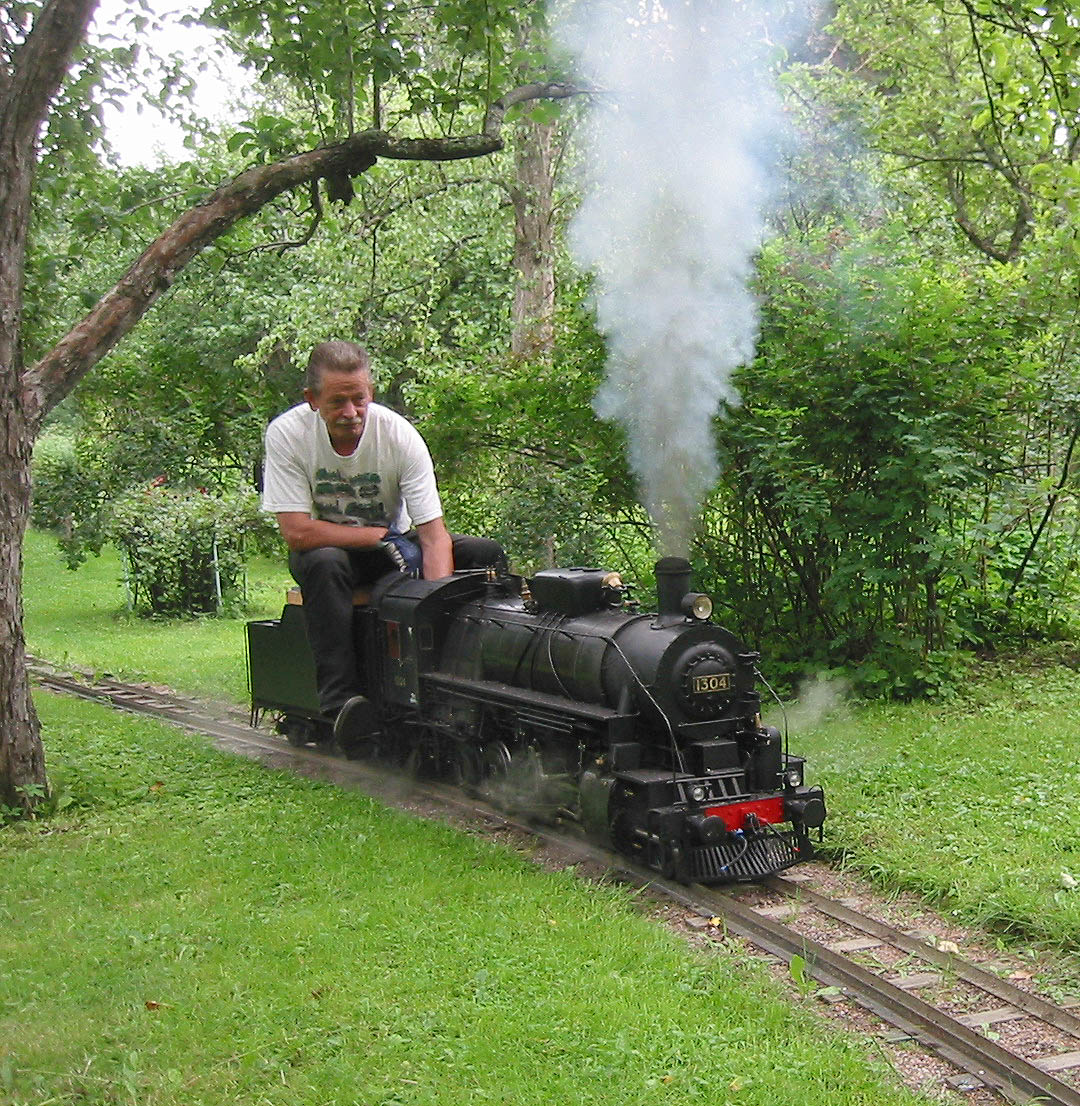
A hand-crafted, coal-fired, 1:8 scale 2-10-0 'live steam' locomotive in 7 1/4 in (184 mm) gauge

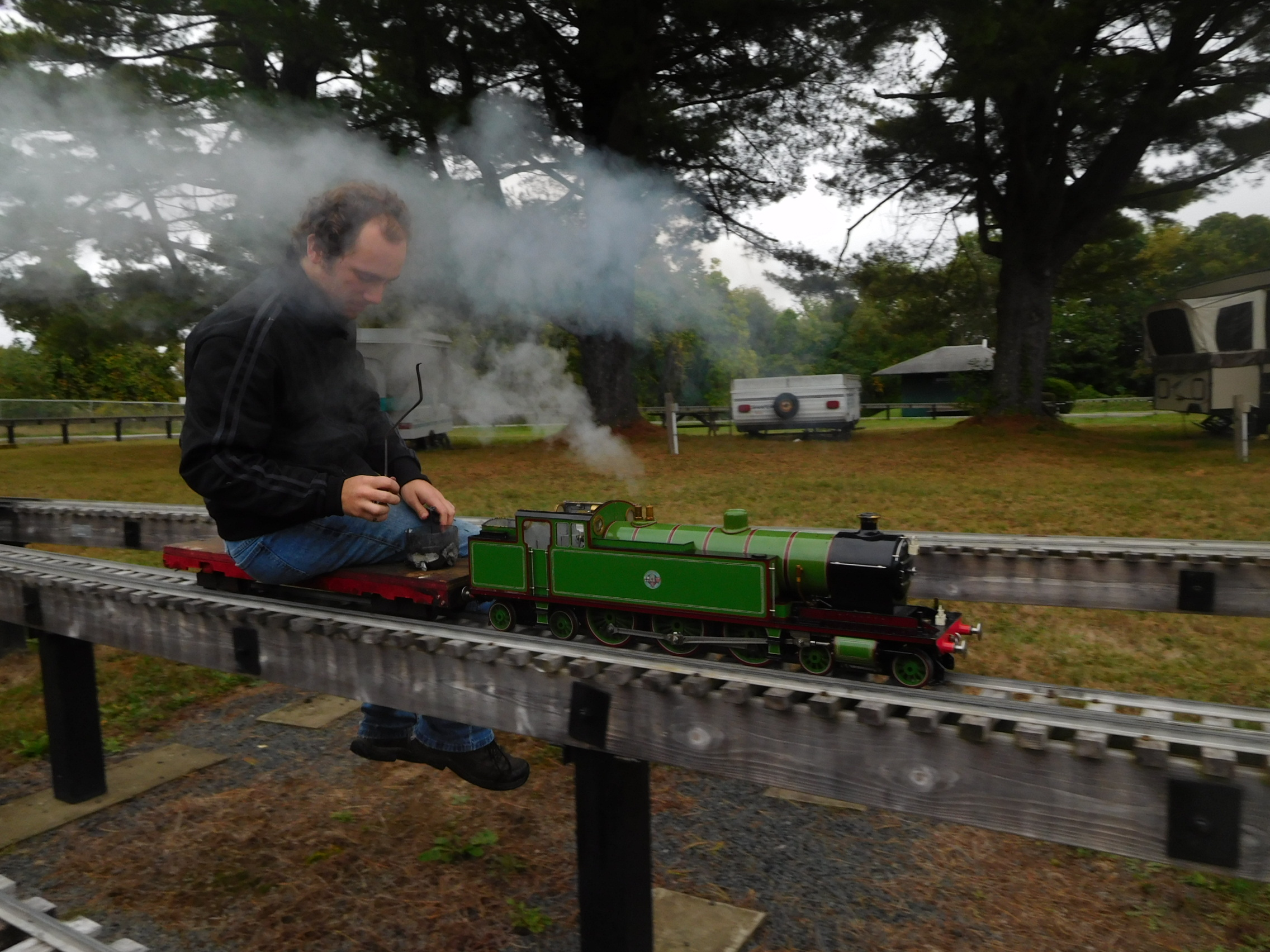
A "high line" representation of a Whitelegg-designed Baltic Tank in LT&S Livery. This engine runs on a track gauge of 3.5 inches and is powerful enough to pull several people. High lines are a configuration of a continuously elevated track and riders sit side-saddle or with legs straddling the track depending on lineside clearances.

Live steam is steam under pressure, obtained by heating water in a boiler. The steam may be used to operate stationary or moving equipment.

A live steam machine or device is one powered by steam, but the term is usually reserved for those that are replicas, scale models, toys, or otherwise used for heritage, museum, entertainment, or recreational purposes, to distinguish them from similar devices powered by electricity, internal combustion, or some other more convenient method but designed to look as if they are steam-powered. Revenue-earning steam-powered machines such as mainline and narrow gauge steam locomotives, full-sized steamships, and the worldwide electric power-generating industry steam turbines are not normally referred to as "live steam".

Steamrollers and traction engines are popular, in 1:4 or 1:3 scale, as are model stationary steam engines, ranging from pocket-size to 1:2 scale.

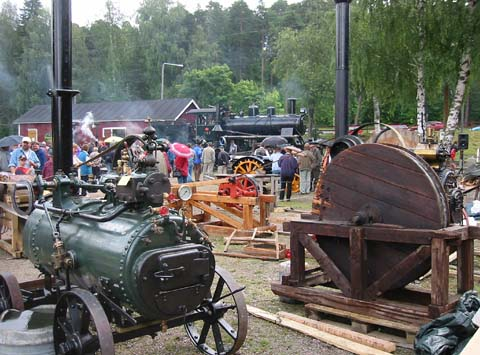
A live steam festival with equipment on display ranging from small stationary engines to full-size locomotives. Porvoo, Finland, 2003

== Railroads or railways ==
Ridable, large-scale live steam railroading on a backyard railroad is a popular aspect of the live steam hobby, but it is time-consuming to build a locomotive from scratch and it can be costly to purchase one already built. Garden railways, in smaller scales (that cannot pull a "live" person nor be ridden on), offer the benefits of real steam engines (and at lower cost and in less space), but do not provide the same experience as operating one's own locomotive in the larger scales and riding on (or behind) it, while doing so.

One of the most famous live steam railroads was Walt Disney's Carolwood Pacific Railroad around his California home; it later inspired Walt Disney to surround his planned Disneyland amusement park with a working, narrow gauge railroad.

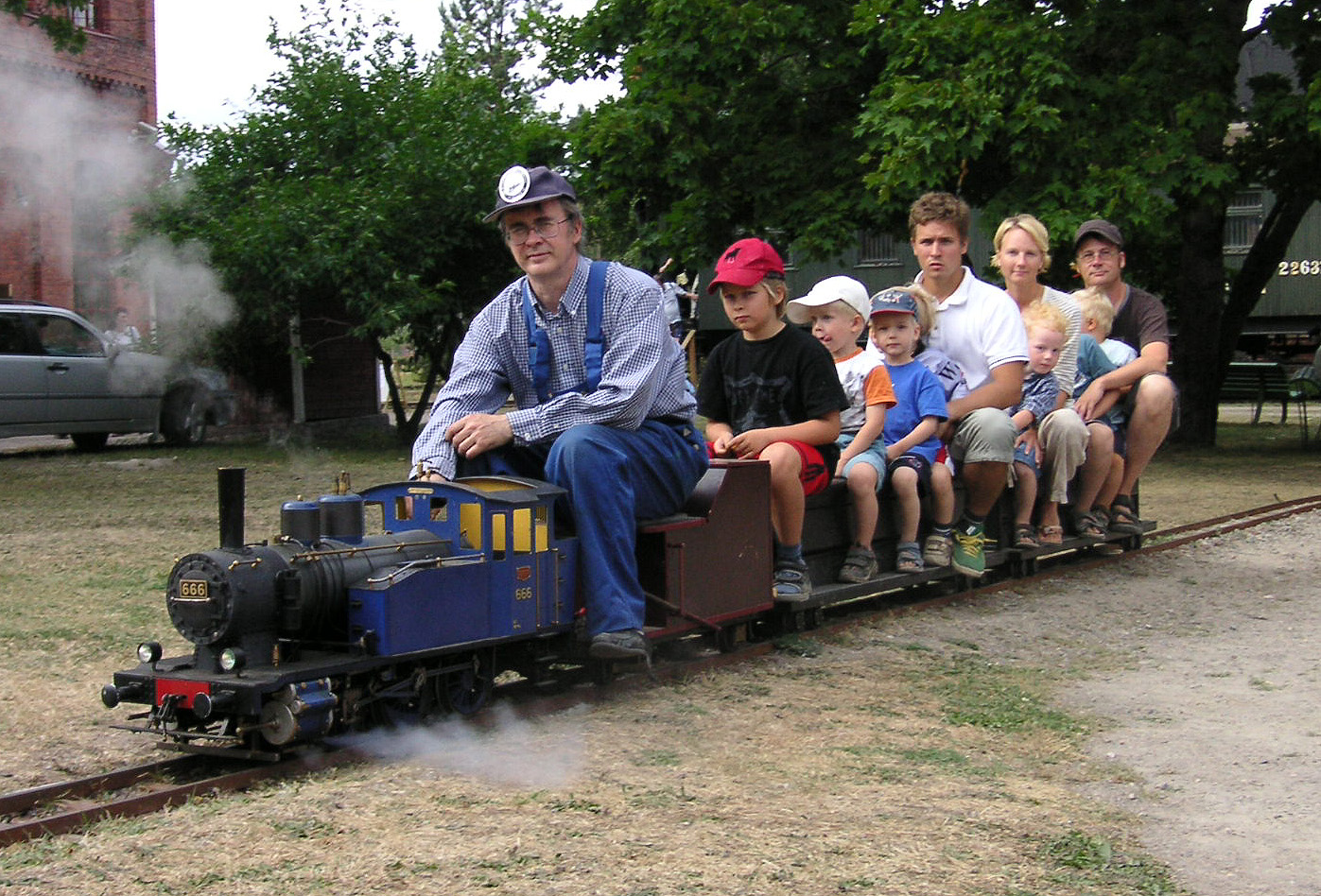
A propane-fired 1:8 scale live-steam train running on the Finnish Railway Museum's miniature 7 1/4 in (184 mm) track

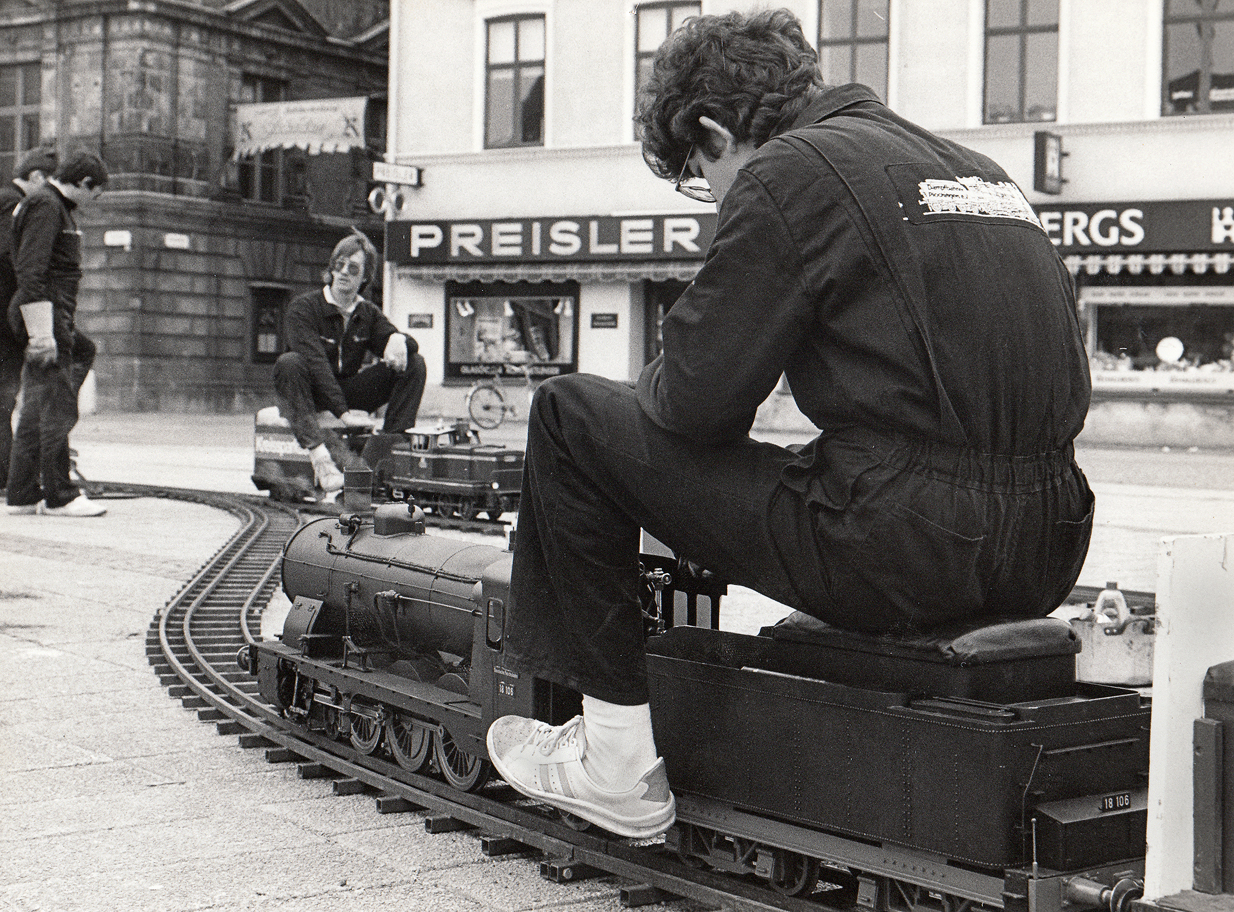
A live-steam 1:8 train at Malmö, 1987

The live steam hobby is especially popular in the UK, US, New Zealand, Australia, and Japan. All over the world, there are hundreds of clubs and associations as well as many thousands of private backyard railroads. The world's largest live steam layout, with over 25 miles (40 km) of 7 1/2 in (190.5 mm) trackage is Train Mountain Railroad in Chiloquin, Oregon. Other notable layouts are operated by the Los Angeles Live Steamers Railroad Museum and the Riverside Live Steamers.

=== Scale ===
A live steam locomotive is often an exact, hand-crafted scale model. Live steam railroad scales are generally referred to by the number of inches of scale per foot. For example, a 1:8 scale locomotive will often be referred to as a 1½" scale locomotive. Common modelling scales are Gauge 1 (1:32 scale), 1/2" (1:24 scale), 3/4" (1:16), 1" (1:12), 1½" (1:8), 2½" (~1:5) and 3" (1:4).

=== Track gauge ===
Track gauge refers to the distance between the rails. The ridable track gauges range from 2 1/2 in (64 mm) to 15 in (381 mm), the most popular being 3 1/2 in (89 mm), 4 3/4 in (121 mm), 5 in (127 mm), 7 1/4 in (184 mm) and 7 1/2 in (190.5 mm) (see Rail transport modelling scales). Some live steam club layouts use dual or even triple gauge tracks. Gauges from 10 in (254 mm) and up are called "Miniature Railways" (in the US these are known as "Grand Scale Railroads"), and are used mostly in amusement park rides and commercial settings.

Often the gauge has little to do with the scale of a locomotive since larger equipment can be built in a narrow gauge railway configuration. For instance, scales of 1.5, 1.6, 2.5, and 3 inches per foot (corresponding to scales of 1:8 to 1:4) have been used on a 7 1/2 in (190.5 mm) track gauge.

The generally accepted smallest gauge for a live steam locomotive is O scale. Producing smaller-scale models remains problematic, as the laws of physics do not scale: creating a small-scale boiler that produces useful quantities of steam requires careful engineering. Hornby Railways has produced commercial live steam-powered locomotives in OO scale by utilising an electrically heated boiler mounted in the tender, with cylinders in the locomotive, and control provided by electrical signals fed through the track from a remote control unit. They are less mechanically realistic than models in larger scales; the visible valve gear is a dummy, as on the electric-motor-powered models, and steam admission to the cylinders is controlled by a rotary-valve servo inside the boiler casing, which is also a dummy. Nevertheless, the locomotive is driven by steam that is created on board the locomotive and is hence a genuine steam locomotive.

It is technically possible to build even smaller operating steam engines. Hand-made examples, as small as Z scale (1:220), with a gauge of only 6.5 mm (0.256 in), have been produced. These are fired with a butane flame from a burner in the engine's tender. AA Sherwood of Australia, an engineering lecturer, produced some miniature scale model live steam engines in the late 1960s and early 1970s. His smallest live steam engines were 1:240 scale which is smaller than the 1:220 of Z Scale. The smallest scale Sherwood worked in was 1:480, though that was not live steam.

=== Technology ===
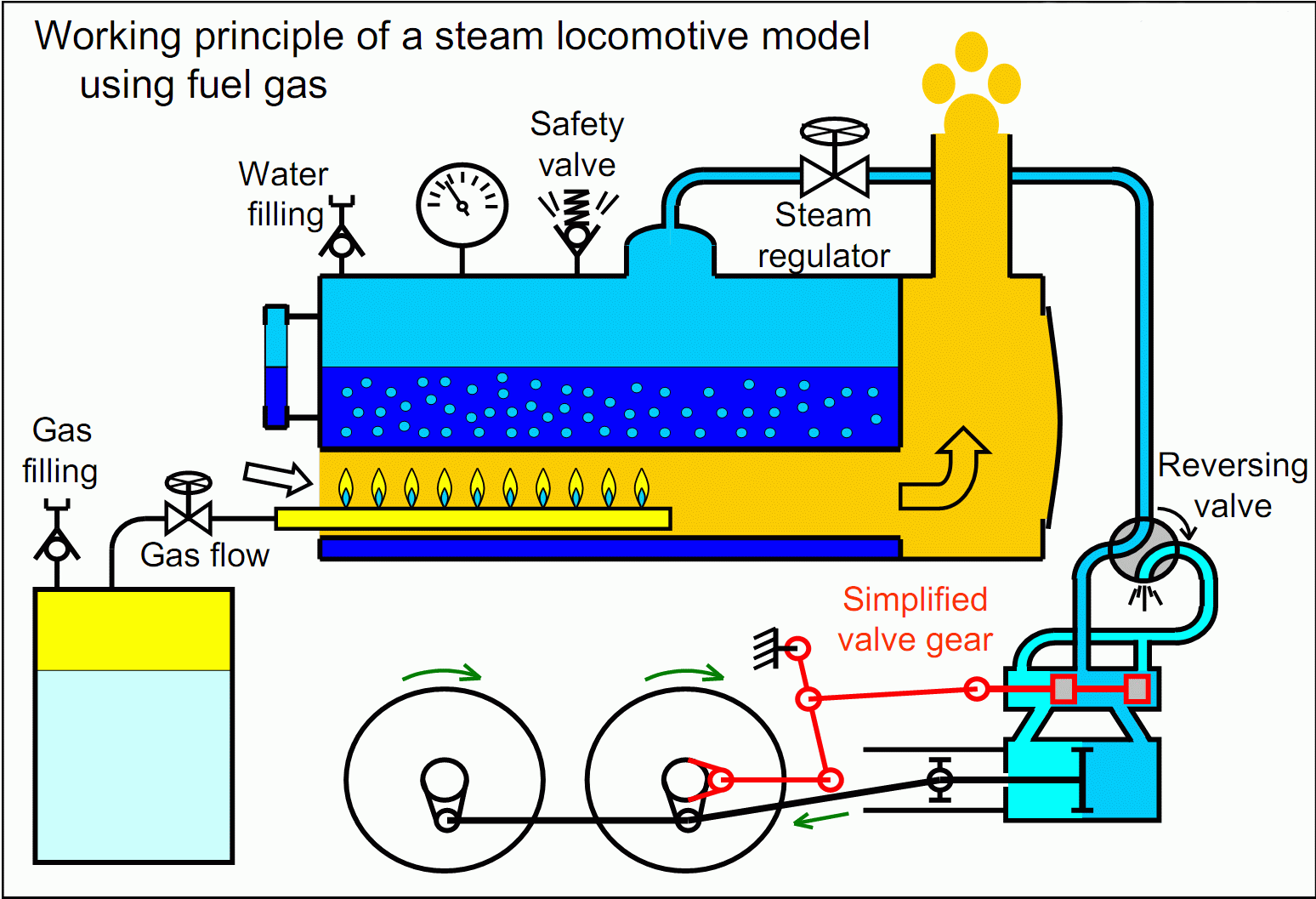

A wide variety of boiler designs are available, ranging from simple externally fired pot boilers to sophisticated multi-flue internally fired boilers and even superheater boilers usually found only on larger, more complex models.

For basic locomotive models, a simple valve gear can be used, with the reversing (if any) performed by a valve, or by using a "slip" eccentric.

More complex locomotive models can use valve gear similar to real steam machine with the reversing done mechanically, most frequently the Walschaerts type.

=== Fuels ===
There are several common fuels used to boil water in live steam models:

- Hexamine fuel tablets – which produce relatively little heat but are cheap and relatively safe. They are often used on "toy" live steam locomotives and engines, such as the newer models in the range produced by Mamod.
- Methylated spirit, (methanol/ethanol mixture) – which burns hotter than solid fuel, but, as with any flammable liquid, requires more careful handling. Cheap and easy to obtain, this fuel was used with early Mamod models.
- Butane gas – clean burning and safe, but relatively expensive to engineer the burners.
- Electricity – delivered via the track and used to boil the water with an immersion heater. In 2003, Hornby launched a range of 00 gauge models that run from a 10 to 17 Volt power supply, making this method safer than previous, higher voltage versions.
- Coal – which is the prototypical fuel for most full-sized steam locomotives, and the preferred fuel for ridable trains. It can also be used in boilers down to at least 16mm:1 foot scale.
- Oil – also a popular fuel for large, ridable trains.
- Propane gas – an alternative to coal or oil in large-scale models. Propane has also been used successfully as fuel in smaller 1:48 scale live steam locomotives produced most notably by Roland Neff.

== Road vehicles ==
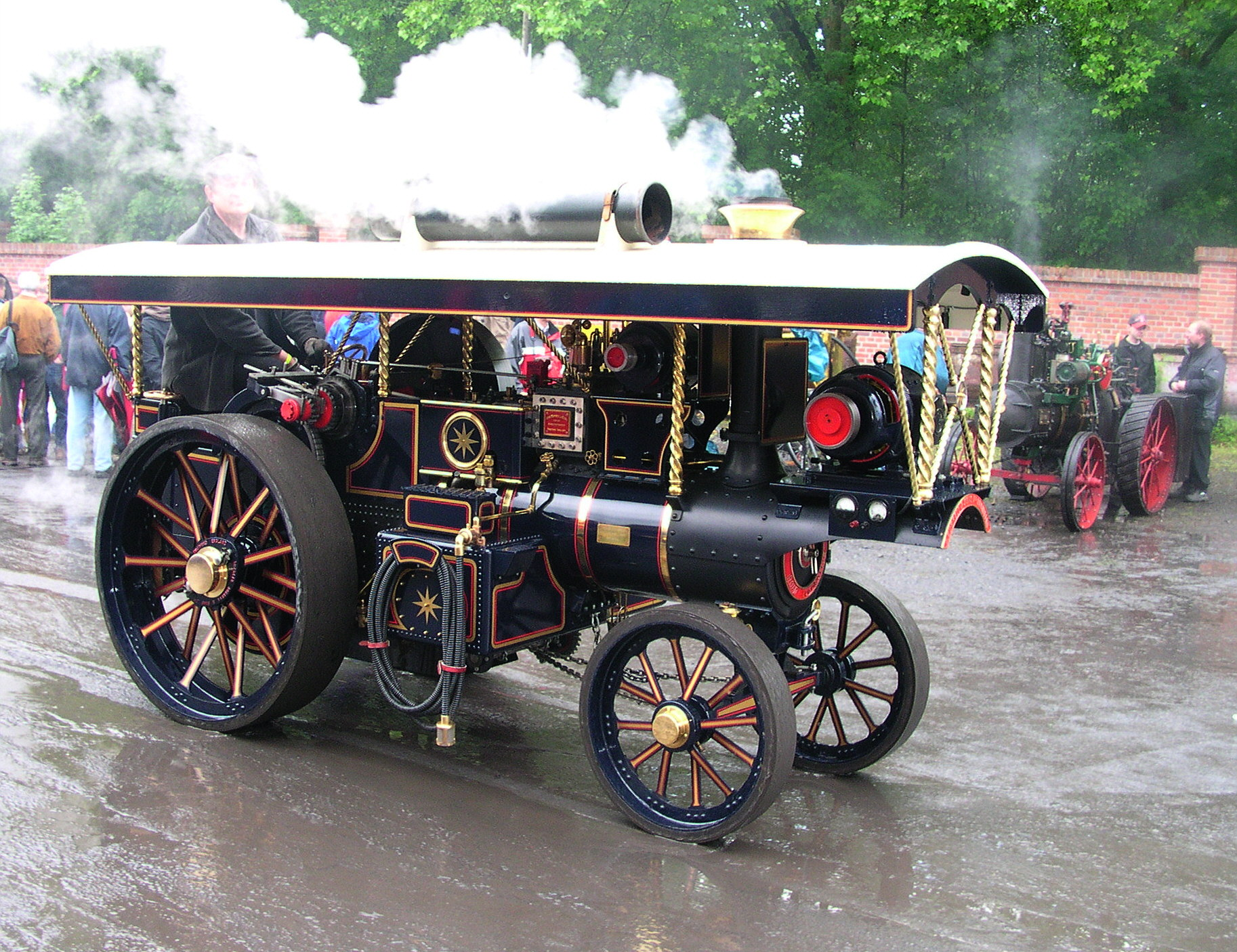
Model of a 1:2 scale Burrell steam road vehicle

Live steam road vehicles are popular with model engineers because they are not restricted to running on tracks or water and can be easily transported to rallies and exhibitions. They include traction engines & steam rollers, showman's engines, wagons, cars, road-making & agricultural machines, often seen with ancillary equipment like threshing machines.

== Boats and ships ==
Most types of boats and ships that were powered by steam in real life can be found as live steam ship models. These include, amongst others, speed boats, launches, tugboats, ocean liners, warships, paddle steamers and freight carriers. A specialized type is the tethered hydroplane. When steam-powered, these often have flash boilers.

== Stationary engines ==
Stationary engines tend to be less popular with modelers than mobile engines; probably because they are less easily transportable. They are more popular with toy makers. They can be anything from small farm engines to winding engines and mill engines.

== Toys ==
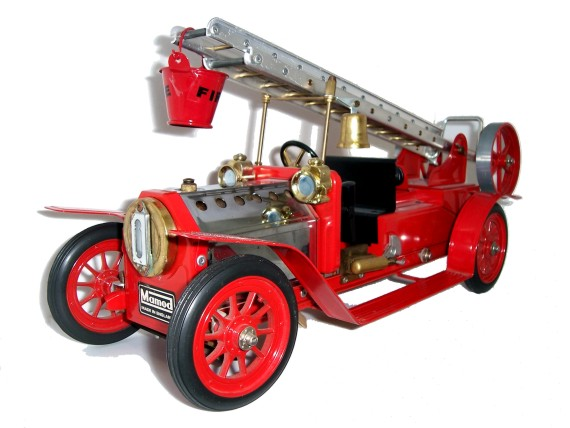
Mamod fire engine

In the late 19th and early-mid 20th centuries, live steam toys were extremely popular, with some large manufacturers like Bing selling hundreds of different models in large quantities. There were very many smaller manufacturers all over the world. Some of these, like Mamod, Wilesco and Jensen, are still in business making live steam toys, although they are now mainly marketed as collectables and novelties rather than toys. Toys tend to be less accurate representations of real life equipment than are models and many are somewhat generic in nature. The range includes all those seen as models and some of a purely novelty kind.

== Festivals ==
A live steam festival (often called a "Steam Fair" in the UK and a live steam "meet" in the US) is a gathering of people interested in steam engine technology. Locomotives, trains, traction engines, steam wagons, steam rollers, showman's engines and tractors, steam boats and cars, and stationary steam engines may be on display, both full-sized and in miniature. Rides may also be offered.

== Publications ==
There are several magazines devoted to the live steam hobby:

"Model Engineer" is an English publication that is published twice a month and was founded in 1898. Most locomotive articles have an "English" flavour popular in the UK, Australia, New Zealand and South Africa. The magazine is aimed at constructors but also covers non-steam and non-rail model engineering interests.

"Live Steam & Outdoor Railroading" is a U.S. magazine, founded in 1966 and devoted to the live steam hobby, as well as to other uses of miniature and full-size steam. Originally, it was a mimeographed newsletter, but soon expanded into magazine format. In 2005, the name was changed from "Live Steam". It is currently published bi-monthly, with a press run of slightly over 10,000 (Dec. 2004).

Now defunct, "The Home Railway Journal", launched in 2006, was specifically aimed at enthusiasts with ride-on railways (although not just steam-powered) in North America. It was published quarterly in Sacramento, California, US.

== See also ==
- Carpet railway – the 'Birmingham Dribbler' locomotives were a very early form of live steam toy
- List of steam fairs
- Live Steam & Outdoor Railroading (magazine)
- Model engineering
- Model steam engine
- Railway modelling
- Rail transport modelling scales
- Saturated steam
- Superheated steam
- Ridable miniature railway
- Backyard railroad
