= Myford =

British machine tool manufacturer

Myford Ltd
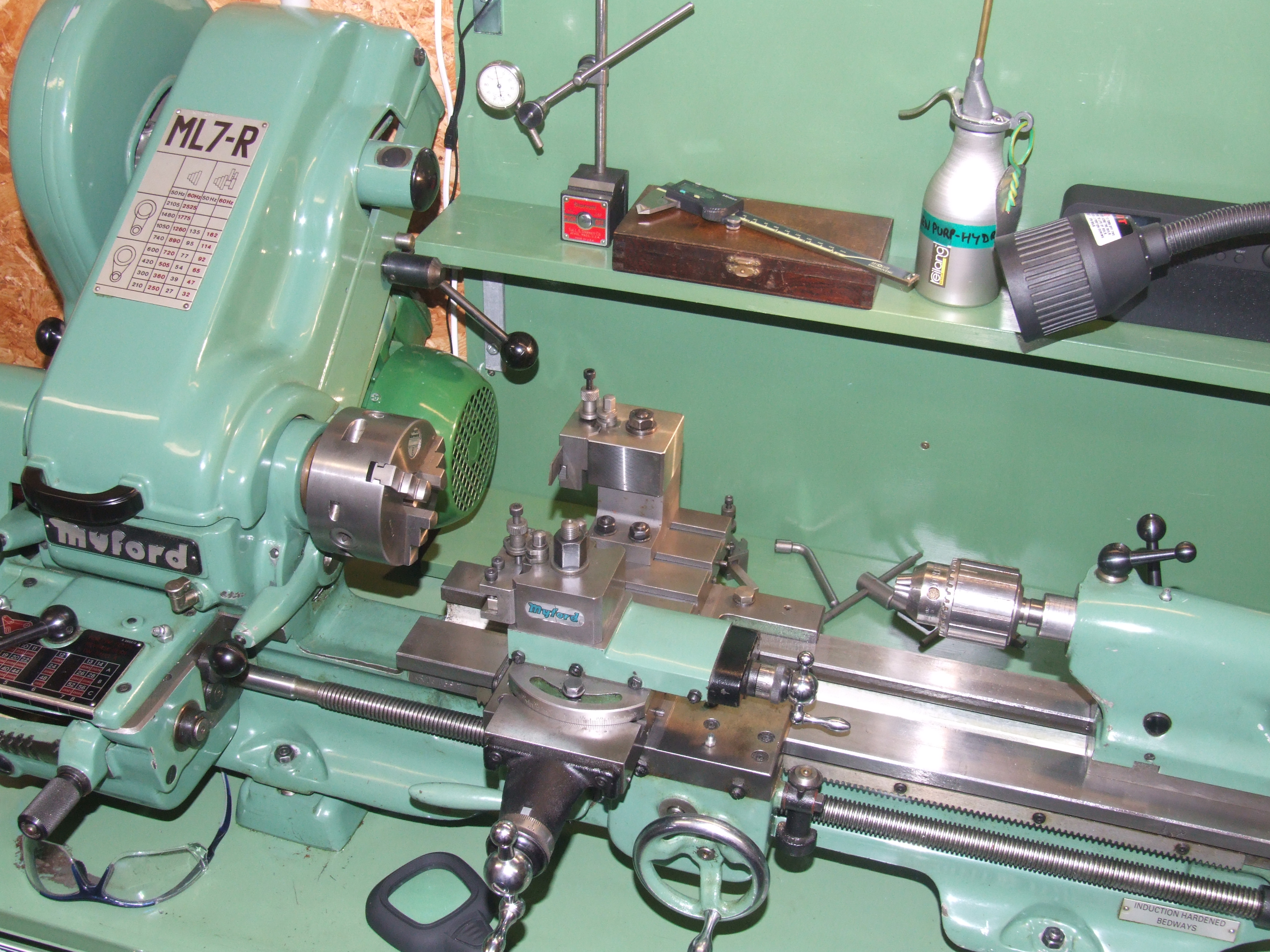
- Type: Tool manufacturer
- Genre: Tool and die maker
- Predecessor: Myford (Holdings) Ltd
- Founded: 2011 in Leeds, West Yorkshire
- Founder: Jonathan Oxley
- Headquarters: Mytholmroyd, West Yorkshire, United Kingdom
- Products: Metal lathes
- Number of employees: <20
- Website: www.myford.co.uk

Myford Limited is a British machine tool manufacturer originally based at 10-12 East Parade, Leeds, West Yorkshire in the United Kingdom under its former name of L & P 240 Limited. The company is notable for its continuation of production of Myford metalworking lathes since the original company (Myford (Holdings) Ltd was wound up.

== Original company ==
The company's original name was the Myford Engineering Company, having been founded by Cecil Moore in 1934.

Very few changes took place to the core product after 1953 when the Super 7 lathe was introduced, itself an improvement of the ML 7. This model of lathe is still widely used within the field of model engineering.

Other products made by the company include ML8 wood turning lathe, 4" planer, MG12H cylindrical grinder, 254 engineers lathe and the Speed 10 lathe. Most of these are no longer in production.

As of 2010 the business was still owned by the family, and run by Moore's grandson Christopher Moore. During mid-July 2011 Myford announced a "liquidation sale" stating that it would be last opportunity to buy "spares, lathes and plant equipment" from Myford themselves at the Beeston site.

== New company ==
Myford Ltd was founded by solicitor Jonathan Oxley with an original name of L & P 240 Limited. The name was changed to Myford Ltd on 26 August 2011 and continues to run from its base in West Yorkshire, where lathes are still built and refurbished.

Oxley left the company on 1 August 2011, leaving the company in the hands of the Dickinson brothers, Richard and Christian, and their mother Christine. Richard also has a machine tool supplying business, RDG Tools, based at the same premises which he started in 1992.

== Beeston ==
The late Ian Mills, Notts County F.C.'s, former, statistician, worked as an electrician at Myford until 2011.

In 2013 property developers M & R E submitted outline planning condition for transforming the old Myford site at Wilmot Lane in Beeston into housing.
