= Backyard railroad =

Large scale model railway, typically installed outdoors

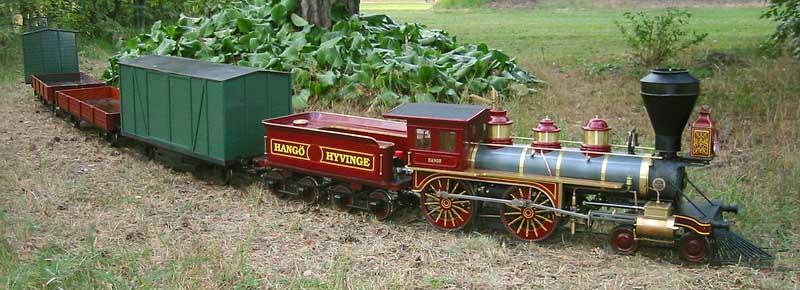
A backyard railroad, with a 4-4-0 locomotive in 1:8 scale, on a portable track in Finland

A backyard railroad is a privately owned, outdoor railroad, most often in miniature, but large enough for one or several persons to ride on. The rail gauge can be anything from 2 1/2 in (64 mm) to 7 1/2 in (190.5 mm) or more. Smaller backyard or outdoor railroads that cannot be ridden are called garden railroads. Some backyard railroads use full-size rolling stock, such as the former 3 ft (914 mm) narrow gauge Grizzly Flats Railroad owned by railfan and Disney animator Ward Kimball.

Hundreds, even thousands of backyard railroads exist, especially in the United States and the United Kingdom. Walt Disney's 7 1/4 in (184 mm) gauge ridable miniature Carolwood Pacific Railroad, located at his home in the Los Angeles neighborhood of Holmby Hills, was a notable example. It inspired Disney to surround his planned Disneyland amusement park with the 3 ft (914 mm) narrow gauge Disneyland Railroad.

== Track ==
Tracks for the layout can be either portable (i.e. removable), or permanent. The former may be of fairly simple welded steel construction, but the latter are usually built from miniature steel or aluminium rails attached to wooden, plastic or even concrete sleepers (US: ties), and put on a proper foundation of crushed stone ("track ballast"), just as in full size. Turnouts (US: switches) are also fabricated from these basic materials. Usually, prototypical appearance is sought for, but some portable tracks may not closely resemble real railroad tracks. In many cases dual-gauge track (i.e. 3 1/2 in (89 mm) and 5 in (127 mm) gauge) may be used to allow locomotives and rolling stock of different gauges to run.

== Locomotives and rolling stock ==
Locomotives on a backyard railroad can be of different types; steam locomotives, gasoline or diesel engines, or even electrically operated, using rechargeable lead-acid batteries inside the locomotive. Miniature steam locomotives are an element of a related hobby known as live steam. One of the more well-known builders of backyard railroad trains was Bud Hurlbut, who also built and operated the mine train ride and log ride at Knott's Berry Farm.

Rolling stock is often modeled after real railroad equipment, as far as being painted with logos of past or existing railroads. Boxcars, flat cars, tank cars and cabooses are common. For passenger use, special cars are constructed, with a low center of gravity for safety.

== See also ==
- Children's railway
- Model railway scales
- Ridable miniature railway
- Model engineering
- Train ride
