= LBSC =

LBSC may refer to:

- California State University, Long Beach, California, United States
- Curly Lawrence (1883–1967), British model steam locomotive designer who wrote under the pen name 'L.B.S.C.'
- London, Brighton and South Coast Railway, a former English railway company
