= C. E. Bowden =

British military officer, RFC pilot & aeromodeller (1897-1984)

- Bowden pictured in a profile from Model Engineer magazine in 1937
- Birth name: Claude Evelyn Bowden
- Born: 11 October 1897
- Died: 9 October 1984 (aged 86)
- Allegiance: United Kingdom
- Rank: Lieutenant colonel

Lieutenant colonel Claude Evelyn Bowden (11 October 1897 – 9 October 1984) was a British military officer, RFC pilot and one of the most well-known aeromodellers in the 1920s to 1950s.

== Early life ==
Bowden was born on 11 October 1897, the son of Rev. H. A. Bowden. He went to Radley College, a boarding school in rural Oxfordshire, entering in Summer Term 1910 and leaving to enter military service in 1914.

At Radley he set up a model aeroplane club; all the members of this club went on to serve with the Royal Flying Corps in the Great War, including Thomas Langford-Sainsbury who went on to become an Air vice-marshal and commanded British Air Forces in Egypt during World War II.

== Military service ==
He entered service in 1914, serving in France and Palestine during the Great War and rose to lieutenant in the Duke of Cornwall's Light Infantry. In 1918 he was promoted to captain in the Royal Flying Corps/Royal Air Force, where he was a single-seat scout pilot.

Following the war he returned to Army service. Bowden served in India as a subaltern and recounted an eventful journey in his "glamorous" A V Monocar with his Colonel's charming daughter.

He became a major in 1938 and lieutenant colonel in 1939. During World War II in the Royal Army Service Corps he was an acting colonel in 1942, and retired as lieutenant colonel in 1946. His military career included time at RAF College Cranwell, where he was a contemporary of Westbury, Frank Whittle and T. E. Lawrence (Lawrence of Arabia).

== Aeromodelling ==
Universally known as "C.E. Bowden", Percival Marshall said of him:

My friend Capt. Bowden has done more than any other man in the world to popularize and develop interest in petrol-driven model aircraft. His work is known throughout the world, and he will go down in posterity as the man who demonstrated the practicability of model aircraft powered by tiny internal combustion engines.

— Foreword, Bowden's book Petrol Engined Model Aeroplanes, Percival Marshall & Co. Ltd, London, 1937

He achieved successful powered flight with a model using E.T. Westbury's Atom Minor engine:

His association with the late Edgar Westbury had considerable influence on petrol engine design, notably in the Atom series, and it was the Atom II that he established a new duration record in 1932, comfortably exceeding Stranger's record which had stood since 1912.

— "Smoke Rings", Obituary, Model Engineer, No. 3472, 7 December 1984

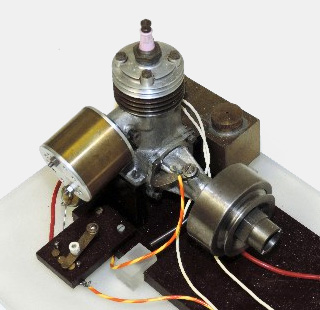
Atom Minor internal combustion engine by E.T. Westbury

He went on to establish internal-combustion-powered model flight duration records, initially of seventy-one seconds in 1932 with Kanga and in 1936 with his Blue Dragon, also powered by Atom Minor. The same powerplant was used in the hydroplane Jildi Junior to set the 15cc Class C hydroplane record in 1934. In 1937 he achieved the first officially observed "rise off water" flight in Great Britain with a model petrol-powered flying boat.

Following the Second World War, he pioneered radio-controlled flight and also made significant innovations with radio-controlled boats and the design of both model and full-size yachts. He wrote prolifically on these subjects.

In 1943 he was appointed Vice-President of the SMAE (Society of Model Aeronautical Engineers) which later became the British Model Flying Association. Other past vice-presidents included Lord Brabazon.

== Personal life ==
In 1924 he married Jesse Grace Holmes, daughter of Rev. W. P. Holmes. He died on 9 October 1984.

== Publications ==
- Model Glow Plug Engines, Percival Marshall & Co. Ltd., London, 1949
- The History and Technical Development of Model Aircraft, The Drysdale Press Ltd. for The Harborough Publishing Company Ltd., Leicester, 1946
- Petrol Engined Model Aircraft, Percival Marshall & Co. Ltd., London, 1937
- Model Jet Reaction Engines: With Notes for Suitable Models for Jet Engines, Percival Marshall & Co. Ltd., London, 1948
- Model Yacht Construction and Sailing, Percival Marshall & Co. Ltd., London, 1949; Reprinted. TEE Publishing, Limited. December 1994. ISBN 978-1-85761-090-1.
- Diesel Model Engines, Percival Marshall & Co. Ltd., London, 1948, revised 1951
