= Curly Lawrence =

British miniature locomotive engineer (1883–1967)

Lillian Lawrence
- Born: William Morris Benjamin; September 27, 1883
- Died: November 4, 1967 (aged 84)
- Other names: LBSC; Curly; William Morris Mathieson
- Occupations: Locomotive cleaner; Bus driver; Miniature locomotive engineer
- Spouse: Mabel Munt (m. 1908)

Lillian "Curly" Lawrence (September 27, 1883 – November 4, 1967), known as LBSC, was one of Britain's most prolific and well known model or scale-steam-locomotive designers. LBSC were the initials of Britain's London, Brighton and South Coast Railway, where she was employed in her youth.

== Early life ==
Lillian Lawrence, "Curly" to her friends, was born 27 September 1883 and christened William Morris Benjamin, later changing her surname to Mathieson when her father changed the family name. After 1902, she changed her name to Lillian Lawrence; she was previously nicknamed "Dolly" at school on account of her long, blond, curly hair, and was pictured on occasion wearing female shoes and clothing while driving her models. After the public transition of Roberta Cowell, Lawrence inquired if someone who transitioned would lose their membership in the Freemasons.

Despite her 'unusual make-up', as described by her friend George Barlow, her retiring nature, and the prejudices that may have existed in 1930s, she was readily accepted as an expert live steam model engineer. Lawrence had been making steam engines from tins and bits and pieces since childhood and her engineering skills were largely self taught. In 1908 she married Mabel (formerly Sarah) Munt.

Lawrence loved steam locomotives from the time she was a child. She spent several years in the employ of the LB&SC Railway, joining as an engine cleaner at the New Cross Locomotive Depot and working her way up to trainee fireman. Around 1902 she left the railway for the London Underground but negative health effects soon led her to find work as a tram and bus driver instead. She later became an inspector for the Tilling Group, and head of a factory for aircraft parts during the First World War.

== Battle of the boilers ==
The turning point in Lawrence's life was in 1922 when she sparked what became known as the "battle of the boilers" with Henry Greenly. Within two and half years she was established as one of the top professionals in scale or model engineering. Lawrence contended that scale locomotives should be fitted with fire-tube boilers modeled very closely on full-size locomotive practice i.e. be coal fired, with multiple fire-tubes and a number of superheater elements, as compared with then commercial and hobbyist practice of building spirit fuelled, water-tube boilers.

Lawrence's live steam locomotive type boilers proved to be outstanding steamers, capable of hauling passengers. Her 2 1/2 in (64 mm) gauge four coupled wheel locomotive, Ayesha (named after a character in the novel She: A History of Adventure by H. Rider Haggard), could haul 200 pounds (90 kg), when the equivalent sized spirit fired water-tube locomotives of the day could only haul 30 pounds (15 kg). Lawrence demonstrated this locomotive at the Society of Model & Experimental Engineers meeting in London in July 1922, as a result of which she was invited to contribute an article to Model Engineer magazine describing its construction. In 1924, the "battle of the boilers" between a Henry Greenly designed Bassett-Lowke spirit fired locomotive and one of Lawrence's designs vindicated her claims, though it led to a lifelong animosity between her and Greenly. Ayesha, now owned by The National 2½ inch Gauge Association, was steamed in June 2016 for the first time in more than 50 years and, after a hydraulic boiler test, ran successfully more than 90 years after the locomotive was built by Lawrence.

== Writing ==
Lillian Lawrence wrote construction articles for various British model engineering magazines from 1923 until 1967, shortly before her death. Lawrence wrote nearly 2,600 articles for Model Engineer Magazine from January 1922 (initially in the form of letters to the Editor and then from April 1923 as a full-time contributor) to May 1959 and then again from January 1966 until October 1967. During this time, Lawrence designed 166 different locomotives, ranging from 0 gauge up to 5 inch gauge, building over 50 herself. Many of these designs are still available today as sets of drawings, and some were later produced in book form.

== Track gauges ==
Before Lawrence started publishing in the 1920s, model locomotive practice had been divided into two camps. The first encompassed steam locomotives that ran on a gauge of 10 1/4 in (260 mm) or greater which followed full scale practice in terms of boiler design and operation, exemplified by the 15 in (381 mm) gauge Romney, Hythe and Dymchurch Railway in Kent, designed by Henry Greenly. The second encompassed locomotives of 2 1/2 in (64 mm) gauge or less, designed only to look like full size locomotives while running on spirit-fired boilers, typified by those manufactured by Bassett-Lowke. These latter locomotives were usually run on garden railway layouts hauling groups of model carriages around the track. The gauges between 2½ and 10¼ inch essentially did not exist.

Capable of hauling their drivers, Lawrence's coal-fired designs were rapidly adopted by model railway engineers. Development of coal-fired boilers in the smaller scales (0, 1.75 in (44.45 mm) and 2 1/2 in (64 mm) gauges) catalysed development of the larger 3 1/2 in (89 mm), 5 in (127 mm) and 7 1/4 in (184 mm) gauges. This is reflected in the range of Lawrence's designs; in the 1920s she produced 27 designs in the smaller scales versus only 1 of 3 1/2 in (89 mm) or larger, in the 1930s 50 designs in the smaller scales versus 7 in the larger, in the 1940s 17 versus 19, 1950s 10 versus 21 and finally in the 1960s 2 versus 5.

== Legacy ==
Lawrence contended that anyone with enough desire could build a working steam locomotive. Many of her designs were based on actual engines, though they were usually modified and simplified for home builders. All were robust and performed well. Her notes on various aspects of locomotive construction were compiled into a book called Shops, Shed, and Road, first published in 1929 and still considered to be a standard reference for model engineers (republished in 1950 as The Live Steam Book and in 1969 as LBSC's Shop, Shed and Road). Through her articles, Lawrence introduced many enthusiasts to the joys of machine shop work and miniature steam locomotives. "An enigmatic character, not to mention one who had almost no ability to tolerate criticism of her work, she nevertheless had a natural empathy with her readers and a remarkable knack of making the most complicated workshop procedures sound utterly straightforward". Countless locomotives built to her plans still operate on model railway tracks around the world. She died on 4 November 1967, having made her last contribution to Model Engineer magazine only one month before. Lawrence's legacy includes 113 published and 29 unpublished designs, including some of the most popular ones as follows:

=== 2½ inch gauge ===
- Annie Boddie, Midland Railway style 4-4-0 tender engine, Model Engineer, 1933
- Austere Ada, War Department Austerity 2-8-0 tender engine, Model Engineer, 1943
- Ayesha, LB&SCR Atlantic 4-4-2 tender engine, the locomotive which initiated the Battle of the Boilers in 1924, English Mechanics, 1930
- Canadian Switcher, Canadian National style 0-6-0 Switcher tank engine, Model Engineer, 1929
- Caterpillar, Lawrence's freelance 4-12-2 tender engine design based on the Union Pacific 9000 Class with 3 or 4 cylinders, English Mechanics, 1932
- Fayette, Anglo-American 4-6-2 Pacific tender engine, Model Engineer, 1928
- Green Arrow, LNER V2, 2-6-2 tender engine. 3 cylinders with Holcroft conjugated valve gear, English Mechanics, 1936
- GWR 1695, GWR, open cab 0-6-0ST saddle tank engine, English Mechanics, 1939
- Helen Long, LBSC freelance 4-8-4T express tank engine design with 3 cylinders, Model Engineer, 1927
- Kingette, GWR King Class 4-6-0 4 cylinder tender engine, Model Engineer, 1932
- Lady Kitty, GWR 4700 Class, 2-8-0 tender engine, Model Engineer, 1929
- LMS 4652, LMS Fowler Class 4F, 0-6-0 tender engine, English Mechanics, 1937
- Mabel Hall, GWR Hall Class, 4-6-0 tender engine, English Mechanics, 1932
- Mary Anne, LNER Class J39, 0-6-0 tender engine, Model Engineer, 1934
- Olympiade, LMS Jubilee Class, 4-6-0 tender engine, Model Engineer, 1938
- Princess Royal, LMS Princess Class, 4-6-2 Pacific tender engine, English Mechanics, 1933
- Purley Grange, GWR Grange Class, 4-6-0 tender engine, Model Engineer, 1937
- Rose, GER Class T26, 2-4-0 tender engine, Model Engineer, 1957
- Uranus, GWR style 4-8-4 tender engine, English Mechanics, 1932
- US Austerity, American style WWII Austerity, 2-8-0 tender engine, English Mechanics, 1943

=== 3½ inch gauge ===
- Betty, Lawrence's might-have-been Maunsell type SR 2-6-2 tender engine, subsequently published in book form, British Model Maker, 1956
- Britannia, BR Class 7 4-6-2 Pacific tender engine. Lawrence used much information made available to her by her friend Robert Riddles during her development of the full-size engine, Model Engineer 1951
- BR 75000, British Railways 4-6-0 class 4 tender engine, the last design Lawrence produced for English Mechanics magazine, English Mechanics 1956
- Canterbury Lamb, Canterbury and Whitstable Railway, 0-4-0 tender engine of 1830, Model Engineer, 1952
- Evening Star, BR standard class 9F 2-10-0 freight tender engine, the last steam engine built for BR, Lawrence's design was completed by Martin Evans, subsequently published in book form, Practical Mechanics 1963
- Hielan Lassie, Thompson rebuild of the LNER A1/1 Pacific tender engine. Described with slide or piston valves and both Walschaerts and Baker valve gear, Model Engineer, 1946
- Ivy Hall, LBSC's "modernised" GWR Hall Class, 4-6-0 tender engine, Model Engineer, 1955
- Juliet, beginner's 0-4-0 tank engine, Model Engineer, 1946
- Lickham Hall, Authentic reproduction of GWR Hall Class 4-6-0 tender engine. Designed for Reeves in 1956
- Maisie, Great Northern C1 Atlantic 4-4-2 tender engine, subsequently published in book form, Model Engineer, 1935
- Mona, LNER 0-6-2T style tank engine, with inside cylinders and Hackworth valve gear, subsequently published in book form, British Model Maker, 1956/57. Also for 1.75" gauge.
- Miss Ten-to-Eight, North Eastern R1 (later LNER D21 class) 4-4-0 tender engine, Model Engineer, 1939
- Molly, LMS Fowler Class 3F tank engine 0-6-0 "Jinty", Model Engineer, 1941
- Netta, North Eastern T1 (later LNER Q5 class) 0-8-0 tender engine, described simultaneously in gauge O, 1¾, 2½, 3½ and 5-inch gauges, Model Engineer, 1954
- Pamela, Lawrence's idea for rebuilding the SR Merchant Navy class 4-6-2 Pacific tender engine, Model Engineer, 1950
- Petrolea, Great Eastern T19 (later LNER E4 class) 2-4-0 inside cylinder tender engine, Model Engineer, 1943
- Princess Marina, LMS Stanier Mogul 2-6-0 tender engine, subsequently published in book form, English Mechanics 1935
- P.V. Baker, 0-6-0T tank engine. Piston Valve, Baker valve gear, Model Engineer, 1945
- Rainhill, 0-2-2 tender engine inspired by Stephenson's Rocket in its original form, Model Engineer, 1941
- Tich, 0-4-0T LBSC's freelance contractor's tank engine designed with both small and large-boilers, with slip-eccentric or Walschaerts valve gear, subsequently published in book form, Model Engineer, 1948 & 1959
- Virginia, 4-4-0 American tender engine, described in both "old time" and modern guises, subsequently published in book form, Model Engineer, 1956

=== 5-inch gauge ===
- Eva May, 0-6-0T freelance tank engine. Lawrence's first 5-inch design. There was a tender version as well, English Mechanics 1933
- Maid of Kent, 4-4-0 tender engine, a South Eastern & Chatham Railway L1 class, Model Engineer, 1948
- Minx, London, Brighton & South Coast Railway C2x 0-6-0 tender engine, Model Engineer, 1948
- Pansy, GWR 0-6-0PT pannier tank engine, Model Engineer, 1958
- Speedy, GWR 15xx 0-6-0T tank engine, subsequently published in book form, English Mechanics 1950
- Titfield Thunderbolt, 0-4-2 tender engine based on the Liverpool & Manchester Railway's "Lion", Model Engineer, 1953

== Published books ==
- LBSC (2004) [1929]. Shop, Shed and Road - The Live Steam Book. TEE Publishing. ISBN 1-85761-121-7.
- LBSC (1960) [1934]. Betty, The Mongoliper 2-6-2 in 3½ inch Gauge. Model & Allied Publications.
- LBSC (1960) [1949]. How to Build Princess Marina, LMS 2-6-0 Mogul in 3½ inch Gauge. Model & Allied Publications.
- LBSC (1978) [1960]. Building Speedy, A GW 0-6-0 Tank in 5 inch Gauge. TEE Publishing. ISBN 0-85242-538-4.
- LBSC (1975). LBSC's famous 4-4-0 Virginia. Model & Allied Publications. ISBN 0-85242-411-6.
- LBSC (1977). Maisie, Words and Music. TEE Publishing.
- LBSC; Martin Evans (1976) [1968]. Simple Locomotive Building - Introducing LBSC's Tich. Model & Allied Publications. ISBN 0-85242-786-7.
- Martin Evans; LBSC (1980). Evening Star - Building a 3½ inch Gauge BR 2-10-0 Locomotive. Argus Books. ISBN 0-85242-634-8.
- LBSC (1922–1967). "approx. 2,600 articles for". Model Engineer magazine. currently published by MyHobbyStore, Orpington, Kent, UK.

== See also ==
- Model engineering
- Martin Evans
- Rideable miniature railway
