= Model Railways and Locomotives Magazine =

Model Railways and Locomotive Magazine was an early British magazine devoted to railway modelling. It existed between January 1909 and September 1918 when it was renamed Models

== History and profile ==
The first volume was published in January 1909. The founder was Henry Greenly. It was edited by Henry Greenly and W J Bassett-Lowke, who are well known in the history of model railways. Henry Greenly was a prolific author, while Bassett-Lowke went on to found a model railway manufacturing company which still exists as part of the Hornby company.

Model Railways and Locomotive Magazine was published on a monthly basis. The magazine was informative on railway lore and carried many construction articles. It ceased publication in 1916.
