= Dock shunter =

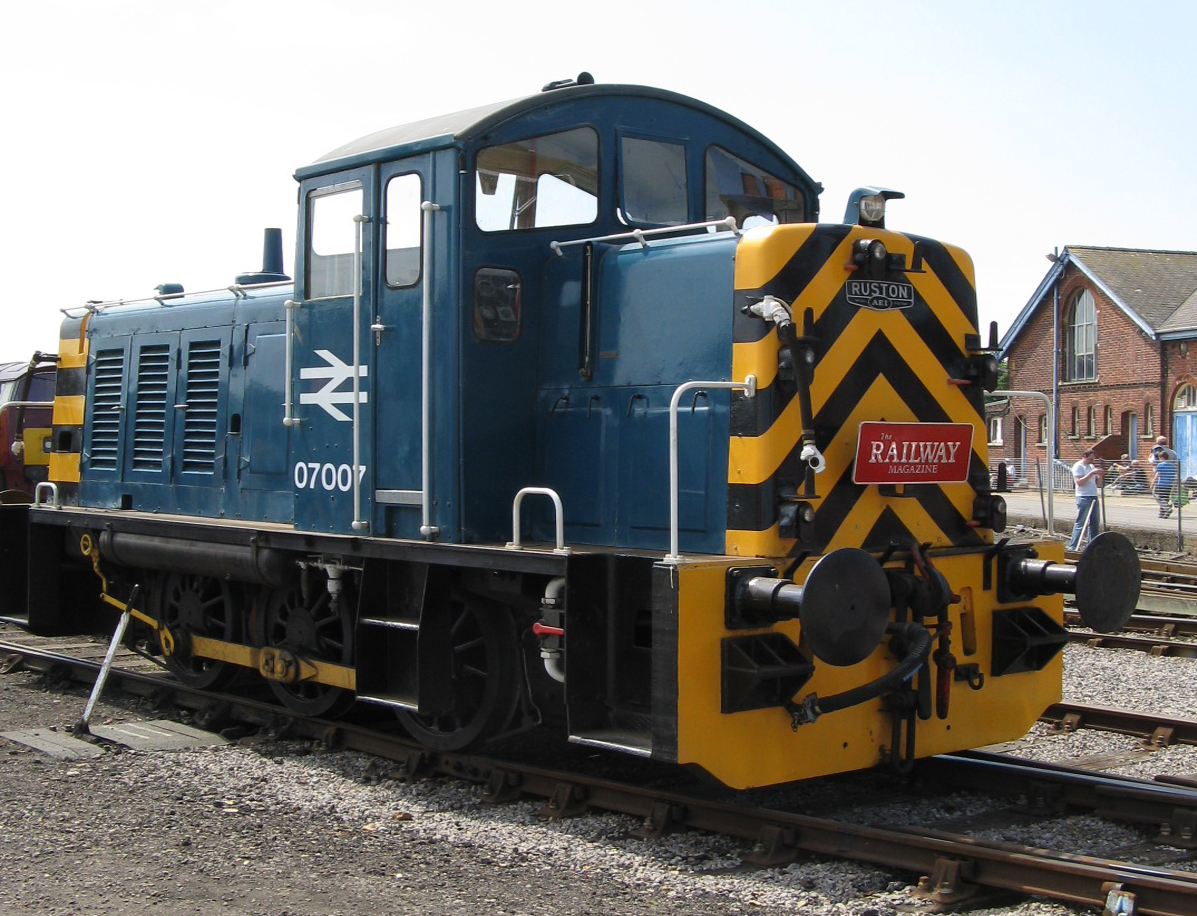
Dock shunter 07007 at Eastleigh

A dock shunter, "dock tank", or "docksider", is a locomotive (formerly steam but now usually diesel) used for shunting wagons in the vicinity of docks. It is usually of 0-4-0 or 0-6-0 wheel arrangement and has a short wheelbase and large buffers. These features make it suitable for negotiating sharp curves.

== Examples ==
- GWR 1101 Class
- GWR 1361 Class
- GWR 1366 Class
- LSWR B4 class
- LB&SCR E2 class
- SR USA class
- British Rail Class 07
- LMS Fowler Dock Tank
- LMS Kitson 0-4-0ST
- NLR Class 75
- Bagnall 0-4-0ST "Alfred" and "Judy"
- LSWR G6 class
- LNER J63
- LNWR Dock Tank
- LNER Y9
- NER Class H / LNER Y7
- Caledonian Railway 498 Class
- NBR F class

== See also ==
- Switcher
