= Edgar T. Westbury =

Edgar T. Westbury was perhaps best known as a major contributor to the English recreational magazine Model Engineer. He contributed under his own name, and also under the pseudonyms 'Artificer', 'Ned', 'Kinemette' and Exactus. Beginning in 1925 until his death in 1970, he made over 1474 authored contributions to Model Engineer under his real name. As Artificer, he wrote a further 135 articles from 1936 to 1970, on a range of topics including basic workshop skills and techniques, and construction of a light vertical milling machine. Ned was the nom-de-plume for writing about workshop equipment, under which he wrote about 159 articles. As Kinemette came a further 67 contributions from 1936 to 1959, on making optical equipment including slide and film projectors, and enlargers.

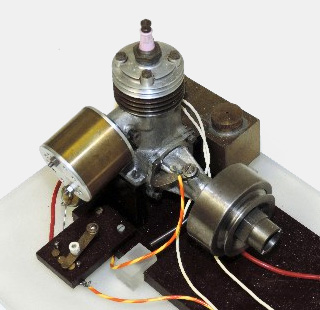
Atom Minor IC engine by E.T. Westbury

Westbury was born in 1896. He served in the Royal Navy during the latter part of the First World War. In the late 1920s he was an instructor in the RAF. His "Atom Minor" engine of 1926 was the first of his to fly a model aeroplane in collaboration with Colonel C. E. Bowden breaking a new model flight endurance record, it later broke a model hydroplane speed record in one of Bowden's boats. During World War Two, he developed a number of small petrol driven generators for use by the armed forces. He was editor of Model Engineer for a time, and from 1966 was technical consultant under the magazine's new management with Martin Evans as editor. Westbury died on 3 May 1970. A significant collection of Westbury's engines are held by the Society of Model and Experimental Engineers and are currently undergoing restoration by students of West Dean College.

His era spanned what might be called the 'late industrial period' in Britain, a time when Britain was in the throes of austerity and manufactured goods were expensive, mechanical skills were relatively common, and the only way to obtain extra luxuries was to make them yourself. His aptitude, and the mechanical craftsman ethos he represented, was eulogised in the fictional character based on him in Nevil Shute's last novel, Trustee from the Toolroom. His most enduring work was that on model internal combustion engines, with at least one commercial company, Hemingway Kits, still selling the castings with which to machine and build the various models he designed.

== Books published ==
Edgar Westbury wrote more than a dozen books, including:

- Small internal combustion engines: a practical handbook for the user of small gas, petrol or paraffin oil stationary engines. Percival Marshall, 1937.
- Modern optical projectors: a practical handbook on the principles and construction of optical projection appliances for the lecture room, laboratory and workshop. Percival Marshall, 1937.
- Capstan and turret lathes: setting and operation. Percival Marshall, 1940.
- Automatic Lathes and Screw Machines: practical handbook on their mechanism, uses and operation. Percival Marshall, 1940.
- A practical treatise on hot air engines. 1940.
- Grinding, lapping and honing: the application of abrasive processes to finishing surfaces ... Maidenhead, Berkshire, 1941.
- Lathe Accessories, how to make and use them: practical instructions for making numerous ingenious accessories for metal turning lathes. Percival Marshall, 1943; 2nd ed. M.A.P., 1964.
- Model Petrol Engines: their design, construction and use. Percival Marshall, 1947.
- Milling in the Lathe. Percival Marshall, 1948; reprint 1951; reprint M.A.P., 1973.
- Ignition Equipment. Percival Marshall, 1948.
- Flash steam: its application in model and full-size practice. Percival Marshall, 1949.
- The history of model power boats. Percival Marshall, 1950.
- The "M. E." lathe manual. Percival Marshall, 1951.
- Internal Combustion Engines. The Mechanical Age Library. London: Frederick Muller Ltd. 1959.
- Motor Cars Today. London: A. Barker, 1962.
- Turbines: steam, water and gas. Percival Marshall, 1964.
- Motor Car Engineering. The Young Engineer series. London: Weidenfeld and Nicolson, (2nd ed.) 1967.
- Metal Turning Lathes: their design, application and operation. Hemel Hempstead (UK): Model and Allied Publications Ltd., 1967 (2nd ed. 1977).
- — (1974). Building A Steam Engine From Castings. Model and Allied Publications. ISBN 085344062X.
- — (1995). Model Engineer's Lathe Manual (revised ed.). TEE Publishing. ISBN 1857610989.

== See also ==
- Model engineering
