= Edward Exley Limited =

Edward Exley Limited is a manufacturer of model railway equipment, particularly ready-to-run coaches in 0 gauge and 00 gauge and a one-time major competitor to Hornby and Bassett-Lowke. The company was founded in about 1920 by its namesake in Bradford, Yorkshire, England.

== History ==
Founded at Bradford by Edward Exley about 1920, the products were initially locomotives, in live steam, clockwork and electrically powered, in gauges 0 and 1, which were made to order. By the 1930s, 0 gauge coaches had joined the range of products, probably Exley's most successful line. In the later 1930s high quality 00 gauge coaching stock was added to feed a growing market in this new scale.

By 1952 Edward Exley (Sales) Ltd had moved to Baslow in Derbyshire and Edward Exley had resigned as a Director of the Sales Company in July 1955.

Locomotives were made available after the war, mainly to order, but in the late 1950s Edward Exley sold the loco construction part of the business to Stanley Beeson, who had made locos for a number of Exley clients. Coaches were listed until 1962 when there was a terrible fire which destroyed the Bradford premises and most of the tools. At this point Edward Exley decided to retire.

The company at Baslow continued to offer coaches but discontinued the 00 gauge range as the manufacturing facility was lost in the fire. The 0 gauge models were listed as available until January 1995, but were in fact being made by outside workers to order.

Because of the premium nature of Exley's products, they tend to be well preserved, and many examples survive today. They are highly collectible and good examples of 0 gauge coaches often change hands at auction for hundreds of pounds.

The company is still in existence, although it is not currently trading. Most recently it has acted as a restoration company for existing Exley models and as a point of contact for technical queries.
