= Caledonian Railway 498 Class =

Class of British 0-6-0T locomotives

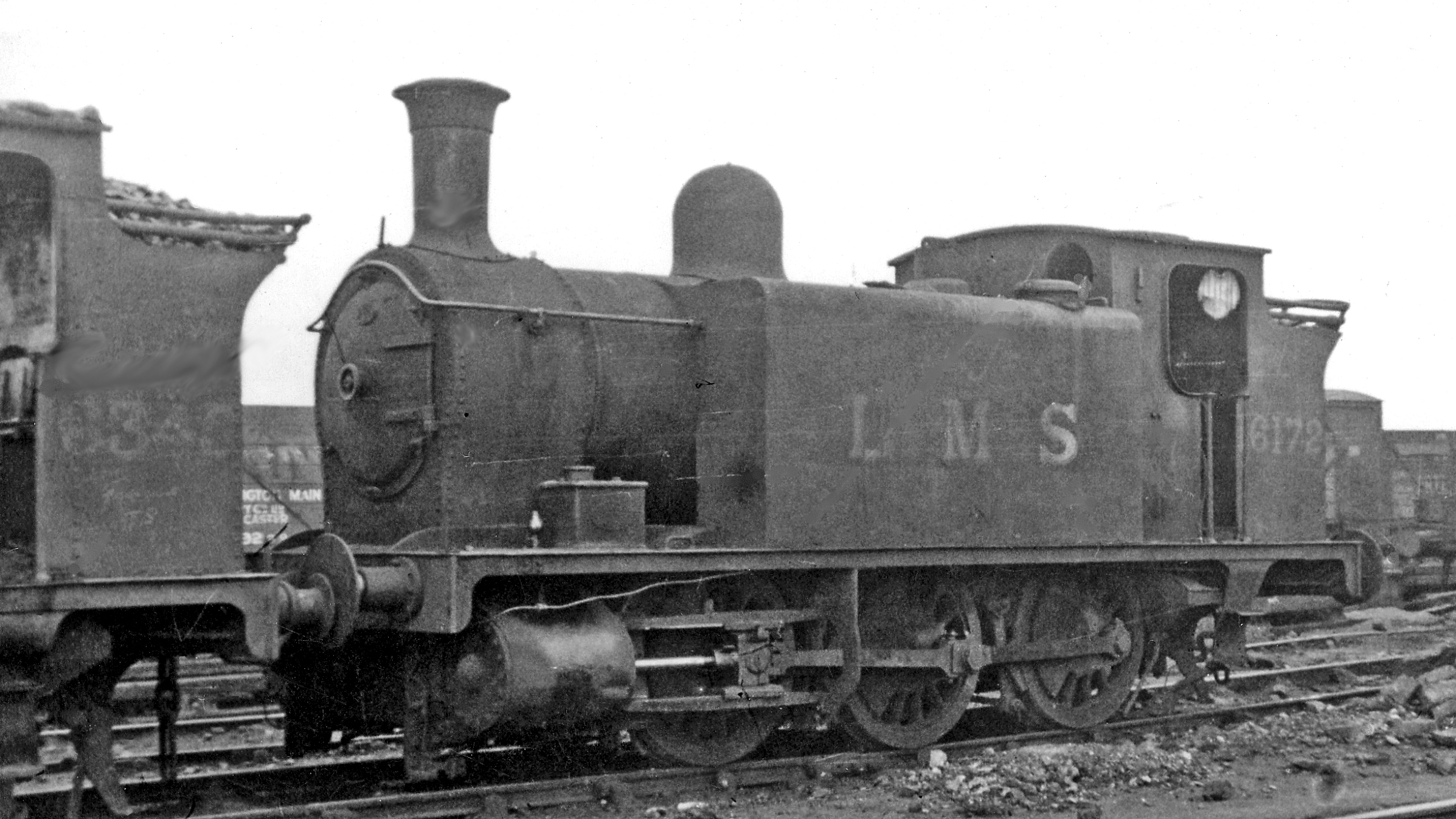
- No. 16172 at Motherwell Locomotive Depot 15 August 1948
Type and origin
- Power type: Steam
- Designer: John F. McIntosh
- Builder: St. Rollox Works
- Build date: 1911-1921
- Total produced: 23
Specifications
- Configuration
  - Whyte: 0-6-0T
  - UIC: C
- Gauge: 4 ft 8 1/2 in (1,435 mm) standard gauge
- Driver dia.: 4 ft 0 in (1,219 mm)
- Loco weight: 47.75 long tons (48.52 t; 53.48 short tons)
- Fuel type: Coal
- Boiler pressure: 160 lbf/in^{2} (1.10 MPa)
- Superheater: None
- Cylinders: Two, outside
- Cylinder size: 17 in × 22 in (432 mm × 559 mm)
- Valve gear: Stephenson
Performance figures
- Tractive effort: 18,015 lbf (80.1 kN)
Career
- Operators: CR, LMS, BR
- Class: CR: 498
- Power class: LMS/BR: 2F
- Locale: Scottish Region
- Withdrawn: 1958–1962
- Disposition: All scrapped

The Caledonian Railway 498 Class was a class of 0-6-0Ts built for dock shunting. They were designed by John F. McIntosh for the Caledonian Railway (CR) and introduced in 1911. Twenty-three were built. They passed to the London, Midland and Scottish Railway (LMS) in 1923 and to British Railways (BR) in 1948. Their numbers are shown in the table below.

The 498 Class was the prototype for the popular 3 1/2" gauge live steam locomotive design 'Rob Roy' by Martin Evans.

== Numbering table ==
CR nos.	Quantity	LMS nos.	BR nos.
498-499	2	16151-16152	56151-56152
527-538	12	16153-16164	56153-56164
502-504	3	16165-16167	56165-56167
510-515	6	16168-16173	56168-56173

The engines were withdrawn between 1958 and 1962.

== See also ==
- Locomotives of the Caledonian Railway
- Locomotives of the London, Midland and Scottish Railway
