= GWR 0-6-0PT =

British steam locomotive type

The GWR 0-6-0PT (pannier tank), is a type of steam locomotive built by the British Great Western Railway with the water tanks carried on both sides of the boiler, in the manner of panniers. They were used for local, suburban and branch line passenger and goods traffic, for shunting duties, and as banker engines on inclines. The early examples, such as the 1901 and 2021 classes, were rebuilt from saddle or side tanks when the locos received a Belpaire firebox – this type of firebox has a square top and is incompatible with a curved saddle tank. This process mostly took place during the tenure at Swindon Works of George Jackson Churchward. Only a very small number of saddle tank locomotives escaped rebuilding as panniers, notably the 1361 Class built new under Churchward in 1910, by which date a few of the 1813 Class had already been rebuilt as pannier tanks.

== Classification ==
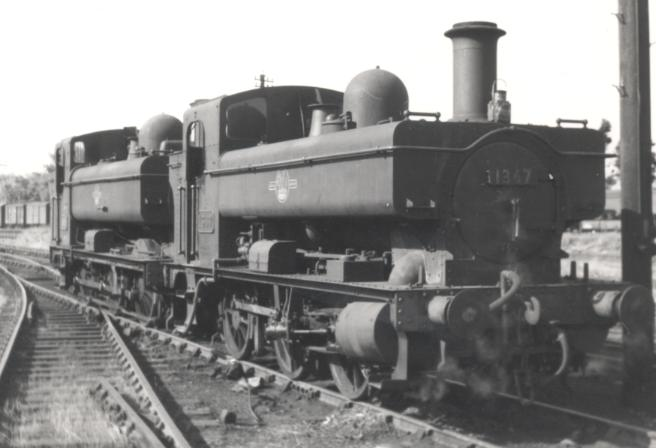
1366 Class No. 1367 at Weymouth in May 1961

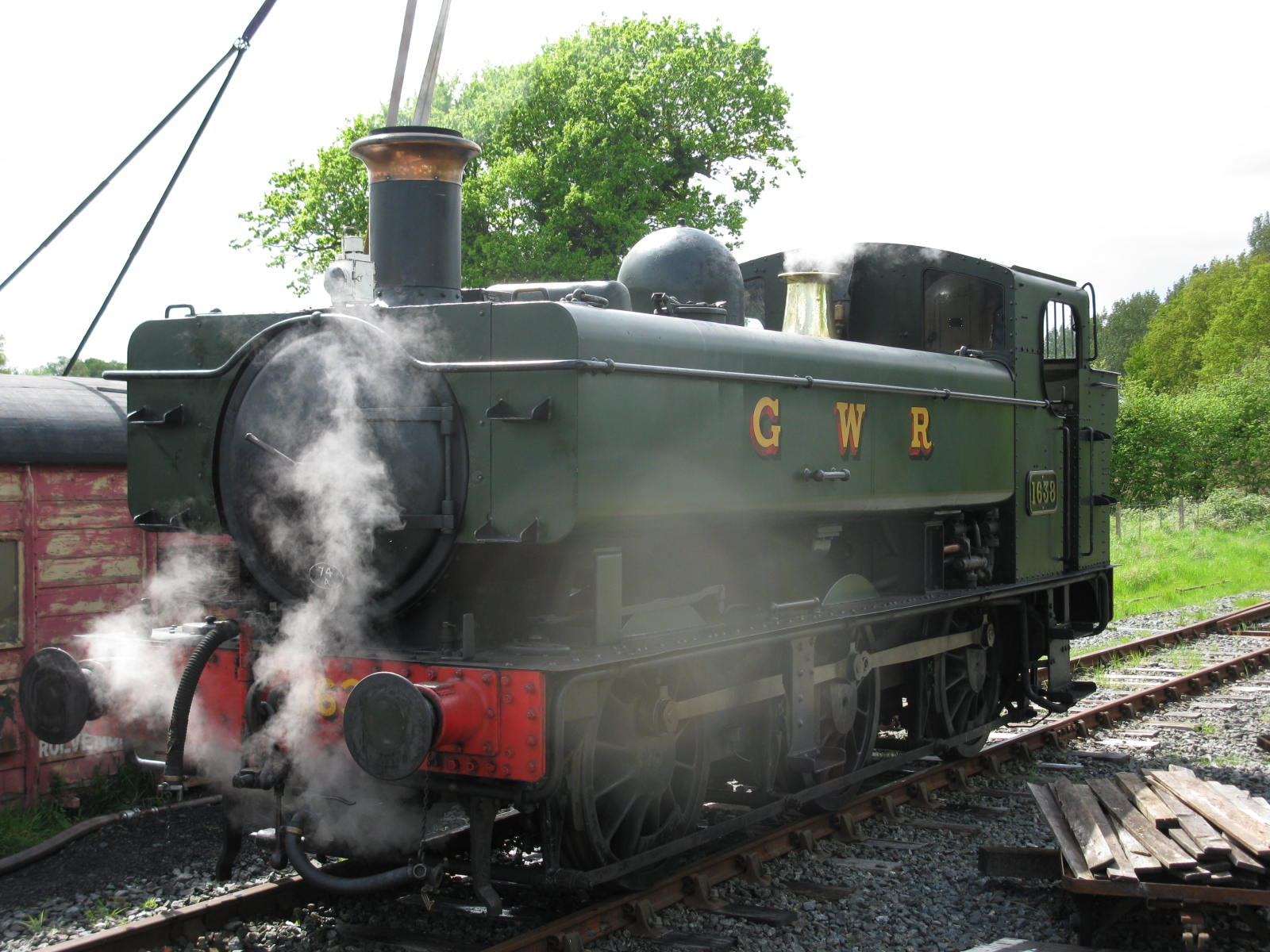
An old design recreated by Hawksworth: No. 1638 (built after Nationalisation) preserved on the Kent & East Sussex Light Railway

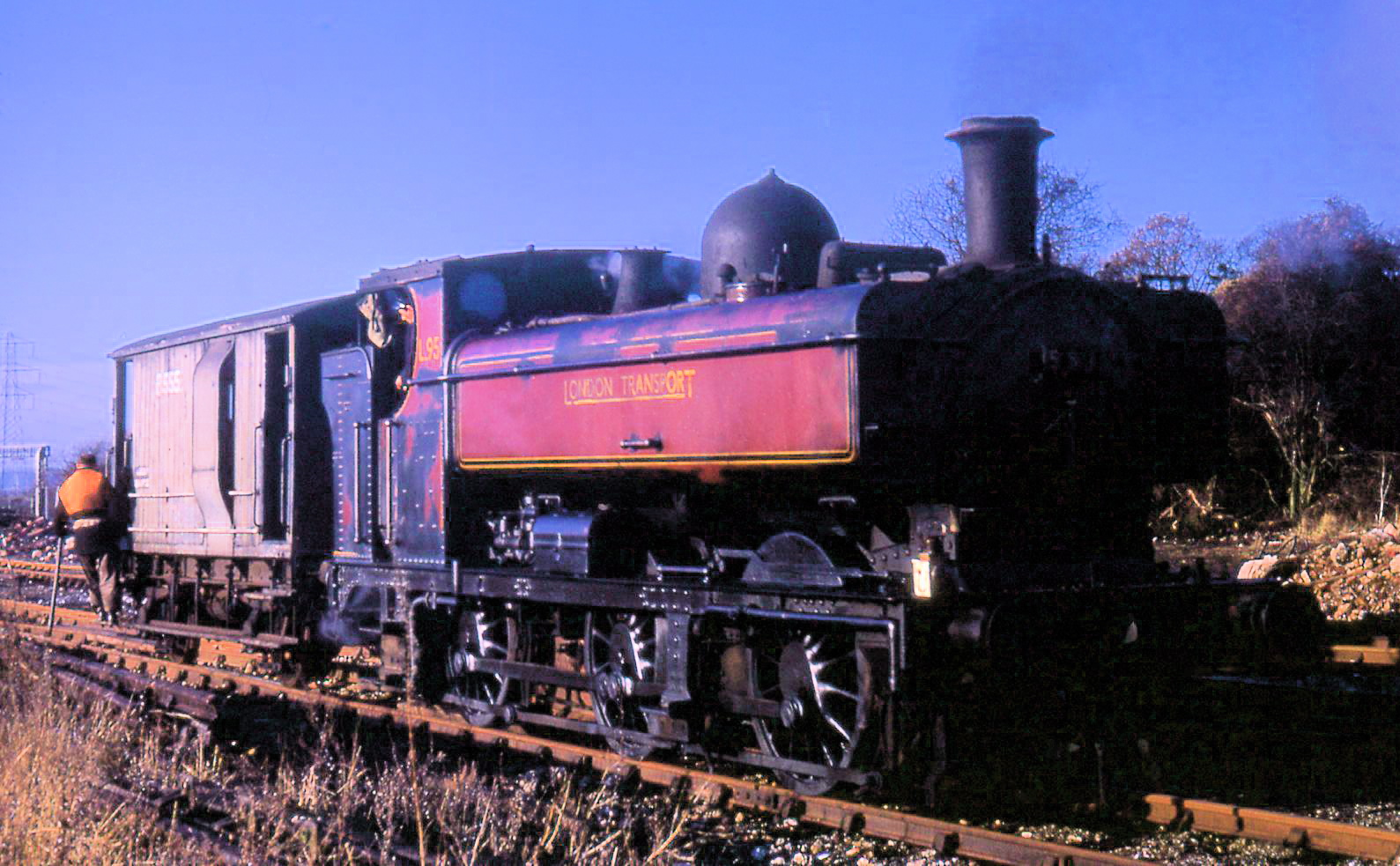
Ex-GWR 5700 class, London Transport No. L95 shunts at Croxley, 1969

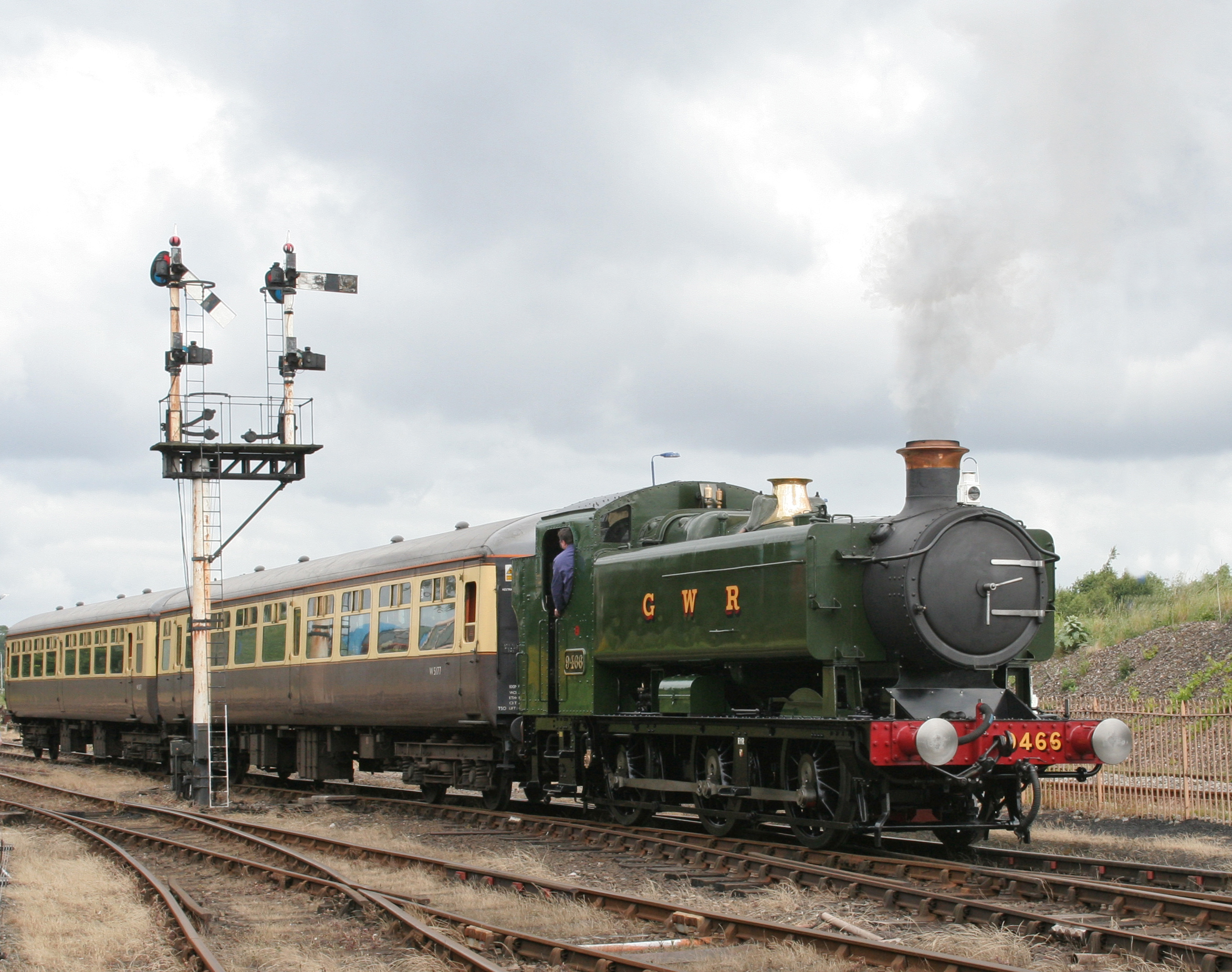
Another B.R. pannier in an unhistorical green livery: post-1948 No. 9466 at Tyseley

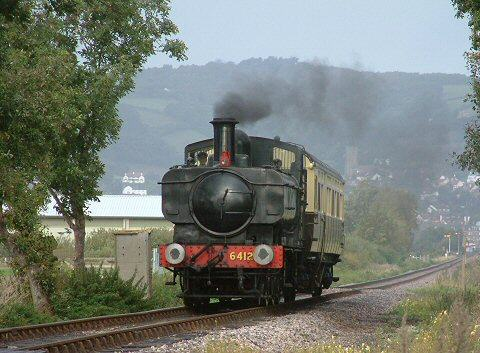
6400 Class No. 6412 hauling an autocoach on the West Somerset Railway, October 2000

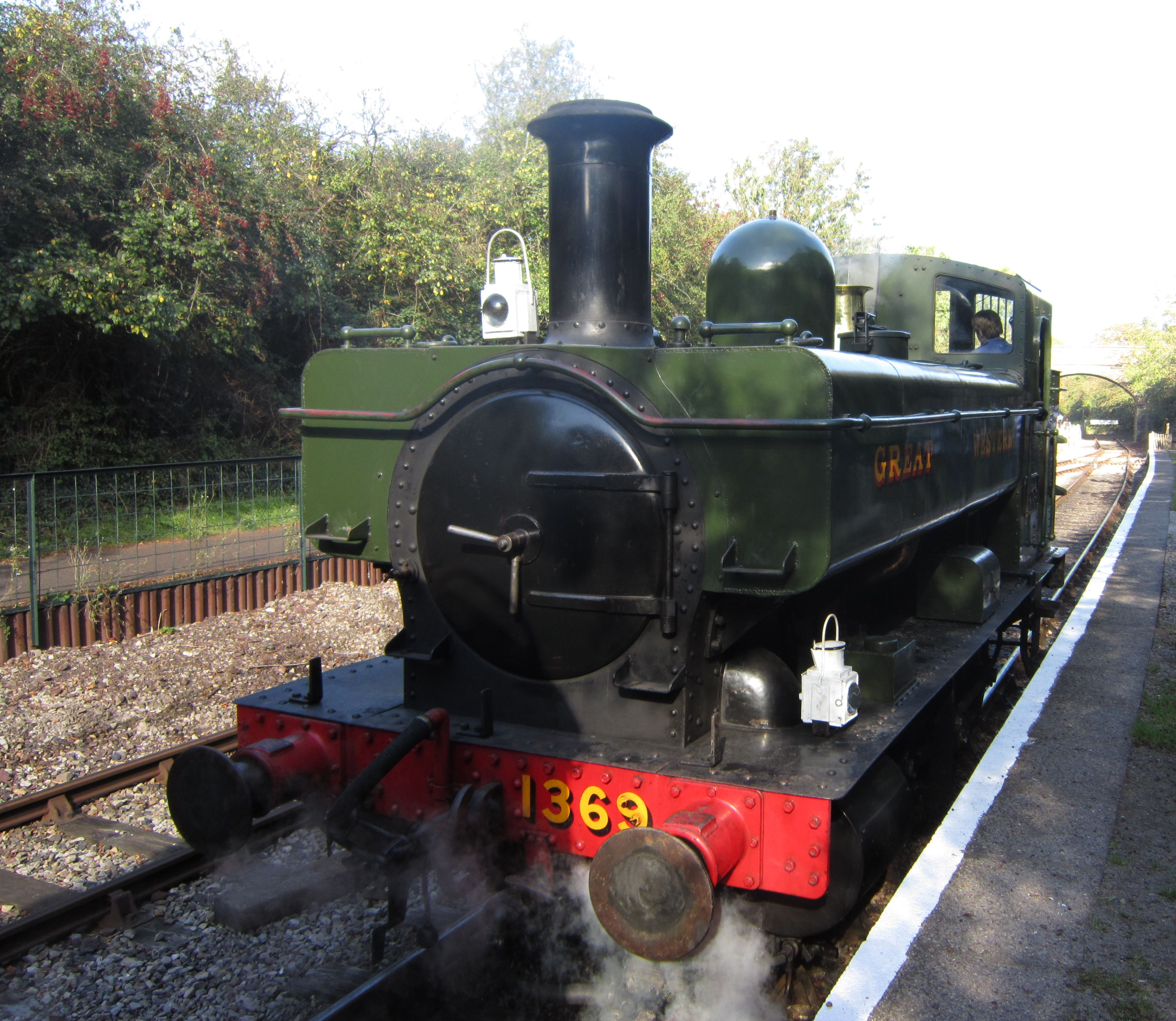
1366 Class No. 1369, Oldland Common railway station

The GWR pannier tank locomotives were classified as follows:

Small engines (wheelbase under 15'), rebuilt from saddle or side tanks

- 93, 850, 1901 Classes · G. Armstrong/W'hampton 1874–95, 292 locos
- 2021, 2101 Classes · Dean/W'hampton 1897–1905, 140 locos

Small engines (wheelbase under 15'), built as pannier tanks from new

- 5400 Class · Collett/Swindon 1930, 25 locos
- 6400, 7400 Classes · Collett/Swindon 1932–50, 90 locos
- 1366 Class · Collett/Swindon 1934, six locos
- 1600 Class · Hawksworth/Swindon 1949–55, 80 locos

Large engines (wheelbase over 15'), rebuilt from saddle or side tanks

- 302 Class · J. Armstrong/W'hampton 1864–65, eight locos
- 1016 Class · G. Armstrong/W'hampton 1867–71, eight locos
- 1076 (Buffalo), 1134 Classes · J. Armstrong/Swindon 1870–1881, 266 locos
- 645 and 1501 Classes · G. Armstrong/W'hampton 1872–81, 106 locos
- 119 Class · G. Armstrong/W'hampton (renewals after Gooch) 1878–83, 11 locos
- 322 Class · G. Armstrong/W'hampton (renewals after Beyer) 1878–85, six locos
- 1813 Class · Dean/Swindon 1882–84, 40 locos
- 1661 Class · Dean/Swindon 1886–87, 40 locos
- 655 Class · G. Armstrong/W'hampton 1892–97, 52 locos
- 1854 Class · Dean/Swindon 1890–95, 120 locos
- 2721 Class · Dean/Swindon 1897–1901, 80 locos

Large engines (wheelbase over 15'), built as pannier tanks from new

- GWR 5700 Class · Collett/Swindon and outside firms 1929–50, 863 locos (includes sub-class 8750)
- GWR 9400 Class · Hawksworth/Swindon and outside firms 1947–56, 210 locos

Large boiler/short wheelbase

- GWR 1500 Class · Hawksworth/Swindon 1949, 10 locos

== Preservation ==
Class	Number	Location
1366	1369	South Devon Railway
1500	1501	Severn Valley Railway
1600	1638	Kent and East Sussex Railway
8750	3650	Didcot Railway Centre
8750	3738	Didcot Railway Centre
8750	4612	Bodmin and Wenford Railway
5700	5764	Severn Valley Railway
5700	5775	Keighley and Worth Valley Railway
5700	5786	South Devon Railway
6400	6412	South Devon Railway
6400	6430	South Devon Railway
6400	6435	West Somerset Railway
5700	7714	Severn Valley Railway
5700	7715	Buckinghamshire Railway Centre
5700	7752	Tyseley Locomotive Works
5700	7754	Llangollen Railway
5700	7760	Tyseley Locomotive Works
9400	9400	Swindon Steam Railway Museum
9400	9466	Gloucestershire Warwickshire Railway
8750	9600	Tyseley Locomotive Works
8750	9629	Pontypool and Blaenavon Railway
8750	9642	Gloucestershire Warwickshire Railway
8750	9681	Dean Forest Railway
8750	9682	Dean Forest Railway

== In fiction ==
- In The Railway Series of children's books by the Wilbert Awdry and the television series Thomas & Friends the character Duck the Great Western Engine is based on a 5700 Class pannier tank.
- No. 5775 is in the 1970 film The Railway Children, in a brown livery, with the initials of the fictitious Great Northern and Southern Railway on the tank sides.
- No. 6412 is in the 1970s children's TV series The Flockton Flyer.
- No. 5764 is in the 1976 short film "The Signalman", loosely based on the Charles Dickens book of the same name.

== Sources ==
- Site with much detail information on boilers etc.
