= Saltwood Miniature Railway =

Rideable miniature railway in England

Coordinates: 51°4′45″N 1°4′47″E

- In the 1950s a double-headed (two locomotives) passenger train passes the engine sheds. The pilot engine (front engine) is 260 'Maid of Kent'; the train engine (further back) is 471 'Trojan'.

Overview
- Locale: Saltwood, England
- Dates of operation: 1924–1987
- Predecessor: Located at Sheffield 1920-1924

Technical
- Track gauge: 7 1/4 in (184 mm)
- Electrification: 1974

Other
- Website: http://saltwood.weebly.com

Saltwood Miniature Railway was a 7 1/4 in (184 mm) gauge miniature railway which first opened in Sheffield, but subsequently relocated to Saltwood in Kent, England. It closed in 1987.

At one point, the Saltwood Miniature Railway was the oldest extant miniature railway in the world.

== History ==
In 1920 Frank Clement Schwab and his son Alexander Carlisle Schwab began constructing a miniature railway line in the extensive gardens of their family home in Sheffield. The railway network which they established was extensive, and was served by a passenger carriage and several wagons, built by the father and son, both of whom were natural engineers. In 1922 Alex Schwab went up to Emmanual College, Cambridge to read Mechanical Sciences, and in the same year the railway took delivery of its first locomotive, supplied by the local Sheffield engineering firm of Jupp.

In 1924 the Schwab family relocated to Saltwood in Kent, and the railway was dismantled and then recreated in the grounds of the new home. In 1931 public open days commenced, in support of charitable causes, and this led to a considerable expansion of the passenger coach fleet, and also the rebuilding of the locomotive into a far more powerful design.

After World War II train services resumed and a steady pattern of service developed at Saltwood, seeing it outlive many of its contemporaries. Indeed, by the mid-1970s the available evidence suggested that the Saltwood line had become the oldest extant miniature railway in the world. The miniature railway author and engineer Tom Smith conducted world-wide research on this subject, and concluded that the Saltwood line was indeed the oldest miniature railway still operating. Dr Michael Taylor, the Editor of 7¼ Gauge News (the magazine of the 7¼" Gauge Society) wrote in 1987, about the Saltwood Miniature Railway: "Members should note that this line has been in operation since 1924 and a visit is equivalent to a Muslim's pilgrimage to Mecca".

During the 1960s a new house was constructed within the grounds of the railway, and at the same time the ornamental lake was drained and in-filled. This rendered the impressive bridge redundant, and brought an end to the scene of trains running over the lake, but following the dismantling of the bridge the track was relayed across the newly drained lake. At the same time Tanners Halt station was closed. During the early 1970s the steam locomotives were replaced with electric engines, and newer coaches were added to the passenger stock. There was no overlap of steam and electric operations, although the steam locomotive Maid of Kent remained in the engine shed into the start of the electric operations.

In 1987 the railway's owner Alexander Schwab died, and his executors took the decision to sell the assets of the Saltwood Miniature Railway in lots, and to close the line. Certain earthworks and sheds remained at the site of the railway, as well as other tangible reminders of the line including a deep locomotive inspection pit, a turntable pit, the main engine shed and erecting shop, and a lengthy, and elegant, brick tunnel; another survivor was the substantial locomotive air-raid shelter, designed to protect the engines from a direct hit by a German bomb. However, the track was all lifted, stations demolished, signals and other equipment disposed of, and the rolling stock relocated to a variety of new locations. The assorted buildings and the general route of the line, remained visible for more than a decade following closure. Subsequently, the entire site was acquired by property developers, and a new housing estate was constructed, rendering all final traces of the line lost.

== Locomotives ==
All Saltwood locomotives were built especially for the line, except Earl of Berkeley which was constructed for the Lechlade Light Railway, and bore the original name King of the Road, but was transferred to Saltwood (and renamed) whilst still less than a year old.

Number	Name	Locomotive type	Wheel arrangement	Builder	Entered service	Withdrawn	Notes
1	-	Steam	0-4-2 Tank	Jubb Engineering	1922	1928	Parts used in construction of next locomotive Fate: Disassembled
471	Trojan	Steam	4-4-2 Atlantic	F & A Schwab	1928	1970	Raven Atlantic, rebuilt 1929 as North British Atlantic; Fate: Now in private ownership
260	Maid of Kent	Steam	2-6-0 Mogul	F & A Schwab & Henry Greenly	1939	1975	Prototype of Maid of Kent Class; Fate: Now on the Great Cockcrow Railway
5060	Earl of Berkeley	Battery Electric	Bo'2'	Tom Smith	1974	1987	Double cab enclosed locomotive, built 1973; Fate: Believed scrapped in Norfolk around 1991.
7007	Great Western	Battery Electric	Bo'2'	Tom Smith	1976	1987	Designed by A Schwab; Fate: Now in private ownership & under restoration

=== Maid of Kent ===
Alex Schwab had an innovative design concept for a Great Western Railway-type locomotive of mogul wheel arrangement, but with an oversized boiler by GWR standards. He took these designs to Henry Greenly, arguably the foremost miniature railway engineer of the twentieth century, and formal plans were devised. Greenly's original drawings, based on Alex Schwab's sketches, are still housed in the Greenly archive collection. It is unknown who named the resulting prototype locomotive Maid of Kent, but Greenly had been the Chief Engineer of the Romney, Hythe and Dymchurch Railway, which itself had envisaged a locomotive of this name, although a last-minute change had resulted in this RH&DR engine being named 'Samson' instead. The Schwab/Greenly design became a classic of the miniature railway world, and many locomotives have been built in the 'Maid of Kent Class' in 5 in (127 mm), 7 1/4 in (184 mm), and 10 1/4 in (260 mm) gauges.

== See also ==
- Henry Greenly, railway engineer.
- The official website of the Saltwood Miniature Railway.
- "The World's Oldest Miniature Railway - The Saltwood Miniature Railway" by T J Smith, privately published 1978.
