= Martin Evans (model engineer) =

Martin Evans (1916 – 29 December 2003) was influential in the field of model engineering and locomotive design, and also worked as the technical editor and eventually managing editor of the English magazine Model Engineer. His editorship, along with other changes in staff, helped keep the magazine on track after experiencing some decline following the death of locomotive designer Curly Lawrence. Evans inaugurated the International Model Locomotive Efficiency Competition (IMLEC) in 1969. An erudite editor, Evans worked with a pool of other knowledgeable contributors during a time considered to be the height of British toolroom engineering. Evans retired from the magazine in June 1977, continuing his concentration on locomotive design. He died December 29, 2003.

== Locomotive designs ==
Many model locomotive designs in a range of gauges were serialised by Martin Evans in the pages of Model Engineer. Some of the castings used to machine and build these designs are still available from a few commercial suppliers as are some of the laser cut components. Some of the earlier designs along with discussion threads among engineers of locomotive models can be seen in various web forums on the internet. They are frequently seen both on model railway society tracks and second-hand markets.

The designs included:

=== 2½ in. gauge ===
- Black Five, 4-6-0
- Eagle, 4-4-0
- Nigel Minor, 2-8-0 GNR 01

=== 3½ in. gauge ===
- Black Five Doris, 4-6-0
- Caribou, 0-8-0
- Columbia, 4-8-4
- Conway, 0-4-0
- Euston, 2-8-0
- Evening Star, 2-10-0 (completed the design started by LBSC)
- Firefly GWR 4575 Class 2-6-2
- Greene King, 4-6-0
- Ivatt, 2-6-0
- Jubilee, 2-6-4
- Natal 4-6-2
- Rob Roy, 0-6-0
- William, 2-6-2
- The Great Marquess, 2-6-0

=== 5 in. gauge ===
- Ashford 2-6-0
- Boxhill, 0-6-0
- Enterprise, 2-6-2
- Jinty, 0-6-0
- Metro, 2-4-0
- Nigel Gresley, 2-8-0
- Royal Scot, 4-6-0
- Princess of Wales, 4-2-2
- Simplex, 0-6-0
- Super Simplex, 0-6-0
- Springbok, 4-6-0
- Stirling Single, 2-2-2
- Stratford, 0-6-0
- Superclaud, 4-4-0
- Torquay Manor, 4-6-0
- Waverley North, 4-4-2

=== 7¼ in. gauge ===
- Singapore, 0-4-0 Saddle Tank
- Dart, 0-4-2
- Greene Queen, 4-6-0
- Highlander, 4-6-0
- Holmside, 0-6-0

== Selected books ==
Martin Evans authored a number of books, including:

- Manual of model steam locomotive construction. London: Percival Marshall, 1960 (158 p). 2nd ed: 1962 (172 p). Reprint 1967.
- Atlantic era: the British Atlantic locomotive. Percival Marshall, 1961 (94 p).
- Pacific steam: the British Pacific locomotive. Percival Marshall, 1961 (80 p).
- Model locomotive valve gears. London: Percival Marshall, 1962. 2nd ed: Hemel Hempstead: Model & Allied Publications, 1967 (98 p).
- Inverness to Crewe: The British 4-6-0 locomotive. Model Aeronautical Press, 1966 (164 p).
- Outdoor Model Railways. Hemel Hempstead: Model and Allied Publications, 1970 (96 p).
- Rob Roy: how to build a simple 3 1/2 in. gauge 0-6-0 tank locomotive based on the dockyard engines of the old Caledonian Railway. Hemel Hempstead: Model and Allied Publications, 1972 (112 p). Rev ed: 1979.
- Model locomotive construction. Hemel Hempstead: Model & Allied Publications, 1974 (viii, 163 p). 2nd ed.: Watford: Model and Allied Publications, 1978 (viii, 163 p).
- Model locomotive boilers: their design and construction. Rev ed: Watford, Hertfordshire: Model & Allied Publications, 1976, (144 p).
- Caribou 0-8-0 Canadian switcher for 3 1/2in. gauge: (and "Buffalo" a 2-8-0 - a Consolidation). Watford, UK: Model & Allied Publications, Argus Books, 1977. (79 p).
- Simplex 0-6-0 freelance tank locomotive for 5in. gauge. Watford, UK: Model & Allied Publications, Argus Books, 1977. (80 p).
- Introducing model steam locomotive construction. London: K. Dickson, 1981 (114 p).
- The model steam locomotive: a complete treatise on design and construction. Hemel Hempstead, Hertfordshire: Argus Books, 1983 (208 p).
- Rob Roy and William: two 3 1/2in. gauge locomotives. London: Argus Books, c.1987 (219 p).
- Model locomotive and marine boilers. Hemel Hempstead, UK: Argus Books, 1988 (190 p).

== See also ==
- Model engineering
- Live steam
- List of scale model sizes
- Rail transport modelling scales
- Rideable miniature railway
