= Henry Greenly =

British engineer (1876–1947)

Henry Greenly (1876–1947) was amongst the foremost miniature railway engineers of the 20th century, remembered as a master of engineering design.

== Miniature railways ==
Greenly is perhaps best remembered for his miniature locomotive designs. He worked closely with many engineering companies, including Bassett-Lowke and its various engineering subsidiary companies. In 1909, along with Wenman Joseph Bassett-Lowke, Henry Greenly started and edited Model Railways and Locomotives Magazine.

He worked with Captain J E P Howey on the designs for the world-famous Romney, Hythe and Dymchurch Railway in Kent, England, and served as that railway's Chief Engineer. He was also involved with innovative locomotive design work at the nearby Saltwood Miniature Railway.

== Greenly Engineering Models ==
Greenly established his own miniature railway engineering company Greenly Engineering Models in Hounslow, Middlesex, and his renowned engineering design skills were well matched with the practical engineering skills of his workshop engineering manager Jock Campbell.

== Legacy ==
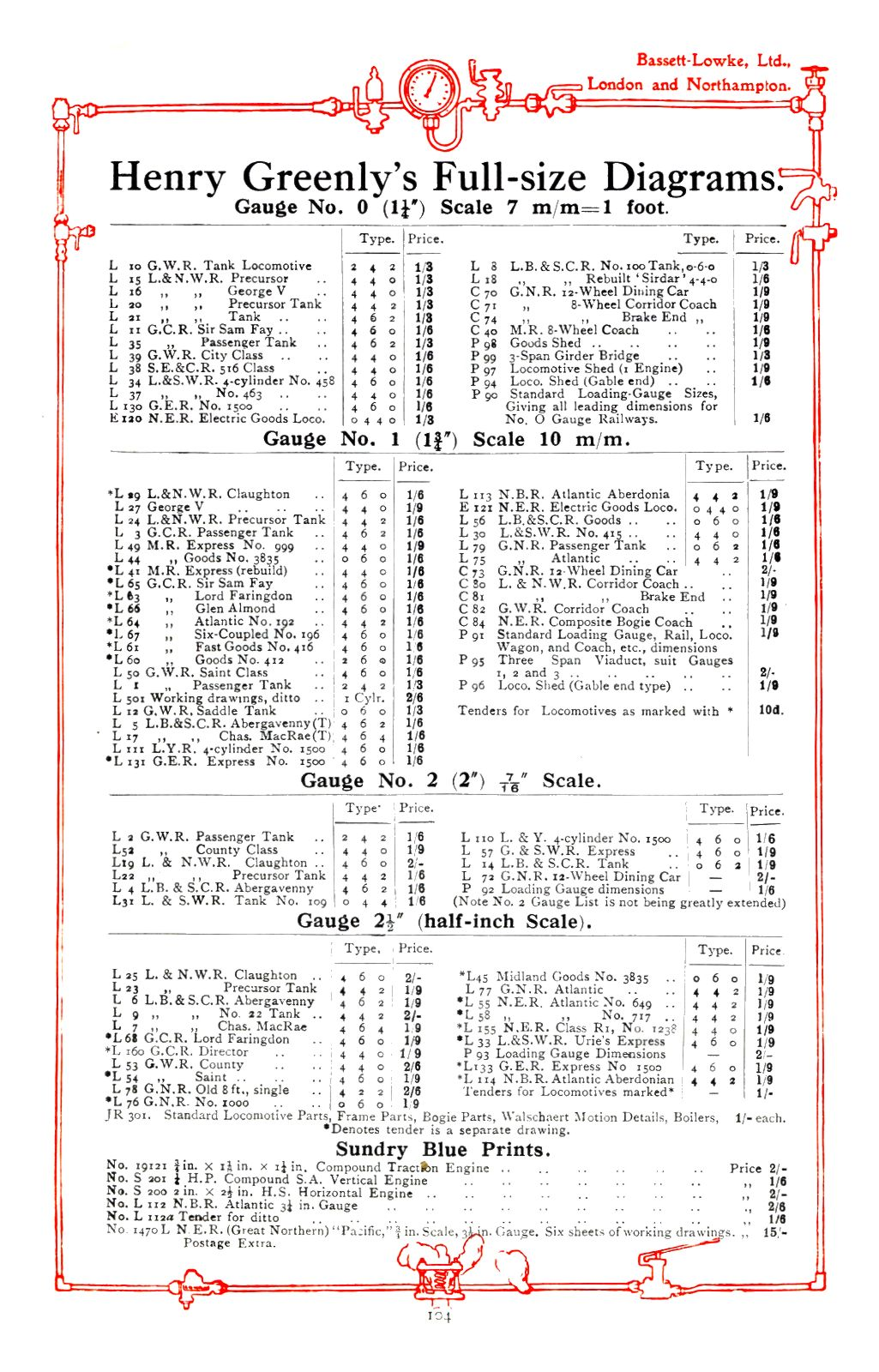
Henry Greenly's 1:1 blueprint diagrams for 0 to 2½ gauge, a page from the 1924 Bassett-Lowke Catalogue B

Greenly's designs have been celebrated in countless periodicals and books, but the greatest testimony to his skill is the enormous number of his locomotives that are still operating today.

=== 1¾ inch gauge ===
- GWR 3600 Class 2-4-2T, tank engine, single inside cylinder, Slide valves
- LMS Midland compound style 4-4-0 tender engine, two outside cylinders, valve chests between the frames, slip eccentric valve gear
- SR Schools Class 4-4-0 tender engine, two outside cylinders, piston-style slide valves, Greenly-Joy or Walschaerts valve gear
- LMS Royal Scot Class 4-6-0 tender engine, three cylinders, piston-style slide valves, Walschaerts valve gear
- American style 4-6-2 Pacific tender engine, two outside cylinders, Baker valve gear, slide valves
- Express 4-4-4T tank engine, two outside cylinders, piston-style slide valves, Greenly valve gear
- LNER style 4-6-2 Pacific tender engine, two outside cylinders, piston-style slide valves, Walschaerts valve gear

=== 2½ inch gauge ===
- SR Lord Nelson class 4-6-0 tender engine, originally designed by Richard Maunsell, two outside cylinders, piston or slide valves, Walschaerts valve gear
- North British Railway S class (later LNER J37 class) 0-6-0 freight tender engine designed by William Reid, two inside cylinders, slide valves, indirect link motion with rocker arm valve gear.
- BR class 4 2-6-4T tank engine, two outside cylinders, piston or slide valves, Walschaerts valve gear

=== 3½ inch gauge ===
- Caledonian Railway 113 class 4-4-0 tender engine No. 114, designed by William Pickersgill, two inside cylinders, slide valves, Stephenson's valve gear

=== 5-inch gauge ===
- SR King Arthur class 4-6-0 tender engine, two outside cylinders, piston valves, Walschaerts valve gear
- War Department Austerity 2-8-0 tender engine, two outside cylinders, piston valves, Walschaerts valve gear

=== 7¼ inch gauge ===
- Maid of Kent, GWR-style 2-6-0 mogul designed by Greenly, based on a design concept by Alexander Schwab. Still in service, but rebuilt as a SR U class.
- GWR King class 4-6-0 tender engine, four cylinders, piston valves, twin inside Walschaerts valve gear.
- Risborough 4-6-4T tank engine freelance design with two outside cylinders, piston valves, outside Walschaerts valve gear.
- Stantor 2-6-2 tender engine, freelance narrow gauge design with two outside cylinders, slide valves, outside Joy valve gear.

=== 15-inch gauge ===
- Little Giant class Atlantic 4-4-2 with two outside cylinders, slide valves, inside Stephenson's valve gear, ¼ scale or 3 inches to the foot, first built in 1904, over time a total of 9 were built all by Bassett-Lowke
- Sans Pareil class Atlantic 4-4-2 with two outside cylinders, slide valves, inside Stephenson's valve gear, scale; 3¼ inches to the foot, first built in 1911, over time a total of 3 were built all by Bassett-Lowke
- Colossus type Pacific 4-6-2 design akin to the original '’Colossus'’ designed for Howey which later passed to the Ravenglass and Eskdale Railway with two outside cylinders, piston valves, outside Walschaerts valve gear, scale; 3¼ inches to the foot
- River Esk 2-8-2 tender engine in 1923, Ravenglass and Eskdale Railway, 2 outside cylinder Lentz poppet valve gear, converted to Walschaerts valve gear in 1927, built by Davey-Paxman & Co Colchester
- Green Goddess, Northern Chief, and Southern Maid all Great Northern/LNER style Pacific 4-6-2 tender engines built for the Romney, Hythe and Dymchurch Railway in 1925 at ⅓ scale or 4 inches to the foot by Davey-Paxman & Co. Two cylinders, piston valves, and Walschaerts valve gear.
- Hercules and Samson both freelance design but LNER style Mountain 4-8-2 tender engines built for the Romney, Hythe and Dymchurch Railway in 1925 at ⅓ scale or 4 inches to the foot by Davey-Paxman & Co. Two cylinders, piston valves, and Walschaerts valve gear.
- Typhoon and Hurricane both Great Northern/LNER style Pacific 4-6-2 tender engines built for the Romney, Hythe and Dymchurch Railway in 1927 at ⅓ scale or 4 inches to the foot by Davey-Paxman & Co. Three cylinders (later converted to two), piston valves, and Walschaerts valve gear.

== Published books ==
- Greenly (1904). The Model Locomotive. Percival Marshall & Co.
- Greenly (1906). Model Electric Locomotives. Percival Marshall & Co.
- Greenly (1906). Model Steam Engines. Percival Marshall & Co.
- Greenly; Marshall (1907). Flying Machines, Past Present and Future. Percival Marshall & Co.
- Greenly; Bassett-Lowke (1910). Model Railway Handbook. Bassett-Lowke Ltd.
- Greenly (2010) [1915]. Model Engineering, a Guide to Model Workshop Practice. Cassell & Co. Ltd. ISBN 9781603863124.
- Greenly; Steel (1953) [1921]. Model Railways, Their Design, Details and Practical Construction. Cassell & Co. Ltd.
- Greenly (2005) [1922]. Model Steam Locomotives. Camden Miniature Steam Services. ISBN 0-9547131-2-5.
- Greenly (1935) [1922]. Model Electric Locomotives and Railways, Their Details and Practical Construction. Cassell & Co. Ltd.
- Greenly (1923). Ravenglass & Eskdale Railway (Guide). Ravenglass & Eskdale Railway Ltd.
- Greenly (1930). Model Steam Locomotive Construction. Cassell & Co. Ltd.
- Greenly (1931). Model Electric Railway Construction. Cassell & Co. Ltd.
- Greenly (1935) [1931]. Model Railway Construction. Cassell & Co. Ltd.
- Greenly (1933). Locomotive Engineering (Series). Geo. Newnes Ltd.
- Greenly (1933). The Vacuum Brake (Series). Geo. Newnes Ltd.
- Greenly; Steel (1977) [1935]. Walschaerts' Valve Gear. Model & Allied Publications/ Argus Books. ISBN 0853441081.
- Greenly (1935). Signals and Signalling. Percival Marshall & Co.
- Greenly (1936). Planning and Layout. Percival Marshall & Co.
- Greenly (1955) [1937]. Permanent Way Manual. Trix Ltd.
- Greenly; Ernest Steel (2011) [1952]. Greenly's Model Steam Locomotive Designs and Specifications. Camden Miniature Steam Services. ISBN 978-0-9564073-8-2.

== See also ==
- Curly Lawrence
