= Model Engineers' Workshop =

- Editor: Neil Wyatt
- Former editors: David Clark (model engineer)
- Frequency: Monthly
- Format: A4
- Publisher: Mortons Media Group
- Founder: Stan Bray
- Founded: 1996
- Country: United Kingdom
- Language: English

Model Engineers' Workshop is a UK hobby magazine published by Mortons Media Group that was spun off Model Engineer in 1990. The magazine focuses on metal working workshop tools and techniques, although in recent years it has given more space to modern technologies such as CAD/CAM and 3D printing.
