= Model Engineer =

British hobby magazine, founded 1898

- Cover for issue 4398, dated 25 February 2011
- Editor: Martin R Evans
- Categories: Hobby magazines
- Frequency: Bi-weekly
- Publisher: Mortons Media Group
- Founded: 1898
- Country: United Kingdom
- Based in: Horncastle, Lincolnshire
- Language: English
- Website: model-engineer.co.uk
- ISSN: 0026-7325

Model Engineer is a British hobby magazine dedicated to model engineering. It was first published in 1898 by Percival Marshall, who was to remain its editor for over 50 years. It has been owned by Mortons Media Group since 2022. The magazine addressed the emergence of a new hobby — the construction of models (often working) and experimental engineering, largely in metal. It transcended class barriers, appealing to professional engineers, jobbing machinists and anyone interested in making working mechanisms.

== Contributors ==
The magazine has had many notable contributors, but foremost among these was LBSC (pen name of Lillian 'Curly' Lawrence). From the inter-war period to the 1960s he produced many designs for simple but reliable small model steam locomotives. Most of these were published in Model Engineer, and brought the construction of small passenger hauling locomotives within the reach of the typical home machinist. Other notable contributors include Henry Greenly, Edgar T. Westbury, J. N. Maskelyne and one of the most notable editors, Martin Evans.

== Model Engineer Exhibition ==
Model Engineer had a long-standing association with the Model Engineer Exhibition, originally held at Olympia in London. The exhibition was almost as venerable an institution as the magazine itself, and was notable for the display of some of the finest examples of the hobby.

== Magazine content ==
The subject matter of the (now fortnightly, earlier weekly) magazine ranges from articles about techniques and tools to profiles of full-size prototypes of modelling subjects. The main content is, however, 'constructional articles' describing projects at various levels of detail. Such articles range from single pages to long-running series in successive or alternate issues, some of which can last for many months, if not years. These more detailed series generally appeal to a wider audience than those engaged in the project. It is often as much in the (often loosely) related anecdotes alongside as in the processes described.

== Model Engineer today ==
Over the years the magazine has waxed and waned, but is currently enjoying the increased popularity of the hobby engendered by the availability of comparatively cheap machine tools from China and Taiwan. In 1990 it spun off a companion title Model Engineers' Workshop which enjoys similar success but focuses more on workshop techniques and tooling.

== See also ==
- Bassett-Lowke
- Live steam
- Ridable miniature railway
- Model engineering
