= Bassett-Lowke =

British model & toy manufacturer

- Founded: c. 1899
- Founder: Wenman Joseph Bassett-Lowke
- Defunct: 1965; 61 years ago
- Fate: After the company closed, rights to brand acquired by Corgi in 1965, becoming a brand
- Headquarters: Northampton, England
- Products: Model railways
- Owner: Hornby (2008–pres.)
- Website: bassettlowke.co.uk

Bassett-Lowke was an English toy manufacturing company based in Northampton. Founded by Wenman Joseph Bassett-Lowke in 1898 or 1899, the company specialized in model railways, boats and ships, and construction sets. Bassett-Lowke started as a mail-order business, although it designed and manufactured some items.

As a sales organization, Bassett-Lowke contracted manufacturers such as Twining Models and Winteringham Ltd, also of Northampton. Until the First World War, the company also carried models made by the German companies Bing and Märklin.

The company closed in 1965, with its rights to brand acquired by Corgi Toys. When Corgi was taken over by Hornby in 2008, it secured rights to the Bassett-Lowke brand, which is still commercialising.

== Miniature locomotives ==
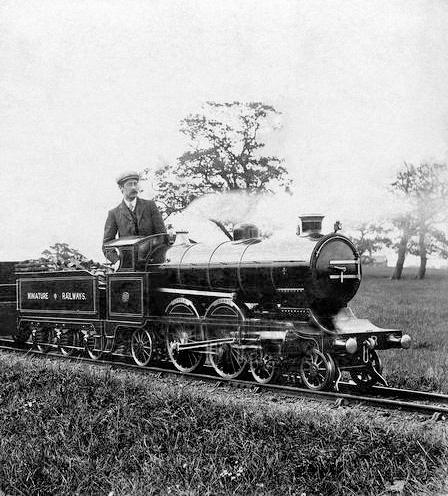
15-inch (381 mm) gauge locomotive Little Giant

Bassett-Lowke produced trains from 15-inch (381 mm) gauge live steam models to Gauge 2, Gauge 1 and 0 gauge trains.

The first 15-inch steam locomotive, test run on the Eaton Hall Railway in 1905, was Little Giant. Unlike other engines on the line, it was a replica of main-line locos, built for a public miniature railway at Blackpool. It was a quarter-scale 4-4-2 "Atlantic" tender engine, though not an exact copy of any particular prototype. That engine still exists in private ownership.

In 1914, Bassett-Lowke produced the second "Pacific" 4-6-2 of any size built in Britain (the first was GWR 111 The Great Bear). That was John Anthony, built for a miniature railway at Staughton Manor, Cambridgeshire. It was never delivered, but after storage at Eaton Hall, Cheshire during the First World War, was sold to the Ravenglass and Eskdale Railway and renamed Colossus. It was scrapped in 1927. Ravenglass and Eskdale had purchased another Bassett-Lowke Atlantic, the Sans Pareil.

Outline details of the individual large-scale miniature locomotives built at Northampton are given in the "Locomotive histories" section below.

In 1909, along with Henry Greenly, W. J. Bassett-Lowke started and edited Model Railways and Locomotives Magazine.

== Model trains ==
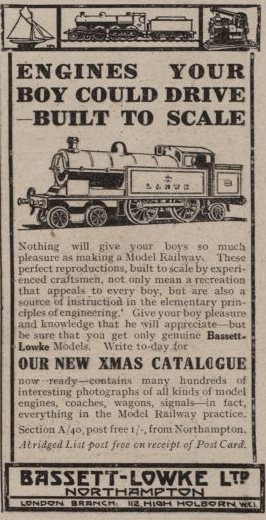
Advert from the 28 December 1923 edition of The Radio Times

In the 1920s, Bassett-Lowke introduced 00 gauge products. The company provided custom-built railways, and one such gauge 1 layout survives in modified format at Bekonscot Model Village in England.

In 1939, Bassett-Lowke was tasked with producing a working model of Churchill's trench-digging tank known as Cultivator No. 6.

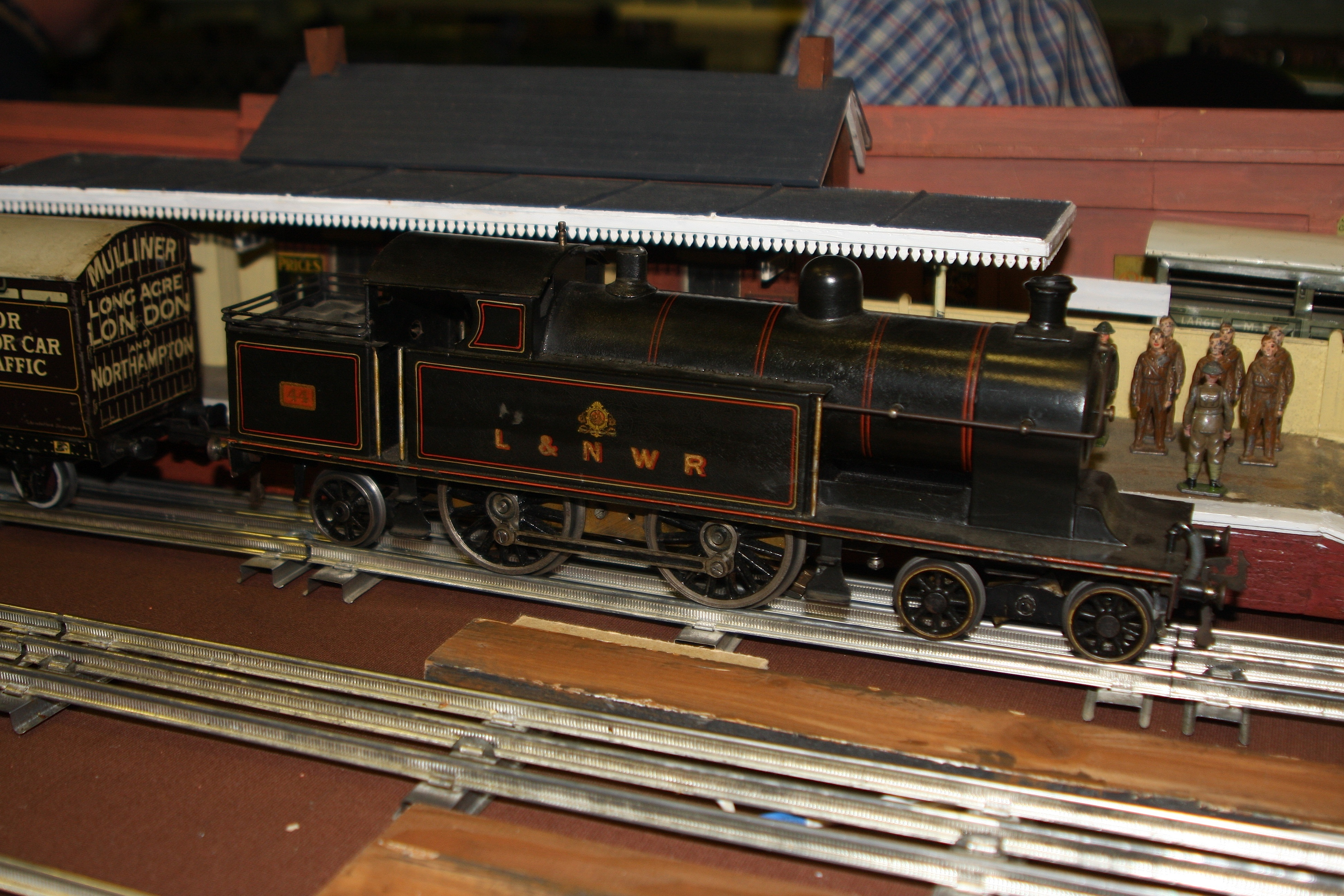
Tinplate electric locomotive

Bassett-Lowke's decline, starting in the late 1950s, can be blamed on at least two factors: people would browse the firm's free catalogue and buy similar or nearly identical items elsewhere at lower price; and the interest in technical toys declined in the late 1950s and even more in the 1960s. Bassett-Lowke's fall was mirrored by its U.S. counterparts, the A. C. Gilbert Company and Lionel Corporation. In 1964, the company ceased retail sales and sold its shops, including one at High Holborn in London, to Beatties. Bassett-Lowke went out of business in 1965.

In 1966, the company was acquired by Messrs Riley and Derry. Around 1969, Ivan Rutherford Scott, Allen L. Levy and Roland H. Fuller apparently made an effort to revive the model railway business. In the late 1980s, Nigel Turner, a Northampton businessman, bought the business and based it next to his business, Turner's Musical Merry-Go-Round, near Wootton, Northamptonshire. In 1993, the name was revived with short-run white-metal models. These included a Burrell-type traction engine, Clayton undertype steam wagon, Burrell-type steam roller, and a London B-type bus. The name was acquired in 1996 by Corgi, which linked it with live steam 0-gauge locomotives.

Key competitors to Bassett-Lowke were Hornby and Exley. Hornby acquired Corgi in 2008 and originally continued to make the 0 gauge models before later discontinuing them. The brand name was revived by them in 2020 for a range of 00 scale steampunk models based on existing Hornby toolings.

== Hornby ==
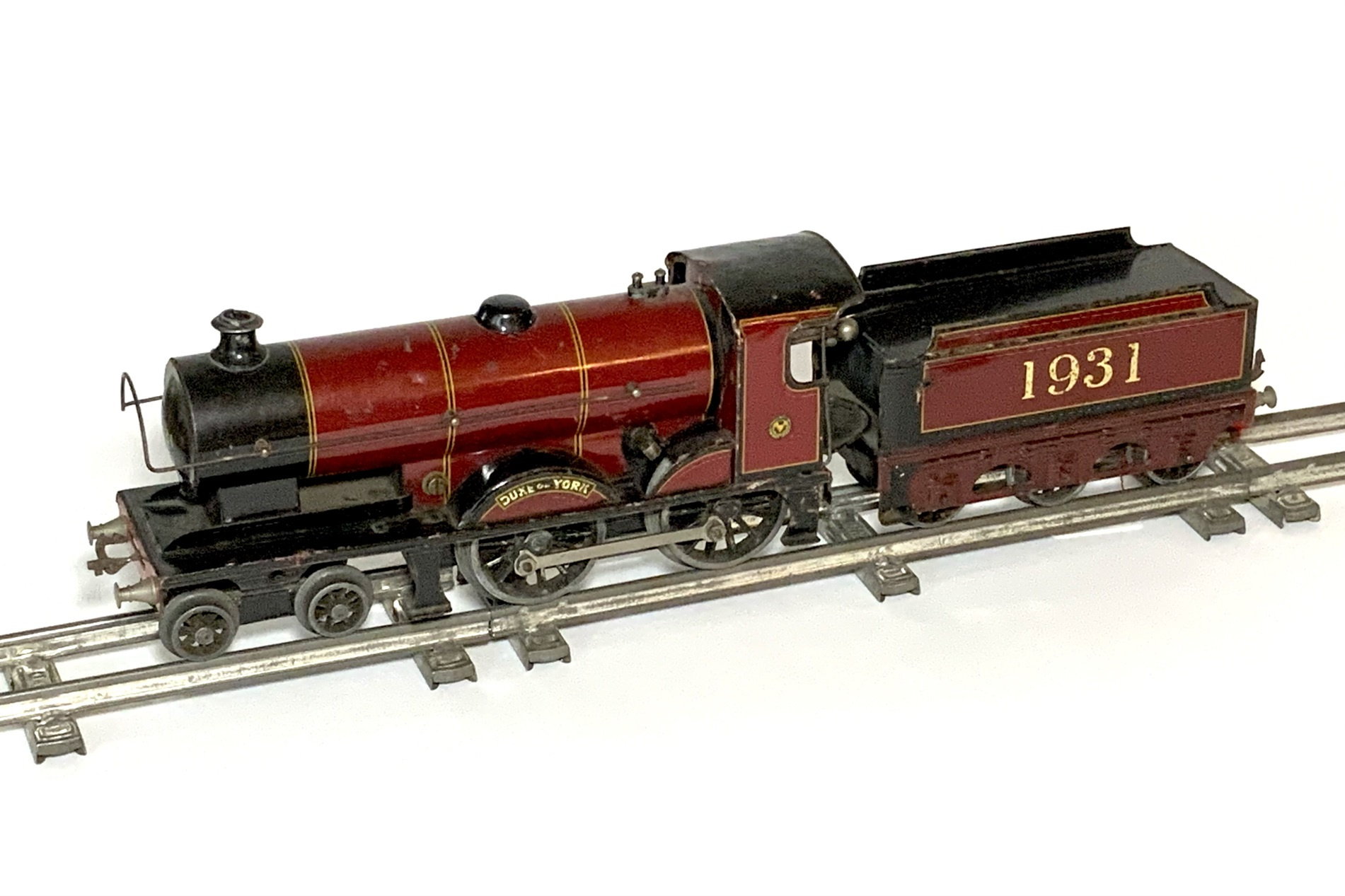
Tinplate 0 gauge clockwork locomotive Duke of York, 2023

The Bassett-Lowke name was purchased by Corgi after the company dissolved in 1965, who used it for Corgi Classics. Corgi (and the Bassett-Lowke brand) was bought by Hornby in 2008 who used it for traditional sheet metal railway models. In 2020 Bassett-Lowke branding was used by Hornby to launch a range of steampunk-inspired railway models. In 2021 brick-based construction models with steampunk themes were released under the Bassett-Lowke branding as the 'brickpunk' range aimed at both children and adults.

== Narrow Gauge Railways Ltd ==
In 1912 W. J. Bassett-Lowke, Robert Proctor-Mitchell and John Wills set up Narrow Gauge Railways Ltd (NGR) to promote and run 15-inch (380 mm) railways. An earlier company, Miniature Railways of Great Britain Ltd, went into voluntary liquidation in 1912. NGR's first railway opened in 1912 at Luna Park in the Parc des Eaux Vives, Geneva, Switzerland. In Britain, the Ravenglass and Eskdale Railway was taken over, converted to 15-inch (380 mm) gauge and re-opened in 1915. The Fairbourne Railway in Wales followed in 1916.

== Waterline ship models ==
The name Bassett-Lowke is mostly associated with model trains but the company also had a long history of contracting skilled craftsmen to make 100 ft. to 1 inch or 1/1200 scale military and civilian waterline ship models out of wood and wire. These detailed hand crafted waterline ship models are so highly desired by ship model collectors that they often command higher prices than the Bassett-Lowke model trains. Something that is not well known is that Bassett-Lowke also sold less detailed waterline models cast in white metal.

Roland Fuller on page 49 of his book, "The Bassett-Lowke Story", states that in the London Bassett-Lowke store on High Holborn St. there was such a demand for the hand-made waterline 100 ft. to 1 inch scale wooden ship models that the company had to make available to its customers a less expensive line of waterline ship models, cast in white metal, to meet the demand. The name of the casting company supplying these inexpensive white metal ship models for Bassett-Lowke customers was Brighton Manufacturing Company, a company using the initials B.M.C. to identify their products. The B.M.C. Company was located at 32 Great St Helens, London, England. This metal casting company was a neighbor to Bassett-Lowke, its store being within walking distance from the Bassett-Lowke shop located on High Holborn St.

Roland Fuller describes in extensive detail the range of inexpensive metal ships offered to Bassett-Lowke customers. He states the metal ship models could be purchased individually or could be purchased in numbered boxed sets.

Illustrations of these same metal waterline ship models appear in a book by Derek Head. On pages 11 and 15 In his book "Bassett-Lowke Waterline Ship Models", Mr. Head provides excerpts of a few pages of the Bassett-Lowke war time catalog. These excerpted catalog pages contain illustrations of metal ship models sold in numbered boxed sets matching the exact description of the numbered boxed sets of metal ship models described in the Roland Fuller book. The presence of these metal ship models in the Bassett-Lowke war time model ship catalog can be explained by the following:

Derek Head describes on page 11 of his book that at beginning of the First World War, government censors prohibited Bassett-Lowke from selling or advertising their line of detailed 100 ft. to 1 inch or 1/1200 scale models of the Royal Navy. The concern of the censors was that the accuracy of these detailed models could give vital information to the enemy.

In order to have some representation of the Royal Navy for their war time catalog, Bassett-Lowke replaced their prohibited Royal Navy models by purchasing the less detailed metal ship models of the Royal Navy made by the neighboring company, B.M.C. These metal B.M.C. models while detailed, had their origins as game models and were therefore less accurate depictions of Royal Navy Warships. This lack of sharp detail was apparently found acceptable to the government censors and therefore they were allowed to appear in the catalog.

The resulting model fleet in metal carried in the Bassett-Lowke war time catalogue was of every class of ship in the British navy then in commission as of 1914. The models found in the collection range from the early 1889 Royal Sovereign class Pre-Dreadnoughts, some of which had been retained by the navy as bombardment ships, through to eventually the newest Revenge class Super-Dreadnoughts which had just come into service. The 1917 Bassett-Lowke catalogue proudly boasts that "Practically every ship in the Navy has been modelled, including Super-Dreadnoughts, Battleships, Battle Cruisers, Armoured Cruisers, Light Cruisers, Destroyers, Torpedo Boats, Submarines, Mine Layers, Mine Sweepers, Troopships, Transports, Armed Liners and all Auxiliary Craft". The models were formed in lead with the wire masts cast into the hulls in a scale of one inch to 150 feet or 1/1800. They were painted and issued in numbered boxed sets by Bassett-Lowke, the boxes bearing the label “H.M.S. Irresistible”. Paper flags were supplied with each set, to be cut out and applied to the masts and sternposts.

Every class of vessel was easily recognizable by the funnels, guns and masts. While rudimentary by later standards, the B.M.C. production of over 101 different castings was the first scale metal ship model fleet ever produced and established the precedent for all subsequent scale metal waterline recognition ship models. In addition to the ship models, B.M.C. produced a fort with movable guns, four lighthouses and a game featuring a large fold-out map of the Dardanelles channel showing forts and minefields. The game was supplied with fifteen metal ship models including two mine sweepers and two submarines

This collaboration between Bassett-Lowke and B.M.C. was a great benefit to both companies. It allowed Bassett-Lowke to have a representation of the Royal Navy in their war time catalogue that was acceptable to the government censors and at the same time it gave the small metal casting company of B.M.C. a broader venue for the sales of their metal ship models. In the time period of the First World War, these metal B.M.C. ship models were the only examples of waterline warship models of the Royal Navy sold by Bassett-Lowke and are therefore deserving of a more detailed review than has normally been accorded to them.

The B.M.C. waterline ship models had been cast by an independent company which had been selling their metal waterline ship models for over 10 years through advertisement and through shops specializing in military miniatures. Early in the century this small company had begun supplying lead waterline game models to the publishers of the Fred T. Janes Naval War Game, supplementing the pressed cork and wire waterline game models already being supplied to the game by others. The accomplishment of B.M.C. is that this garage sized company had, by 1903 begun the creation of the first commercially available metal waterline ship models made in a uniform scale to each other.

=== B.M.C. ship models available today ===
The B.M.C. ship models often appear for sale on internet auctions and at toy shows. Many times at these sales the B.M.C. models are found mixed with copies made by two later companies. The B.M.C. models can be distinguished from the copies since only the B.M.C. models have full-length wire masts cast into the hulls. The first type of copies are 31 models made by Minifigs. These are cast in solid lead, have no wire masts and have large numbers inscribed on the bottom. The second type of copies comprise a group of four models made by Crescent which are cast in pot metal. They have numbers near the starboard stern numbering B.1, B.2, B.3, or B.4. Curiously, these pot-metal models retain the same numbering system that is cast into the hulls of the four B.M.C models from which they were derived. These Crescent copies mimic the B.M.C. castings of the B.I Duncan, B.II Swiftsure, B.III King Edward VII, and the B.IV Lord Nelson. It is unknown when Bassett-Lowke ceased carrying the B.M.C metal ship models, however Derek Head in his book on page 12, states that metal ship models continued to be carried until the 1920’s.

In the present day, the larger highly accurate wood and wire ship models in the scale of one inch to 1200 inches or 1:1200, were auctioned for high prices. These ship models which were hand crafted continued to be sold commercially until the mid1960's and had also been purchased by the military for their purpose of war gaming and display. Unlike the B.M.C. metal models, which were carried only briefly by Bassett-Lowke in the early years, the larger highly finished 100 to 1 inch or 1/1200 scale wooden ship models are sought by collectors and were auctioned for high prices. The Derek Head book, "Bassett-Lowke Waterline Ship Models" will reward ship model collectors with a survey of both the metal B.M.C. ships and the expensive, detailed, hand-crafted ship models, many from his own collection.

== Locomotive histories ==
Bassett-Lowke locomotives were often renamed when moved to different railways, sometimes creating uncertainty about whether a locomotive is new or an old one with a new name. The list (probably incomplete) is not definitive. Most of Bassett-Lowke's locomotives were designed by Henry Greenly who was a contributor to Model Engineer magazine.

=== Class 10 Atlantic ===
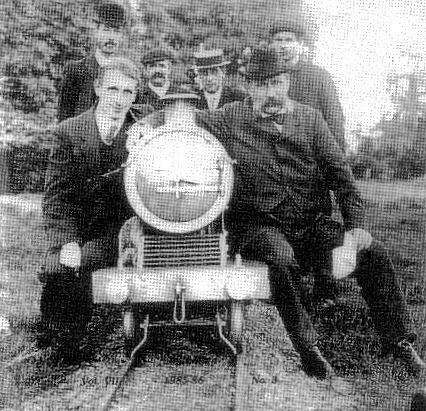
Blakesley Miniature Railway - Blacolvesley locomotive

- Little Giant (10) for Blackpool later renamed and numbered to Baby Bunce (14)
- Mighty Atom (11) for Sutton Miniature Railway was later renamed Ville De Nancy (13)
- Entente Cordiale (12) for the 1909 Exposition Internationale de l'Est de France in Nancy only loco which has an unknown fate.
- Red Dragon (15) for the Imperial International Exhibition of 1909 at White City, London, to Rhyl 1911 renamed Prince Edward Of Wales, Margate 1928, Butterell & Milner in the USA 1968
- Green Dragon (16) for the Imperial International Exhibition of 1909 at White City, London renamed George the Fifth (18) later sold to the Lakeside Miniature Railway, to Rhyl in 1913, Skegness 1922, Southend 1930, Belle Vue 1938, then Steamtown Carnforth 19?? and currently in private ownership in USA
- King Edward for the 1910 International and Universal Exhibition in Brussels, Belgium
- King Albert for the 1910 International and Universal Exhibition in Brussels, Belgium
- King Leopold for the 1910 International and Universal Exhibition in Brussels, Belgium
- Hungaria (No. 19) built in 1912 originally for Luna Park Geneva, Switzerland, then taken to Vidámpark (Amusement Park), Budapest, Hungary in 1914. Boiler changed in 1952, withdrawn in 1974, taken to a scrapyard but saved by the Transport Museum. Currently displayed in Zánkafürdő Railway Station, Hungary.

=== Class 20 Atlantic ===
- Unnamed built 1912 for King Rama VI of Siam, Bangkok
- Prince Edward of Wales (21) built 1912 for Southport, to Fairbourne Railway 1916, rebuilt in 1931 after a fire, sold 1969
- Prince of Wales (22) built 1915 for Fairbourne Railway, Southport 1923, rebuilt in 1931 after a fire, sold 1969

=== Class 30 Atlantic ===
- Synolda (30) built 1912 for Sir Robert Walker Sand Hutton Miniature Railway, then to Southend-on-Sea by 1930, Bishop Auckland 1938, Belle Vue, Manchester 1942 renamed "Prince Charles" and Ravenglass and Eskdale Railway in 1978
- Prins Olaf (31) built 1912 for the Geneva exhibition, Oslo Exhibtion 1914, to Ravenglass and Eskdale Railway 1915 renamed San Pariel, scrapped 1927, parts used in other locomotives
- Count Louis (32) built 1923 for Count Louis Zborowski, then to Fairbourne Railway 1925 after Zborowski's death, and to Evesham Vale Light Railway 1987. Occasionally visits other 15in railways around the UK.

=== Class 60 Pacific ===
- John Anthony (60) built 1914 for J. E. P. Howey, Staughton Manor, and Eaton Hall for a short time, to Ravenglass and Eskdale Railway 1916 renamed Colossus, scrapped 1927, chassis used in the first River Mite with the chassis of Sir Aubrey Brocklebank, scrapped 1938

The Class 10 and Class 20 had narrow fireboxes. The Class 30 and Class 60 had wide fireboxes.

== Literature ==
- Model Railway and Engineering Catalogue. Bassett-Lowke Ltd., Northampton 1961, Online viewable in Internet-Archiv

== See also ==
- Model Engineer magazine
- Minimum-gauge railway
- Ridable miniature railway
- Romney, Hythe and Dymchurch Railway
- Live steam
