= GWR 1366 Class =

British 0-6-0PT steam locomotive

GWR 1366 class
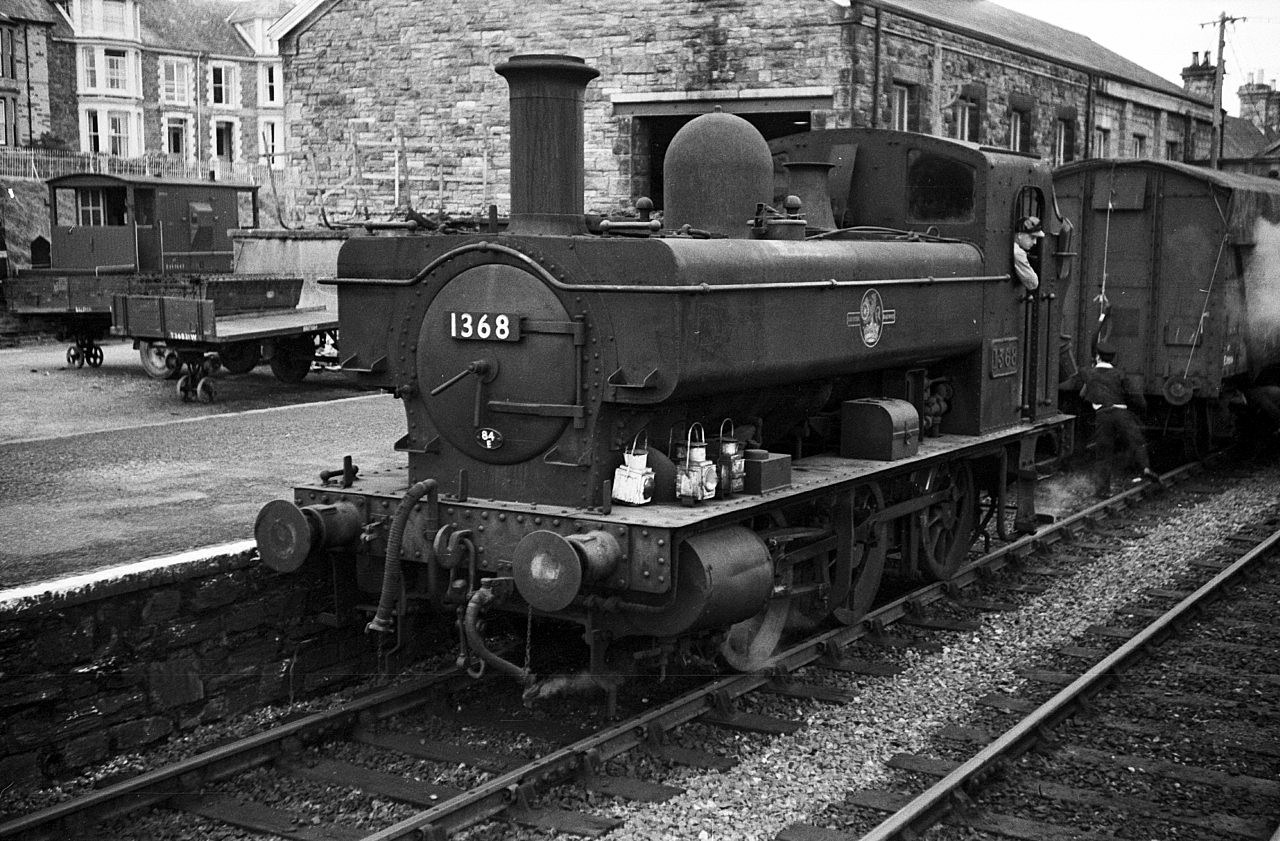
- 1368 at Wadebridge in 1964
Type and origin
- Power type: Steam
- Designer: Charles Collett
- Builder: GWR Swindon Works
- Order number: Lot 286
- Build date: February 1934
- Total produced: 6
Specifications
- Configuration
  - Whyte: 0-6-0PT
  - UIC: C n2t
- Gauge: 4 ft 8 1/2 in (1,435 mm) standard gauge
- Driver dia.: 3 ft 8 in (1.118 m)
- Wheelbase: 11 ft 0 in (3.353 m)
- Length: 26 ft 2 1/4 in (7.982 m) over buffers
- Width: 8 ft 6 in (2.591 m)
- Height: 11 ft 11 5/8 in (3.648 m)
- Axle load: 13 long tons 0 cwt (14.6 short tons; 13.2 t) full
- Loco weight: 35 long tons 15 cwt (40.0 short tons; 36.3 t) full
- Fuel type: Coal
- Fuel capacity: 2 long tons 3 cwt (2.4 short tons; 2.2 t)
- Water cap.: 830 imp gal (3,800 L; 1,000 US gal)
- Firebox
  - Grate area: 10.7 sq ft (0.99 m^{2})
- Boiler: GWR 1392
- Boiler pressure: 165 psi (1.14 MPa)
- Heating surface
  - Firebox: 73 sq ft (6.8 m^{2})
  - Tubes: 715 sq ft (66.4 m^{2})
- Superheater: None
- Cylinders: Two, outside
- Cylinder size: 16 in × 20 in (406 mm × 508 mm)
- Valve gear: Allan
- Valve type: Slide valves
Performance figures
- Tractive effort: 16,320 lbf (72.6 kN)
Career
- Operators: GWR » BR
- Class: 1366
- Power class: GWR: Unclassified, BR: 1F
- Numbers: 1366–1371
- Axle load class: GWR: Unclassified
- Withdrawn: 1960–1964
- Preserved: No. 1369
- Disposition: One preserved, remainder scrapped

The Great Western Railway (GWR) 1366 Class is a class of 0-6-0 pannier tank steam locomotives built in 1934. They were a useful design because of their light weight and short wheelbase and were often used on dockside branches or other lines with sharp curvatures.

== History and development ==
The 1366 class was one of only two pannier tank designs built by the GWR that utilised outside cylinders (alongside the GWR 1500), although various existing engines inherited by the GWR had pannier tanks and outside cylinders. The 1366 class was developed from the 1361 Class but differed by including a pannier tank rather than a saddle tank, Belpaire firebox, etc. They were designed to replace the 1392 Class.

== Operational history ==
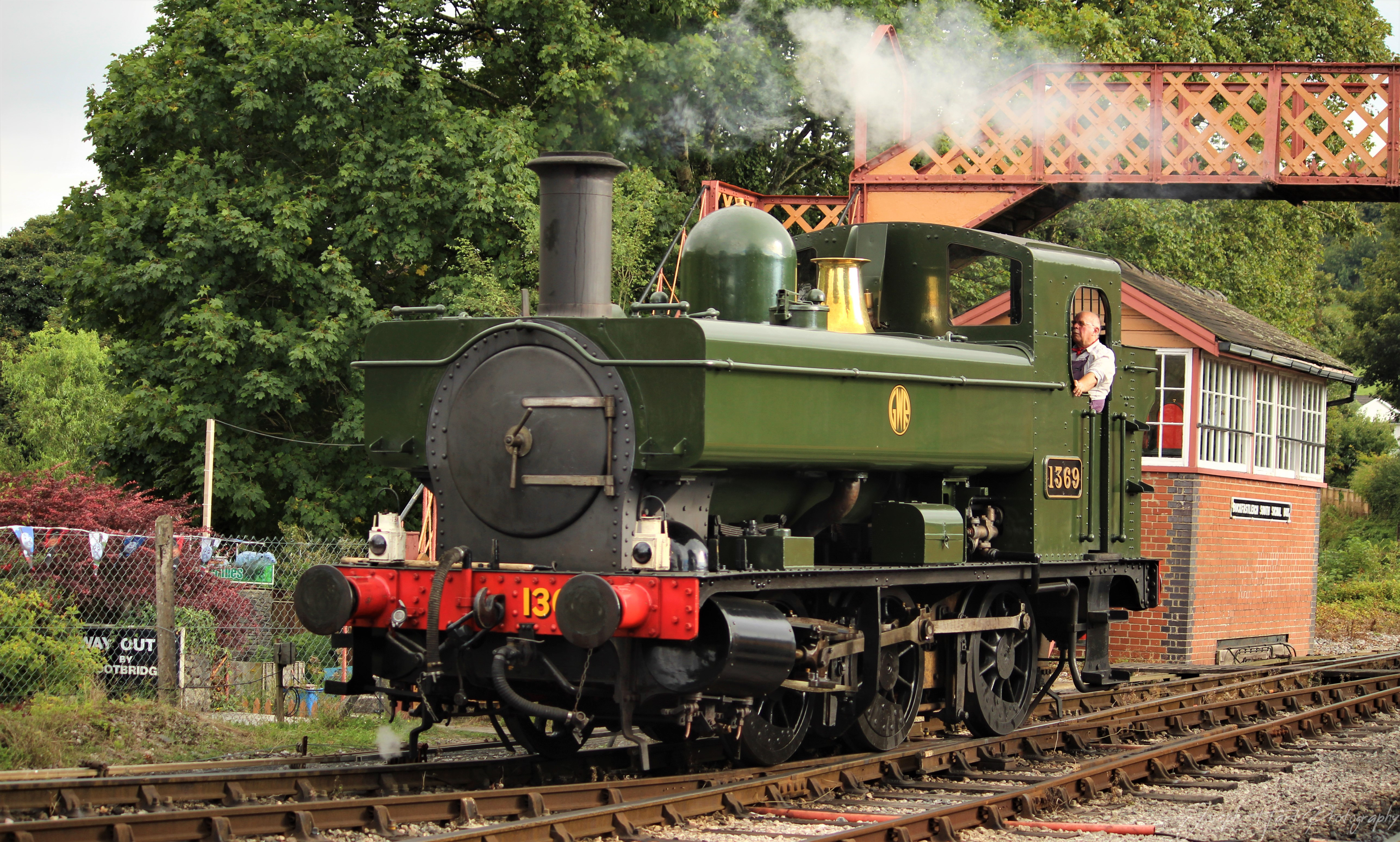
The preserved 1369, seen at Buckfastleigh on the South Devon Railway in 2021.

Originally, five of the six locomotives of the class were allocated to Swindon shed; No. 1371 was originally sent to Llanelly [sic] but when they were taken over by British Railways Western Region in 1948 three of the six had been reallocated to Weymouth for use on the docks there.

In 1950 the situation remained as it had in 1948 while by 1955 one of the locomotives had moved shed allocation from Swindon to Taunton (although used at Bridgwater) with three remaining at Weymouth and this in turn continued until 1959. With the move from steam to diesel the first of the class to be withdrawn was 1370 which was withdrawn from Weymouth shed in January 1960. It was followed by 1371 from Swindon shed in November of that year and then 1366 from Taunton the following February.

However, the three remaining locomotives were offered a new lease of life. No. 1369 was sent via Yeovil to Wadebridge and after successful clearance trials had taken place numbers 1367 and 1368 followed, the locomotives being used to replace the Beattie Well Tanks that had run over the Bodmin and Wadebridge Railway to Wenford bridge for the previous 87 years. However, dieselisation caught up with them again, and all three were withdrawn in 1964 having operated for just 2 years in Cornwall. The final locomotive, 1369, left Wadebridge under its own steam for the Dart Valley Railway on 20 February being the last operational British Railways steam locomotive to be based in Cornwall.

== Withdrawal ==
Table of withdrawals
Year	Quantity in service at start of year	Number withdrawn	Locomotive numbers
1960	6	2	1370-1371
1961	4	1	1366
1962-1963	3	0	
1964	3	3	1367-1369

== Preservation ==
One example, No. 1369, survives on the South Devon Railway.

== See also ==
- GWR 0-6-0PT – list of classes of GWR 0-6-0 pannier tank, including table of preserved locomotives

== Bibliography ==
- Allan, Ian (1950). ABC of British Railway Locomotives - Western Region. Hersham: Ian Allan. reprinted in facsimile edition, ISBN 978-0-7110-3106-7
- Fox, Peter; Hall, Peter (1993). Preserved Locomotives of British Railways. Platform 5 Publishing. ISBN 1-872524-54-0.
- le Fleming, H. M. (April 1958). White, D. E. (ed.). The Locomotives of the Great Western Railway, part five: Six-coupled Tank Engines. RCTS. ISBN 0-901115-35-5. OCLC 500544510.
- Whitehurst, Brian (1973). Great Western Engines, Names, Numbers, Types and Classes (1940 to Preservation). Oxford, UK: Oxford Publishing Company. pp. 17, 102, 165. ISBN 978-0-9028-8821-0. OCLC 815661.
