= GWR 1361 Class =

British steam locomotive class (1910–1962)

1361 Class
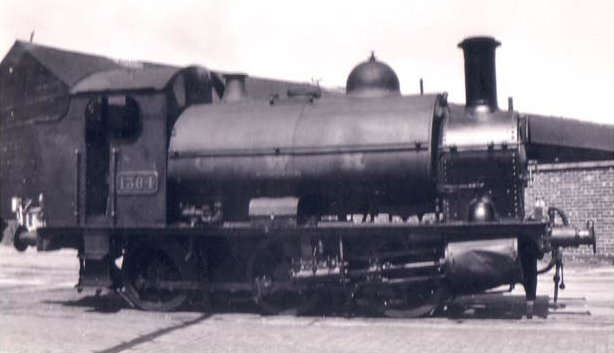
- 1364 at Plymouth Dock in 1948
Type and origin
- Power type: Steam
- Designer: G. J. Churchward
- Builder: GWR Swindon Works
- Order number: Lot 179
- Serial number: 2375–2379
- Build date: 1910
- Total produced: 5
Specifications
- Configuration
  - Whyte: 0-6-0ST
  - UIC: C nt
- Gauge: 4 ft 8 1/2 in (1,435 mm) standard gauge
- Driver dia.: 3 ft 8 in (1.118 m)
- Minimum curve: 2 chains (132 ft; 40 m)
- Wheelbase: 11 ft 0 in (3.35 m)
- Length: 25 ft 7 1/2 in (7.81 m) over buffers
- Width: 8 ft 6 in (2.591 m)
- Height: 11 ft 7 in (3.531 m)
- Axle load: 12 long tons 0 cwt (26,900 lb or 12.2 t) (12.2 t; 13.4 short tons)
- Loco weight: 35 long tons 4 cwt (78,800 lb or 35.8 t) (35.8 t; 39.4 short tons) full
- Fuel type: Coal
- Fuel capacity: 2 long tons 0 cwt (4,500 lb or 2 t) (2.0 t; 2.2 short tons)
- Water cap.: 800 imp gal (3,600 L; 960 US gal)
- Firebox
  - Grate area: 10.71 sq ft (0.995 m^{2})
- Boiler: GWR 1392
- Boiler pressure: 150 lbf/in^{2} (1,030 kPa)
- Heating surface
  - Firebox: 74.75 sq ft (6.945 m^{2})
  - Tubes: 815.5 sq ft (75.76 m^{2})
  - Total surface: 890.25 sq ft (82.707 m^{2})
- Cylinders: Two, outside
- Cylinder size: 16 in × 20 in (406 mm × 508 mm)
Performance figures
- Tractive effort: 14,835 lbf (65.99 kN)
Career
- Operators: Great Western Railway; British Railways
- Power class: Unclassed
- Numbers: 1361–1365
- Axle load class: Unclassed
- Withdrawn: 1961–1962
- Disposition: One preserved, remainder scrapped

The 1361 Class were small 0-6-0ST steam locomotives built by the Great Western Railway at their Swindon Works, England, mainly for shunting in docks and other sidings where track curvature was too tight for large locomotives.

== History ==
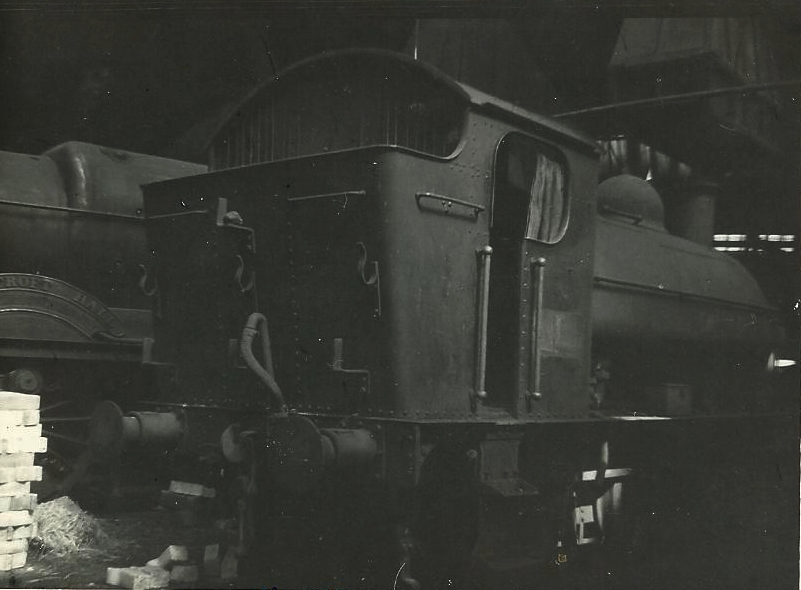
No. 1365 at Old Oak Common after it was withdrawn from service

The 1361 Class were designed by George Jackson Churchward as an update of the 1392 Class, originally built in 1874 for the Cornwall Minerals Railway. As such they combined unusual and outdated elements, such as saddle tanks and Allan valve gear, with current Great Western details such as the cab, bunker and many minor fittings. G.W.R. 0-6-0T were generally being converted to have Belpaire fireboxes and pannier tanks by this date, but the firebox on the 1361 was round topped, so the saddle tank was more appropriate. The 11 ft 0 in (3.35 m) wheelbase allowed them to negotiate 2 chains (132 ft; 40 m) radius curves, a requirement for work in docks and on lightly laid branch lines. Although the design is credited to the Churchward, Harold Holcroft was the junior draughtsman who did the actual work on the class.

The five locomotives were built at Swindon in 1910 and were worked alongside the ex-Cornwall Minerals Railway locomotives. Their usual home was Plymouth Millbay, Devon, (later Laira shed) from where they worked in Millbay Docks and on the Sutton Harbour branch. Until 1928 some of the class could also be found at St Blazey engine shed, Cornwall, where they worked on ex-Cornwall Minerals Railway branches, and also at Moorswater for working the Looe branch.

In 1920 one locomotive was transferred to Newton Abbot, Devon, for shunting the railway workshops there, doing so until 1952. Other allocations were Taunton (1953–1961) for working at Bridgwater, Somerset, (again, mainly in the town's docks), and Swindon (1956–1961). One was tried briefly on the Weymouth Harbour Tramway in 1949, and another went to St Philips Marsh, Bristol in 1962.

The same basic design was used for the six 1366 Class locomotives built in 1934, but this time they were fitted with Belpaire fireboxes, pannier tanks and more modern cabs. When the 1361s were withdrawn their remaining jobs were given to D2000 diesel shunters. All five examples were in service over 50 years.

== Preservation ==
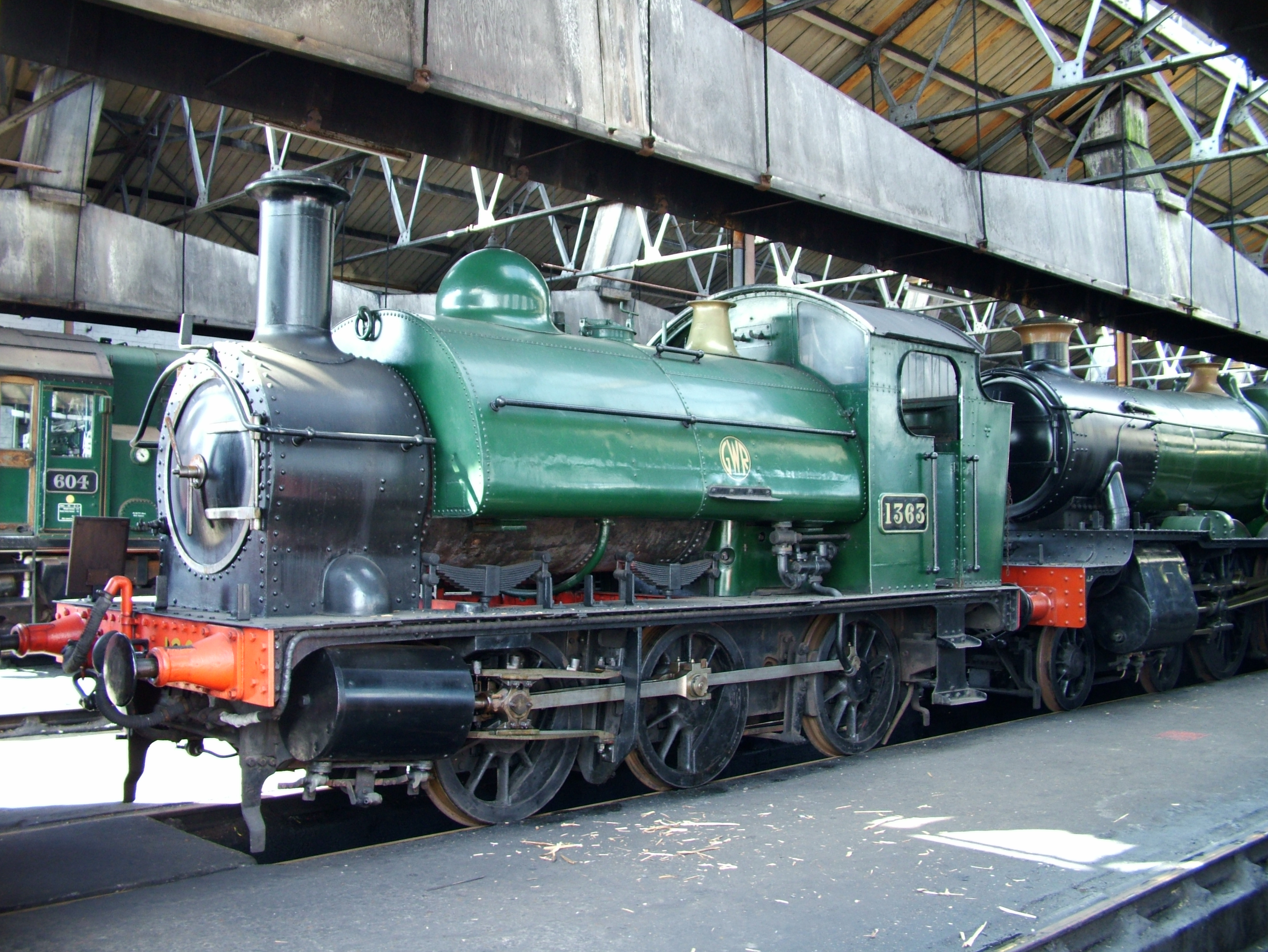
1363 at Didcot Railway Centre, 2005

One member of the 1361 class, No. 1363, was purchased for preservation by a group of members from the Great Western Society in 1964, two years after it was withdrawn from British Railways service at Laira. It was run to Totnes on the South Devon Railway under its own steam, and was restored there. No. 1363 is based at the Didcot Railway Centre, and as of 2014 was dismantled for overhaul to working order.

== Locomotives ==
Number	Built	Withdrawn	Notes
1361	1910	1961	
1362	1910	1961	
1363	1910	1962	Preserved at Didcot Railway Centre, currently under overhaul.
1364	1910	1961	
1365	1910	1962	

== Models ==
Kernow Model Rail Centre announced plans in 2014 to manufacture an 00 gauge model of the 1361 class in conjunction with DJ Models. The model is being made in partnership with the Great Western Society at Didcot. Heljan models announced in 2015 plans to also manufacture a model of this class. Both manufacturers are offering the same livery variants (in some cases on the same locomotive modelled), and similar prices. Heljan's model was released in early 2017 in conjunction with a GWR 1366 class. Kernow's model, produced by DJ Models, was released in March 2018. Both models are manufactured in China. An 0 gauge model kit is produced by Agenoria, now marketed by Ragstone Models.
