= Wenman Joseph Bassett-Lowke =

English toy construction-kit manufacturer

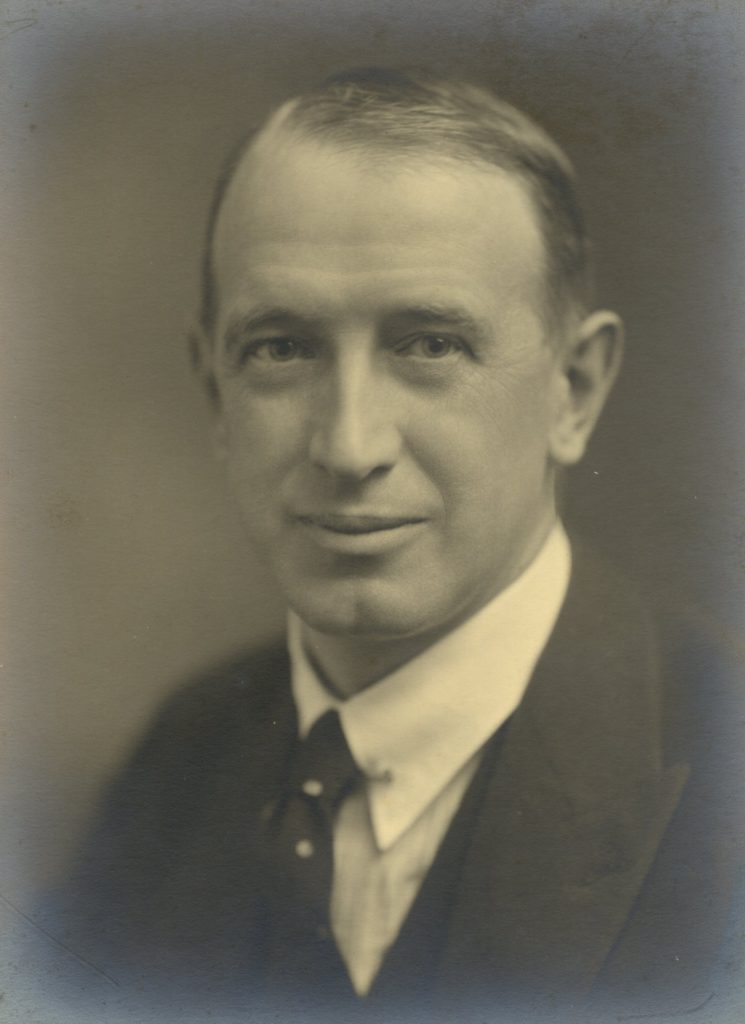
Wenman Joseph Bassett-Lowke, in the 1920s

Wenman Joseph Bassett-Lowke (27 December 1877 Northampton – 21 October 1953) was the son of Joseph Tom Lowke, a Northampton boilermaker and his wife, Eliza, and is noted for having founded the firm of Bassett-Lowke which specialised in producing construction sets, and model railways, boats and ships. He was married to Florence Jane Jones (9 May 1886 – 8 February 1973) on 21 March 1917.

== Career ==
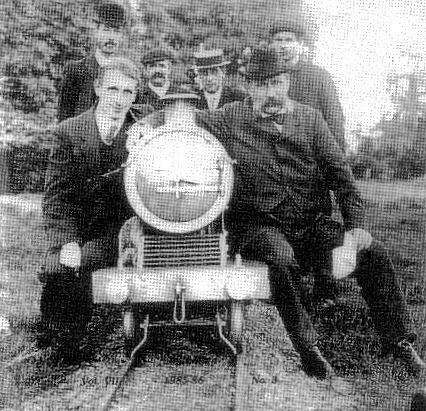
Wenman Joseph Bassett-Lowke in the front left on the 'Blacolvesley’ locomotive

Bassett-Lowke was actively interested in modern design, notably becoming a patron of the architect and designer Charles Rennie Mackintosh, who remodelled Basset-Lowke's home at 78 Derngate, Northampton. Now a Grade II* listed building, the house (which has been fully restored) is now open as a museum and visitor attraction. He also employed the services of the stained glass artist E.W. Twining to provide much of his company's graphic identity. His close contacts with German toy manufacturers, particularly Gebruder Bing, introduced him to the very advanced state of design in Germany and organisations such as the Deutscher Werkbund. He was quick to join its British equivalent, the Design and Industries Association, founded at the opening of the Great War.

It is notable that in 1925–26 Lowke commissioned the German architect-designer Peter Behrens to design his house 'New Ways' in Northampton (now considered the first modernist building in the UK) rather than any UK architect. Lowke adhered to Fabian socialist politics, serving as the executive of the Fabian Society from 1922 until 1924. He greatly admired George Bernard Shaw, to the extent of having him modelled as an '0' scale railway platform accessory. He supported Stephan Bing and other members of the family when, as Jews, they fled Nazi Germany to the UK in 1933.

Although Bassett-Lowke left school at thirteen, he absorbed many new ideas from his travelling and contact with people from all walks of life. He went on fact-finding missions to Germany and Holland. He was also keen to ensure that the outside world appreciated the benefits of Northampton. In 1932, he was instrumental in producing a film showing Northampton’s history and current attractions. Despite his incessant travel, Bassett-Lowke never thought of leaving Northampton. He was a member of many societies, including the Rotary Club, of which he was a founder. His work on the Northampton Council gave him the most opportunity to influence the future of the town. He was also a founder and director of the Northampton Repertory Theatre in 1926.

== Monument ==
In January 2011, it was announced that W.J Bassett-Lowke would be commemorated with a steel sculpture placed alongside the River Nene near a cycle route which runs from Beckets Park towards Upton in Northampton. Bassett-Lowke was the winning choice following a public vote in Northamptonshire in which several potential 'local icons' were nominated. Charles Rennie Mackintosh and poet John Clare were also to be commemorated as part of the same project, having received the second and third highest number of votes respectively. The sculpture was installed in Beckets Park, close to 78 Derngate, in April 2013 and officially unveiled in August of that year by a group from Sustrans that included Aggie MacKenzie.

== Bibliography ==
- Wenman Joseph Bassett-Lowke: A Memoir of His Life and Achievements, 1877-1953 - Janet Bassett-Lowke, John Milner ISBN 978-1-900622-01-1
- The Bassett-Lowke Story - Roland Fuller ISBN 0-904568-34-2
