= Tony Marchington =

British chemist

Anthony Frank Marchington (2 December 1955 – 16 October 2011) was an English biotechnology entrepreneur and businessman, famous as the co-founder of Oxford Molecular, and the former owner of the famous Class A3 4472 Flying Scotsman locomotive.

== Early life ==
Born in Buxton, Derbyshire, he was brought up on the family farm in Buxworth. He passed his motorcycle test at the age of 16, having learned to ride his father's 1914 Bradbury motorcycle and sidecar combination. He attended New Mills Grammar School. He gained his bachelor's degree, master's and D.Phil. at Brasenose College, Oxford.

== Association with Walter Hooper ==
While at Oxford, Marchington befriended and later lodged with American Walter Hooper, the last personal secretary of the writer C. S. Lewis. Through this relationship Marchington shared a lectern with Hooper in 1975 in North Carolina, co-wrote the script of Through Joy and Beyond (the 1977 documentary life of Lewis), and created the Lewis bonfire hoax letter, sent to Christianity and Literature in 1978.

== Career ==
Marchington began his career as a product manager with ICI Agrochemicals in 1983, becoming marketing manager for South America in 1986.

In 1988, he started several companies in the areas of intellectual property, drug discovery and biotechnology. As these expanded, in the same year, under his tutor Professor Graham Richards, Marchington co-founded Oxford Molecular Ltd. (later to become Oxford Molecular Plc.). Worth £450 million at its peak, it was eventually sold for £70million.

A former member of the Department of Trade and Industry's Competitiveness Advisory Group, from 2000 Marchington's entrepreneurial activities included: running Marchington Consulting, based at the Sheffield Bioincubator; CEO at Savyon Diagnostics; and co-founded, as chairman and director, Venture Hothouse Ltd. From 2010, Marchington was CEO at Oxford Medical Diagnostics.

Marchington was made a Freeman of the City of London in 1997 and was an honorary fellow of St Edmund Hall, Oxford.

== Steam preservation ==
=== Buxworth Steam Collection ===
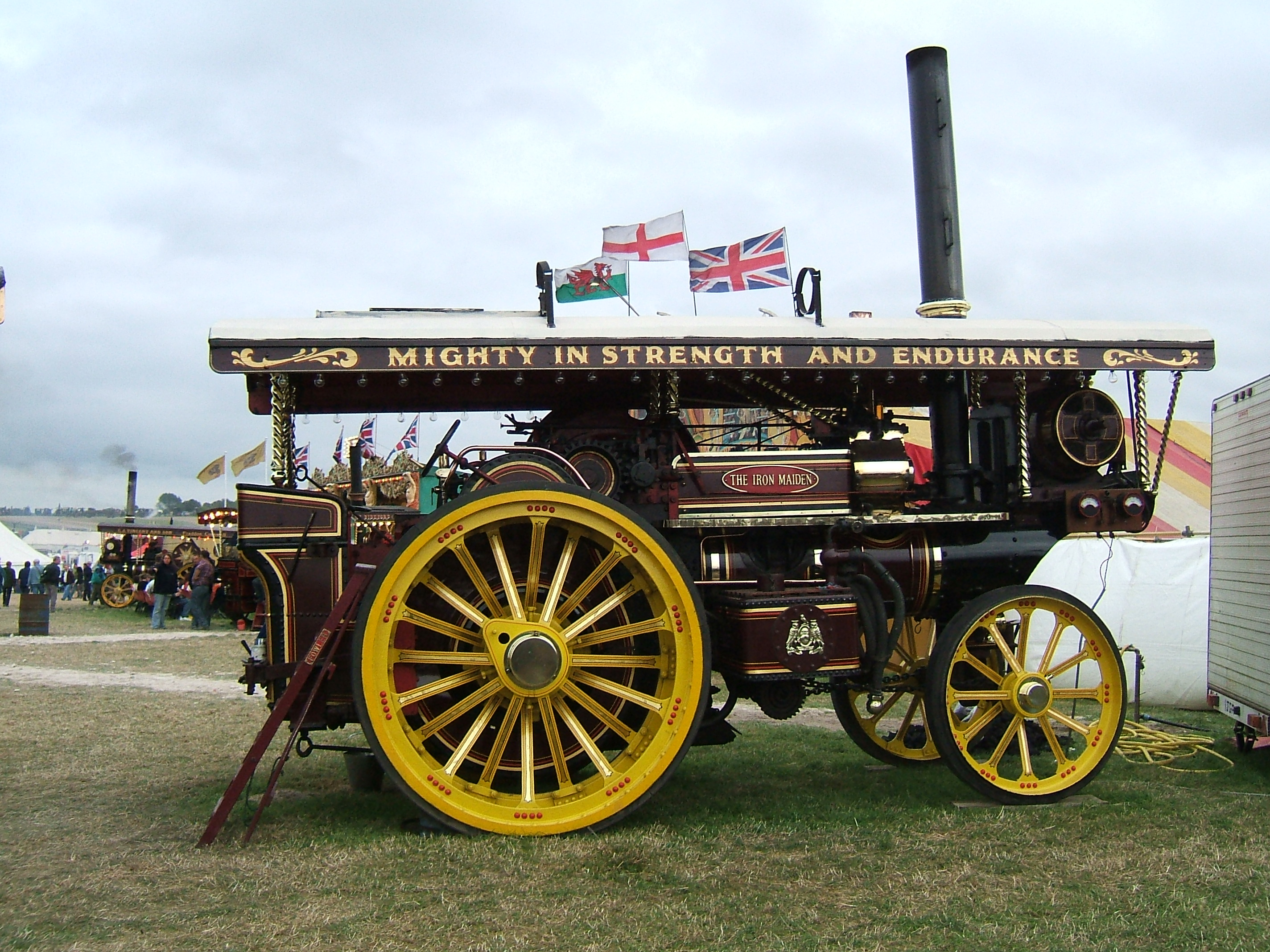
The Iron Maiden at the Great Dorset Steam Fair, 2007

A steam fan from a young age, aged 22 Marchington bought his first steamroller from haulage contractor and scrap dealer Ted Eansworth in Chesterfield. The collection that he started with his father eventually became the Buxworth Steam Group, which comprised a full working Victorian fair, and raised revenue through offering them for hire:

- 25 traction engines, including the famous showman's engine The Iron Maiden, which starred in the film of the same name.
- Two matched pairs of ploughing engines
- Two steam wagons
- Six steamrollers
- Road locomotive, built in 1900, which was the first armour-plated vehicle in the world
- Steam fire engine
- Seagoing steam tug
- Victorian fairground rides: 1893 Steam Galloping Horses, a Helter skelter, a Ferris wheel, cakewalk, a 1925 set of German-built Chair-O-Planes
- Wall of Death, with 1930s Indian motorcycle

Marchington's Buxworth Steam Group was the star of the 1985 BBC documentary 'A Gambol on Steam', which featured his first steam rally in the group, hosted at Lyme Park, and featured exhibits from names such as Fred Dibnah in addition to his current collection of a 1904 Fowler D2 steamroller and his pair of Fowler BB1 ploughing engines ('Fame' and 'Fortune') and was one of the largest rallies of its time.

=== LNER Class A3 4472 Flying Scotsman ===
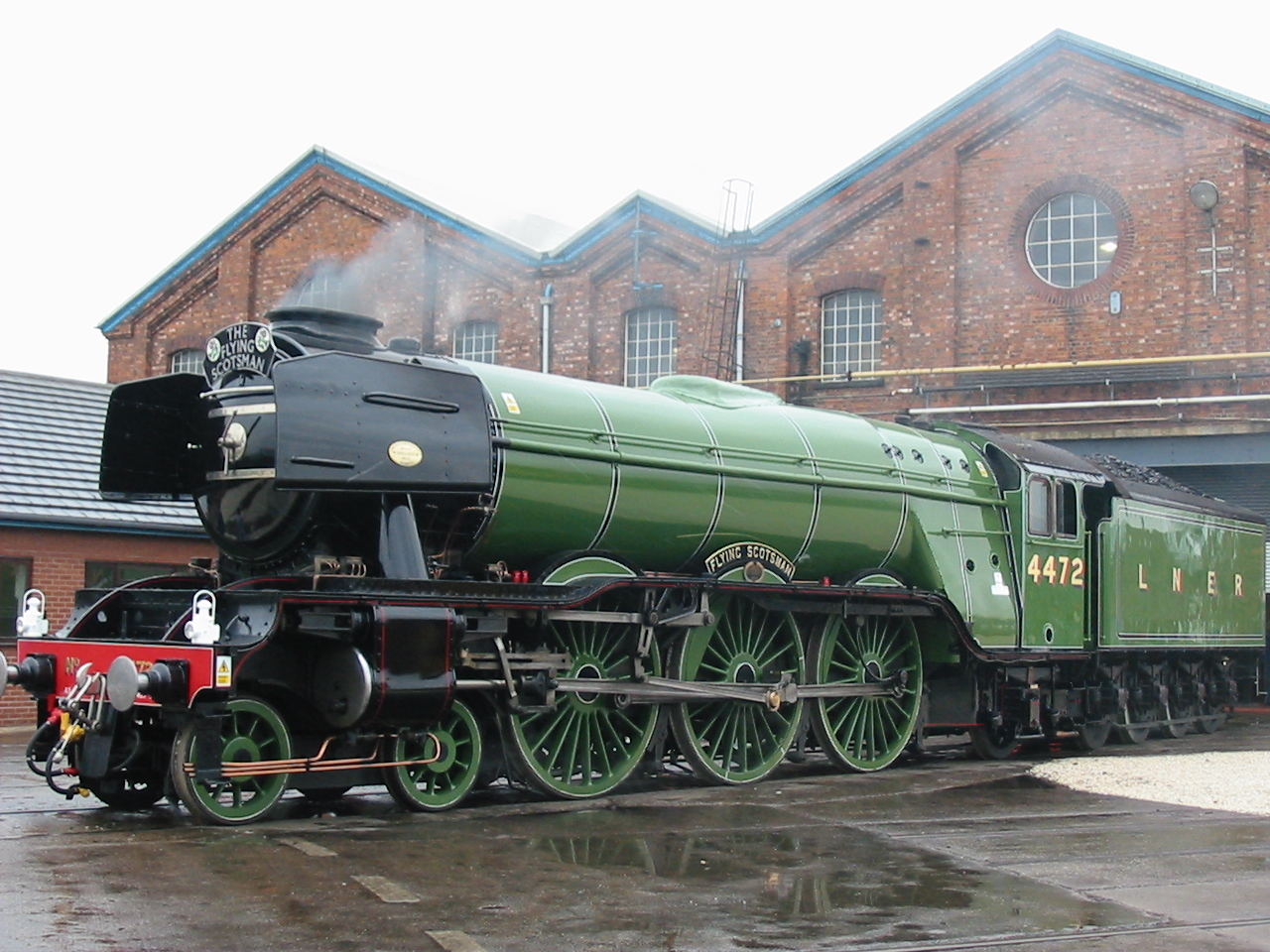
Class A3 4472 Flying Scotsman at Doncaster, while under the ownership of Dr Tony Marchington

In 1996, Marchington bought the famous LNER steam locomotive Class A3 4472 Flying Scotsman at a cost of £1.5M. After a three-year restoration which cost an additional £1M, she returned to steam in 1999. She made an appearance on Peak Rail in summer 2000, together with most of the Buxworth Steam Group collection.

In 1997, Marchington purchased LNER Class A4 4464 Bittern from the family of Geoff Drury, which he also based at the Southall Railway Centre. However, after the completion of the £1 million over-budget restoration of Flying Scotsman was complete, he sold Bittern in 2000 to Jeremy Hosking, who moved her to the Mid-Hants Railway in Hampshire in January 2001, for a major restoration. Despite this, the ownership of both Bittern and Flying Scotsman meant that he is still the only ever private owner to own two Gresley Pacific class locomotives.

With Flying Scotsman's regular use on the VSOE Pullman, in 2002, Marchington proposed a business plan, which included the construction of a 'Flying Scotsman Village' in Edinburgh, to create revenue from associated branding. After floating on OFEX as 'Flying Scotsman Plc.' in the same year, in 2003 Edinburgh City Council turned down the village plans, and in September 2003 Marchington was declared bankrupt. This resulted in the sale of most of the assets of the Buxworth Steam Group, including The Iron Maiden to Graeme Atkinson, who displays the engine alongside a collection of other engines and fair organs as part of the Scarborough Fair Collection, at his holiday park in Lebberston, near Scarborough, North Yorkshire.

At the company's AGM in October 2003, CEO Peter Butler announced losses of £474,619, and with a £1.5M overdraft at Barclays Bank, stated that the company only had enough cash to trade until April 2004. The company's shares were suspended from OFEX on 3 November 2003, after it failed to declare interim results.

With the locomotive effectively placed up for sale, after a high-profile national campaign it was bought in April 2004 by the National Railway Museum in York, and it is now part of the National Collection.

Marchington's time with the Flying Scotsman was documented in the Channel 4 documentaries A Steamy Affair: The Story of Flying Scotsman, directed by former Blue Peter presenter Simon Groom.

== Personal life ==
Marchington met his second wife Caroline after he and his father offered her a lift on their steam engine to the Devonshire Arms, Peak Forest, the local public house on the A6 road, where they were staying that night. The couple had two children, and family homes in Buxton, Derbyshire and Oxfordshire. He also had two children from a previous marriage. His passion for vintage restoration continued with his family for the rest of his life, even after the sagas of Buxworth Steam Group and Flying Scotsman.

After meeting Jim Daniel, the Grand Secretary of the United Grand Lodge of England, at a dinner of Brasenose College members, Marchington was initiated as a Freemason at Oxford-based Apollo University Lodge number 357 in January 1991. He was passed and raised the following year, and went into the chair in November 1996. Marchington celebrated his installation as Worshipful Master of the Lodge with the commissioning of a set of limited edition glass tankards, engraved with the square and compasses on one side and the Flying Scotsman on the other.

Marchington joined a number of other Masonic Orders, including the Holy Royal Arch, the Order of the Red Cross of Constantine, the Order of Mark Master Masons, and the Royal Ark Mariners. He was appointed a Provincial Grand Steward for Oxfordshire in 1997, and became Oxfordshire's Assistant Provincial Grand Master in 1998.

After a long period of treatment, Marchington died of cancer at Buxton's Cottage Hospital on 16 October 2011.
