= The Iron Maiden =

1963 film by Gerald Thomas

- Film poster
- Directed by: Gerald Thomas
- Written by: Leslie Bricusse; Vivian Cox
- Produced by: Peter Rogers; Frank Bevis
- Starring: Michael Craig; Anne Helm; Jeff Donnell; Alan Hale Jr.
- Cinematography: Alan Hume
- Edited by: Archie Ludski
- Music by: Eric Rogers
- Distributed by: Anglo-Amalgamated Film Distributors
- Release dates: 3 January 1963 (London); 4 February 1963 (UK)
- Running time: 98 minutes
- Country: United Kingdom
- Language: English
- Budget: $750,000

The Iron Maiden is a 1963 British comedy film. The film was directed by Gerald Thomas, and stars Michael Craig, Anne Helm, Jeff Donnell and Alan Hale Jr. There are minor roles for Carry On stalwarts Jim Dale and Joan Sims, and the veteran actor Sam Kydd also appears with his then six-year-old son Jonathan Kydd. The film is known as The Swinging Maiden in America.

== Plot ==
Jack Hopkins is an aircraft designer and hands-on engineer with a passion for traction engines and he owns one called The Iron Maiden. His boss, Sir Giles Thompson, is eager to sell a new supersonic jet aircraft (which Jack has designed) to American millionaire airline owner, Paul Fisher, who has come to England with his wife and daughter Kathy.

The first encounter between Fisher and Jack goes badly, as (without knowing their connection) the traction engine crashes into the front of Fisher's car on a narrow lane. They then meet again at the airfield where the aircraft is shown to Paul Fisher and they recognise each other. Fisher has developed a disliking of Jack (without knowing he is the aircraft designer) and states that he will not purchase the aircraft (which he is very happy with) unless he likes the designer. Later Jack goes to the Fisher's hotel and meets Fisher and talks to him about the aircraft.

Fisher asks Jack to take Kathy to see some friends (her hire car broke down before she got it) while he looks at a rival aircraft built by Lord Upshott. His son Humphrey Gore-Brown takes the Fisher in his car. On the way Jack and Kathy stop to see a Duchess which is another traction engine powering a ferris wheel. It is broken and while Jack works on it, Kathy sits in a chair and when it suddenly starts, she is taken up. However, it stops again and she ends up trapped in mid-air and it starts to pour rain. When Fisher climbs to rescue her, the owner gets it going and brings her down but Jack gets stuck at the top. It breaks down again and cannot be restarted. She then takes his car, but abandons it in the middle of nowhere. Jack tracks her to her friends and finds out where his car was left.

Sir Giles invites the Fishers to the Ascot Racecourse but again they have problems, coming across a broken-down traction engine called "Princess Caroline". Jack tries to help fix it. While here Sir Giles and Kathy get tar all over themselves, inside their Rolls-Royce and on Mrs Fisher. Lord Upshott of the opposition aircraft company then arrives and takes the Fishers to Ascot. Sir Giles believes that he has lost the sale to Fisher and sacks Jack, but he also resigns.

Kathy goes to see Jack at his fireman Fred Trotter's house where the traction engine is that day. After parking the Iron Maiden on the road, Kathy attempts to drive it out of the way of her car and takes off down the road. She runs over a policeman's pushbike and crashes into a barn. Jack spanks Kathy and she runs to her parents. This has damaged The Iron Maiden's safety valve, rendering it impossible to be driven solo.

Jack is desperate to enter the annual Woburn Abbey steam rally with the machine. Fred and Jack head off and stop at Fred's house to get some "grub". While there Fisher turns up to take Jack to task about what he did to his daughter. However, Fred breaks his leg by falling over his son's roller skate and is unable to participate. He then runs over the policeman's new pushbike and forces Fisher's car into a ditch. Jack gives Fisher a lift when his car cannot get out of the ditch. When all seems lost, Fisher is won over by Jack's plight and joins him in driving the engine, and the two soon become firm friends (Fisher says he was stoking boilers when Jack was in short pants - probably a reference to actor Alan Hale Jr's role as Casey Jones).

It is a long trip to Woburn and they have to stop a number of times, including overnight where they camp next to the engine. The next morning they cook breakfast on a shovel, but leave a bag of coal at the campsite. They take a short cut through land owned by the rival traction engine owner, Admiral Sir Digby Trevelyan (his engine is "England Expects"). The Admiral has laid a trap of a hidden pit. They go into the pit and get stuck. They steal all his wooden "no trespassing" signs to use as fuel. After a lot of digging, they eventually get out and continue on their way. They are still short of fuel so they have to burn bags, their footwear and clothing, leaving them in their underclothes.

After an eventful journey, Fisher and Jack finally reach Woburn Abbey and enter the rally, which includes almost every English traction engine of the period, around 100 in total. The Iron Maiden arrives just in time. When Fisher collects a bag of coal, he injures his back and withdraws from the race within the rally. Mrs Fisher and Kathy previously arrived with Lord Upshott (Gore-Brown's father) and the Duke of Bedford and witness Fisher in his underwear running with the coal.

When all seems lost, Kathy decides to join Jack on the engine. The two pilot The Iron Maiden from last place to first, winning the race; at the finish line, Jack and Kathy embrace and kiss, while The Iron Maiden boils over and explodes. The engine is memorialised when Jack's new jet is named after it.

== Cast ==
- Michael Craig as Jack Hopkins
- Anne Helm as Kathy Fisher
- Jeff Donnell as Miriam Fisher
- Alan Hale Jr. as Paul Fisher
- Noel Purcell as Admiral Sir Digby Trevelyan
- Cecil Parker as Sir Giles Thompson
- Roland Culver as Lord Upshott
- Joan Sims as Nellie Trotter
- John Standing as Humphrey Gore-Brown
- Brian Oulton as Vicar
- Sam Kydd as Fred Trotter
- Judith Furse as Mrs. Webb
- Cyril Chamberlain as Mrs. Webb's Cabman
- Richard Thorp as Harry Markham
- Jim Dale as Bill
- George Woodbridge as Sid Ludge
- Ian Wilson as Sidney Webb
- Brian Rawlinson as Albert, Village Constable
- Raymond Glendenning as The Rally's M.C.
- Ian Russell, 13th Duke of Bedford as Himself

== Production ==
A Handley Page Victor military bomber is featured in the film as Hopkins' supersonic jetliner. A number of sequences show a Victor in close-up, taxiing, taking off, climbing, flying past and landing with drogue parachute deployed. These scenes were filmed at Radlett Aerodrome.

== History of the traction engine The Iron Maiden ==
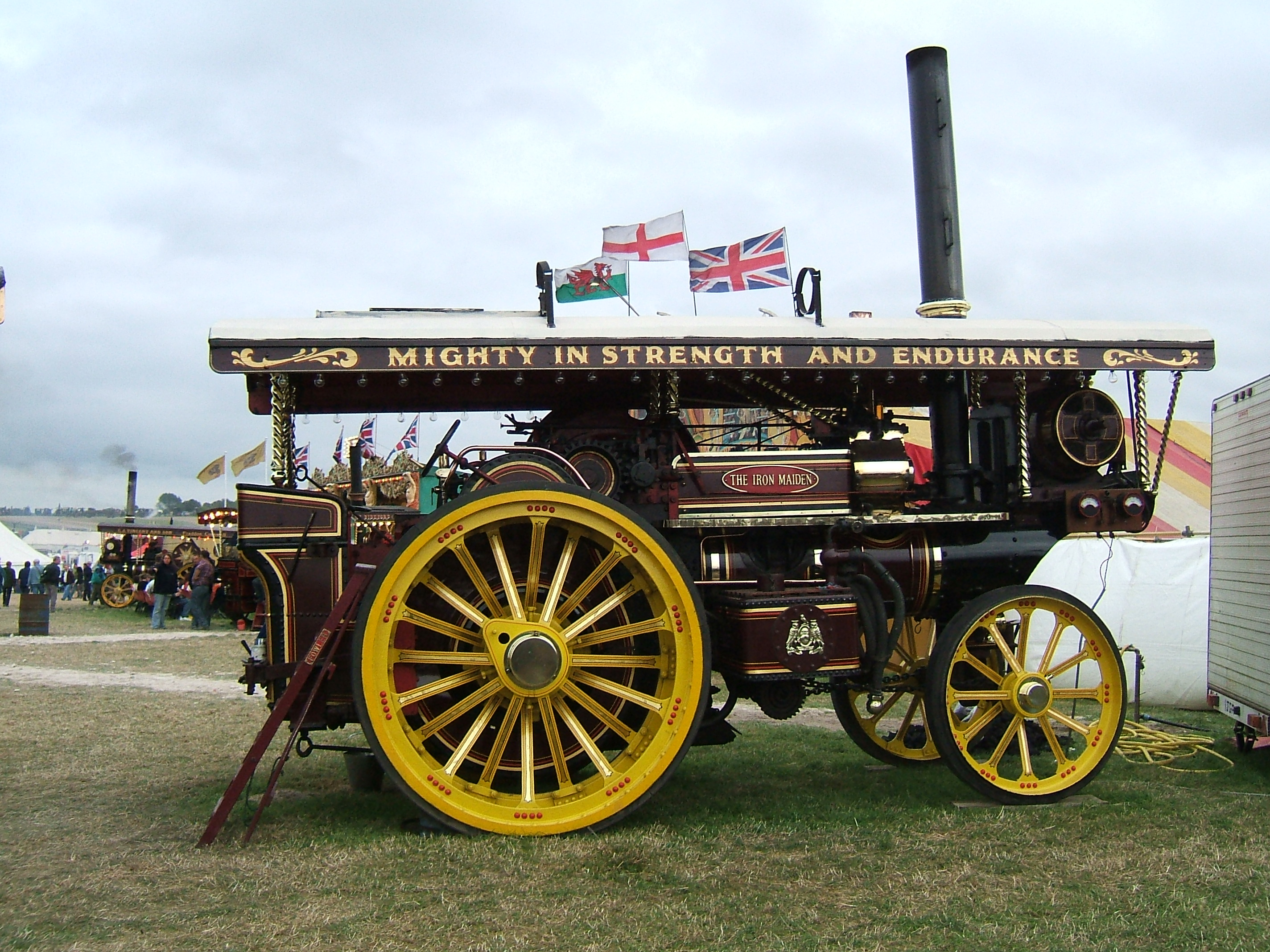
The Iron Maiden in preservation. (Great Dorset Steam Fair – 2007)

The traction engine that featured as The Iron Maiden was a John Fowler & Co. 7 nhp showman's road locomotive (works no. 15657, reg no. FX 6661). She was built in September 1920 as a class R3 road locomotive for heavy haulage work and saw many years' service on the Isle of Portland, hauling blocks of stone from the quarries to the harbour.

She returned to Fowler's works for conversion into a showman's engine, which entailed the addition of a dynamo bracket in front of the chimney, and a full-length canopy, among other things. Once converted she was based in Alfreton, Derbyshire, and undertook fairground work, until bought for preservation in 1952. From new she was named Kitchener – until the film was made, whereupon she was renamed The Iron Maiden.

The engine was first owned during restoration by John Crawley, the man behind its use in the production of the film. The engine also appeared in 1963 film Live It Up! in the Gene Vincent musical interlude. It was then sold to George Hawkins, before passing into the Dr Tony Marchington collection in Derbyshire, following its sale at the 1993 Great Dorset Steam Fair and became part of the same collection as Flying Scotsman. The Iron Maiden is today owned by Graeme Atkinson, who displays the engine alongside a collection of other engines and fair organs as part of the Scarborough Fair Collection, at his holiday park in Lebberston, near Scarborough, North Yorkshire. The engine was featured on the cover of the Official Programme for the 38th Great Dorset Steam Fair, in 2006, and continues to make regular appearances at that event.

It has also made at least one appearance at the Yorkshire Air Museum at Elvington near York to be photographed next to the Handley Page Victor belonging to Andre Tempest that is preserved there.
