= List of steam fairs =

A steam fair or steam rally is a regular organised gathering of historic steam-powered vehicles and machinery, open to the public. Typical exhibits include: traction engines, steam rollers, steam wagons, and steam cars. Often, the scope is widened to include other historic exhibits such as stationary engines, internal-combustion -powered road transport, agricultural and construction vehicles, working horses, woodcraft and the like.

A typical steam fairs consists of:

- A parade ring or track in which vehicles may be demonstrated
- Trade and craft stalls related to the exhibits
- Areas where vehicles may be examined more closely and the public may talk to owners and operators
- Entertainment areas (often, a beer tent) with food, drink, and evening music
- A fairgrounds area may also be included in the event

The following is a geographic list of these gatherings, some of which are referred to as rallies or as festivals. The list does not include static steam museums unless they host a particular event that falls into the classification.

In addition there are some travelling shows powered by steam. Where these are referred to as steam fairs they are included in the list.

== Australia ==
- Booleroo Steam & Traction Rally
- Hunter Valley Steamfest
- Lake Goldsmith steam rally (Twice yearly)
- Scoresby Steamfest
- Steam Rally Echuca Moama
- SteamFest Tasmania at Sheffield

== Canada ==
- Steam-Era - (Milton, Ontario)
- Threshermen's Reunion – (Austin, Manitoba)
- Georgian Bay Steam Show _ (Cookstown, Ontario)

== Germany ==
The German language article lists around 20 steam fairs, mainly annual and mainly in Germany.

== Ireland ==
- Eyrecourt
- Innishannon Steam and Vintage Rally – (1998- )
- Stradbally - Irish National Steam Rally – (1965- )
- Upton Steam Rally – ( -1997)

== Netherlands ==
- Dordt in Stoom, Dordrecht - (1985- ) bi-annual large event in and around the historic harbour district with steam powered ships, trains, river boats and other engines.

== Poland ==
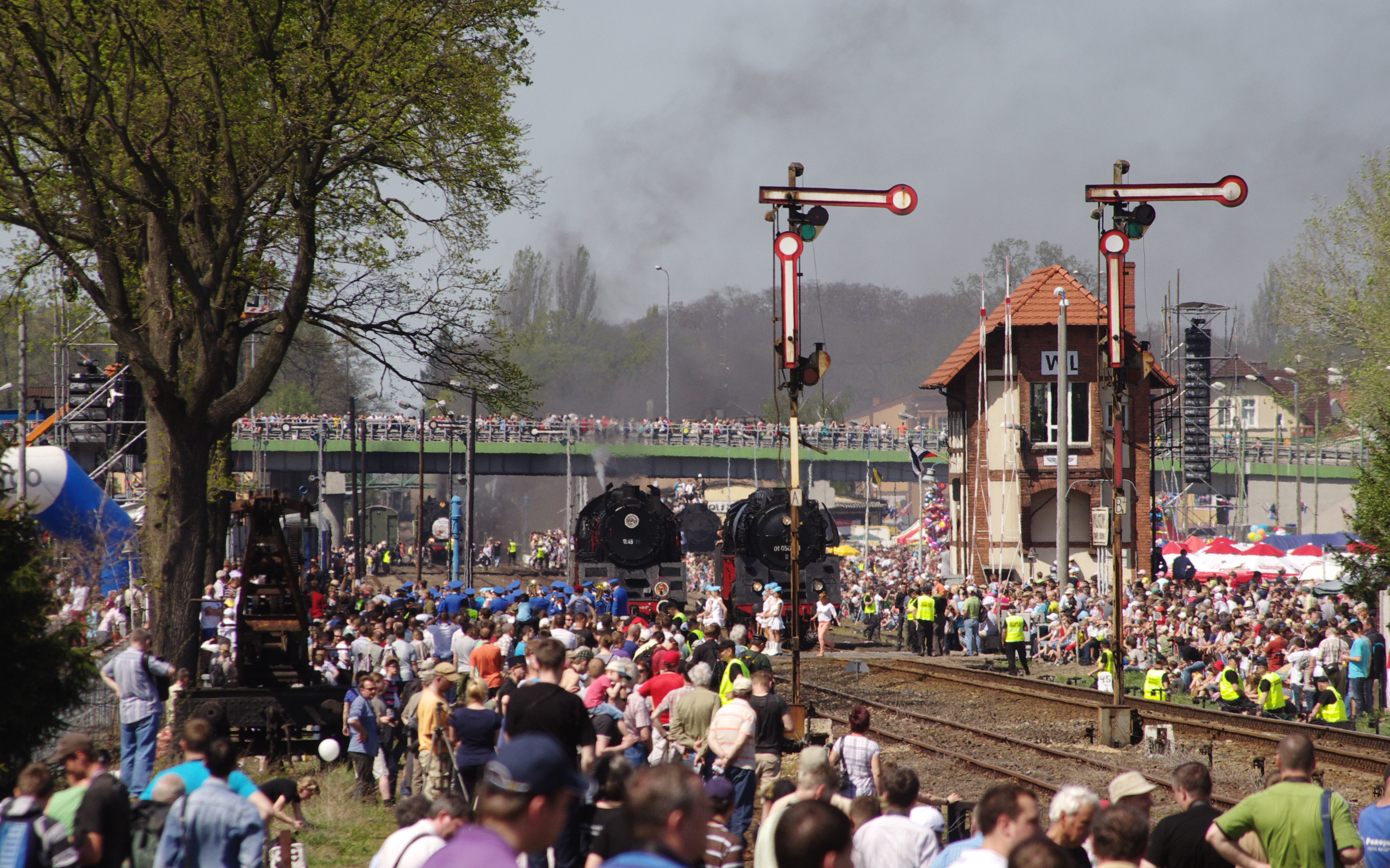
Steam locomotive parade in Wolsztyn

- Wolsztyn – (1993- ) annual steam locomotive parade held the last weekend of April near a historic roundhouse
- Chabówka – (2005- ) "Parowozjada" - steam locomotive parade held the last weekend of August in a railway museum near the railway station

== United Kingdom ==
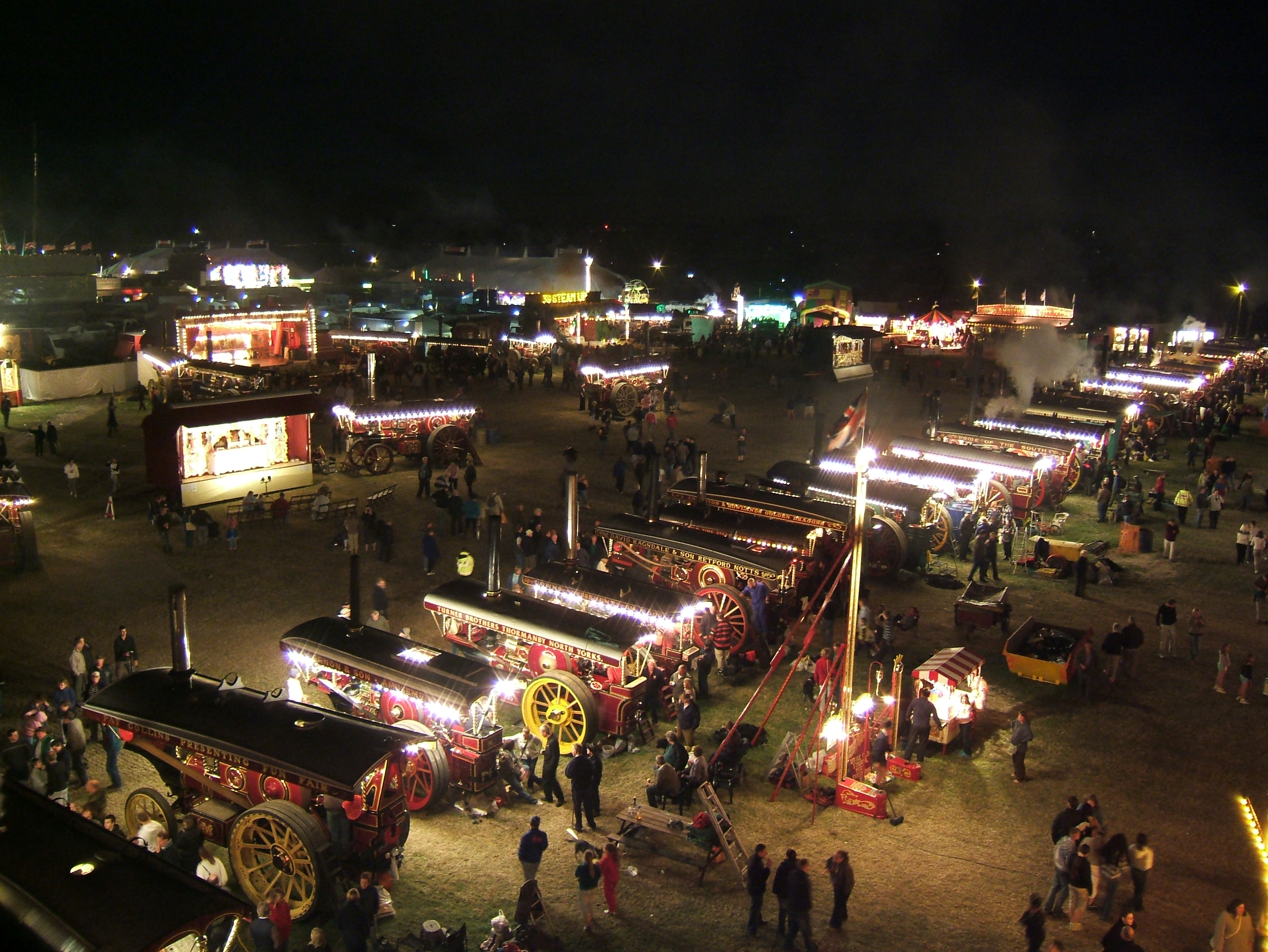
Great Dorset Steam Fair: night-time view of the line-up of 40+ showman's engines, in the vintage fairground section

=== Static events ===
Event	Location	Years active	Notes
1000 Engine Rally	Chelford, Cheshire	1985-	Staged in June
Abbey Hill Steam Rally	Yeovil, Somerset	1980-	
Astle Park Traction Engine Rally	Chelford, Cheshire		Staged in August
Barton Gate Charity Steam Rally	Barton Gate, Barton-under-Needwood, Staffordshire	1995-	
Boconnoc Steam Fair	Cornwall	1998-	
Bedfordshire Steam & Country Fayre	Bedfordshire		
Cadeby Steam & Country Fayre	Burtonwood Airfield, Lancashire	1970s-1980s	
Cadeby Steam & Country Fayre	Mallory Park, Kirkby Mallory, Leicestershire	1964-2008	44 years
Castle Combe	Castle Combe, Wiltshire		Held in May
Cambridgeshire Steam Rally	Swavesey	2009-	
Chickerell Steam and Vintage Show	Chickerell, Dorset	2004-	
Cromford Steam Rally	Brackenfield, Derbyshire		38 years (as of 2008)
Dacorum Steam & Country Fayre	Dacorum, Hertfordshire	2007-	
Great Dorset Steam Fair	Dorset	1968‒2024	
Grand Henham Steam Rally	Henham Park, Blythburgh, Suffolk	1974-	
Haddenham Steam Rally and Heavy Horse Show	Haddenham, Cambridgeshire	1974-	
Holcot Steam Rally & Country Fair	Holcot, Northamptonshire		11th year (2008)
Hollowell Steam Rally and Heavy Horse Show	Hollowell, Northamptonshire	1986-	
Hollycombe Steam Collection	Liphook, Hampshire	1971-	
Island Steam Show	Isle of Wight Steam Railway	1975-	
Kettering Vintage Rally & Steam Fayre	Kettering, Northamptonshire	2000-	
Knowl Hill Steam Rally	Knowl Hill, Berkshire	c. 1969-2004	
Lincolnshire Steam and Vintage Rally	Lincolnshire		23rd year (2008)
Market Bosworth Steam Rally	Cadeby, Leicestershire		
Netley Marsh Steam and Craft Fair	Netley Marsh, Hampshire	1971-	
Northleach Steam & Vintage Show	Northleach, Gloucestershire	c. 1950s-	
Mosterton Summer Show	Mosterton, Dorset		Latest Rally - 2 & 3 July 2011
Much Marcle Steam Rally	Much Marcle, Herefordshire	1986-	
Ringmer Steam & Country Show	Ringmer, East Sussex	2003-	
Rudgwick Steam & Country Show	Rudgwick, West Sussex	1987-	
Rushmoor Steam Rally	Rushmoor Arena, Aldershot, Hampshire	-c. 1991	
Somerset Steam Spectacular	Low Ham, Somerset		52nd year. mid July (2011)
Scorton Steam	Scorton, Lancashire	2005-	Held on third weekend in June
Shrewsbury Steam Rally	Shropshire	1962-	Late August Bank Holiday Sunday and Monday (Organised by The County of Salop Steam Engine Society)
Silloth Vintage Rally	Silloth Green, Silloth-on-Solway, Cumbria	2000-	Held on third weekend in July
Stoke Prior Steam Rally	Bromsgrove, Worcestershire		Held on the third weekend in September; Latest Rally 20-21 September 2025
Tavistock Steam Fair	Tavistock, Devon		
Torbay Steam Fair	Torbay, Devon	1987-	
Welland Steam & Country Rally	Welland, Worcestershire	1964-	
Wiston Steam Rally	West Sussex	2011-	
Wrotham Classic Steam and Transport Rally	Wrotham, Kent	1979-	Staged yearly

=== Travelling shows ===
- Carter's Steam Fair – (1976-2022) A travelling funfair that travelled throughout London and the home counties from Easter to Bonfire Night. Carters stopped travelling in 2022.

== United States ==
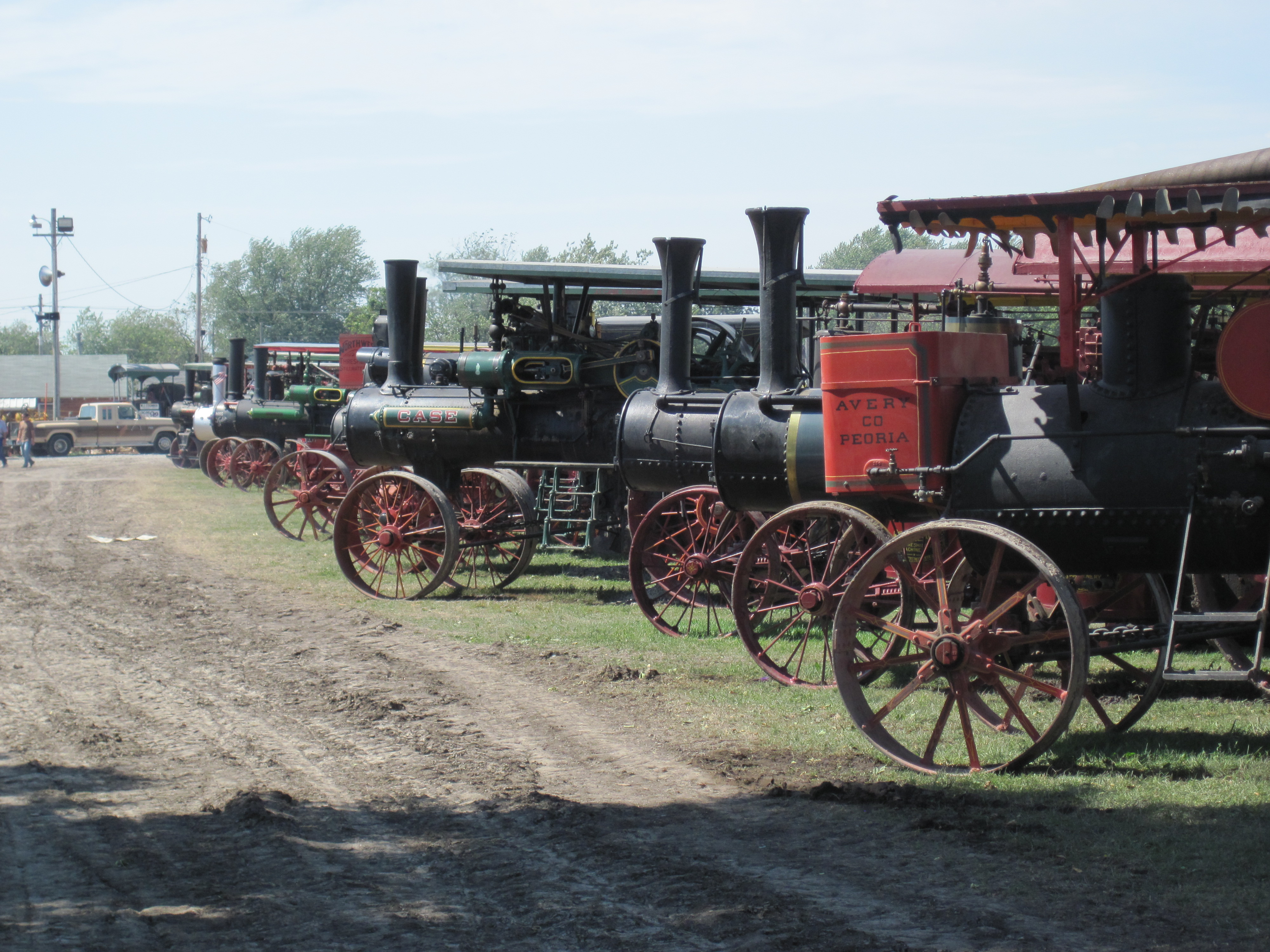
Steam tractor lineup at the 2010 Old Thresher's Reunion.

- Antique Gas & Steam Engine Museum - bi-annual show in Vista, California
- Antique Power and Steam Show - Large annual show taking place in the Lake County Fairgrounds in Indiana.
- Antique Powerland, Brooks Oregon. Annual Steam-Up
- Badger Steam and Gas Show - Annual show hosted by Badger Steam and Gas Engine Club near Baraboo, WI
- Buckley Old Engine Show - Annual show in Buckley, Michigan
- Cama Powerup Spring and Fall Kent, CT
- Central North Dakota Steam Thresher's Reunion – (1958- )
- The Dover Steam Show – (1964- ) Annual show hosted by Tuscarawas Valley Pioneer Power Association
- Great Steamboat Race - (1963- ) annual round trip race from Louisville, Kentucky to Jeffersonville, Indiana and back between steamboats on the Ohio River
- Kansas & Oklahoma Steam and Gas Engine Show (1982- ) annual show by the K&O Steam and Gas Engine Association in Winfield, Kansas.
- The Michigan Steam Engine and Threshers Club Reunion, Mason, MI.
- Missouri River Valley Steam Engine Association Back to the Farm Reunion Boonevill, MO
- National Threshers Association (1944- ) annual reunion/show held in Wauseon, Ohio, last full weekend of June
- Northwest Ohio Antique Machinery Association Antique Machinery Show - Findlay, OH
- Nowthen Threshing Show - Annual show held on the third full weekend (Friday-Sunday) in August, in Nowthen, Minnesota.
- Old Thresher's Reunion - (1960- ) Labor Day weekend, Mount Pleasant, Iowa.
- Pageant of Steam - (1960- ) annual fair held in Canandaigua, New York
- Pawnee Steam and Gas Engine Show - held first full weekend in May in Pawnee, OK
- Pioneer Engineers Club of Rushville, IN - yearly show in Rushville, IN
- Pioneer Steam and Gas Engine Society - Sagertown, PA.
- Riverbend Steam and Gas Association Allendale, MI
- Rock River Thresheree Edgerton, Wisconsin – (1955- )
- Rough and Tumble Engineers Historical Association Kinzers, Pennsylvania
- Shenandoah Valley Steam & Gas Engine Association, Berryville, VA "Pageant of Steam" held each year the last full weekend in July
- Soule’ Live Steam Festival and Railfest annual event held the first weekend in November in Meridian, MS.
- Southeast Old Threshers' Reunion annual event held July 1-July 5 in Denton, NC
- Steamstock: An Antiquarian Exposition in Point Richmond, CA is an annual event held in July in a former Ford motor factory, next to the Rosie the Riveter Museum.
- Tall Stacks - held every 3 or 4 years in Cincinnati, Ohio since 1988; is a fair for steam powered riverboats.
- Tuckahoe Steam & Gas Association near Easton, MD - annual "Steam Show" (1973- ) in early July.
- Western Minnesota Steam Thresher's Reunion (WMSTR) Rollag, Minnesota
- Western New York Gas & Steam Engine Association Annual Rally - Alexander, NY

== See also ==
- Live steam
- Hollycombe Steam Collection – essentially a steam fair, but in the form of a museum
- Thursford Collection – steam museum featuring traction engines
