= Former Odeon cinemas in Leeds =

Coordinates: 53.799°N 1.542°W

Two Odeon cinemas were formerly located in Leeds, West Yorkshire, England:

== The Headrow ==
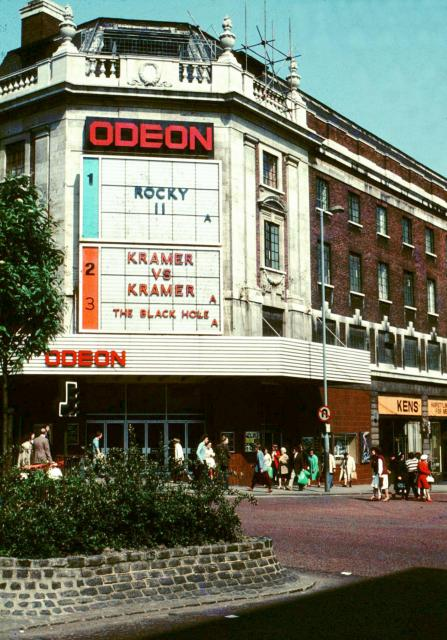
The cinema in 1979

Located at the junction of Briggate with the Headrow, the Odeon first opened as the Paramount Theatre with a showing of The Smiling Lieutenant, starring Maurice Chevalier, in 1932. The Paramount had seating for 2,556 in stalls and circle levels, and featured the fourth largest Wurlitzer organ in Europe. The Wurlitzer was removed from the Odeon during the mid-1960s as is now happily playing at Thursford Collection in Thursford, Norfolk. The resident organist at Thursford is Robert Wolfe. The Cinema was very popular and had 1.2 million patrons during its first year.

In 1940 the name was changed to the Odeon following the purchase of the Paramount cinemas in the United Kingdom by the owner of Odeon, the Rank Organisation and became a concert venue, while still being a cinema. In 1963 and 1964 it staged three concerts by The Beatles.

The Rolling Stones performed at the Odeon Theatre with Ike & Tina Turner, The Yardbirds, and Peter Jay & the New Jaywalkers in 1966.

In 1969 it was converted to a twin cinema, and in 1978 a third screen was built in the former Paramount Restaurant.

In 1988 the Odeon was refurbished and made into a 5-screen cinema with a reduced seating capacity of 1,923.

The Odeon, which was the last picture palace in the city centre, closed due to competition with local multiplexes and the impending opening of a thirteen screen multiplex at The Light retail and leisure complex originally operated by Ster Century and now Vue, it closed in 2001. The building which was originally to be converted to an apartment & leisure complex but was almost immediately bought by Primark who converted it into a large three storey clothes store that opened in August 2005. The building is now a Sports Direct store.

The Paramount Cinema's architects were designed by Frank Verity and Samuel Beverley.

== Merrion Centre ==
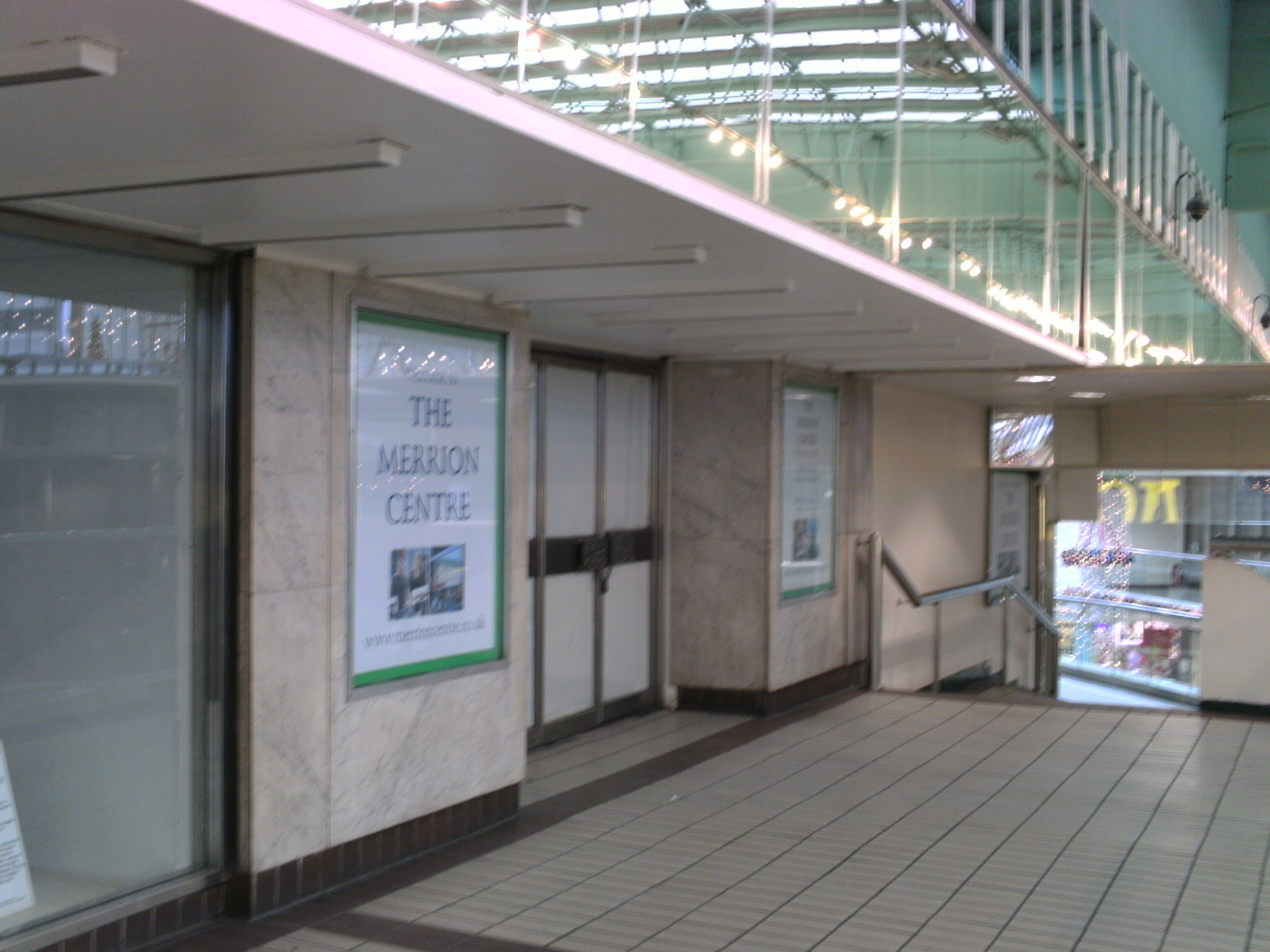
The former first floor entrance to the Merrion Odeon

The former Odeon cinema in the Merrion Centre is now largely forgotten but the site remains behind locked doors as it did in the 1970s. The cinema was the first to be built in Leeds since the 1930s however the site only operated as a cinema for 13 years between 1964 and 1977 before it was closed.

Where some Yorkshire Bank cash machines are within the centre was the main entry into a cinema that could accommodate nearly 1,000 film fans, The doors have now been boarded up but remain padlocked behind the wall holding the cash machines.

The cinema occupies a space above the current Home Bargains (formerly Woolworths) and if you take the stairs in the Merrion Centre to the upper level you can still see a second set of doors into the former cinema near an entrance into the Merrion Centre car park.

The projection equipment has been removed, as have the seats but much of the building remains untouched. The cinema is now inaccessible but in 2002 Greg Taylor, who works for a TV company was inside the redundant building scouting for possible TV locations and took a series of photographs.

In a similar location to where the Merrion Centre is now, an Odeon "Super Cinema" was planned on Merrion Street and was possibly of the typical Odeon art deco style but was cancelled presumably due to the purchase of the former Paramount cinema and the start of the Second World War.
