= A Man of Action (Dad's Army) =

- Dad's Army episode
- Episode no.: Series 7 Episode 2
- Directed by: David Croft
- Story by: Jimmy Perry and David Croft
- Original air date: 22 November 1974
- Running time: 30 minutes

Episode chronology
← Previous "Everybody's Trucking"	Next → "Gorilla Warfare"

"A Man of Action" is the second episode of the seventh series British comedy series Dad's Army. It was originally transmitted on Friday 22 November 1974.

== Synopsis ==
A parachute mine has ripped up 100 yards of railway track and the gas and water supplies have been cut, the telephone wires are down, and Pike has got his head stuck through the bars of a gate. Mainwaring declares martial law.

== Plot ==
Jones and Pike are out on patrol and whilst recreating a childhood prank, Pike gets his head stuck in the park gates. Mainwaring is in the church hall, conducting an interview and photo session with Mr Cheeseman, a member of the local press who is temporarily joining the platoon to report on its activities. Alerted by Jones, Mainwaring and the others come to rescue Pike. Unable to free him, they lift the gates off their hinges and carry them back to the church hall with Pike still trapped within them. Once there, they secure the gates to the ceiling with rope. Mainwaring also refuses to tell Cheeseman about it to avoid public embarrassment.

Suddenly they hear loud voices coming from the office, where Mainwaring and Wilson discover an emergency meeting by the town elders (namely the Vicar, Warden Hodges, Inspector Baker and Fire Officer Dale) and learn that Walmington-on-Sea is in the grip of a crisis. The railway line has been heavily bombed, leaving the water, telephone and other vital services damaged. The town is, in effect, totally cut off. The town clerk arrives, panicking, and he and the rest of the committee start bickering about what to do. Realising that they are not providing effective leadership, Mainwaring orders his men to fix bayonets and steps in, effectively performing a coup d'etat and putting the town under martial law (a move which, to the shock of Mainwaring, Wilson readily agrees is the best idea, even going so far as to bark out orders like a typical British NCO, instead of in his usual "refined" manner). Hodges implores Inspector Baker to arrest him, but Mainwaring points out that they are up against sixteen fully armed men.

He begins issuing a number of stringent edicts to Wilson, Jones and Frazer to shout from their bicycles, including: all looters being shot, all rumour-mongers, defeatists and those not following military law being imprisoned, and for no baths to be taken or liquor to be sold without a permit, which Frazer supports (but only after Mainwaring gives him responsibility for alcohol permits). Then, gathering his men behind him, Mainwaring marches on the town hall to take control of the town, denying accusations that he is behaving like "the dictator of some South American Banana republic". Pike is still stuck in the gates, and the town clerk wrongly assumes this is some form of harsh punishment by Mainwaring.

Jones has been given responsibility for bath permits, and old Mr. Bluett comes in, enquiring about how the system works. Despite the confident manner he had departed in, Mainwaring returns from his attempt to seize the town hall, indignantly explaining it was shut by the town clerk, and assuring that he will "deal with him in the morning". Frazer and Wilson say that he is behaving like a tyrant, and usurping the power of the land, but Mainwaring again denies it and says that for their own safety, everyone must "knuckle down" and get used to it.

However, when Captain Swan, a tough officer from GHQ arrives to take over command from him, implementing many of the same policies as he had, Mainwaring is himself outraged and the episode ends with him being locked out of his own office, thanks to Frazer telling Swan where the office is. Wilson laughs at Mainwaring's hypocritical nature.

== Cast ==
- Arthur Lowe as Captain Mainwaring
- John Le Mesurier as Sergeant Wilson
- Clive Dunn as Lance Corporal Jones
- John Laurie as Private Frazer
- Arnold Ridley as Private Godfrey
- Ian Lavender as Private Pike
- Bill Pertwee as ARP Warden Hodges
- Talfryn Thomas as Mr Cheeseman
- Frank Williams as The Vicar
- Edward Sinclair as The Verger
- Eric Longworth as the Town Clerk
- Harold Bennett as Mr. Bluett
- Colin Bean as Private Sponge
- Arnold Peters as Fire Officer Dale
- Jay Denyer as Inspector Baker
- Robert Mill as Captain Swan

== Notes ==
1. This is the first episode that introduces Mr Cheeseman as a member of the platoon. He had previously appeared in the episode "My British Buddy" as a reporter from the Eastbourne Gazette who photographed Mainwaring being punched by an American Colonel. In the radio adaptation he is replaced by Jonathan Cecil playing a character named Mr Norris.
