= Central North Dakota Steam Thresher's Reunion =

Coordinates: 47°40′28″N 99°08′39″W

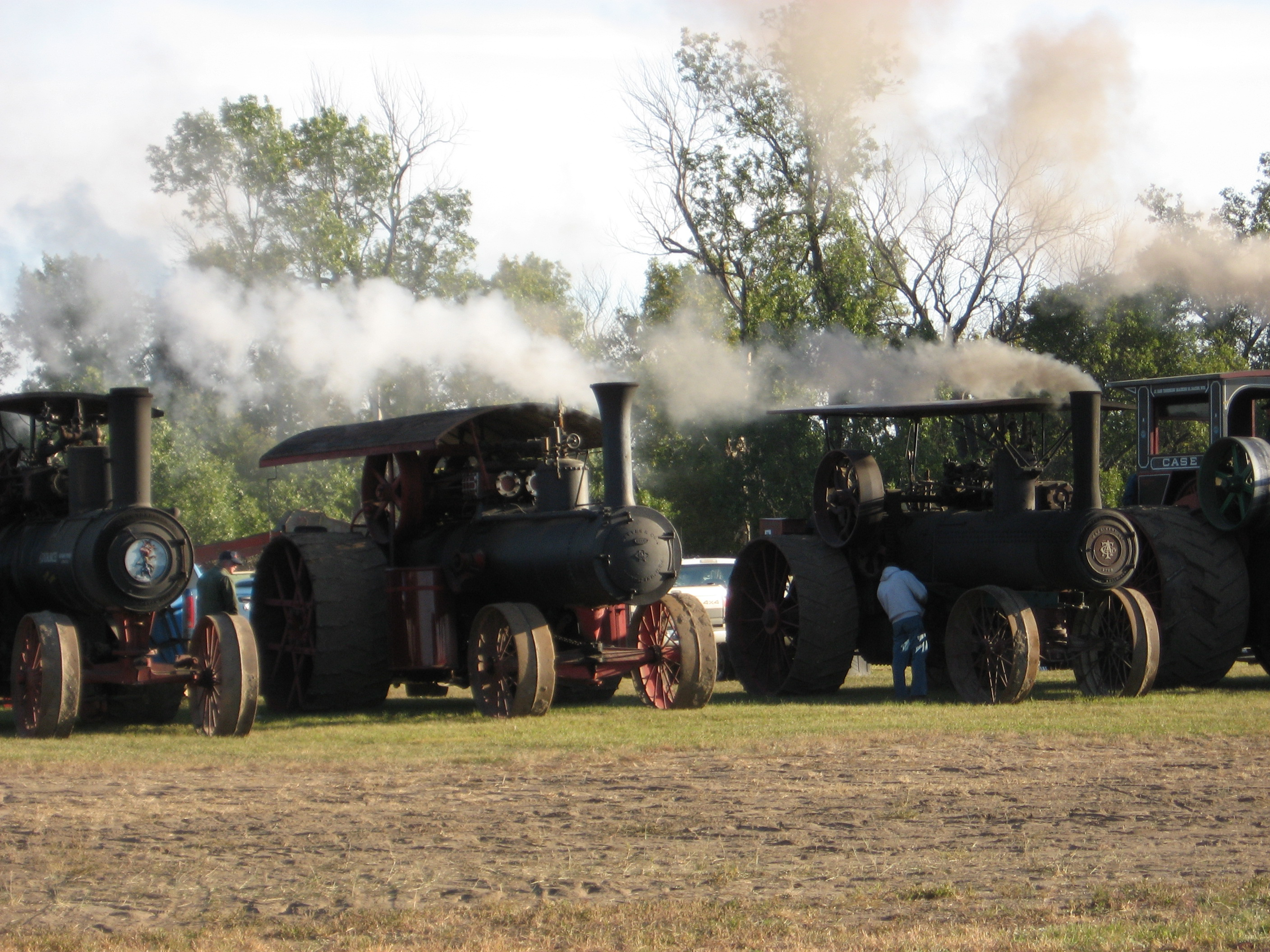
Steam engines on the grounds

The Central North Dakota Steam Thresher's Reunion is an annual event held in New Rockford, North Dakota every third weekend of September. The event is held on the New Rockford Fairground, and began in 1958. It features rare working steam engines, antique implements, and also many antique tractors. Admission also includes a visit to the on-site pioneer village. The festival has run for nearly fifty years and has led to New Rockford self-proclaiming itself "Steam Capitol of North Dakota".

== Events ==
Many events happen during the get-together. Each morning a full breakfast is cooked in an old-fashioned cook-car. There is also a parade of engines which is a narrative parade showcasing many steam engines and tractors, and plowing and threshing demonstrations occur daily. Toy and craft shows are ongoing, as well as historic demonstrations, and a pioneer village. Children compete in the pedal pull competition, and a pioneer church service is held on the last day of the festival. The organization started in 58 but the first show was held in 1959 at the airport north of town.

== See also ==
- List of steam fairs
