= Innishannon Steam and Vintage Rally =

Festival in County Cork, Ireland

Rally steam engines

Innishannon Steam and Vintage Rally is held between Crossbarry and Innishannon, a village on the main Cork–Bandon road (N71) in County Cork, Ireland. The show takes place on a 38-acre site approximately one mile from Innishannon.

== History ==
The rally has been running since June 1998 and was awarded charitable status in 1999. All proceeds from the event go to the Irish Cancer Society. The rally takes place every June Bank Holiday weekend in Innishannon, County Cork. The founding of the event was led by the steam preservationist Tim Nagle of Kinsale.

Over the years, the event has raised funds for the Irish Cancer Society (ICS). In the first year, IR£5000 was handed over to the charity. In the second year, IR£13,500 was donated. In 2000, the amount more than doubled to IR£27,500. Due to the foot-and-mouth disease outbreak in 2001, no rally was held. However, in 2002, €35,500 went to the Irish Cancer Society. In 2003 the event raised €60,000, and in 2005 €65,000 was raised. Up to 2011, the rally had raised over €970,000 for the ICS. The total contribution exceeded the €1 million mark in 2012.

The Innishannon Steam and Vintage replaced the nearby Upton Steam Rally started in 1967/1968 by Ned Foley of Youghal (Steam Roller Engine), Thos (Thomas) Scanlan of Ballyhooley (Overtime Tractor x2) and Brendan O'Connell of Ballincollig (Army Truck) to support the Upton Brothers of Charity. This rally ceased in 1997, due to insurance concerns and costs.

== Objectives ==
This rally was originally created to promote heritage machinery of all classes at work and to provide a venue for vintage enthusiasts to display their machines, as well as allowing the general public to view rare agricultural and mechanical equipment from the past. The exhibits include tractors, threshers, cars, motorbikes, oil and steam engines as well as a working forge. There is also a pet's corner, a cake sale, a number of stands and stalls with art and craft displays, a dog show, sheep dog trials, road rolling, stone crushing, line dancing and a disco. There are also car parking and camping facilities set up in the village. The rally organisers also seek to raise funds for the Irish Cancer Society.

== See also ==
- List of steam fairs
