= Scarborough Fair Collection =

Museum in North Yorkshire, England

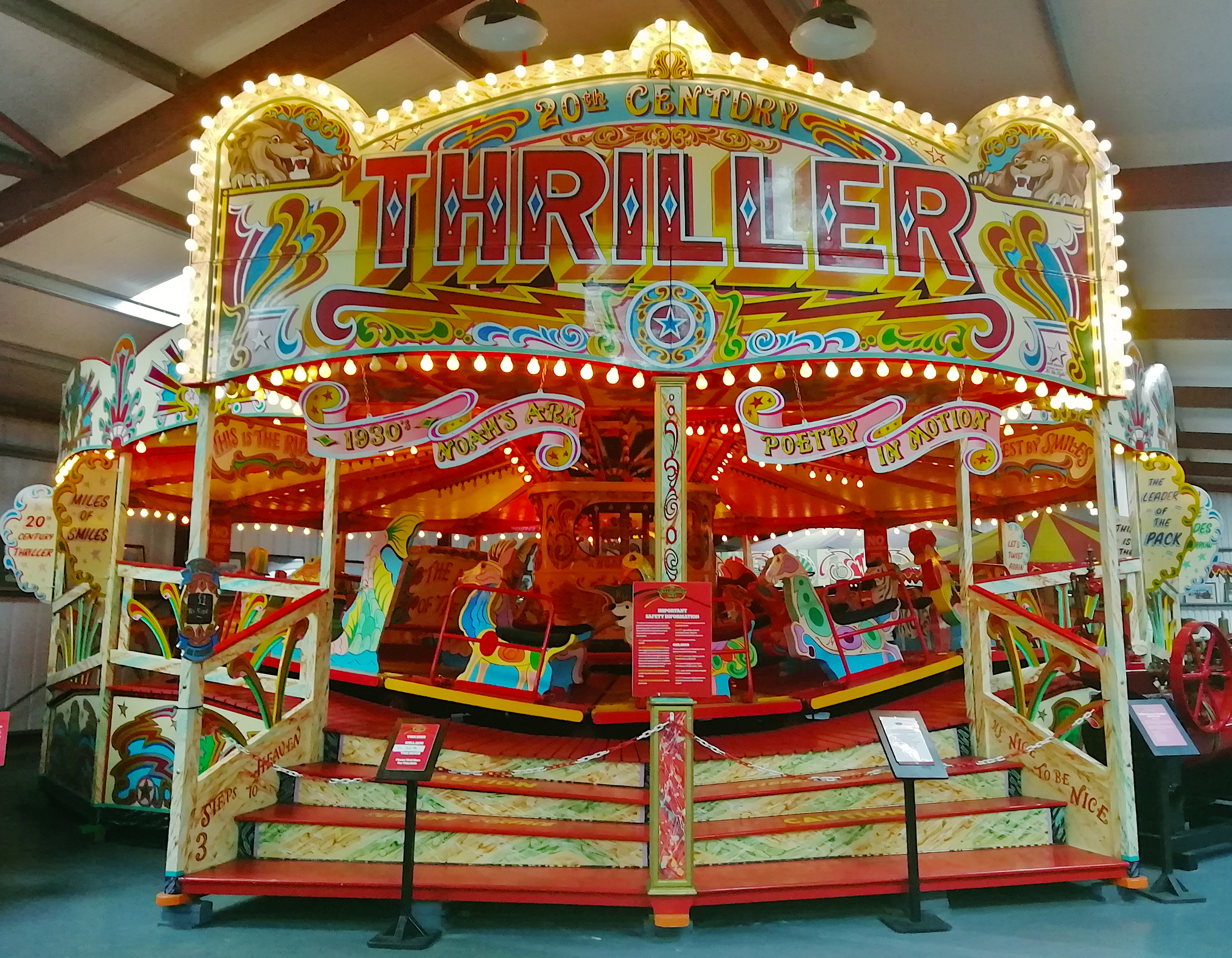
- Noah's Ark Ride 2019
- Established: 2008
- Location: Lebberston, Scarborough, North Yorkshire
- Type: fairground organs, mechanical organs and showman's engines
- President: Graham Atkinson
- Public transit access: Scarborough railway station
- Website: http://www.scarboroughfaircollection.com

The Scarborough Fair Collection is a museum of fairground mechanical organs and showman's engines, located in Scarborough, North Yorkshire, one of the largest collections of its type in Europe.

The museum was founded by local Farmer turned entrepreneur and owner of nearby holiday park), Graham Atkinson, who wanted to both indulge his passion for fairgrounds and entertain his holiday park clients. Starting his collection in the late 1980s, the attraction was occasionally open to holiday park residents and enthusiasts until its formal opening in 2008.

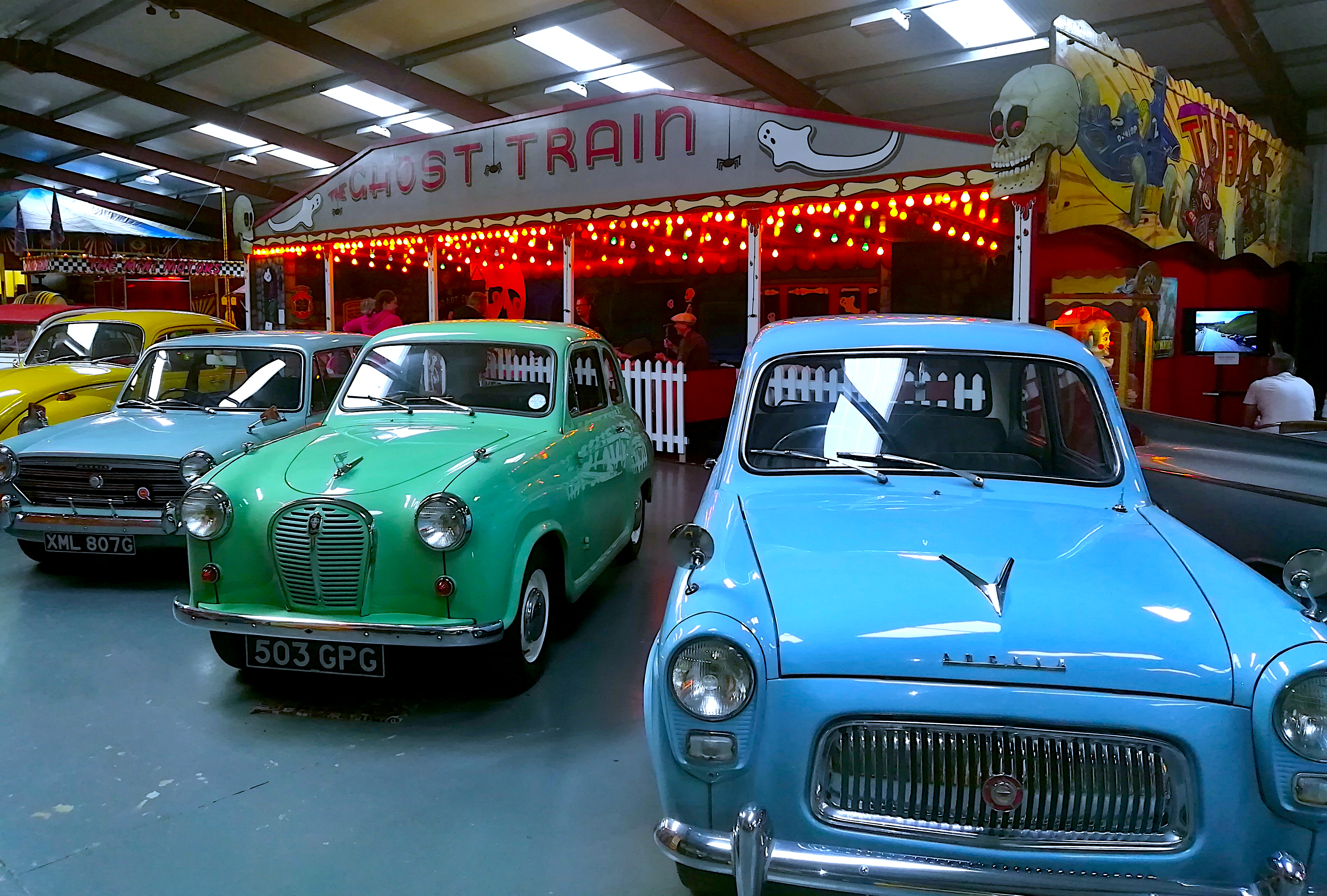
Scarborough Fair Collection Museum Ghost Train and Classic Cars

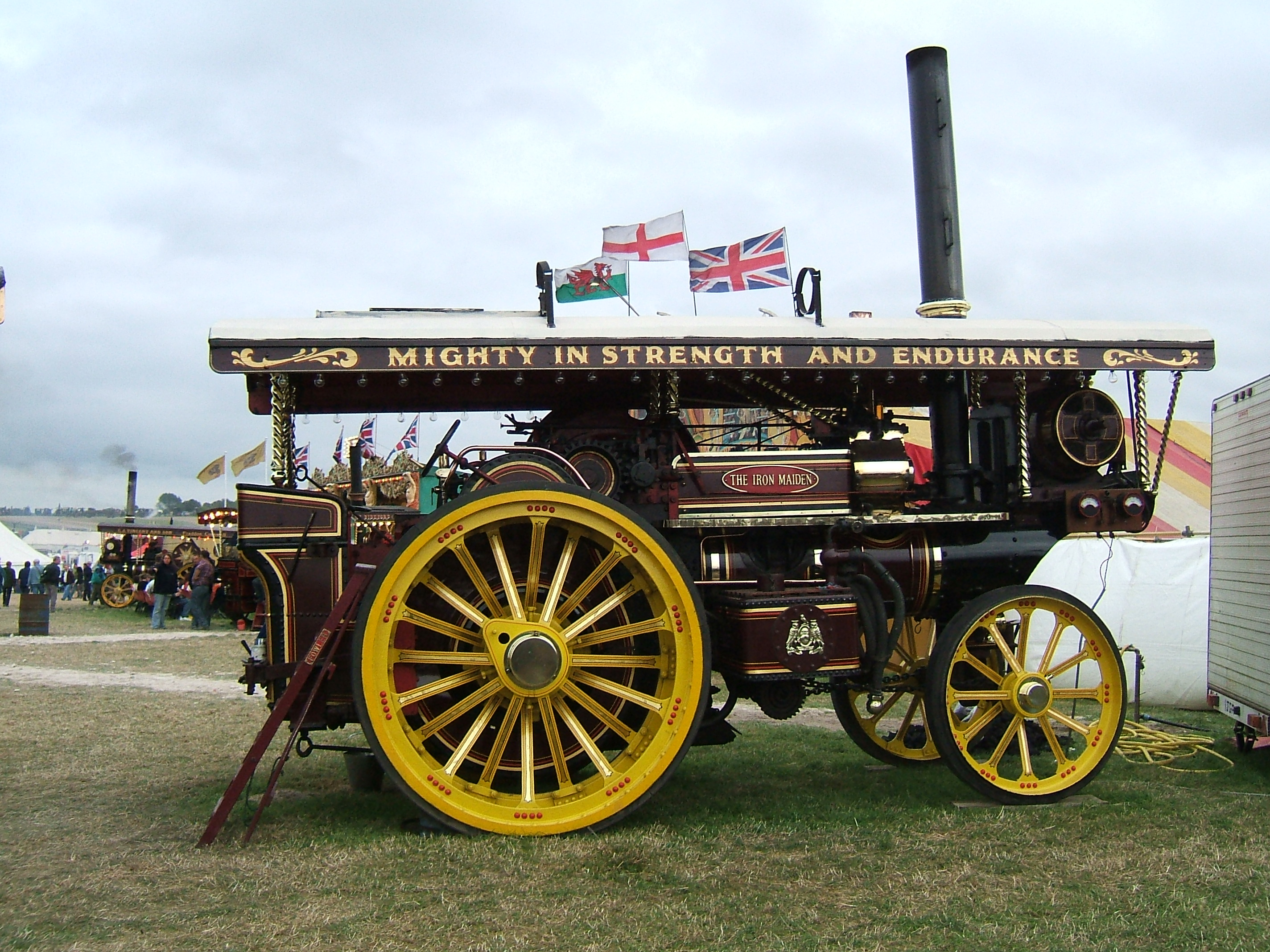
The Iron Maiden at the Great Dorset Steam Fair, 2007

The collection spans vintage cars, miniature vehicles and model railways, but the three cores to the collection are:

- Steam engines: four showman's engines, including The Iron Maiden; a Foden steam wagon; and a Barrows and Co. portable engine
- Fairground rides: including an 1893 gallopers ride, a 1928 rare caterpillar ride, 1933 'Noahs Ark', waltzer, cake walk and dodgem cars
- Mechanical organs: including the 97-key 'Oktoberfest' Gavioli Concert organ, and the 101-key Hooghuys 'Condor' dance organ

There are two theatre organs that feature during open days and weekly Wednesday afternoon tea dances from 13:00. Both instruments are "Mighty" Wurlitzers of 3 manuals and 8 ranks (of pipes) with specifications:

- Granada Theatre, Greenford: English Horn, Tuba, Diapason, Tibia Clausa, Saxophone, Gamba, Gamba Celeste and Flute
- Granada Theatre, Mansfield: Style 'D' Trumpet, Diapason, Tibia Clausa, Clarinet, Violin, Violin Celeste, Vox Humana and Flute

== See also ==
- List of music museums
- Thursford Collection
