= Larry Steinbach =

American football player (1900–1967)

No. 28, 26, 34, 5
- Positions: Tackle, guard

Personal information
- Born: December 23, 1900; New Rockford, North Dakota, U.S.
- Died: June 29, 1967 (aged 66); Jamestown, North Dakota, U.S.
- Listed height: 6 ft 0 in (1.83 m)
- Listed weight: 214 lb (97 kg)

Career information
- High school: St. Thomas (Mendota Heights, Minnesota)
- College: St. Thomas

Career history
- Chicago Bears (1930–1931); Chicago Cardinals (1931–1933); Philadelphia Eagles (1933); St. Louis/Kansas City Blues (1934)

Awards and highlights
- AFL champion (1934)
- Stats at Pro Football Reference

Lawrence Joseph Steinbach (December 23, 1900 – June 29, 1967) was an American professional football player who played four seasons in the National Football League (NFL) with the Chicago Bears, Chicago Cardinals, and Philadelphia Eagles. He played college football at the College of St. Thomas. He was the first NFL player from North Dakota.

== Early life and college ==
Lawrence Joseph Steinbach was born on December 23, 1900, in New Rockford, North Dakota. His parents William and Mary Steinbach had emigrated from Germany in 1882. He was raised on a farm near New Rockford, in Eddy County. Steinbach attended a country school for his elementary education but did not immediately attend high school due to the distance from the family farm. He also endured several illnesses in his youth. At the age of 22, he enrolled at New Rockford High School. Two years afterward, he transferred to St. Thomas Academy in Mendota Heights, Minnesota, and later graduated with a high school diploma.

Despite little high school football experience, Steinbach, who weighed 225 pounds at the time, ended up making the college football team at the College of St. Thomas, now known as the University of St. Thomas. He played four seasons for the St. Thomas Tommies. He worked odd jobs in college until he was awarded a scholarship. He was named All-State his senior year in 1929 and helped the team win the conference title that year.

== Pro football career ==
Steinbach played in 11 games, starting nine, for the Chicago Bears of the National Football League (NFL) in 1930. He was the first NFL player from North Dakota. During the NFL offseason, he played for a barnstorming team that included Pro Football Hall of Famers Bronko Nagurski and Ernie Nevers. Steinbach appeared in four games, starting three, for the Bears in 1931.

After Steinbach's friend, Ernie Nevers, became the head coach of the Chicago Cardinals, the team acquired Steinbach during midseason in 1931. He finished the 1931 season by playing in three games (two starts) for the Cardinals. Steinbach played in seven games, starting one, for the Cardinals in 1932. He appeared in one game for Chicago in 1933.

On November 7, 1933, the Philadelphia Eagles, who were playing their first season, purchased Steinbach from the Cardinals. He finished the 1933 season by playing in three games for the Eagles and catching one pass for five yards.

In 1934, Steinbach started all eight games for the St. Louis/Kansas City Blues of the American Football League (AFL). The Blues finished in first place in the AFL with a 7–0–1 record. He suffered no injuries during his NFL career but was later noted as stating, in regards to the playing conditions of the time, "You just didn't dare get injured because you'd be released from the team with no income."

== Later life ==
After his football career, Steinbach returned to the family grain and cattle farm in New Rockford, prospering and expanding it to 3,400 acres (1,400 ha). After learning of Steinbach's commercial success, Bears owner George Halas asked him to help start an NFL team in Los Angeles, but he declined. Years later, a friend of Steinbach's attempted to persuade him to buy the Chicago Cardinals but Steinbach again declined.

Steinbach died in Jamestown, North Dakota, on June 29, 1967, after a two-week illness. He was buried at the Calvary Cemetery in Jamestown. At the time of his death, he was reported as being a millionaire. In 1981, football historian and North Dakota resident Tony Cusher said that Steinbach "was a good – although not great – player. Had he begun his NFL career at an earlier age and played for eight or 10 years, he no doubt would have achieved a bigger reputation."
