= New Rockford, North Dakota =

- City
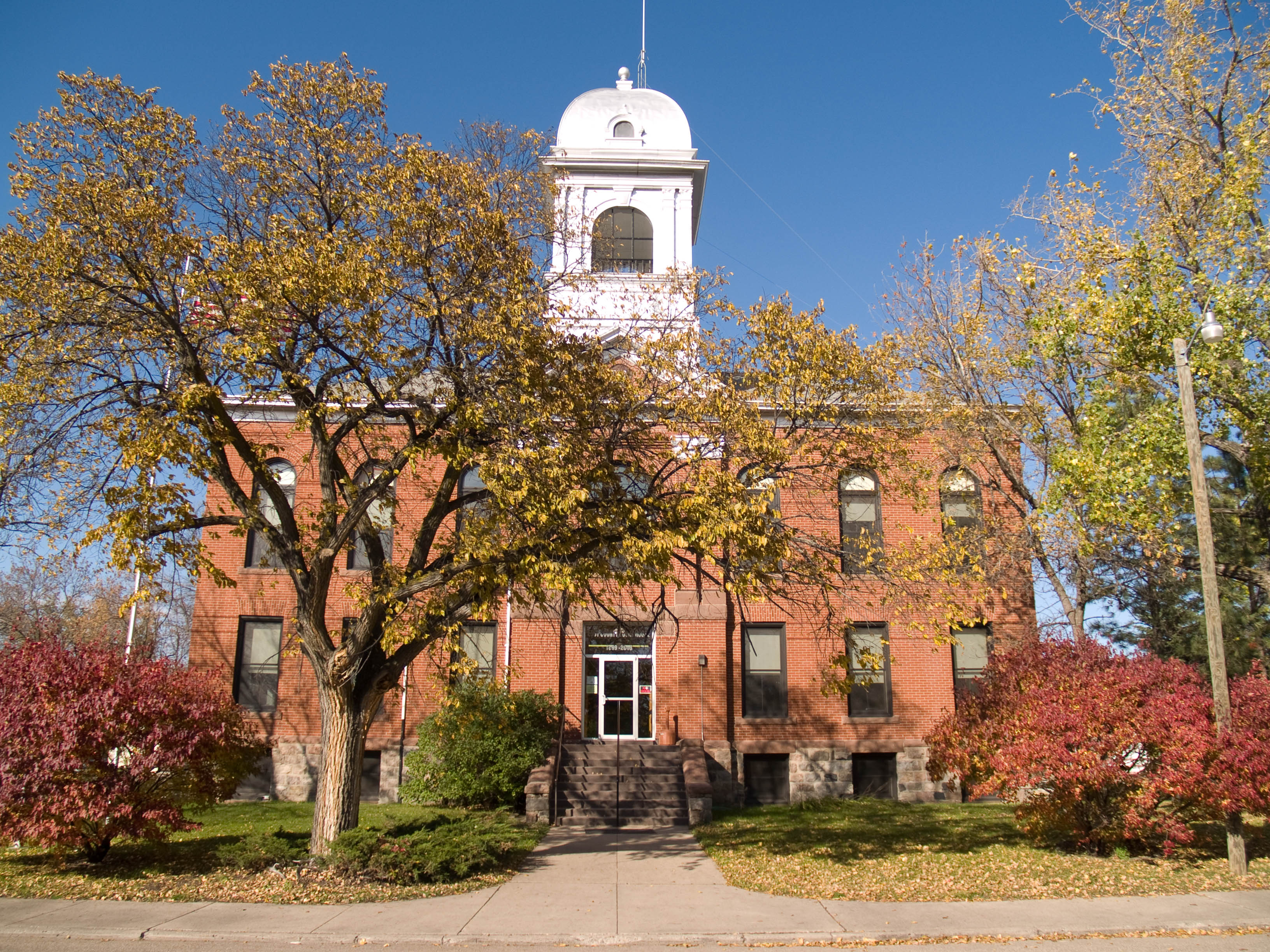
- Eddy County Courthouse in New Rockford

- Location of New Rockford, North Dakota
- Coordinates: 47°40′47″N 99°08′15″W
- Country: United States
- State: North Dakota
- County: Eddy
- Founded: 1883

Government
  - City Auditor: Andrew Presnell

Area
  - Total: 1.75 sq mi (4.53 km^{2})
  - Land: 1.72 sq mi (4.45 km^{2})
  - Water: 0.031 sq mi (0.08 km^{2})
- Elevation: 1,532 ft (467 m)

Population (2020)
  - Total: 1,361
  - Estimate (2022): 1,339
  - Density: 792.1/sq mi (305.82/km^{2})
- Time zone: UTC-6 (Central (CST))
  - Summer (DST): UTC-5 (CDT)
- ZIP code: 58356
- Area code: 701
- FIPS code: 38-56620
- GNIS feature ID: 1036182
- Highways: US 281, ND 15
- Website: cityofnewrockford.gov

New Rockford is a city in Eddy County, North Dakota, United States. It is the county seat of Eddy County. The population was 1,361 at the 2020 census. New Rockford was founded in 1883.

== History ==
New Rockford was founded in 1883, when the Northern Pacific Railway arrived in the area.

In 1915, residents mounted a challenge to have the state capital relocated from Bismarck to New Rockford. This did not succeed, leaving Bismarck the capital.

== Geography ==
According to the United States Census Bureau, the city has an area of 1.54 square miles (3.99 km^{2}), of which 1.51 square miles (3.91 km^{2}) is land and 0.03 square miles (0.08 km^{2}) is water. New Rockford's zip code is 58356.

== Demographics ==
Historical population
Census	Pop.	Note	%±
1920	2,111		—
1930	2,195		4.0%
1940	2,017		−8.1%
1950	2,185		8.3%
1960	2,177		−0.4%
1970	1,969		−9.6%
1980	1,791		−9.0%
1990	1,604		−10.4%
2000	1,463		−8.8%
2010	1,391		−4.9%
2020	1,361		−2.2%
2023 (est.)	1,339		−1.6%
U.S. Decennial Census; 2020 Census

=== 2010 census ===
As of the census of 2010, there were 1,391 people, 628 households, and 363 families living in the city. The population density was 921.2 inhabitants per square mile (355.7/km^{2}). There were 750 housing units at an average density of 496.7 per square mile (191.8/km^{2}). The racial makeup of the city was 95.7% White, 0.1% African American, 1.7% Native American, 0.4% Asian, 0.1% Pacific Islander, 0.9% from other races, and 1.2% from two or more races. Hispanic or Latino people of any race were 2.9%.

Of the 628 households 24.7% had children under the age of 18 living with them, 44.9% were married couples living together, 9.4% had a female householder with no husband present, 3.5% had a male householder with no wife present, and 42.2% were non-families. 38.4% of households were one person and 22% were one person aged 65 or older. The average household size was 2.08 and the average family size was 2.74.

The median age was 50.2 years. 20.8% of residents were under the age of 18; 4.8% were between the ages of 18 and 24; 18.3% were from 25 to 44; 28.8% were from 45 to 64; and 27.2% were 65 or older. The gender makeup of the city was 46.2% male and 53.8% female.

=== 2000 census ===
As of the census of 2000, there were 1,463 people, 651 households, and 378 families living in the city. The population density was 970.7 inhabitants per square mile (374.8/km^{2}). There were 778 housing units at an average density of 516.2 per square mile (199.3/km^{2}). The racial makeup of the city was 98.02% White, 0.14% African American, 1.50% Native American, 0.14% from other races, and 0.21% from two or more races. Hispanic or Latino people of any race were 0.55% of the population.

Of the 651 households 24.7% had children under the age of 18 living with them, 49.8% were married couples living together, 6.1% had a female householder with no husband present, and 41.8% were non-families. 39.3% of households were one person and 24.7% were one person aged 65 or older. The average household size was 2.13 and the average family size was 2.84.

The age distribution was 20.8% under the age of 18, 6.4% from 18 to 24, 21.3% from 25 to 44, 21.9% from 45 to 64, and 29.7% 65 or older. The median age was 46 years. For every 100 females, there were 84.5 males. For every 100 females age 18 and over, there were 80.0 males.

The median household income was $28,042 and the median family income was $43,438. Males had a median income of $26,080 versus $19,219 for females. The per capita income for the city was $16,444. About 6.2% of families and 9.0% of the population were below the poverty line, including 8.3% of those under age 18 and 15.3% of those age 65 or over.

== Events ==
- The annual Central North Dakota Steam Thresher's Reunion is one of New Rockford's main annual events. It is held the third weekend of September.
- The Opera House hosts theatre productions year round.

== Notable people ==
- James Buchli, U.S. Marine, former NASA astronaut
- Ole H. Olson, 18th governor of North Dakota
- Larry Steinbach, football player

== Education ==
New Rockford is served by New Rockford-Sheyenne Public School.

== Climate ==
This climatic region is typified by large seasonal temperature differences, with warm to hot (and often humid) summers and cold (sometimes severely cold) winters. According to the Köppen Climate Classification system, New Rockford has a humid continental climate, abbreviated "Dfb" on climate maps.

== Newspaper ==
The weekly New Rockford Transcript is the town's official newspaper of record.
