= Cadeby, Leicestershire =

Village and civil parish in England

Coordinates: 52.617620°N 1.373226°W

Cadeby
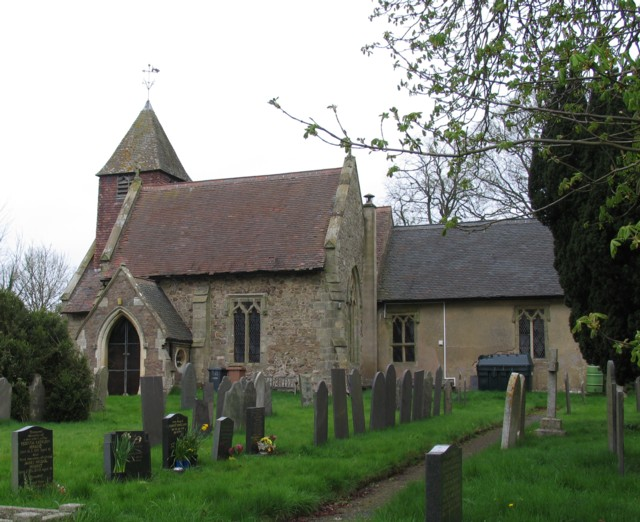
- All Saints Church, Cadeby

- Location within Leicestershire
- Population: 169 (2011)
- OS grid reference: SK4202
- Shire county: Leicestershire
- Region: East Midlands
- Country: England
- Sovereign state: United Kingdom
- Post town: Nuneaton
- Postcode district: CV13
- Police: Leicestershire
- Fire: Leicestershire
- Ambulance: East Midlands
- UK Parliament: Hinckley and Bosworth

Cadeby (pronounced /ˈkeɪdbi/ KAYD-bee) is a village and civil parish in the Hinckley and Bosworth district of Leicestershire, England, about 6 miles north of Hinckley, close to Newbold Verdon and Market Bosworth. According to the 2001 census it had a population of 177, reducing to 169 at the 2011 census.

The village's name means 'farm/settlement of Kati' or 'farm/settlement belonging to the boys'.

== Cadeby Light Railway ==
Until 2005, Cadeby Rectory garden was home to the Cadeby Light Railway. This was a short narrow gauge line and collection of railway artifacts belonging to the late Rev. Teddy Boston, a friend of the Rev W Awdry. The railway is closed and was dismantled in 2006.

== Cadeby Steam & Country Fayre ==
Market Bosworth Steam Rally, also known as the Cadeby Steam & Country Fayre, was founded in 1964 by the Rev Teddy Boston, both as an alternative to transporting his steam roller to distant rallies by low-loader, and as a means to raise funds for his parish church. The rally continued annually for 44 years, held on the second weekend in August; the last rally was held in 2008.

== See also ==
- List of steam fairs
