= Edwin Boston =

Church of England clergyman and steam enthusiast

Edwin Richard Boston (20 August 1924 – 1 April 1986), known as Teddy Boston, was a Church of England clergyman and author. He built a narrow gauge railway in the grounds of his Rectory at Cadeby, Leicestershire, and was immortalised as the "Fat Clergyman" in The Railway Series children's books by the Rev. W. Awdry.

== Education ==
Boston was educated at Gresham's School, Holt, and Jesus College, Cambridge, before training for the ministry of the Church of England at Lincoln Theological College.

== Career ==
From 1949, Boston served as curate of Wisbech, Cambridgeshire. He became Rector of Cadeby and Vicar of Sutton Cheney, both in Leicestershire, in 1960, remaining in post until his death in 1986. At the 2001 census, Cadeby reported 177 inhabitants, Sutton Cheney 545.

== Steam enthusiast ==
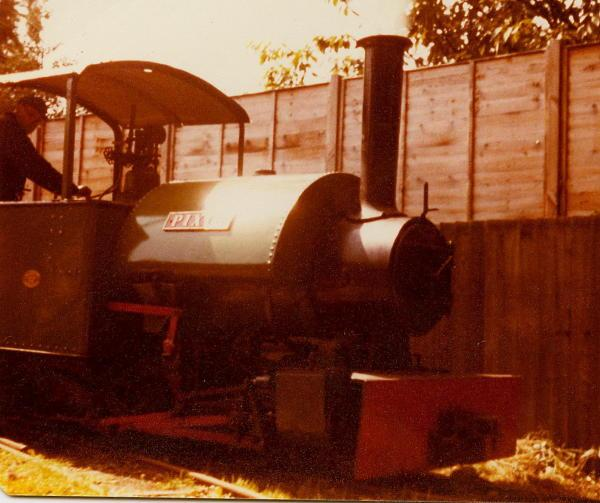
Boston's Bagnall locomotive Pixie in 1981

In the words of Peter Scott, "The story of the Cadeby Light Railway is really the story of one man - 'Teddy' Boston".

In May 1962, Boston bought a Bagnall saddle tank locomotive number 2090, named 'Pixie', and set about building a light railway in the grounds of the Rectory at Cadeby. U-shaped, with a total length of 110 yards, the line opened on 7 April 1963 and carried its first passengers a month later.

In 1967, Boston bought from Lilleshall Hall another narrow gauge locomotive, number 1695, which was an engine he had seen working a light railway at Lilleshall when he was young. After standing idle for twenty-seven years, it had been reported as 'rediscovered' in the Narrow Gauge News and was moved to Cadeby on 6 May 1967. There, 1695 was renamed 'The Terror', in reference to Psalm 91, "The Terror that walketh in darkness", as the engine was so hard to start that it could be dark before it was going.

Situated in the grounds at Cadeby was a large wooden shed which housed a very extensive OO gauge model railway depicting the pre-war Great Western Railway. It also contained a separate, smaller narrow gauge layout, a 4 mm scale, 12 mm gauge line based on the Isle of Man Railway. Latterly Boston also owned a canal narrowboat which had an N gauge model railway on board, narrow boats being an interest of his wife, Audrey.

He was a close friend of the Rev. W. V. Awdry, creator of Thomas the Tank Engine, a kindred spirit with whom he shared many railway holidays. In Small Railway Engines (1967), Awdry relies on a trip the two made together to the Ravenglass and Eskdale Railway, and they appear in the book as 'the Fat Clergyman' (Boston) and 'the Thin Clergyman' (Awdry). In 2017, 'the Fat Clergyman' was rendered in CGI for Thomas and Friends' twentieth series. He and 'the Thin Clergyman' appeared in the adaptation of Tit for Tat. They also appeared together in Series 21's Confused Coaches. 'The Fat Clergyman' also made cameos in The Great Race and Big World! Big Adventures!

Of his visits to Cadeby, Awdry wrote:

We would go on shopping expeditions to Market Bosworth, using a steam-roller or traction-engine by way of transport, parking, as a matter of course, in the town centre.

Boston's love of railways and collection of steam locomotives and rolling stock are celebrated in Susanna Johnston and Tim Beddow's book Collecting: The Passionate Pastime, together with Lady Diana Cooper's love of unicorns.

== Market Bosworth Steam Rally ==
Boston liked to attend steam rallies, but found transporting heavy equipment expensive, and in 1963 he founded a new annual 'Market Bosworth Steam Rally'. He wrote:

The idea then sprang to mind that if we could not get to a rally, why could a rally not come to us? Therefore in 1963 the Market Bosworth Steam Engine Rally was conceived and born, becoming a regular two-day annual event held at Cadeby in August. This has proved a great success and also a considerable help with parish funds.

== At home ==
Boston has been described as "a short, round, jolly man, much given to Anglo-Saxon language in times of stress, such as a close run race with his traction engine Fiery Elias". In his foreword to Font to Footplate, W. V. Awdry wrote: "In thinking of our Teddy it is important to realise that despite the impression that this book may seem to give, he was a Parish Priest first and a steam enthusiast second. He never forced religion on anyone; but his sincere faith and devotion was there for all to see, coupled with his impish sense of humour."

Grass grew in the gutters of the Rectory, which was full of Boston's railway collections. The walls were covered with shelves bearing model railway locomotives and rolling stock. In every room, the collection overflowed onto the floor, and it continued up the stairs, including a comprehensive collection of railway films on celluloid.

When Boston died, he left a widow, Audrey, who was still living in 2015. She shared her husband's enthusiasm for steam and for many years continued to co-organize the Market Bosworth Steam Rally.

== Publications ==
- Boston, Rev. E. R., Rails Round the Rectory - The story of the Cadeby Light Railway (Loughborough: The Book House, 1973) ISBN 0-902520-03-2.
- Boston, Rev. E. R., Font to Footplate (Line One Publishing, 1986) ISBN 0-907036-23-6
