= Melbourne Steam Traction Engine Club =

Coordinates: 37.904807°S 145.21062°E

- Abbreviation: MSTEC
- Formation: 1963
- Type: Not for Profit
- Legal status: Incorporated
- Purpose: Steam and industrial heritage preservation
- Headquarters: 1200 Ferntree Gully Road
- Location: Scoresby, Victoria
- President: Dennis Sells
- Main organ: committee
- Staff: 0
- Volunteers: 160+
- Website: http://www.melbournesteam.com.au

The Melbourne Steam Traction Engine Club (MSTEC) is a volunteer club in Scoresby, Victoria, Australia, dedicated to the preservation, conservation, and restoration of industrial heritage, particularly machinery. The club's activities take place on the site of the National Steam Centre where there is a collection of mobile steam, stationary steam engines, stationary IC engines, diesel engines, diesel generator sets, tractors and other mobile machinery. There is also a library, an archive, and a miniature railway that circles the site.

== History ==
Formed in 1963, the Melbourne Steam Traction Engine Club has been at its present 6½ hectare site in Scoresby, Victoria since 1986. Previously it was located on land leased from Beamish Heavy Haulage at Wantirna. The site was originally a depot used for the tunnelling of the main trunk sewer and was an empty lot when the club took it over. Since occupation, the site has been developed with landscaping, tree planting, installation of the rail track, construction of the 9 sheds and toilet block and a man-made lake.

== National Steam Centre display ==
The engines on display at the National Steam Centre represent many years of collection and restoration efforts by the members. In addition to the engines owned by the club, several members' privately owned engines are kept at the centre. A particular effort has gone in to ensure Australian steam and industrial heritage is preserved in Australia.

== Run days and miniature railway ==
Many of the engines on display are operated on the last Sunday of each month. This opportunity allows visitors to see many of the steam and diesel stationary engines running, including several steam traction engines, steam rollers and tractors operating in the central arena.

The miniature railway at the site operates every Sunday from 11 am to 4 pm, except during inclement weather and the Christmas-New Year break. The 1km track encircles the site, and takes in a lake, grazing cattle, and museum exhibits. While only one train runs at a time, the last Sunday of each month may feature a steam locomotive, with a diesel engine on other Sundays. The grounds offer shaded picnic areas and a gas barbecue, and while general entry is free, special events may have an entrance fee.

== Annual rally ==
The club's annual rally, known as the Scoresby Steamfest is held on the long weekend in March each year when many of the restored engines are exhibited and operated. Particular emphasis is placed on exhibiting engines as they were intended to be used, driving industrial or agricultural implements for example. Exhibits from many other associated clubs and historic machinery associations are also displayed and operated, as well as that from private collectors and enthusiasts. More recently, exhibits at the Scoresby Steamfest have grown to encompass many other hobbies and collections, including model and experimental engineering and crafting, collections of antique engineering artefacts and tools, oil lamps, mechanical music, and other items from bygone eras.

== See also ==
- List of steam fairs
