= Thursford =

Village in Norfolk, England

Coordinates: 52.86°N 0.96°E

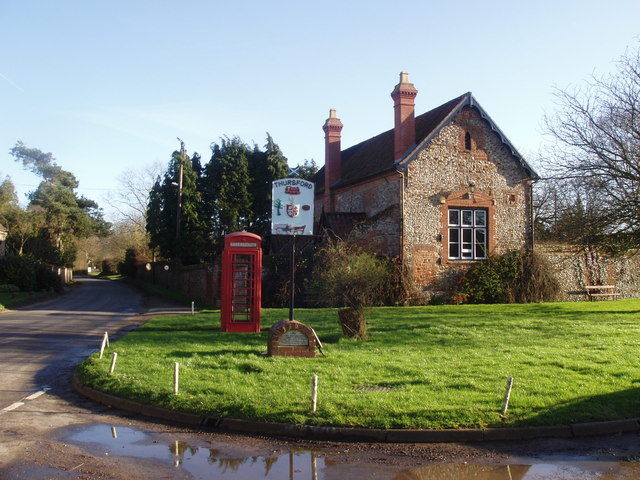
- Thursford village green

- Location within Norfolk
- Area: 6.02 km^{2} (2.32 sq mi)
- Population: 205 (2011 census)
  - Density: 34/km^{2} (88/sq mi)
- OS grid reference: TF979344
  - London: 137
- Civil parish: Thursford
- District: North Norfolk
- Shire county: Norfolk
- Region: East
- Country: England
- Sovereign state: United Kingdom
- Post town: FAKENHAM
- Postcode district: NR21
- Dialling code: 01328
- Police: Norfolk
- Fire: Norfolk
- Ambulance: East of England
- UK Parliament: North Norfolk

Thursford is a village and civil parish in the county of Norfolk, eastern England. The village is 16.3 miles southwest of Cromer, 24.5 miles northwest of Norwich and 121 miles northeast of London.

The village lies 6.9 miles northwest of the nearby town of Fakenham. The nearest railway station is at Sheringham for the Bittern Line which runs between Sheringham, Cromer and Norwich. The nearest airport is Norwich International Airport. The village once had its own Thursford railway station which is now closed. It is a proposed stop on the Norfolk Orbital Railway. The village's name means 'Giant ford' or 'demon ford'.

Thursford parish church is dedicated to St Andrew and has some fine examples of Victorian stained glass windows. The church was rebuilt in the early 1860s with money given by the Chad family who lived in the nearby Thursford Hall.

== Thursford Collection ==
Thursford is the home of the Thursford Collection, which is an assortment of steam engines and fairground organs housed in a museum. The collection was founded by a local man, George Cushing, and what began as a hobby turned into one of the world's most important steam and fairground museums. The collection includes a Mighty Wurlitzer theatre organ, which is the fourth largest in Europe and has a total of 1,339 pipes. There is also a 19th-century gondola roundabout which was built in the Norfolk factory of Frederick Savage. The ride is decorated with carved heads depicting Queen Victoria and her family, including the German Kaiser Wilhelm II.

The collection and museum is also famous for its popular summer and winter musical shows. The annual Christmas "Spectaculars" attract coachloads of devotees from around the country and must be booked months in advance.

One of the organs in the collection, a Wellershaus, was seen and heard in the Dad's Army television episode Everybody's Trucking, which originally aired on 15 November 1974.

== Governance and religion ==
For local government purposes, Thursford civil parish falls under the North Norfolk District Council ward of Priory, whose present district councillor is Richard Kershaw of the Liberal Democrats, and the Norfolk County Council division of Melton Constable, whose present county councillor is Steffan Aquarone, also of the Liberal Democrats. In the UK Parliament, between 2010 and 2024 it fell under the Broadland parliamentary constituency; before this it was for many years in the North Norfolk constituency until boundary changes in 2010. However, following boundary changes in 2024 the village falls back under the North Norfolk parliamentary constituency. The MP since 2024 is Steffan Aquarone of the Liberal Democrats, who is also the local county councillor.

In the Church of England, Thursford falls under the province of Canterbury, the diocese of Norwich, the archdeaconry of Lynn, and the deanery of Burnham and Walsingham.
