= New Rockford Transcript =

Newspaper in New Rockford, North Dakota

- Type: Weekly newspaper
- Owner: Transcript Publishing
- Founder(s): J.W. Hays; C.E. Hoge
- Publisher: Amy Wobbema
- Founded: 1883
- Language: English
- Headquarters: 817 Central Ave. New Rockford, ND 58356
- Website: newrockfordtranscript.com

New Rockford Transcript is a local newspaper based in New Rockford, North Dakota, in the United States.

== History ==
On September 21, 1883, J.W. Hays and C.E. Hoge published the first edition of the New Rockford Transcript. That November, Hoge sold out to Newt O. Fanning. In June 1886, Capt. W.G. Dunn, a veteran of the American Civil War, bought the paper from Hays. At that time Charles J. Maddux became his assistant. In June 1889, Maddux bought out Dunn.

In 1898, A.C. "Fred" Olsen became editor, and in 1903 bought out Maddux. In April 1954, A.C. Olsen suffered a stroke, and at that time retired. Management of the Transcript was handed over to his son Harve E. Olsen. In November 1958, A.C. Olsen died at age 82.

In January 1961, H.E. Olsen sold the Transcript to brothers Edward W. Doherty and Howard F. Doherty. In 1968, E. W. Doherty ran for governor. While he was endorsed by Republican party, he lost in the primary election to Robert P. McCarney. However, he did go on to serve in the state senate and managed several election campaigns. In June 1969, the Doherty brothers bought the Cavalier County Republican.

In 1981, H.F. Doherty retired. In 1985, E. W. Doherty retired. At that time husband-and-wife Craig and Bonne Vogit acquired the Transcript. In 1987, the couple also acquired The Enderlin Independent. In 1998, H.F. Doherty was inducted into the North Dakota Newspaper Hall of Fame, followed in 1999 by his brother E.W. Doherty. In 2015, the paper's building was destroyed by an electrical fire, but staff moved into a temporary space and the publication continued.
