= Everybody's Trucking =

- Dad's Army episode
- Episode no.: Series 7 Episode 1
- Directed by: David Croft
- Story by: Jimmy Perry and David Croft
- Original air date: 15 November 1974
- Running time: 30 minutes

Episode chronology
← Previous "The Recruit"	Next → "A Man of Action"

"Everybody's Trucking" is the first episode of the seventh series of the British television sitcom Dad's Army. It was originally transmitted on 15 November 1974.

== Synopsis ==
Mainwaring's platoon have to signpost the route for a military convoy passing through the area. However, an abandoned steam roller and fairground organ trailer are blocking the route, which threatens to plunge the convoy into chaos.

== Plot ==
In the church hall yard, Jones is showing off his newly restored butchers' van to the platoon. Mainwaring arrives with some very important news: three battalions of regular troops are to move into the Walmington and Eastgate areas as part of the divisional scheme, and as the signposts have been removed, the platoon have been asked to signpost the route to allow the convoys to pass through safely. While explaining the operation, Mainwaring damages Jones' van, by drawing on its side (ruining the paintwork) and knocking off part of the running board on the driver's side, as well as later damaging the horn.

The operation goes without further hitches until the men are collected and Mainwaring orders Jones to drive them back to the church hall. En route, they find the road blocked by an abandoned steam roller and fairground organ trailer, and a note from its driver reveals that he has gone to get some coal. Rather than wait for him to return, Mainwaring decides to drive around the vehicles. Whilst doing so, Jones's van gets stuck in the mud and before long it is joined by Hodges' van, his motorbike and side-car (driven by the Verger, who is taking Mrs Fox to pick bluebells, much to the chagrin of Jones and the Verger's wife) and a coach carrying the Vicar, the Verger's wife and pensioners on a day trip (who take the opportunity to dance to the organ when Pike, who is trying to move the trailer, accidentally starts it up after unhitching it from the steam roller). With time running out, it falls to Godfrey's Auntie Elsie to save the day and divert the convoy.

== Cast ==
- Arthur Lowe as Captain Mainwaring
- John Le Mesurier as Sergeant Wilson
- Clive Dunn as Lance Corporal Jones
- John Laurie as Private Frazer
- Arnold Ridley as Private Godfrey
- Ian Lavender as Private Pike
- Bill Pertwee as ARP Warden Hodges
- Edward Sinclair as The Verger
- Frank Williams as The Vicar
- Pamela Cundell as Mrs Fox
- Harold Bennett as Mr Blewett
- Olive Mercer as Mrs Yeatman
- Felix Bowness as The Coach Driver
- Colin Bean as Private Sponge

== Notes ==
1. This episode was mainly shot on location in the Stanford Battle Area in Norfolk, with the exception of the first scene in the church hall yard, which was shot at the then BBC Television Centre in West London.
2. According to Dad's Army: The Story of a Television Legend, the bird song heard in the episode is in fact the whistling of actor Felix Bowness, who played the coach driver.
3. The fairground organ which plays the Can-Can in this episode was built by the German firm of Wellershaus, and can be seen and heard at the Thursford Collection in Norfolk.
4. This is the first series not to feature James Beck (who played Private Walker in the previous six series) in the closing credits, due to Beck's sudden death in 1973 and Walker being written out of the show in the episode "The Recruit".
5. When this episode was adapted for radio, Harold Snoad and Michael Knowles made significant changes to the script, the most significant being that rather than being held up by a steam roller, the platoon is held up by a circus truck containing an elephant, hence the retitling as "A Jumbo-Sized Problem".
