= Thursford Collection =

Steam museum in Norfolk, England

Coordinates: 52.8712°N 0.9403°E

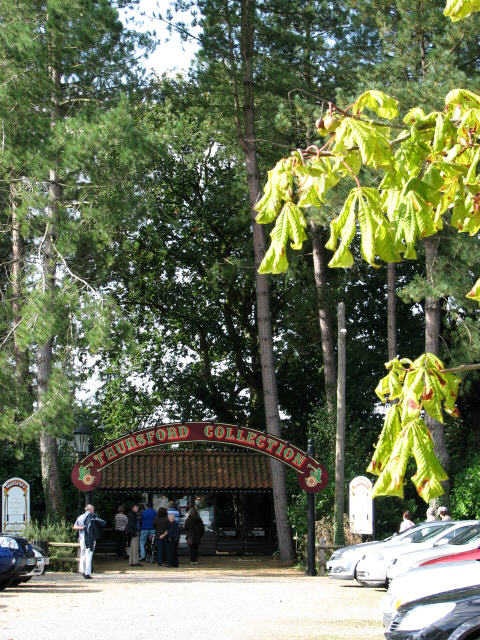

- Location within Norfolk
- Established: 1970s
- Location: Thursford, Norfolk, England
- Type: Steam power, entertainment and farming heritage
- Visitors: 250,000
- Website: Thursford Collection

The Thursford Collection is a museum located in Thursford, Norfolk. Founded by local man, the late George Cushing, it is now known for the scale of its collection of steam engines, mechanical organs and fairground rides, and its annual Christmas spectacular show, which draws over 100,000 people to the Norfolk countryside.

The Thursford Collection is a registered charity under English law.

== George Cushing ==
George Thomas Henry Cushing MBE was born at Thursford on 25 March 1904, the son of a farm labourer. After leaving school aged 12, he became a farmhand, but had developed a childhood fascination with steam engines. In 1920 he travelled to the King's Lynn Mart, and got a job driving a steam roller. Having bought a 1913 Aveling and Porter roller from the local district council with savings of £225, Cushing set up his own sub-contracting business, which had expanded to 15 steam rollers and a steam wagon by World War II.

== Laurel Farm ==
By the late 1930s, steam was on the wane from commercial usage as diesel lorries became more popular. To Cushing, it was "as though the crown jewels were being sold for scrap", and he began to buy up redundant steam engines, storing and then restoring them at Laurel Farm in Thursford, where he had worked as a boy and now owned. This was also where he raised his own family of three boys with his wife Minnie.

== Thursford Museum ==
As Cushing's collection grew, more enthusiasts travelled to Thursford to help restore and then view his collection. Thus, in the early 1970s Cushing opened his museum in what was then a series of old farm sheds, and would personally tour the audience between exhibits, most often dressed in a countryman's flat cap, tweed jacket and muffler over baggy jumper, trousers and gumboots. He would then shake each visitor's hand, and ask departing guests with a blunt "Did yer loik it, then?"

The original museum had limited opening times, but Cushing expanded the attraction to include a gift shop and tea rooms, and opened seven days a week during the summer season. In 1982 he co-wrote, with Ian Starsmore, Steam at Thursford. For the scale of his efforts in saving much of Britain's steam heritage, Cushing was appointed an MBE in 1989.

== Thursford Collection ==
In 1976, Cushing realised his collection could be subject to death duties when he died, and so set up the Thursford Collection as a trust-endowed charity which took effect in January 1977. Now run by George's youngest son John, the Thursford Collection attracts 170,000 visitors a year. George Cushing died on 26 February 2003, aged 98.

The collection today includes a Mighty Wurlitzer which is the fourth-largest in Europe, and has a total of 1,339 pipes. The organ was rescued from the Paramount Theatre / Odeon Cinema Leeds. There is also a 19th-century gondola merry-go-round which was built in the Norfolk factory of Frederick Savage, decorated with carved heads depicting Queen Victoria and her family, including the German Kaiser Wilhelm II.

== In popular culture ==
One of the mechanical organs in the collection, a Wellershaus, was seen and heard in the Dad's Army television episode Everybody's Trucking, originally aired on 15 November 1974.

== See also ==
- List of music museums
- Scarborough Fair Collection
