= Steam Era =

Steam festival in Milton, Ontario, Canada

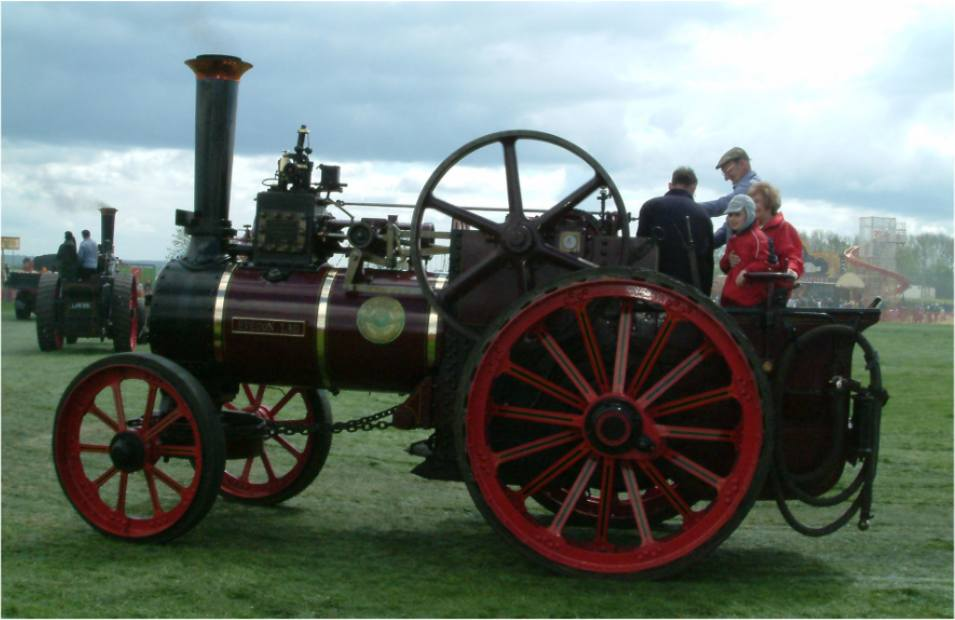
- A typical preserved traction engine.
- Genre: Provincial fair/Agricultural and entertainment
- Dates: 4 days on Labour Day weekend (September)
- Frequency: Annually
- Venue: Hume Auction Farm in Halton Hills, Ontario
- Locations: 9313 Fourth Line, L9T 2X9
- Years active: 65
- Founded: 1961
- Website: osapa.ca

Steam-Era is a festival held every Labour Day Weekend in the Town of Milton, Ontario featuring historic steam tractors. Well known for its eye on the past, the community annually celebrates the Milton Steam Era — populated by hundreds of steam-powered tractors, engines, and farm implements converging to salute a bygone era. Traditionally Milton's Steam Era has also featured a parade of steam tractors down Main St.

== Origins & History ==
A small group of local men, chatting at a machine shop in August, 1960, came up with the idea of a “steam show” — an annual event, where owners of vintage, steam-powered vehicles could parade their antique treasures. In August 1960, Bill Johnson of Burford and Les Lowe of Brookville were at Gordon Brigden's machine shop in Hornby and with the late Elmer Downs of Milton. the four discussed the possibility of putting on a steam show. On December 8. 1960 as a result of these discussions thirty-eight gentlemen gathered at Les Lowe's farm on the Guelph Line, north of Brookville. This was the founding meeting of the Ontario Steam and Antique Preservers' Association.

The first one, dubbed the “Steam Era,” was held on Labour Day weekend, in 1961, and the tradition continues to this day. In its early years, the whole town would get swept up in the nostalgic exercise, as well as an accompanying festival, called “Old-Fashioned Days,” in which everyone would dress up in clothing of bygone days. By its third year, the Steam Era attracted 27,000 spectators in 1963. By 1965, it had grown to 40,000.

In 1983, Miss Canada Jodi Rutledge and Miss Teen Canada Lori Assheton-Smith visited Steam Era.

Steam Era is the biggest exhibition of antique steam powered equipment in Ontario, thus lending Milton the title. In 2015, the event celebrated its 55th year.

== Attractions ==
Some of the events and displays at Steam Era include:

- Displays of the restored equipment that was a part of the very first Steam Era show
- Displays that were a part of the Steam Era’s first 10 years
- Tractor pulls
- Operating demonstrations of a sawmill, threshing, and shingle mill
- Steam Era Parade in downtown Milton
- Corn roast
- Night of Fire Spark Show

== See also ==
- List of steam fairs
