= Lebberston =

Village and civil parish in North Yorkshire, England

Coordinates: 54.22700°N 0.347200°W

- Location within North Yorkshire
- Population: 179 (2011 census)
- OS grid reference: TA078825
  - London: 185 mi (298 km) S
- Civil parish: Lebberston
- Unitary authority: North Yorkshire
- Ceremonial county: North Yorkshire
- Region: Yorkshire and the Humber
- Country: England
- Sovereign state: United Kingdom
- Post town: SCARBOROUGH
- Postcode district: YO11
- Police: North Yorkshire
- Fire: North Yorkshire
- Ambulance: Yorkshire
- UK Parliament: Scarborough and Whitby

Lebberston is a rural village and civil parish in North Yorkshire on the east coast of England. The village is situated 4 miles (6 km) south-east from Scarborough, and between the villages of Cayton and Gristhorpe.

== Community and landmarks ==
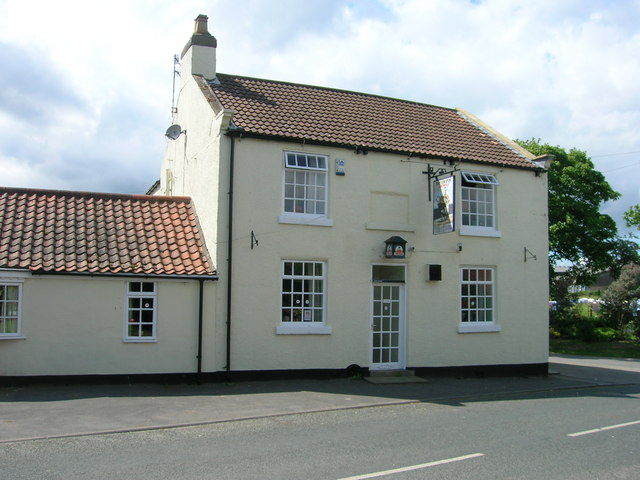
The Ox Inn

According to the 2011 Census, Lebberston parish had a population of 179, and in the 2001 Census, 182.

From 1974 to 2023 it was part of the Borough of Scarborough, it is now administered by the unitary North Yorkshire Council.

The village hall and church that serve Lebberston are in Gristhorpe.

Lebberston Manor lies at the centre of the village. Lebberston Hall, a house of Victorian origin, was altered in 2005 – the renovation received the 'Best One Off House' award from RIBA.

The village public house is The Ox Inn. In 1977, to commemorate the Queen's Silver Jubilee, a road race was run from The Ox Inn to The Bull Inn at Gristhorpe.

Just north of the village is the Flower of May Holiday Park, Lebberston Golf Course, and the Scarborough Fair Collection of preserved steam engines and mechanical organs.

Lebberston Market, an outdoor Sunday market and car boot sale, takes place from March to September.

The predominant local business is farming. Farms in the area include Manor Farm, Redcliffe Farm, and Lingholm Farm. The village has campsites for touring and static caravans, serving the North Yorkshire east coast tourism industry centred on Scarborough.

The village was the home of the late Gilbert Gray QC (1928–2011), barrister and Recorder, at the Old Bailey.
