= Great Dorset Steam Fair =

Annual show featuring steam-powered machinery

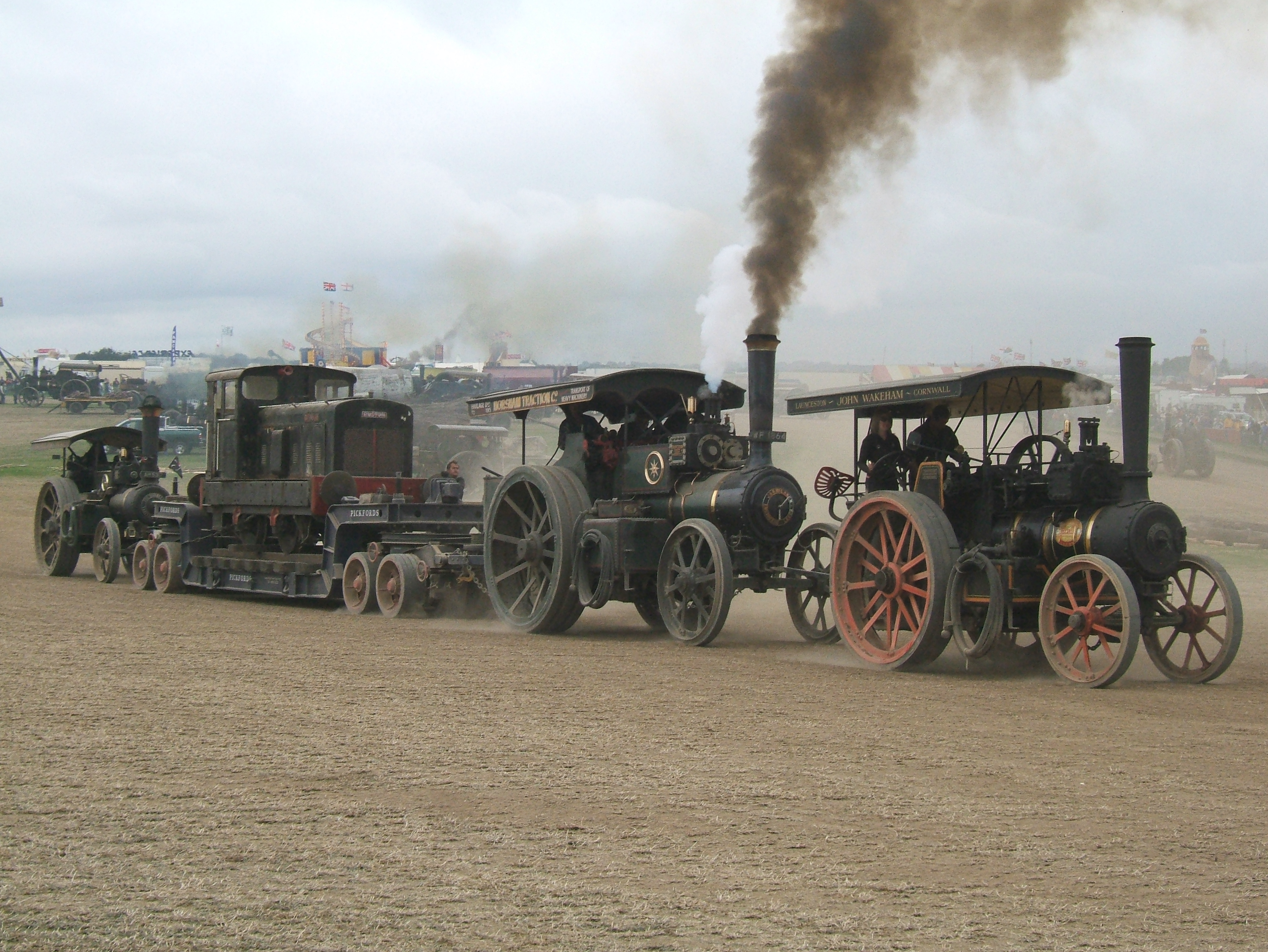
- Three road locomotives combine to haul a small diesel shunter (2007)
- Genre: Steam-powered vehicles and machinery
- Frequency: Annually
- Locations: Dorset, England
- Coordinates: 50°53′23″N 2°5′58″W
- Inaugurated: 1969
- Founder: Michael Oliver
- Previous event: 25-28 August 2022
- Area: 600 acres (2.4 km^{2})
- Website: www.gdsf.co.uk

The Great Dorset Steam Fair (abbreviated GDSF) was an annual show featuring steam-powered vehicles and machinery held in Dorset, England. It grew to cover 600 acres (2.4 km^{2}) and last for five days. It became regarded as the largest event of its kind in the world.

The fair was founded by the Dorset Steam & Historic Vehicle Club, and was held every summer from 1969 to 2019, and again in 2022. The event was organised by Michael Oliver, and later by his son Martin Oliver, through Great Dorset Steam Fair Ltd. As of 2024, the event was inactive and Great Dorset Steam Fair Ltd was advertised for sale.

== History ==
Following a meeting of like-minded individuals held in The Royal Oak in Okeford Fitzpaine, north Dorset, the first fair was held in 1969. For the first 16 years of its existence, the event (then known as the 'Great Working of Steam Engines') was held at a farmland site known as "Stourpaine Bushes". In 1985 this site was unavailable, resulting in a move to nearby Everley Hill. Three years later, the show moved to a larger and more permanent site at Tarrant Hinton, north of Blandford Forum. By 2015, the fair was attracting up to 200,000 visitors.

In 2020, the event was cancelled for the first time since its inception due to the COVID-19 pandemic, which also caused the 2021 fair to be cancelled. The fair did take place in 2022, but soon afterwards it was announced that there would not be a 2023 event due to rising costs. In November 2023, the business was put up for sale, with no buyer having been found a year later..

In September 2026, with the fair not having taken place since 2022, an auction sale was held at which over 1,000 items of remaining memorabilia, signs and supplies were sold, as well as the steam roller and fairground organ which were once owned by the show's founder.

== Exhibits ==
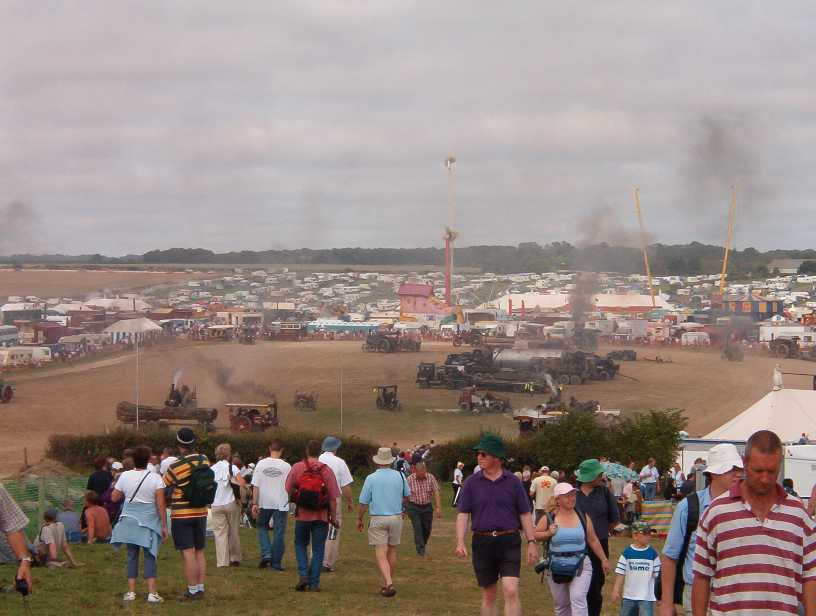
The steam fair in 2004

The most numerous exhibits were traction engines, tractors and farm machinery, but there were also sections for classic cars and commercial vehicles, working shire horses, rustic crafts, 'bygones' displays, and more. The show also had a market, autojumble, live music and funfair (some of which was powered by the steam engines). The funfair had traditional rides such as gallopers and steam boats, as well as modern ones like the "World Fair Wheel" which was sited in Manchester for the millennium. It was the biggest gathering of fairground organs in the UK.

The show regularly attracted around 200,000 visitors, and there were up to 30,000 people on site at any one time, making the fair the fifth largest population centre in Dorset, after Bournemouth, Poole, Weymouth and Christchurch (the population of the historic town of Dorchester being only half that number).

A speciality of the show was the display of traction engines and steam rollers performing the work for which they were designed. Such displays included heavy haulage, threshing, sawing logs, ploughing and road-making. The main arena of the show was sited on the slope of a hill to allow both steam- and internal combustion-powered machinery to demonstrate their capacity for heavy load hauling. One of the main displays was the line-up of showman's engines, in the vintage fairground section, which was thought to be the largest collection of such engines in the world. More than 60 showman's engines were present in 2004.

Starting in 2003, the show had contracted its own radio station, Steam Fair FM, broadcasting 24 hours daily from the Sunday prior to the show, to the Tuesday following – ten days in all. The station, which was also streamed on the internet, covered show news and views, weather and other relevant information with listener dedications and a format of "Vintage Hits". During the event, the station was advertised on roads in the surrounding area and provided traffic news for drivers using the A354 Blandford to Salisbury road that passes the show site. For the 40th anniversary, in 2008, the organisers recreated the very first fair, by tracing all of the exhibits that were displayed at the 1969 show.

== Dorset Sound Festival ==
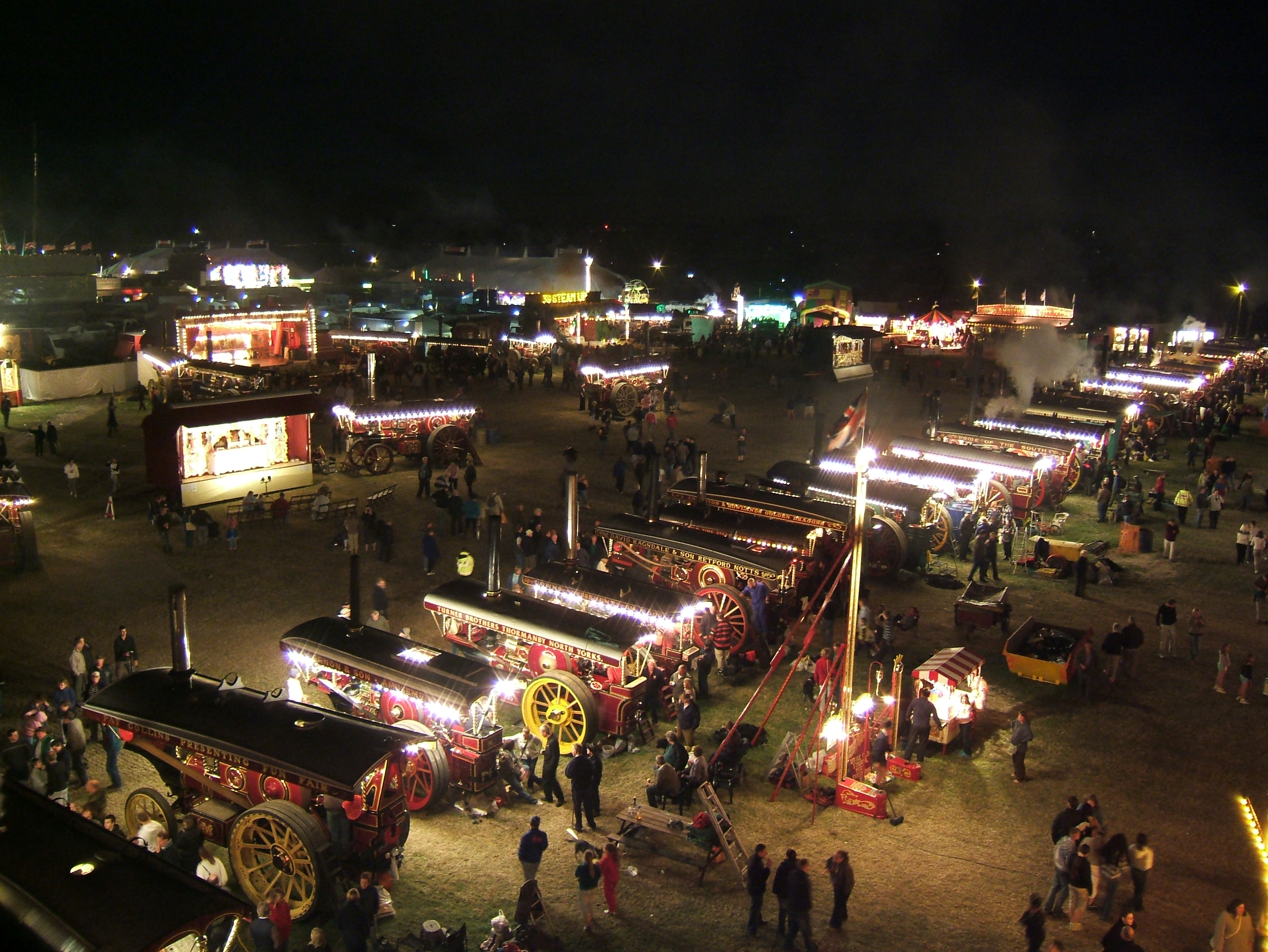
Night-time view of the line-up of showman's engines, in the fairground (2007)

2008 saw the start of the Dorset Sound Festival, a music event that was held alongside the main fair, designed to entertain a wide variety of musical tastes. The festival included five stages: the Main Stage, Real Ale Stage, Folk Stage, Country & Western Marquee and the Black Bull Marquee. Bands featured were mainly tribute acts, including the Bootleg Beatles.

In 2009, the Main Stage was changed from being inside a marquee to an outdoor concert stage. This required a concert ticket to be purchased unlike the other marquees that are free to visitors of the fair. 2009 saw the start of a new event called Steam Sounds that showcased acts from around the local area on the outdoor stage. The Main Stage later became free to all and did not require a ticket.

== World records ==
On 31 August 2013, GDSF set a new Guinness World Record for the largest parade of steam rollers, when 103 rollers were driven into the main arena for a photo call. The previous record for moving rollers had been set by GDSF in 2003 with 32 steam rollers.

At the 2018 fair another record was set with 472 steam-powered vehicles. In total there were 522 full-sized steam engines at the fair.

== Founding members ==
Michael Oliver is generally credited as the founder of the Great Dorset Steam Fair. A roster of participating individuals taken from the first event's souvenir programme and guide in September 1969 includes:

- President: Mr G. J. Romanes, M.A, M.R.C.S, D.O.M.S.
- Vice president: Mr E.C. Hines.
- Chairman: Mr J. E. B. Pocock
- Vice chairman: Mr M. F. Oliver
- Treasurer: Mr N. J. Fincham
- Public relations officer: Mr A. Imber.
- Joint secretaries: Mr & Mrs J. Cluet.

The sub committee for the event was T. M. Abbot, J. Antell, A. S. Braddick, J. Cluet, A. W. Field, G. A. Fincham, N. J. Fincham. F. Franklin, S. J. Garrett, H. Gray, E. C. Hine, A. Imber, G. J. Romanes, with secretary M. F. Oliver.

== See also ==
- List of steam fairs
- Steam Era
