= Lowndes Grove =

Historic house in South Carolina, United States

- U.S. National Register of Historic Places
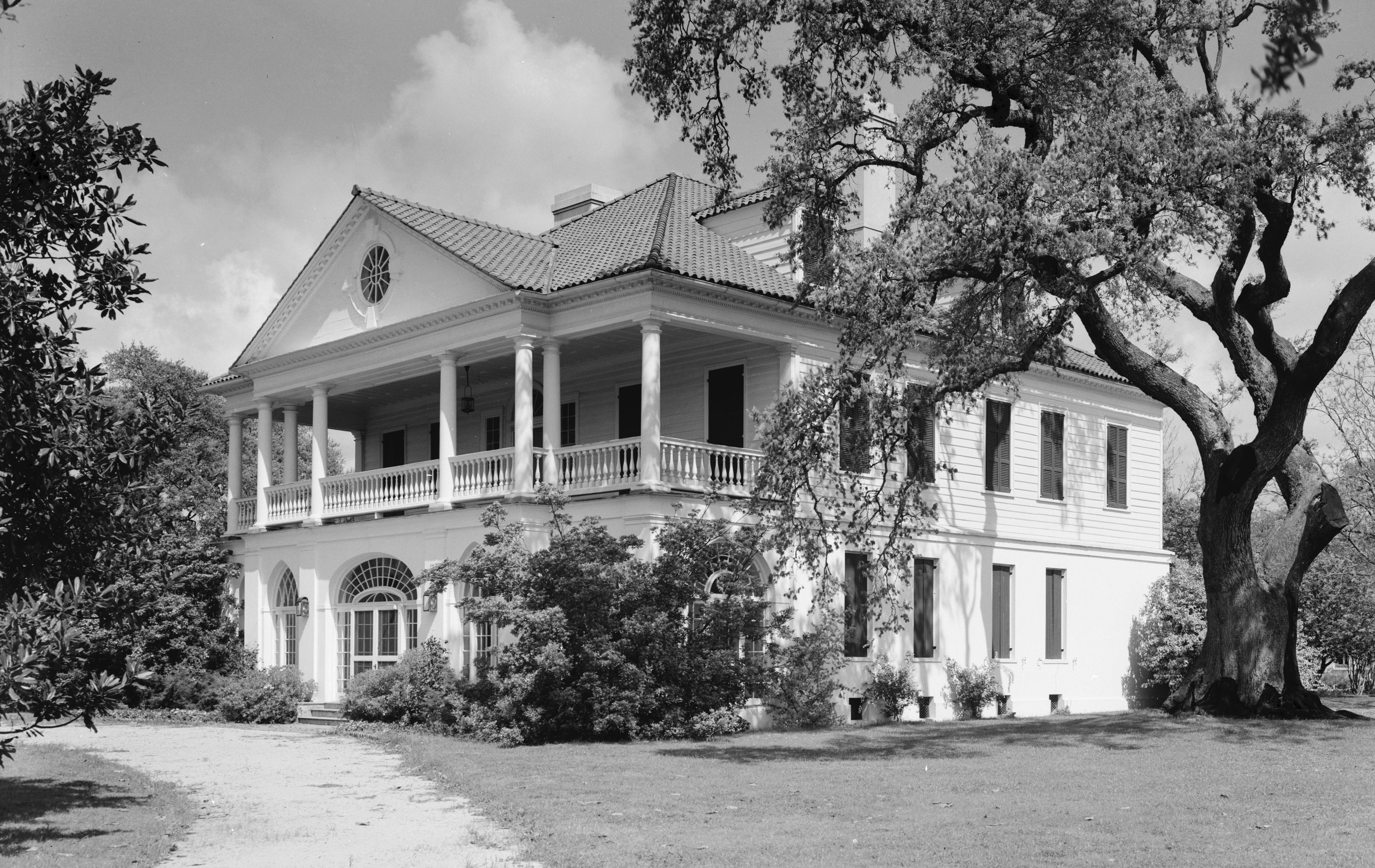
- Lowndes Grove in 1940

- Location within South Carolina Location within the United States
- Location: 260 St. Margaret St., Charleston, South Carolina
- Coordinates: 32°48′6″N 79°57′58″W
- Built: 1786
- Architectural style: Georgian
- NRHP reference No.: 78002500
- Added to NRHP: August 30, 1978

Lowndes Grove, also known as The Grove or Grove Farm, is a waterfront estate built in about 1786 on the Ashley River in Charleston. It is located in the Wagener Terrace neighborhood on a triangular plot of land bordered by St. Margaret Street, 5th Avenue, and 6th Avenue. It was named to the National Register of Historic Places on August 30, 1978.

== History ==
John Gibbes built a house and garden with greenhouses on The Grove before the Revolutionary War. The house was probably located near Indian Hill on the Citadel campus. It was likely destroyed in 1779, but the gardens remained. Around 1786, heirs of the Gibbes family divided the land into smaller tracts, and three of the northernmost parcels were acquired by George Abbot Hall. Since the 1791 inventory of Hall's estate mentioned a house, it is assumed that the house was built around 1786. The next owners were the Beaufain brothers of the West Indies who operated a small farming operation on the site. They sold the house, which they had named Wedderburn Lodge, to Mary Clodner Vesey. She, in turn, in 1803, sold the property to William Lowndes, who was elected to the U.S. Congress. He served in Congress until he resigned due to poor health in 1822. After several owners, a Charleston businessman, Frederick W. Wagener, acquired the house. He was the president and one of the chief promoters of the South Carolina Inter-State and West Indian Exposition, which was held in 1901–1902. The exposition was held on his 250 acres (100 ha) and the Lowndes Grove house was used as the Woman's Building.

In 1918, James Sottile purchased Lowndes Grove. Sottile owned and developed the Isle of Palms and later Sottile Farms, and by the time of his death in 1964, he was one of the richest people in America. Sottile developed much of the original land of the plantation into the streets and lots that surround the estate today.

In 2007, the home was purchased by the Patrick family who restored the property and made it an event venue. The house was featured in the Netflix series, Outer Banks (2020), as the set for the Cameron family's home.

== Architecture ==
It is a 1 1/2-story frame house on a raised basement. The top one and one-half stories are frame construction. The lower story and basement are stucco-covered brick. The house was probably designed in the Georgian style, but its original appearance has been lost during the course of many renovations. It probably had a double portico, modified in about 1830 into a five-bay upper piazza with Doric columns and balustrades. The three center bays project forward and have a pediment and oculus. The piazza and house have entablature with modillion and dentil blocks. In the 1830 renovations, the house was extended toward the rear. The sides of the house have nine over nine lights.

The house has a hip roof that was covered with terra cotta tiles in the 1920s. There are two dormers on each of the sides and three dormers in the rear. The house has two interior chimneys with corbelled caps.

The interior has a four-room plan with central hallway. The ceilings and walls are plastered. The house has its original floors. Most major rooms are decorated in Adamsesque style with cornices, ceiling medallions, and carved mantels. The first and second story rooms on the northwest were decorated in Regency style when the house was enlarged. The first floor room toward the northeast was badly damaged in a fire during the 20th century. The room was rebuilt as a kitchen and library. The house has a spiral staircase with circular skylight. Additional pictures are available.

== See also ==
- The Woman's Building at the World's Columbian Exposition
- National Register of Historic Places listings in Charleston, South Carolina
