= Blakesley railway station =

Former railway station in Northamptonshire, England

Coordinates: 52.144033°N 1.088939°W

Blakesley
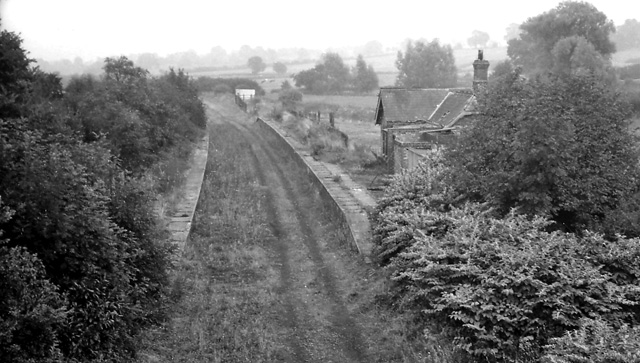
- Remains of the station in 1967

General information
- Location: Blakesley, West Northamptonshire; England
- Grid reference: SP624499
- Platforms: 2

Other information
- Status: Disused

History
- Original company: East and West Junction Railway
- Pre-grouping: Stratford-upon-Avon and Midland Junction Railway
- Post-grouping: London, Midland and Scottish Railway; London Midland Region of British Railways

Key dates
- 1 July 1873: Opened
- 1 August 1877: Closed
- 22 February 1885: Reopened
- 7 April 1952: Closed to passengers
- 3 February 1962: Goods facilities withdrawn
Location

Blakesley was a railway station on the Stratford-upon-Avon and Midland Junction Railway (SMJ) which served the Northamptonshire village of Blakesley between 1873 and 1962. It was linked to nearby Blakesley Hall by a miniature railway which ran from a terminal adjacent to the station.

== History ==
A line from Greens Norton junction near Towcester to Stratford-upon-Avon and the junction with the Great Western Railway's Honeybourne branch line was first authorised in June 1864, but due to a lack of funds it took a further nine years for the line, built by the East and West Junction Railway, to be fully open to traffic. A station was opened at Blakesley, a Northamptonshire village 8 1/2 miles (13.7 km) from Blisworth, with two platforms enclosing the running line as well as a loop line which also served as a goods siding. A signal box was located between the east end of the down platform and the loading dock, and to the west a road overbridge carried Blakesley High Street over the line. The station buildings, a one-storey brick building, were demolished by 1952 leaving the station as little more than a halt. Passenger services were withdrawn later that year, with goods continuing for a further ten years.

Blakesley station was linked to nearby Blakesley Hall by the 15 inches (380 mm) gauge Blakesley Miniature Railway which ran from a terminal located to the west of the station at the rear of the down platform. The railway conveyed coal, farm supplies and guests to the Hall over a distance of 1/2 mile (0.8 km). It was opened in 1903 by the owner of Blakesley Hall, Charles Bartholomew, a Yorkshire colliery owner and shareholder in the East and West Junction Railway. Two Cagney 4-4-0 locomotives and rolling stock were obtained from the United States. The miniature railway, which was fully signalled using Sykes electric banner signals, was particularly popular on Blakesley Fete days. Following Bartholomew's death in 1919, his widow allowed the line to remain and be used by tourists on special occasions. The track was lifted in 1940 after being sold to an estate in Yorkshire.

== Routes ==
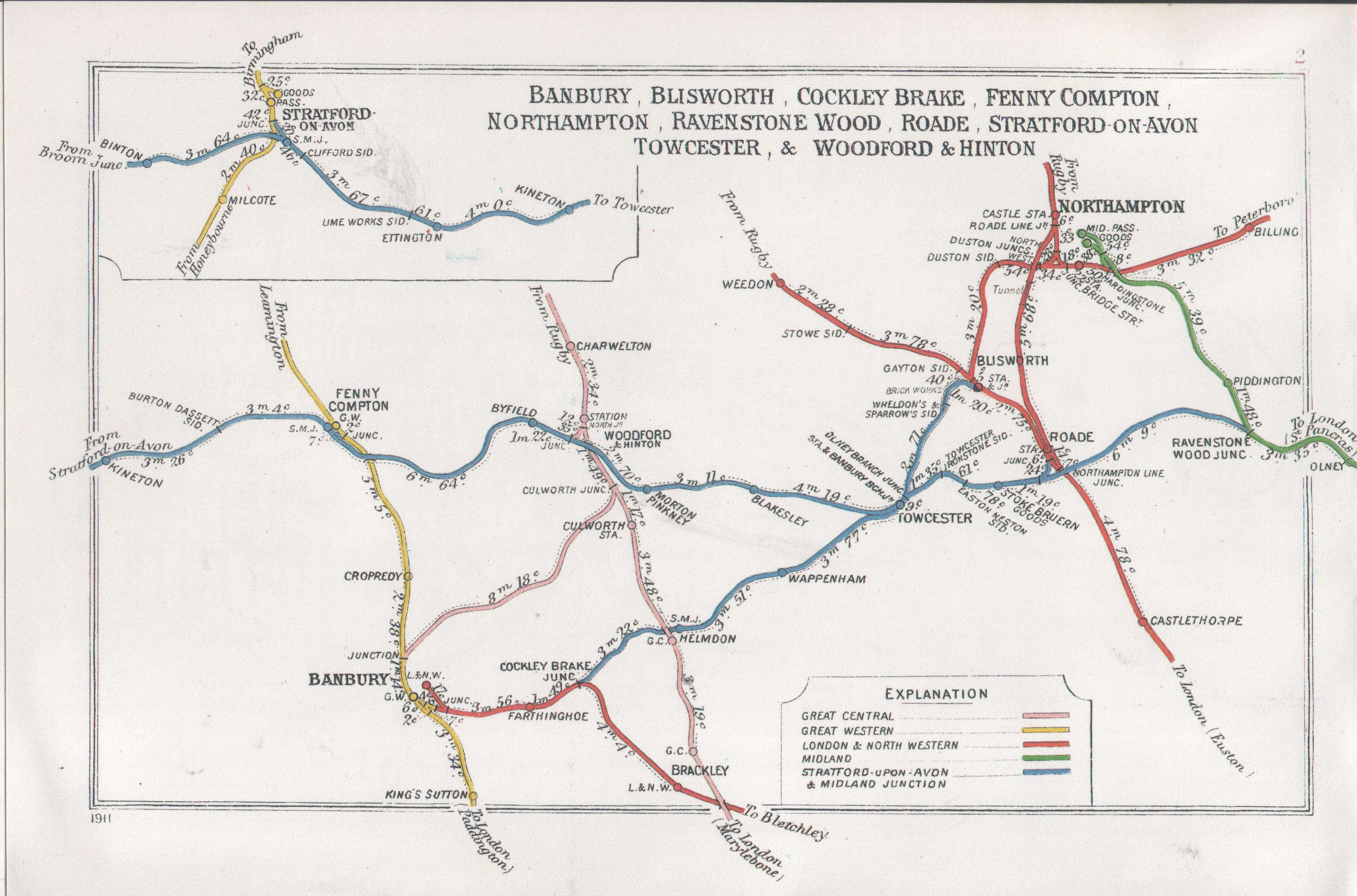
A 1911 Railway Clearing House map of railways in the vicinity of Blakesley (centre, in blue)

Preceding station	Disused railways	Following station
Morton Pinkney	SMJR; East and West Junction Railway	Towcester

== Present day ==
Nothing remains of the station. A modern bungalow has been across the trackbed and blocks the eastern side of the High Street overbridge. A derelict Blakesley Hall was demolished in 1957, but one of the locomotives, a 4-4-4 tank engine known as "Blacolvesley" and designed by Henry Greenly, was used at a miniature railway in Haswell Lodge in County Durham, and is now with the Ravenglass and Eskdale Railway.
