= Blakesley Miniature Railway =

Coordinates: 52.145°N 1.095°W

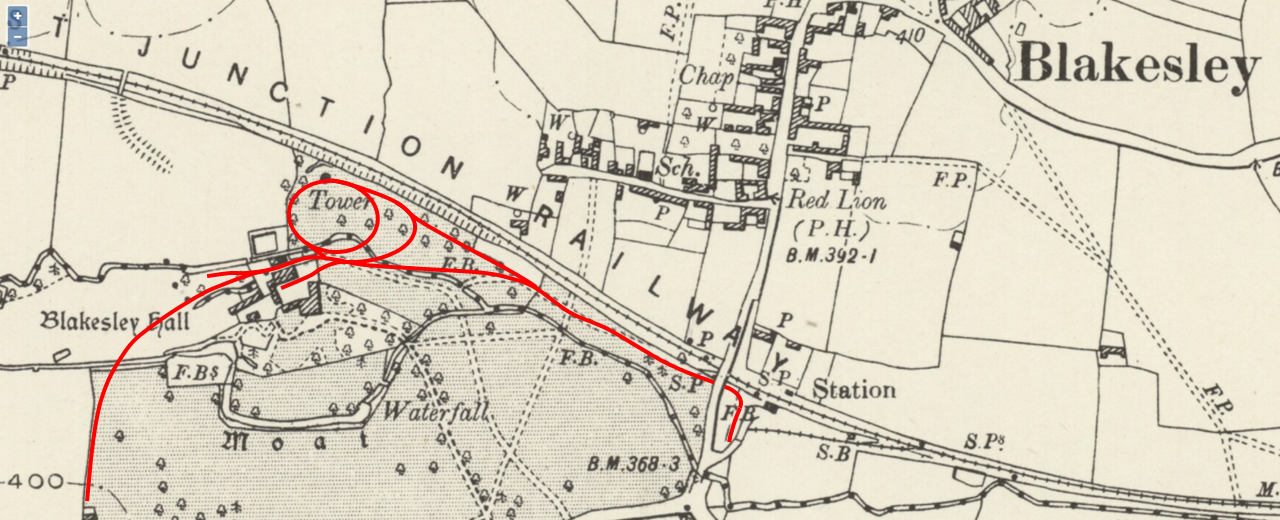

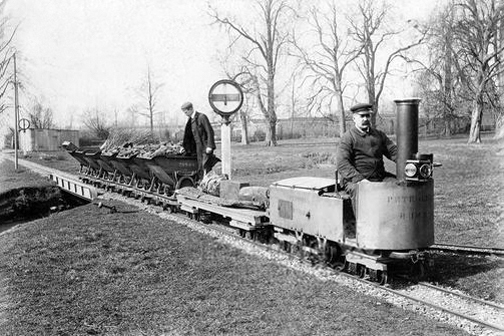
- Assumed route of the track and Petrolia hauling a goods train, both around 1909

Technical
- Line length: 0.5 miles (0.80 km)
- Track gauge: 15 in (381 mm)
- Minimum radius: Until 1909: 80 ft = 24.3 m After 1909: 100 ft = 30.5 m
- Signalling: yes

The Blakesley Miniature Railway was an 804-yard-long (735 m) 15 in (381 mm) gauge railway from Blakesley railway station to Blakesley Hall in Blakesley in West Northamptonshire, which operated from 1903 to 1946.

== Location ==
The 15-inch (381 mm) railroad was less than half a mile (800 m) long and ran from Blakesley Railway Station on the standard gauge East & West Junction Railway to the power plant and cowsheds at the back end of the property. It served primarily for the transport of coke, but was also occasionally used for transporting passengers from and to the nearby station.

== History ==
The track was laid in 1903 by Charles William Bartholomew (1850–1919) on his estate at Blakesley Hall. He was a wealthy civil engineer and landowner, major shareholder of the Great Central Railway and the East & West Junction Railway (E&WJR), self-proclaimed squire of the communities of Blakesley and Woodend. It was inaugurated in 1903 with a Cagney steam locomotive. In the following year, 1904, another Cagney steam locomotive was temporarily used on the track, which is now on display at the Strumpshaw Hall Steam Museum in Norfolk. In 1905, the petrol locomotive Petrolia was built and put into operation. The route was extended in 1909 to the bungalow of the farm, while a large part of the circle and the wye were dismantled. The locomotive Blacolvesley was delivered on 11 September 1909. The Cagney was then lent to the Sutton Hall Railway.

The track was extended in 1910 to the cowsheds and had subsequently a total length of 804 yards (735 m). The petrol locomotive Petrolia was rebuilt to look more like a steam locomotive. The Cagney locomotive was returned in 1914 by the Sutton Hall Railway. Charles William Bartholomew died on 29 April 1919. His heirs then tried to sell the Cagney locomotive in 1923. Either 1928 or 1929, the track section from the bungalow to the animal stables was shut down.

After Charles William Bartholomew had died in 1919, his widow still used the trains occasionally "on high days and holidays", which were otherwise stored in a three-track locomotive and wagon shed. The railway was used once again in 1932 as a feeder to the Blakesley Show, 1935 at the silver jubilee of George V and in 1937 to celebrate the coronation of George VI.

The Cagney steam locomotive and possibly Petrolia and some of the rails were sold in 1936 to the Deans Mill Railway. Justice of the Peace Dorothy Elliot, a longtime family friend and secretary of the Wombwell Colliery, acquired in 1942, under dubious circumstances, the remaining wagons and probably also some track material. It later turned out that she had embezzled £91,630 from the mine, for which she was imprisoned. The sale of her home and her possessions raised only £21,000 towards the repatriation of the misappropriated funds.

The main line was used from 1942 to about 1944 with manually pushed V-skip trucks to transport coke to the estate's power plant. Around 1946, the remnants of the line were dismantled and the trucks scrapped. When Sarah, the second wife of Charles William Bartholomew, with whom he had the children Ivy and James, moved to her son's house in Norfolk in 1947, the furniture and other contents of the manor house were auctioned off. The property was initially sold to the Hesketh family in 1949, but subsequently changed ownership several times. Sarah died in 1953 at the age of 89 years. After Blakesley Hall had fallen into disrepair for over ten years, it was demolished in 1957.

== Locomotives ==
Name	Manufacturer	Photo	Remarks
	Cagney		The carriages and trucks were modified with the help of Alex Wyatt
Petrolia	Groom & Tattersall of Towcester		'Petrolia' after modification 'Petrolia' was unsuccessfully converted to a 0-4-4T steam outline loco by Bassett-Lowke in 1910, and this led to much animosity between Charles William Bartholomew and Henry Greenly.
Blacolvesley (4-4-4T)	Bassett-Lowke of Northampton		Preserved on the Ravenglass and Eskdale Railway. Owned by Dr. Bob Tebb, Blacolvesley is the oldest workable internal combustion locomotive in the world. It was built by Bassett-Lowke in 1909 utilising parts of Henry Greenly's Class 10 Atlantic locomotives. Originally, it was fitted with a NAG 12/14 h.p. engine, which was later replaced with an Austin 8 engine at Saltbur. However, the original transmission, gearbox and bevel drive all remain in use.
