= South Carolina Inter-State and West Indian Exposition =

American worlds fair

Charleston, South Carolina
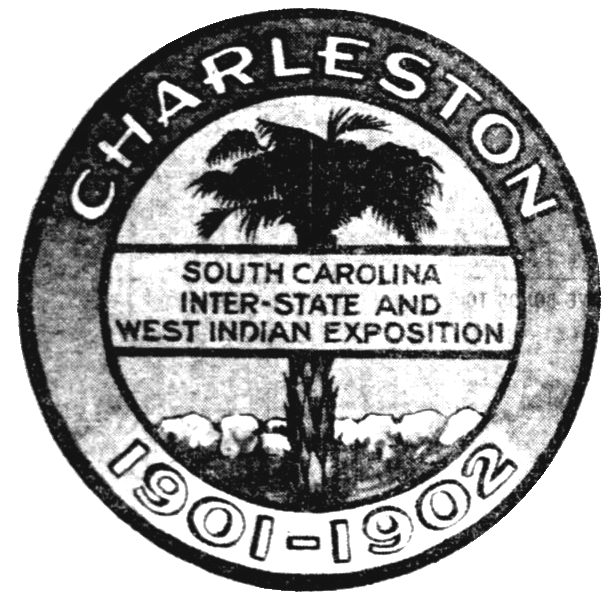

Overview
- BIE-class: Universal exposition
- Category: Historical Expo
- Name: South Carolina Inter-State and West Indian Exposition
- Building(s): Cotton Palace
- Area: 250 acres (100 hectares)
- Visitors: 674,086

Participant(s)
- Countries: 4

Location
- Country: United States
- City: Charleston, South Carolina

Timeline
- Opening: December 1, 1901
- Closure: June 20, 1902

Specialized expositions

The South Carolina Inter-State and West Indian Exposition (commonly called the Charleston or West Indian Exposition) was a regional trade fair held in Charleston, South Carolina, from December 1, 1901, to June 20, 1902.

== History ==
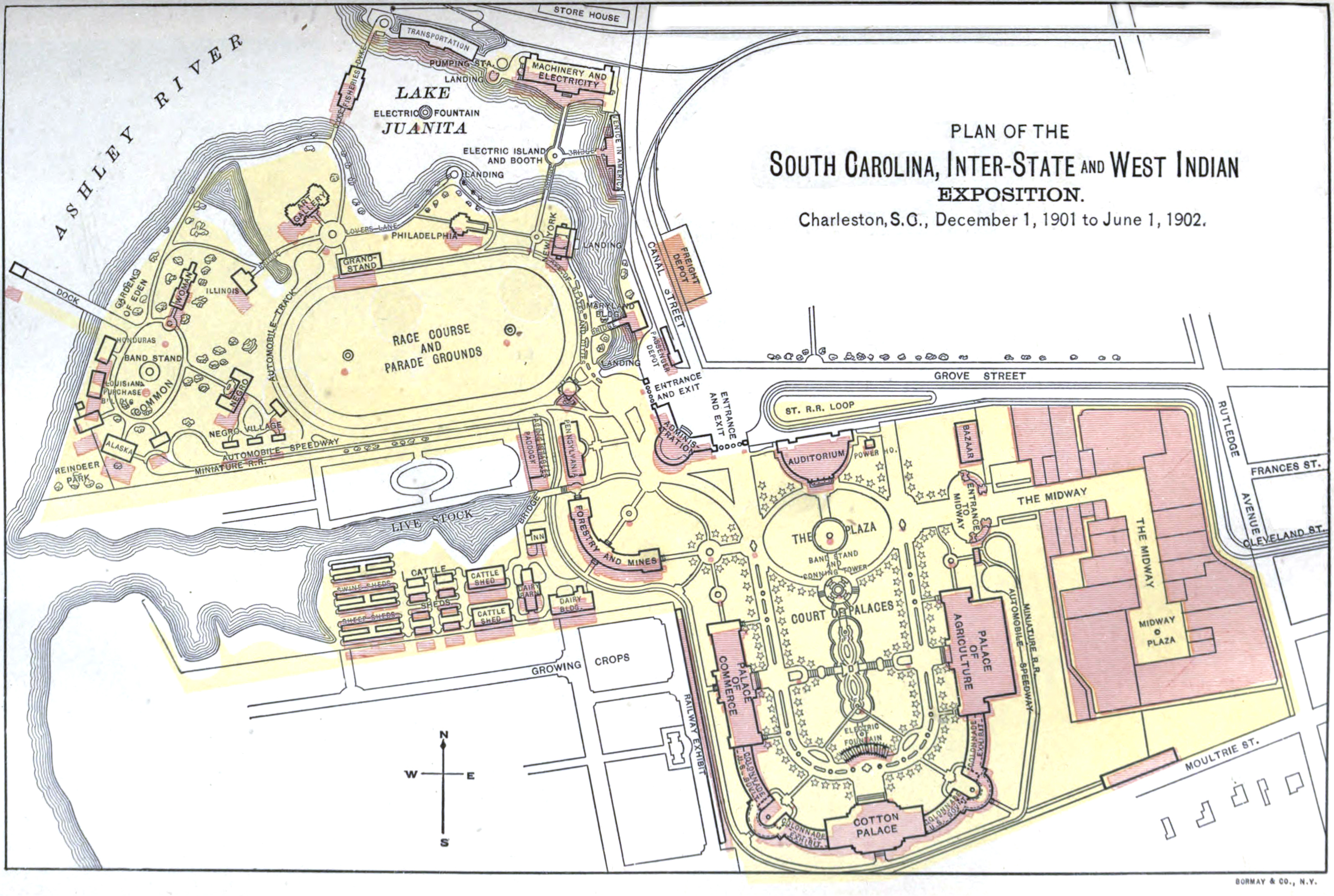
Plan of the exposition

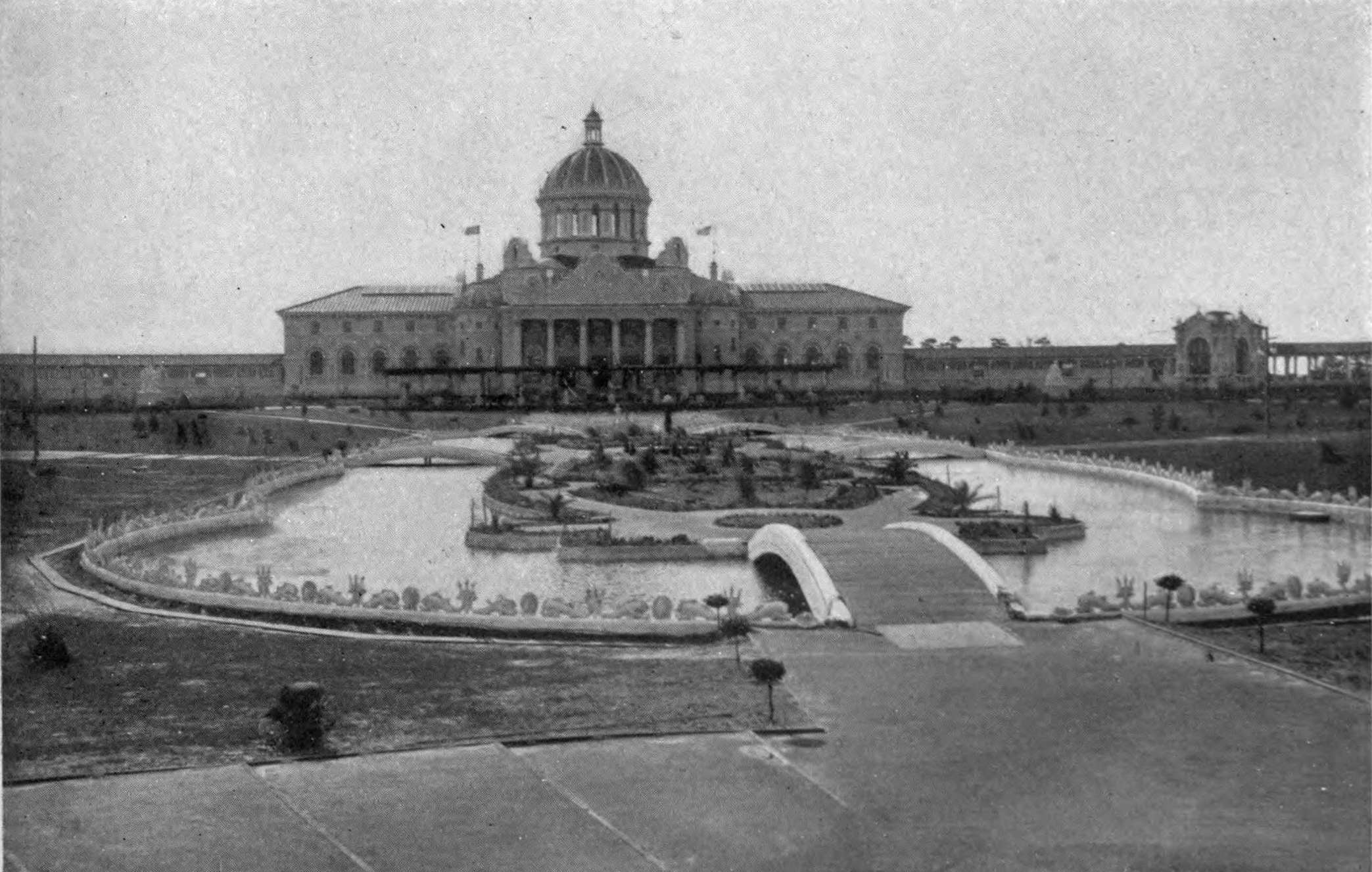
Cotton Palace and Sunken Garden

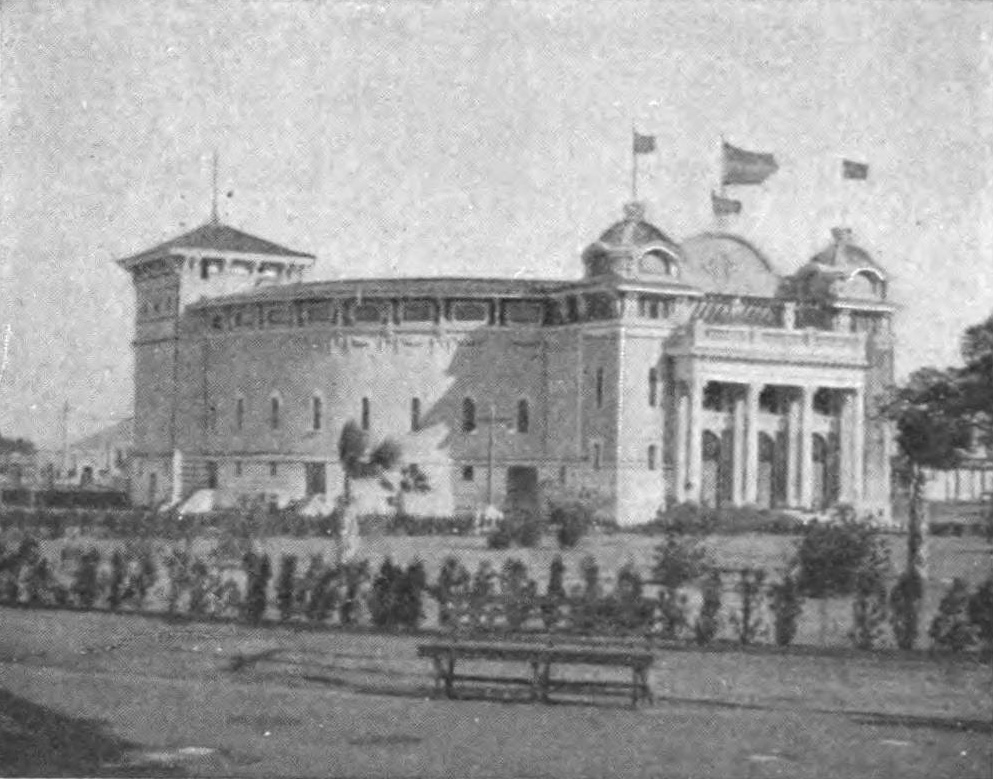
The Auditorium

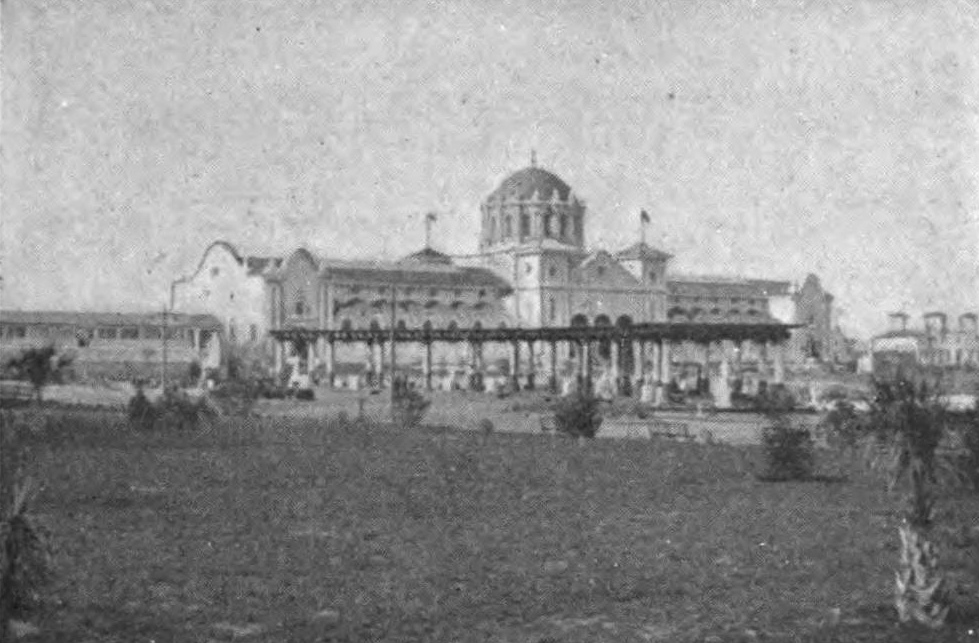
Manufactures Building

To overcome weakening trade with Latin America and the Caribbean and seeing the benefits of fairs like the Cotton States and International Exposition held in Atlanta, Georgia in 1895, a railroad executive, J. H. Averill, advocated holding an exposition in Charleston in the News and Courier. J. C. Hemphill, the editor of the News and Courier, and Frederick W. Wagener, a German immigrant and local businessman, were two early supporters of hosting a world's fair in Charleston.

In 1900, the Charleston Exposition Company was formed and began soliciting funds. There was support from the business community and the South Carolina General Assembly allocated $50,000, but the Charleston aristocracy felt that the fair was unseemly self-promotion. The Federal government, which had normally contributed funds, did not offer early support. There were no official exhibits from abroad.

Wagener, who was president of the exposition company, suggested that 250 acres (100 ha) of his property on the Ashley River be used for the fair. The company hired a New York architect, Bradford L. Gilbert, who had been supervising architect for the Cotton States and International Exposition. Gilbert chose Spanish Renaissance style with the buildings painted creamy off-white. This led to it being called the "Ivory City."

The Exposition faced many challenges. The weather was not good, some exhibits were late in opening, and there was a shortage of funds. President Theodore Roosevelt delayed his visit from February to April. The attendance was disappointing. Only 674,086 people came to the exposition. The cost of the exposition was $1,250,000, while the receipts were $313,000.

== Exhibits ==
The fair and its grounds were divided into two areas: Nature and Art. The focus of the exposition was the Cotton Palace, a 320-foot (98 m) long building with a 75-foot (23 m) tall dome. The other major buildings were the Palace of Commerce and the Palace of Agriculture. The Woman's Building was in Wagener's Lowndes Grove house. The other major buildings were: Administration, Art, Auditorium, Fisheries, Machinery, Mines and Forestry, Negro, Transportation, and Women.

Twenty different states participated in the exposition. State buildings were erected by Illinois, Maryland, Missouri, New York, and Pennsylvania. Pennsylvania featured the Liberty Bell in its exhibit. The cities of Cincinnati and Philadelphia also had buildings. Special structures were devoted to the exhibits of Cuba, Puerto Rico, and Guatemala.

The grounds were adorned with statuary, among them six original historical groups, situated in the Court of Palaces. Statuary included "The Aztec" by Louis A. Gudebrod, "The Negro" by Charles A. Lopez, and "The Huguenot" by Elsie Ward.

The midway had a carnival with thrill rides, a 400-foot (122 m) long painting of the Battle of Manassas, and an Eskimo village. There was a Turkish Parlor with imported cigars and a house of horrors.

A miniature railroad of the Miniature Railway Company proved to be one of the most popular attractions and best-paying amusement features on the grounds. The routes touched all points of interest from the Sunken Gardens and the Court of Palaces to the headquarters for hoky-poky.

As with similar expositions, there were souvenirs for sale which included commemorative medals, pins, and other trinkets.

== Legacy ==
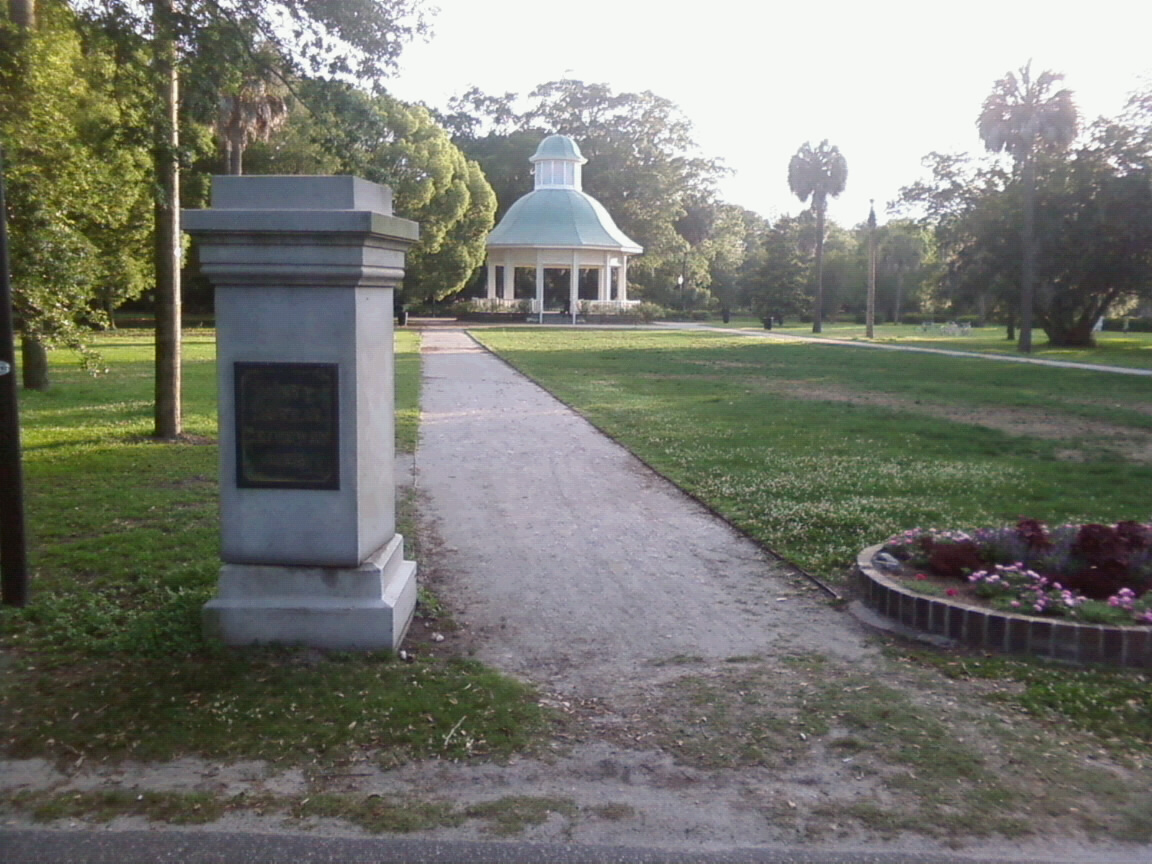
Bandstand from Exposition, now in Hampton Park

After the exposition, Charleston built Hampton Park on the eastern portion of the grounds that included the Exposition's formal court. Although it was moved and rebuilt, the bandstand in the park remains. In 1919, South Carolina obtained the western portion. This was used for the new campus of The Citadel. Lowndes Grove, which was the Women's Building in the exposition, remains.
