= Groom & Tattersall =

Company of ironfounders and engineers in Towcester

Groom & Tattersall was a company of ironfounders and engineers in Towcester, Northamptonshire.

== Company registrations ==
The company was founded in 1900 by Alfred Rishworth Tattersall (1863-July 1949) as Messrs. Groom and Tattersall, Ltd., although the oldest records go back to 1876. On 27 April 1918, Groom & Tattersall, Limited was registered at Station Works Tiffield Road in Towcester, Northamptonshire.

== Inventions, awards and products ==
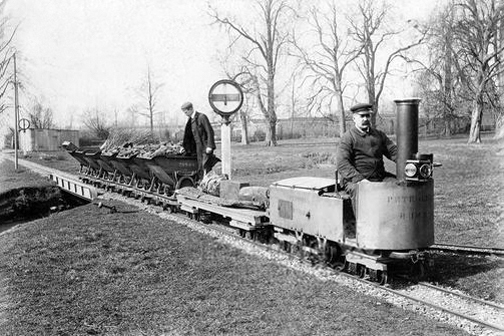
Petrolia petrol locomotive of the Blakesley Miniature Railway

Alfred Rishworth Tattersall invented an improved apparatus for distilling wood, peat and other substances, and a centrifugal dresser. He received in 1917 the John Scott Award on behalf of City of Philadelphia for his Midget Marvel Flour Mill. This was a small and simple flour mill for farming communities, in which water mills had been abandoned. The company built for instance the Petrolia petrol locomotive for the Blakesley Miniature Railway.
