= Wagener Terrace =

Neighbourhood in Charleston, South Carolina, United States

Coordinates: 32.81635°N 79.95119°W

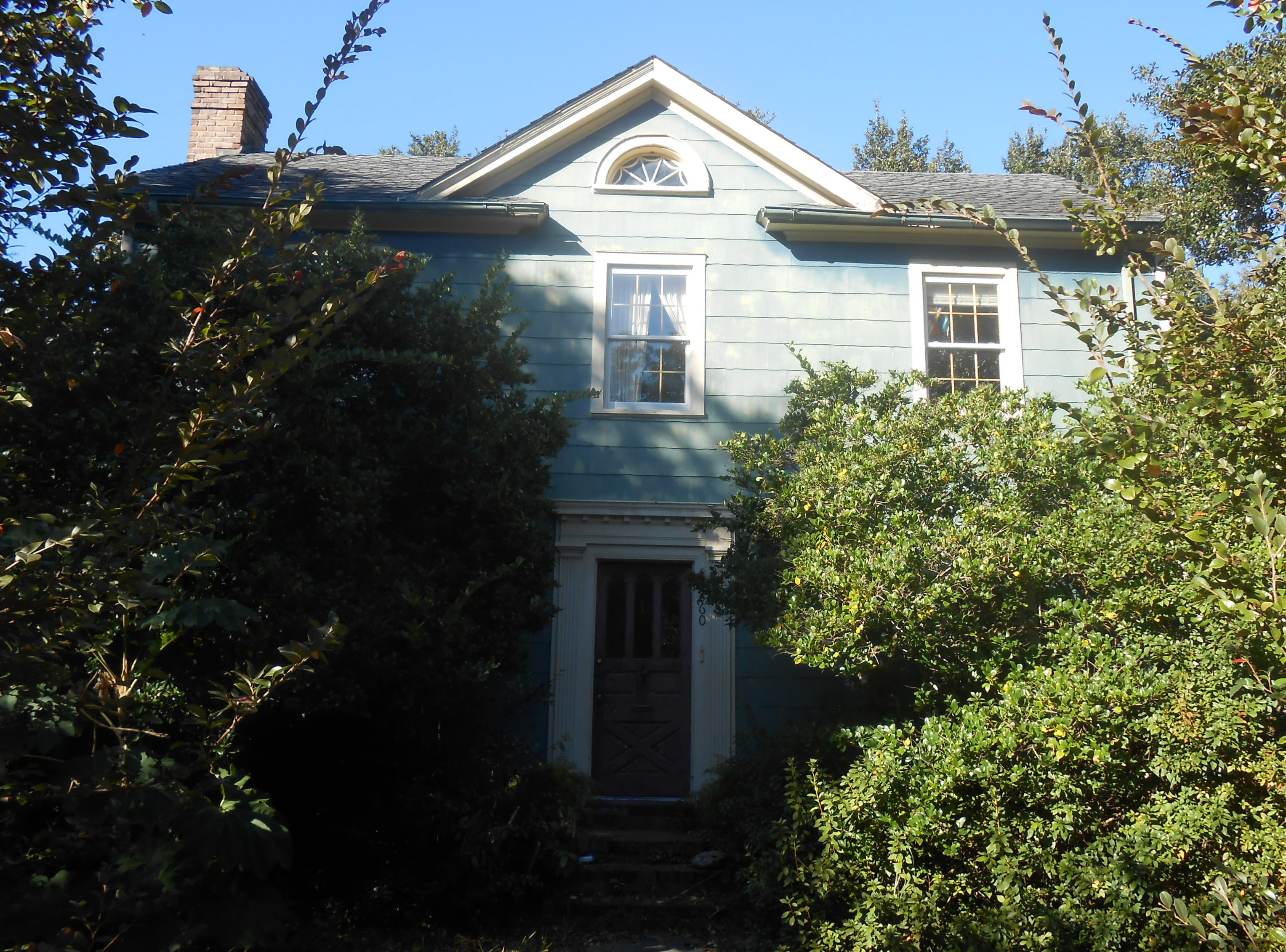
The Colonial style house at 360 Grove Street was built in 1936 as a model home.

Wagener Terrace in Charleston, South Carolina is a large neighborhood made property that had been owned by Louis Dunnemann and Capt. F.W. Wagener.

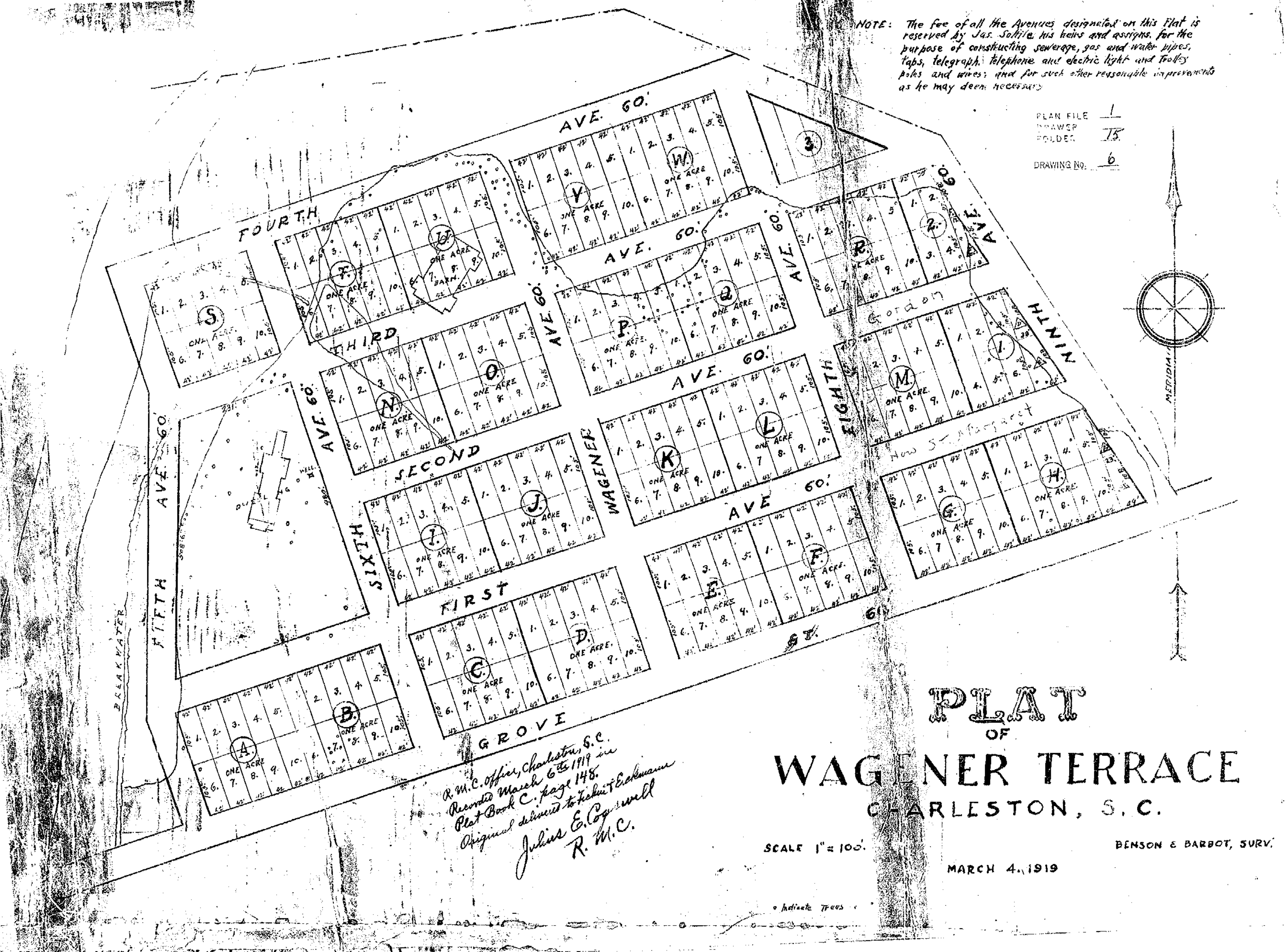
The plat of the original portion of Wagener Terrace was limited to the southwest corner of the current neighborhood.

Subsequent developments added several hundred more lots. Today, the neighborhood is widely defined as the area bounded by Hampton Park and The Citadel (on the south), Mt. Pleasant Street (on the north), Rutledge Avenue (on the east), and the Ashley River (on the west).

The name of the neighborhood came from Frederick W. Wagener, a very successful wholesale grocer and president and one of the chief promoters of the South Carolina Inter-State and West Indian Exposition which was held in 1901–1902. Wagener lived at Lowndes Grove.

James Sottile, who was the head of the Wagener Terrace Corporation (the main developer) and the most important promoter of the development, later lived at Wagener's house, Lowndes Grove Plantation, at the northwest corner of the planned neighborhood. There were four houses in the area by 1919 along the Ashley River; the Bottjer House was bought and restored by Dowse B. Rustin at the western foot of Grove Street.

The City of Charleston undertook the addition of sewers and road paving in Wagener Terrace in 1923. Other than those pre-development houses, the bulk of the neighborhood was built out in the 1930s.

Although located only a short drive from the commercial center of the city, Wagener Terrace was not tied into the nearby areas by a network of roads at first. A proposal to extend 10th Avenue southward into Hampton Park was raised by City Council in 1934; the Seaboard Air Line Railroad blocked the access at times. The plan was met with both support (claiming that the new road would spur development of Wagener Terrace) and opposition (claiming that the access would overtax Mary Murray Blvd. encircling Hampton Park and open the park to "certain undesirable elements"). Eventually, the railroad was asked to install automatic crossing guards; the city abandoned the idea of building a viaduct since the incline would have to have been 500 feet long and would have to have been 28 feet high.

By 1935, there were only 35 houses, mainly of brick veneer, in the neighborhood. It was only a 12 minute drive to the commercial section of Charleston. Most of the houses were designed by Amos L. Curry, manager of the Curry Construction Co., for construction by Rosewood Realty Co. Eugene Schmetzer (of Rosewood Realty Co.) built a model home at 360 Grove Street that was designed by Stephen Thomas to spur development.

Residents continued to receive mail by rural delivery at a central mailbox at Rutledge Avenue and Grove Street even in 1937. Streets in the northwest section of the city began getting delivery to specific houses on May 24, 1938.

A plan was made in 1937 to develop a 7.3 acre parcel owned by the City with low-income housing as part of a slum clearance program.

About fifty houses were added in 1936-1938. Eugene Schmetzer was responsible for many of the houses. He bought a tract and divided it into 120; when those were sold off, he repeated the process on a 100-lot parcel.
