= Blakesley Hall, Northamptonshire =

Manor house in Northamptonshire, England

Coordinates: 52.145°N 1.095°W

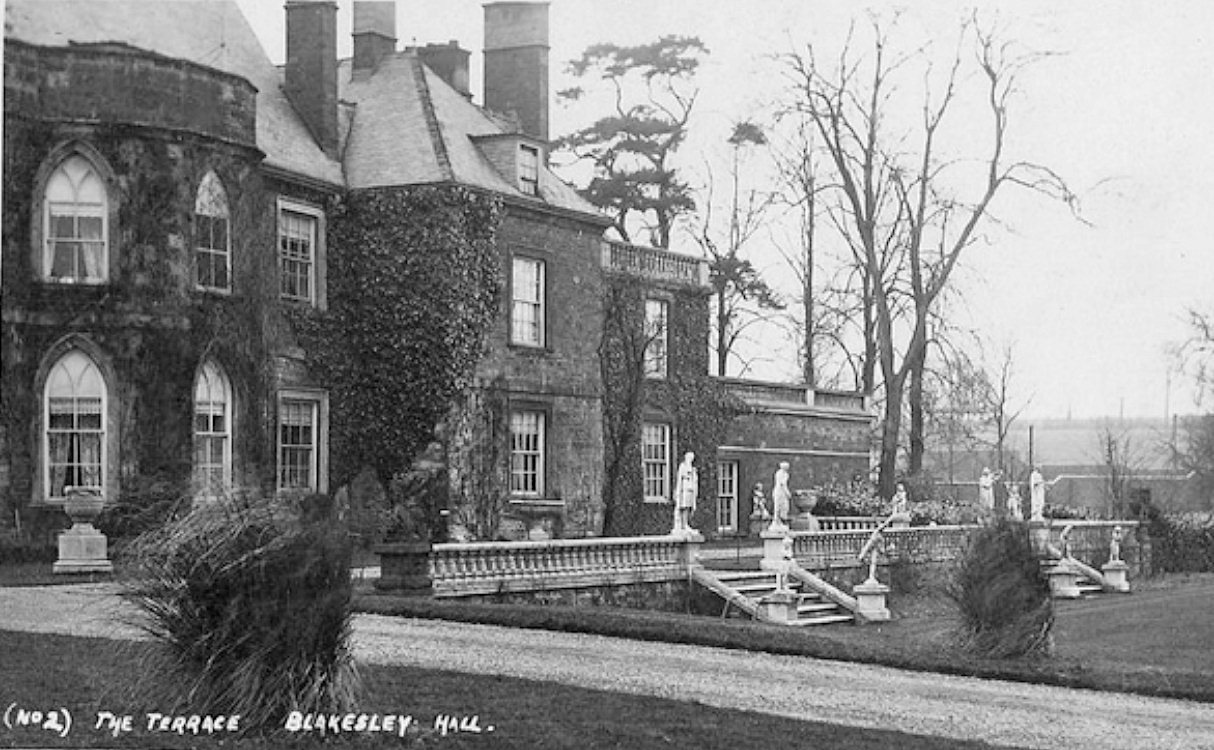
Blakesley Hall

Blakesley Hall was a 13th-century manor house situated near the village of Blakesley in Northamptonshire, England. It was demolished in 1957-58.

== History ==
The Hall dated from the reign of King Henry III and at one time was given by Henry VIII to his daughter, Princess Elizabeth (Queen Elizabeth I of England).

The Hall was once a possession of the Knights of St John of Jerusalem.

It was owned by the Hibbit family for over forty years between 1823 and 1867. The owner William Hibbit (c1770–1840) inherited the titles lord of the manor and 'patron of the living'. During this period the Hibbit's were responsible for many alterations to both the Hall and the grounds. These included construction of a hospital wing and extensive landscaping of the gardens. The stable block was a focal meeting point for the Blakesley Hunt during their residence.

The family connections with Blakesley extended to the local church St Mary The Virgin, where they were celebrated patrons (a plaque is on display near the altar). The beautiful sandstone font, donated by one of William's sons, the Reverend Arthur Hibbit BA (Cambridge) (1818–1893), the vicar of St. Mary's, is still in use for baptisms.

Ownership of the Hall for the years between 1867 and 1875 was shrouded in mystery and intrigue with contestation of wills and estate claims abounding.

The hall was owned by Charles William Bartholomew, a civil engineer, from 1876 to 1919. In 1903, Bartholemew constructed a 15-inch (380 mm)-gauge ridable Blakesley Miniature Railway. The narrow-gauge line ran the half a mile from Blakesley station on the closed Stratford-upon-Avon and Midland Junction Railway to the Hall. It carried coal, farm supplies and the occasional passenger and when the Hall became a military hospital during the first world war, the line was used to rehabilitate patients. The track was lifted in 1940.

One of the engines run on the miniature railway was a 4-4-4T internal combustion locomotive (with a steam outline) named Blackolvesley and built by Bassett-Lowke of Northampton in 1909.

== Renovation ==
In 2015, local Chartered Architects Planners and Surveyors, the Roger Coy Partnership based in Eydon, have been granted planning permission to undertake work on their proposed recreation of the hall. The current owner discovered a stream by landscape gardeners, James Pulham and Son (a firm which specialized in the production of simulated rock, known as Pulham Rock, for garden features in the 19th century) while clearing the grounds in readiness for the redevelopment. The stream, which had become overgrown, included cascades and other water features.
