= Hampton Park (Charleston) =

Urban park in Charleston, South Carolina, United States

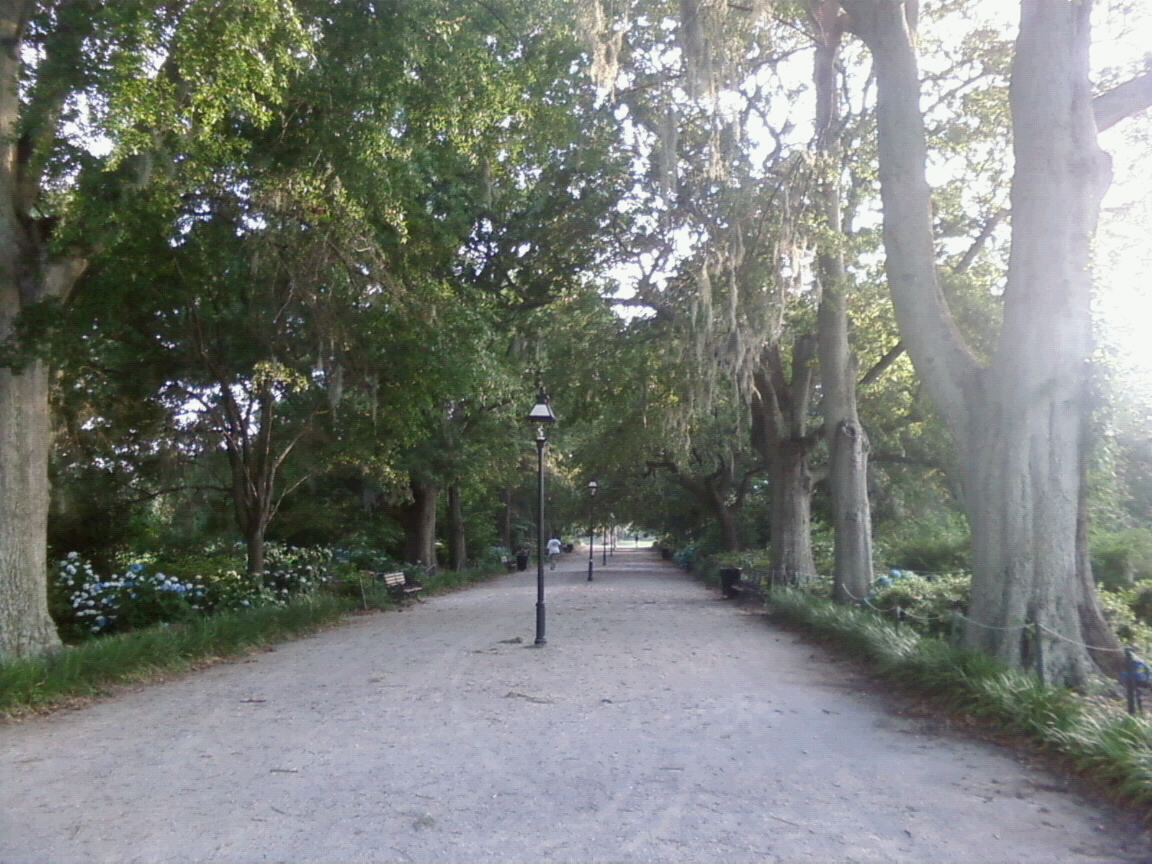
- Interactive map of Hampton Park
- Coordinates: 32°48′0″N 79°57′22″W
- Area: 60 acres (24 ha)
- Created: 1906
- Parking: 40

Hampton Park is a public park located in peninsular Charleston, South Carolina, United States. At 60 acres (240,000 m^{2}), it is the largest park on the peninsula. It is bordered by The Citadel to the west, Hampton Park Terrace to the south, North Central to the east, and Wagener Terrace to the north. The park is named in honor of Confederate General Wade Hampton III who, at the time of the Civil War, owned one of the largest collections of slaves in the South. After the Civil War, Hampton became a proponent of the Lost Cause movement, member of the Red Shirts and governor of South Carolina.

== History ==
=== Colonial era ===
The land constituting current-day Hampton Park was, by 1769, part of a plantation owned by John Gibbes and known as The Grove or Orange Grove Plantation.

=== Race course ===
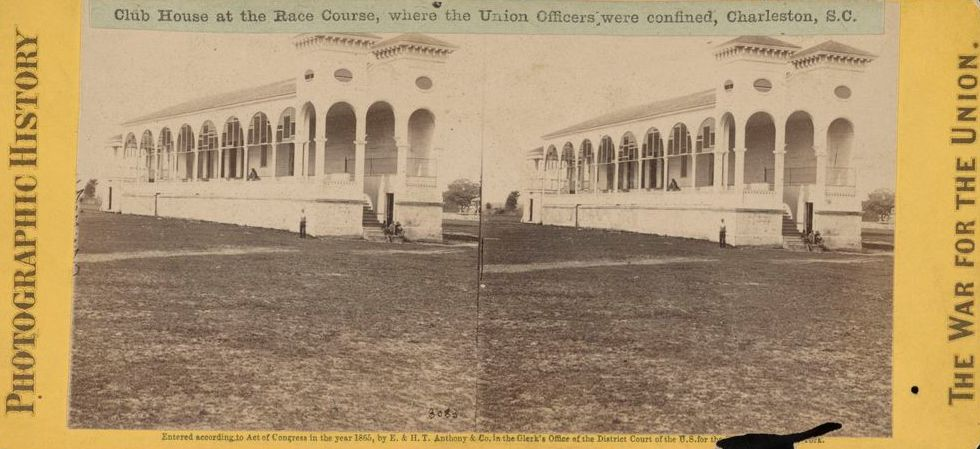
The grandstands at the racetrack were designed by Charles F. Reichart.

In 1835, part of Gibbes' plantation was acquired by the South Carolina Jockey Club, a group that developed the Washington Race Course on the site. An annual horse race in February attracted thousands of spectators who could watch the races from an Italianate grandstand designed by Charles F. Reichardt. Today, Mary Murray Drive is a 1-mile (1.6 km) parkway that circles Hampton Park in almost the exact location of the race track.

The Civil War caused a steep loss in the number of thoroughbred horses, and the following economic decline during the Reconstruction Era made horse racing less economically viable. The South Carolina Jockey Club eventually was disbanded in 1899.

=== Union cemetery ===
During the closing days of the American Civil War, the area was used as a prisoner-of-war camp. More than two hundred Union soldiers died in the camp and were buried in a mass grave at the site.

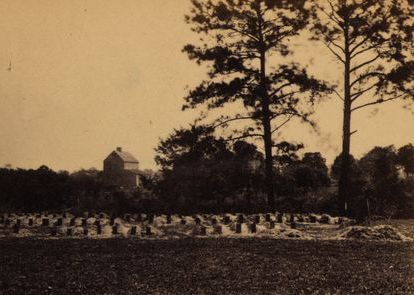
Union soldiers were buried behind the old racetrack's stands near the present intersection of Tenth Avenue and Mary Murray Drive.

In an article titled "The First Decoration Day", David W. Blight of Yale has written:

"The city was largely abandoned by white residents by late February. Among the first troops to enter and march up Meeting Street singing liberation songs was the 21st U. S. Colored Infantry; their commander accepted the formal surrender of the city.

"Thousands of black Charlestonians, most former slaves, remained in the city and conducted a series of commemorations to declare their sense of the meaning of the war. The largest of these events, and unknown until some extraordinary luck in my recent research, took place on May 1, 1865. During the final year of the war, the Confederates had converted the planters' horse track, the Washington Race Course and Jockey Club, into an outdoor prison. Union soldiers were kept in horrible conditions in the interior of the track; at least 257 died of exposure and disease and were hastily buried in a mass grave behind the grandstand. Some twenty-eight black workmen went to the site, re-buried the Union dead properly, and built a high fence around the cemetery. They whitewashed the fence and built an archway over an entrance on which they inscribed the words, 'Martyrs of the Race Course'.

"Then, black Charlestonians in cooperation with white missionaries and teachers, staged an unforgettable parade of 10,000 people on the slaveholders' race course. The symbolic power of the low-country planter aristocracy's horse track (where they had displayed their wealth, leisure, and influence) was not lost on the freedpeople. A New York Tribune correspondent witnessed the event, describing 'a procession of friends and mourners as South Carolina and the United States never saw before.'

"At 9 am on May 1, the procession stepped off led by three thousand black schoolchildren carrying arm loads of roses and singing 'John Brown's Body.' The children were followed by several hundred black women with baskets of flowers, wreaths and crosses. Then came black men marching in cadence, followed by contingents of Union infantry and other black and white citizens. As many as possible gathering in the cemetery enclosure; a children's choir sang 'We'll Rally around the Flag,' the 'Star-Spangled Banner,' and several spirituals before several black ministers read from scripture. No record survives of which biblical passages rung out in the warm spring air, but the spirit of Leviticus 25 was surely present at those burial rites: 'for it is the jubilee; it shall be holy unto you … in the year of this jubilee he shall return every man unto his own possession.'

"Following the solemn dedication the crowd dispersed into the infield and did what many of us do on Memorial Day: they enjoyed picnics, listened to speeches, and watched soldiers drill. Among the full brigade of Union infantry participating was the famous 54th Massachusetts and the 34th and 104th U.S. Colored Troops, who performed a special double-columned march around the gravesite. The war was over, and Decoration Day had been founded by African Americans in a ritual of remembrance and consecration. The war, they had boldly announced, had been all about the triumph of their emancipation over a slaveholders' republic, and not about state rights, defense of home, nor merely soldiers' valor and sacrifice."

By late April 1865, a white picket fence on which was written "The Martyrs of the Race Course" had been erected. On May 1, 1865, thousands of people, mainly newly freed blacks, processed to the site, and members of the 54th Massachusetts Volunteer Infantry marched around the site. The graves were decorated, speeches were offered, and celebrants enjoyed picnics in the area. This has been cited as the first Memorial Day celebration. By 1871, the cemetery was suffering neglect, and the soldiers were reinterred at the Beaufort and Florence National Cemeteries.

In their 2014 book The Genesis of the Memorial Day Holiday in America, Bellware and Gardiner take issue with Blight's characterization of this event as the first Memorial Day. While appealing in its inclusiveness, the event lacks the intention to begin an annual tradition. It was a cemetery dedication, not unlike the one at Gettysburg two years earlier. It was a celebration of the fall of Charleston done in conjunction with the floral-themed May Day holiday. This was a one-time event and not meant to reoccur. When asked by the New York Times for proof of his assertion that it influenced General John A. Logan's inauguration of the national holiday, Blight confessed he had none. Bellware and Gardiner credit Mary Ann Williams and the Ladies Memorial Association of Columbus, Georgia as the true originators of the holiday as abundant contemporaneous evidence from across the nation exists to substantiate the claim.

After the Civil War, the Jockey Club was unable to resume the popular racing season, and the land was leased for farming. In 1899, the Charleston Jockey Club disbanded, and its assets were given to the Charleston Library Society in 1900. The remnants of the racing structures were removed, but August Belmont was given the gates to the course which he had installed at Belmont Park in New York.

=== Trade exposition ===
At the turn of the century, Charleston hosted a regional trade exposition. The South Carolina Inter-State and West Indian Exposition of 1901–1902 was held on a large tract of land, including the former race course. The exposition opened on December 1, 1901, and attracted 674,086 attendees during its run. On April 9, 1902, President Theodore Roosevelt attended the exposition. Nevertheless, the trade exposition was a financial failure, and it closed on May 31, 1902.

== Park ==
The city of Charleston acquired a part of the exposition land for a park. The park is named in honor of Confederate General Wade Hampton III who, at the time of the Civil War was one of the largest enslavers in the South. After the Civil War, Hampton became a proponent of the Lost Cause movement, member of the Red Shirts and governor of South Carolina. The bandstand from the trade exposition, once located in the center of the park, was saved and moved to its present location at the east edge of the park at the foot of Cleveland St. In addition, the building at 30 Mary Murray Blvd., which is currently used as the city's Parks Department offices, was retained from the exposition, where it served as a tea house.

The city retained the services of Olmsted, Olmsted & Elliott, a landscaping firm from Boston. John Charles Olmsted, the adopted son of Frederick Law Olmsted, designed a plan for a park following his first visit to Charleston in 1906. At least part of his plans for long parkways along the Ashley River were disrupted when the city sold the approximately 200 acres (0.81 km^{2}) along the Ashley River, the Rhett Farm tract, to The Citadel for the relocation and expansion of its campus.

During the mid-20th century, the park included a zoo. It was opened in 1932, and an aviary was added about six years later. Most of the animals, including a lion, were donated to the zoo or bred at the zoo. By the mid-1960s, the zoo had become run-down. The zoo closed in 1975, and its contents were largely transferred to Charles Towne Landing, a new state park.

The city began a redevelopment of the park starting in the early 1980s. Following several years of decline in the park's condition, the city refocused landscaping efforts on the park, reduced crime, and installed a small snack stand designed by Sandy Logan.

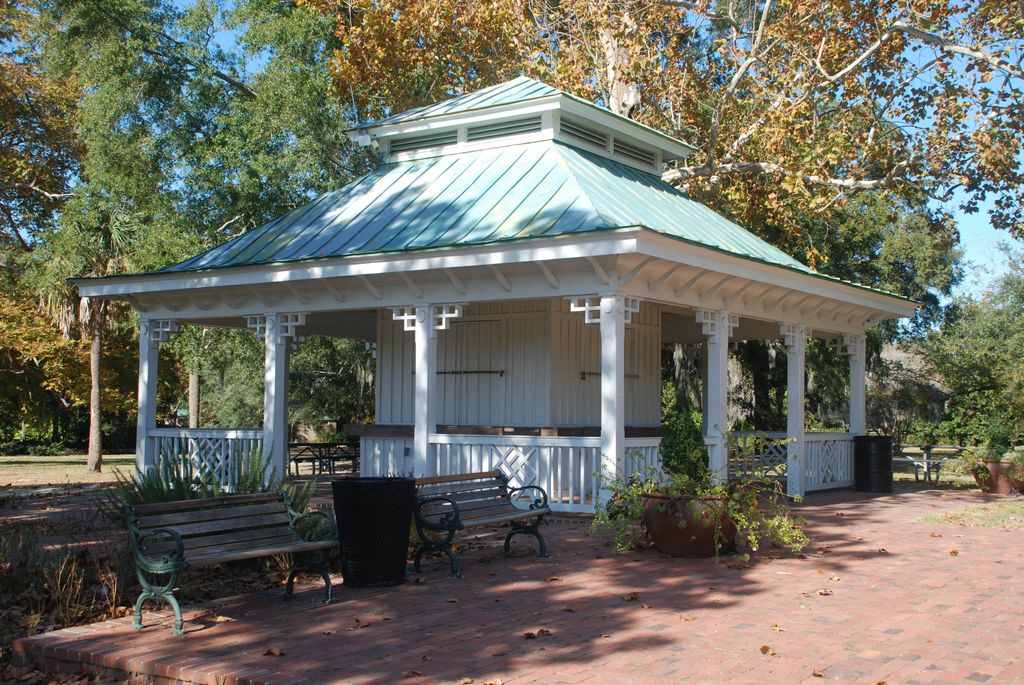
The concession stand had been shuttered for many years but was renovated in 2019 and renamed the "Rose Pavilion."

The refurbished park reopened in June 1984 after a year of improvement work when the Piccolo Spoleto finale was held at Hampton Park. The park is popular with walkers, joggers, and cyclists who use the 1-mile (1.6 km) perimeter road for exercise. In previous years, the park was the location for the finale of the Piccolo Spoleto Festival and in present-day remains the site for the MOJA Festival in addition to many weddings and other special events. The Finale of the Spoleto Festival USA has been moved to Middleton Place, a nearby historical plantation.

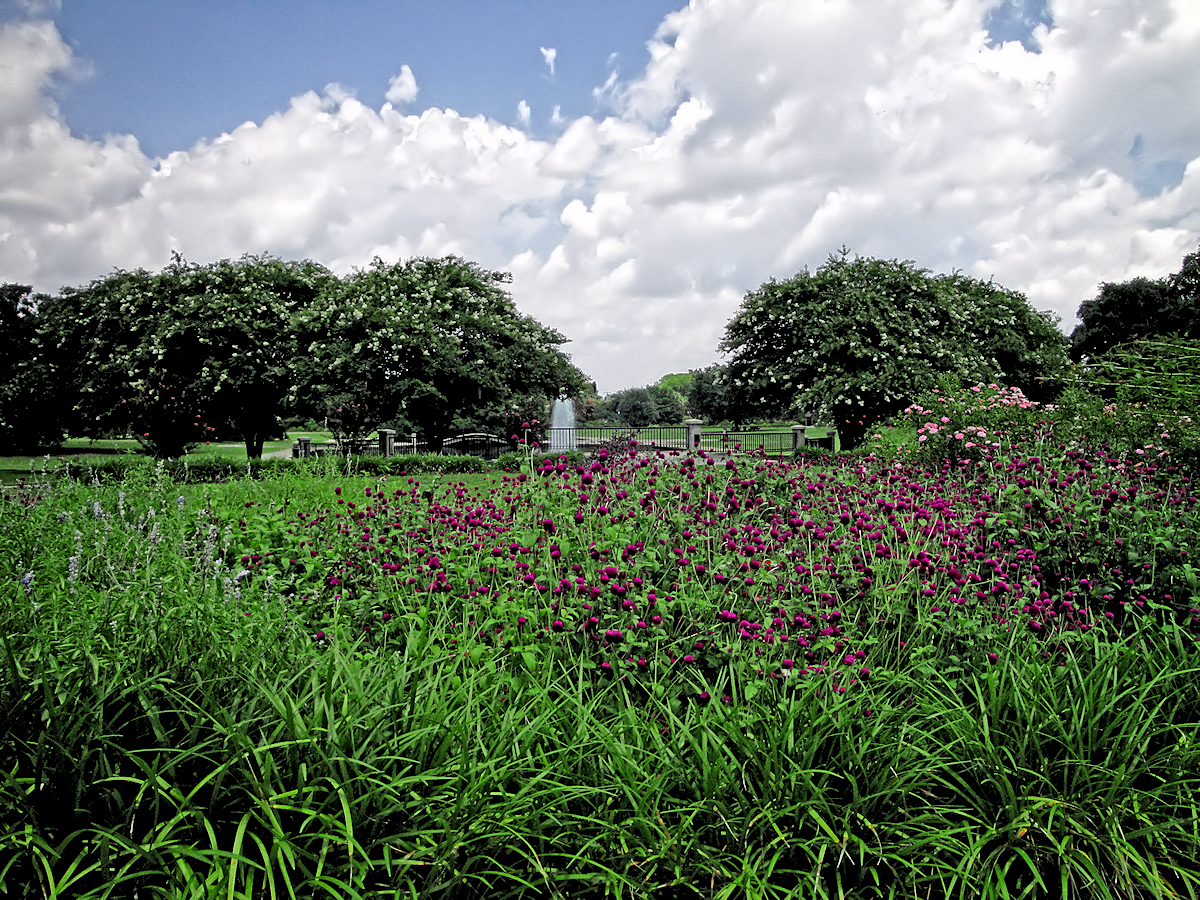
Charleston, South Carolina

In May 2015, a non-profit known as the Charleston Parks Conservancy unveiled a proposal to rework parts of the park. The plan would restore the c. 1901 structure at 30 Mary Murray Blvd. and rework the neighboring stables as part of a special events venue. In a different phase of the master plan, the stand-alone snack stand was designated to again become an active food station. The renovation of the snack stand was completed in 2019. The snack stand became the Rose Pavilion, a public gathering place.
