= Sottile Farms =

Former farm in south Florida

Coordinates: 25.7744°N 80.1906°W

Sottile Farms was a 30,000-acre land holding in South Florida owned by the Sottile family of Miami from 1930 to 1974 and incorporated as South Dade Farms. It was created by James Sottile, an Italian-American immigrant who was one of five brothers who immigrated to Charleston, South Carolina in the late nineteenth century.

Sottile donated 20 acres of land on the Florida East Coast Railway tracks for the construction of the Florida City State Farmers Market in 1939. He also donated 80 acres for the South Dade Labor Camp on Campbell Drive near the air base and 1,200 acres in 1937 for the Homestead Bayfront Park. The Homestead Bayfront Park has been called "The Real South Beach".
