= Miniature Railway Company =

Coordinates: 40.715257°N 74.0079741°W

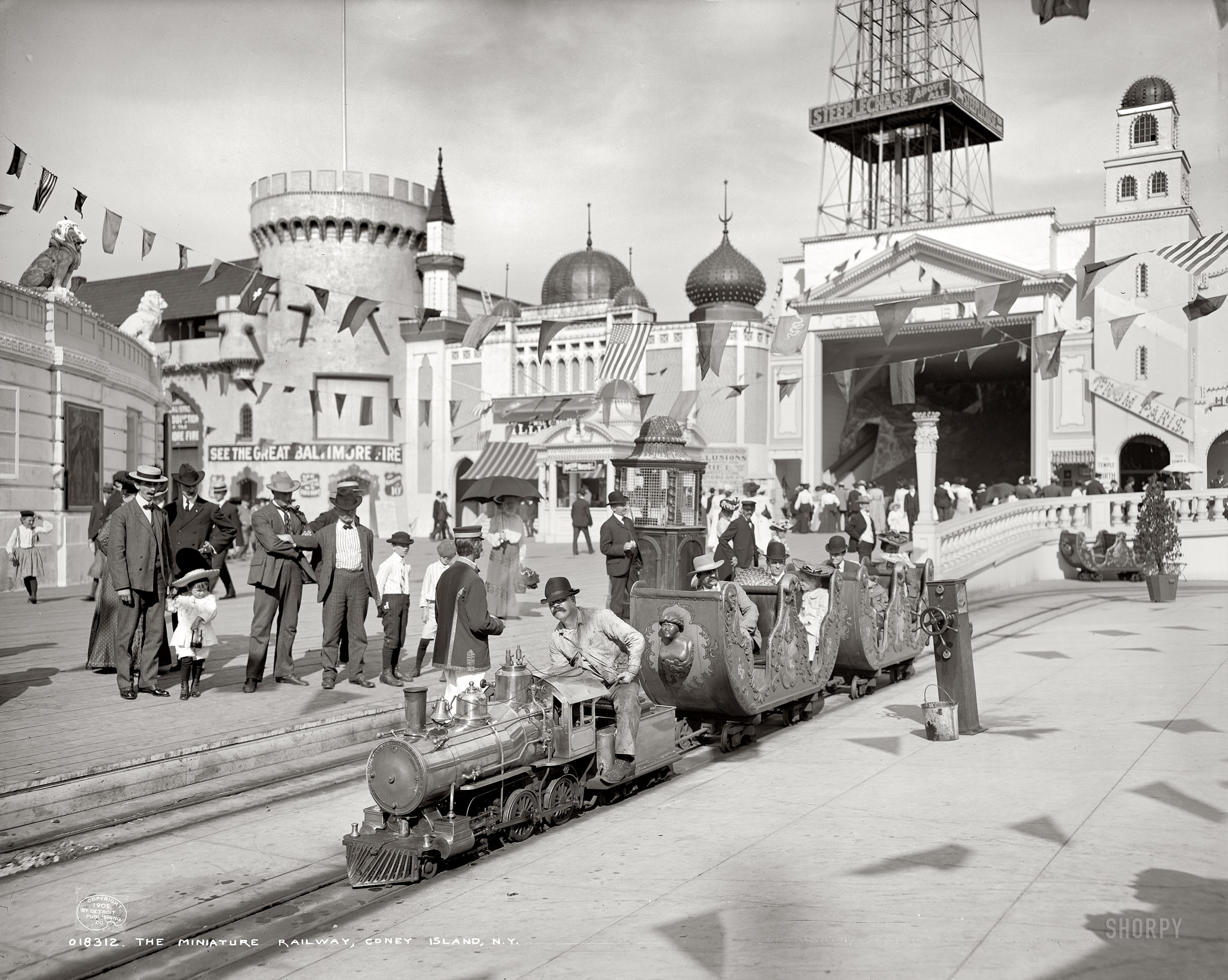
The Miniature Railway at Dreamland on Coney Island (Note: The 15 in (381 mm) gauge Class D Heavy design was developed before the 1904 Louisiana Purchase Exposition. The two broken studs at the top and left hand side of the smoke box cover plate fixed to the front end of the boiler were probably overtightened, when it was removed for tube cleaning. The embossing shows "THE MINIATURE RAILWAY CO. - 407 BROADWAY, NEW YORK, U.S.A. - 1904")

The Miniature Railway Company on Broadway in Manhattan, New York, operated their ridable miniature railways at four World Expositions around 1900 and delivered them to many parks throughout the world.

== History ==
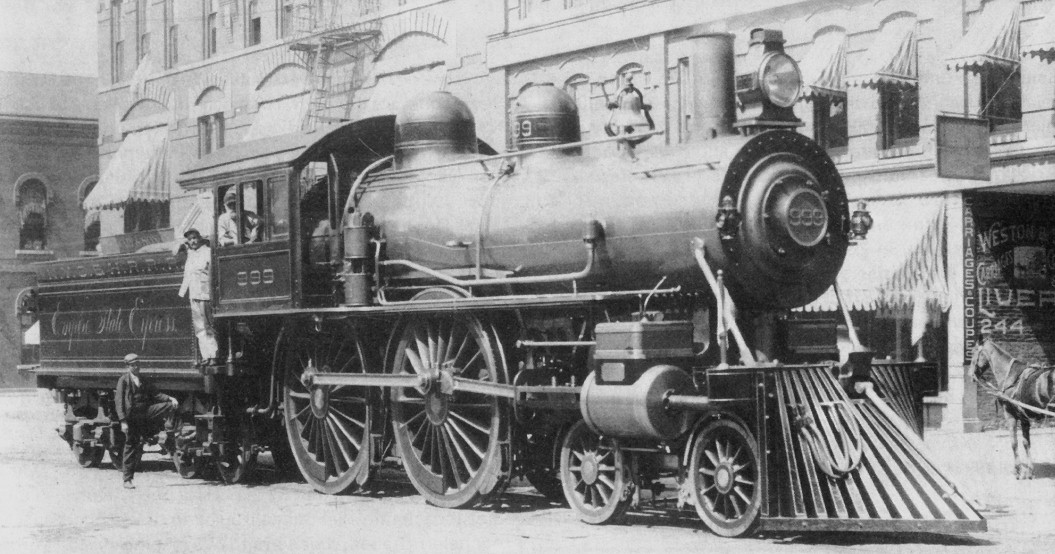
Raw model: NYC 999 in Syracuse

The company was founded in 1898 by Timothy Cagney and his brothers David and John, after they had run a ticket brokerage company known as Cagney Bros. in New York in the early 1890s. They had begun building steam locomotives in 1894, and their popular 15 in (381 mm) gauge 4-4-0 was a crude replica of New York Central and Hudson River Railroad No. 999, the first in the world to travel over 100 mph (161 km/h). They lived in Jersey City, but their office was at 301, 407 and finally 74 Broadway in New York, until it was relocated to New Jersey.

The locomotives were manufactured by the McGarigle Machine Company initially in Niagara Falls, New York and later in Jersey City. This company belonged to Thomas and Peter McGarigle, whose sister Winifred was married to Timothy Cagney. The two companies worked very closely together for several years on various projects. Their Class C was 12 5/8 in (321 mm) gauge, their Class D, which was upgraded in 1903, was 15 in (381 mm) gauge and their Class E, which was introduced in 1904, was 1 ft 10 in (559 mm) gauge.

By the 1920s the Cagney Bros. had absorbed the miniature railway portion of the McGarigle Machine Company under the name of The Cagney Brothers' Amusement Company Niagara Falls Plant. In total, the group of companies built about 1300 locomotives in many different sizes and gauges, before it went out of business in 1948.

== Product range ==
The company's speciality was the manufacture of light steam locomotives with varying sizes and designs for many gauges, wide or narrow. The locomotives were well adapted for industrial purposes, where ordinary locomotives were unsuitable or too expensive. Logging railroads of the Miniature Railway Co. were in use in the southern Atlantic and Gulf states, the northern lake districts and on the Pacific coast. They were exported to the United Kingdom, Latin America, Russia, South Africa, Japan, Thailand, Australia and New Zealand.

Two of Cagney's most important installations were two gold-plated trains with steam locomotives built for the King of Siam, and the Trip Around the World exhibit at the 1939 New York World's Fair at a cost of $200.000. One locomotive was exported in 1902 to the Blakesley Miniature Railway in Northamptonshire in the vicinity of Wenman Joseph Bassett-Lowke's company Miniature Railways of Great Britain Ltd in Northampton, which began in 1904 to manufacture their own series of 15 in (381 mm) gauge locomotives. One 15 inches (380 mm) gauge model locomotive and three carriages for 18 passengers was exported in 1906 to Australia, to run in circles on Manly’s beachfront.

== Trans-Mississippi Exposition ==
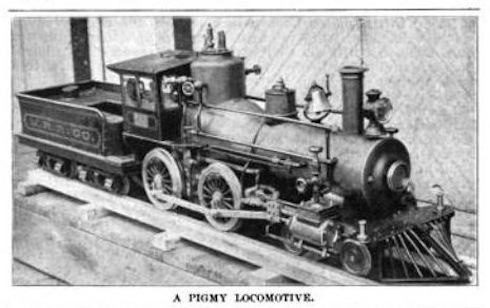
'A Pigmy Locomotive' at the Trans-Mississippi Exposition

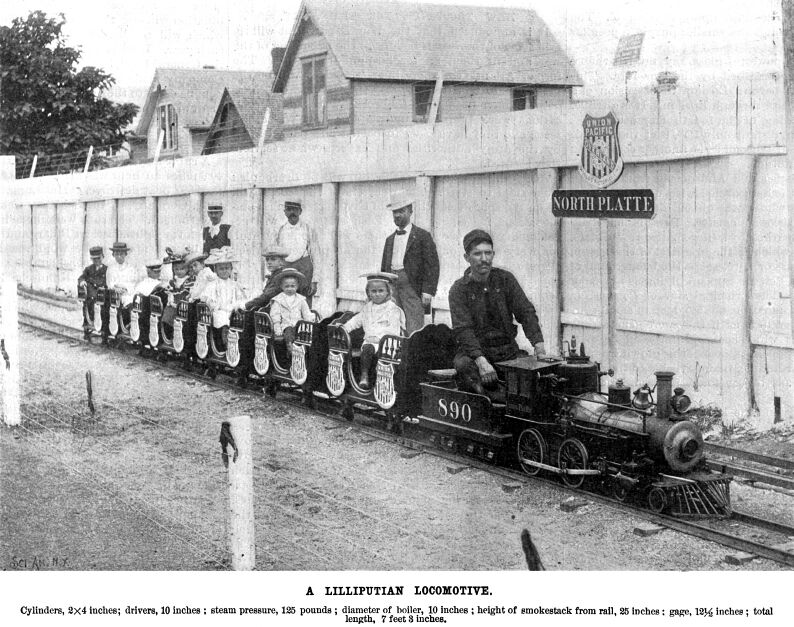
'A Lilliputian Locomotive' at the Trans-Mississippi Exposition

The Miniature Railway Company obtained the probably smallest locomotive ever made (at the time) for drawing passenger cars from Thomas E. McGarigle of Niagara Falls. This steam locomotive was used from June 1 to November 1 of 1898 at the Trans-Mississippi Exposition in Omaha, Nebraska, and, in all, six locomotives were ordered by the company under one contract.

The height of the locomotive from the surface of the rail to the top of the stack was 25 inches (635 mm), and the gauge was 12 1/2 in (318 mm). The cylinders were 2 by 4 inches (51 mm × 102 mm). The boiler was made of steel, held 24 imperial gallons (29 US gal; 110 L) of water, had a capacity of 1 1/2 hp (1.1 kW) and was tested to 300 pounds per square inch (21 bar). The firebox was 10 by 10 inches (254 mm × 254 mm). The weight of this little engine +1/was about 600 pounds (270 kg), and it ran on a 3/4 square inch (4.8 cm^{2}) rail. Hard coal was used as fuel. The capacity of the locomotive was 10 cars, each containing two persons, or about 4,000 pounds (1,800 kg). The locomotive was equipped with sandbox, bell, etc., and had a steam brake between the drivers. One man, whose position was on a seat on top of the tender, operated the engine. The scale on which the locomotive was built was about one-seventh that of one of the New York Central's largest engines, and as it stood in the shop it had a very businesslike appearance.

== Pan-American Exposition ==
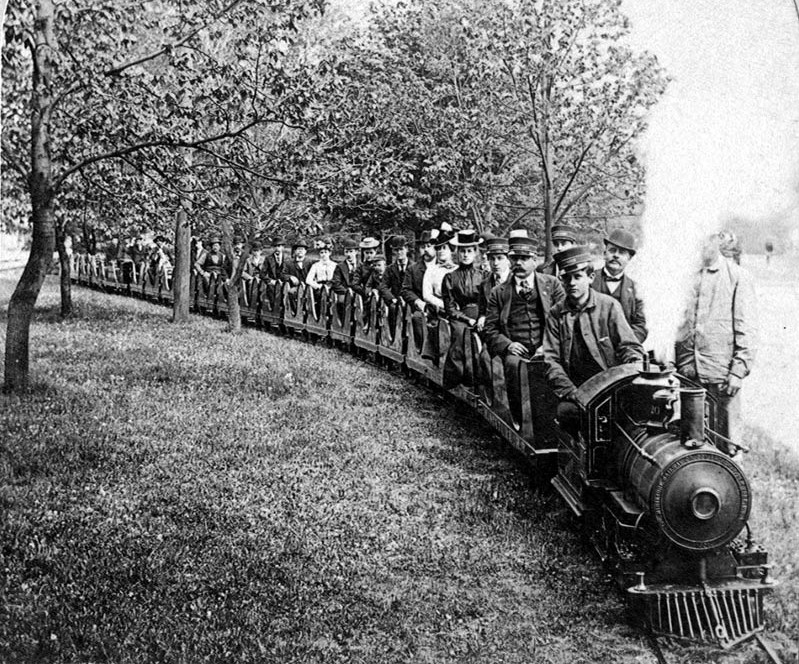
Miniature railway at the Pan-American Exposition

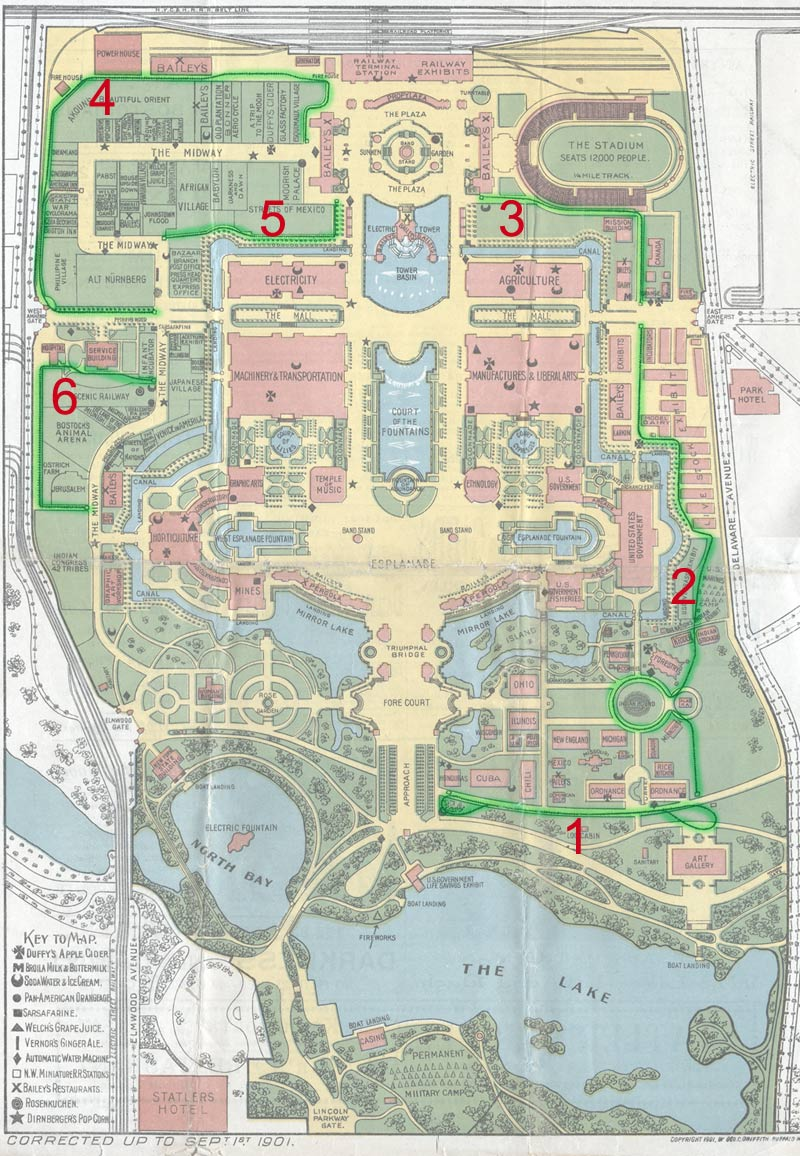
Track of the miniature railway at the Pan-American Exposition

The Cagney brothers built and operated a 15 in (381 mm) gauge miniature railway at the Pan-American Exposition held in Buffalo, New York, United States, from May 1 until November 2, 1901. With a ticket that cost 10 cents, passengers could board small, open cars and ride on six sections to the end of the line. (Note: Wikimedia Commons has media related to Pan-American Exposition Miniature Railway.)

The coal-heated steam locomotives of the Class D series had 16 inches (410 mm) diameter driving wheels, a weight of 1,000 pounds (450 kg) and a height of 36 inches (0.91 m) from the surface of the rail track to the top of the smokestack. They had a Kortling injector and a special pump. The cylinders were 2 1/4 by 4 inches (57 mm × 102 mm). The boiler was made of best quality 1/4 inch (6.4 mm) thick steel, held 15 imperial gallons (68 L) of water and was tested to 400 pounds per square inch (28 bar). It had a diameter of 14 inches (0.36 m) and held 15 imperial gallons (68 L) of water. The tubes were 24 inches (0.61 m) long and the fire box was 16 inches (0.41 m) long.

The tender was of the two-truck type with 6 inches (150 mm) diameter wheels and had a length of 3 foot 6 inches (1.07 m) and a width of 22 inches (0.56 m). It was made from iron and supplied with wrench, shovel, flue cleaner and rake. It had a capacity of 25 imperial gallons (110 L) and a weight of 200 pounds (91 kg). The total length of locomotive and tender was 9 foot 6 inches (2.90 m).

Two different types of cars for two or eight passengers were used. The larger cars were each 6 feet (1.8 m) long and 24 inches (0.61 m) wide, and provided 8 seats for adults, if two passengers sat side by side.

== Charleston Exposition ==
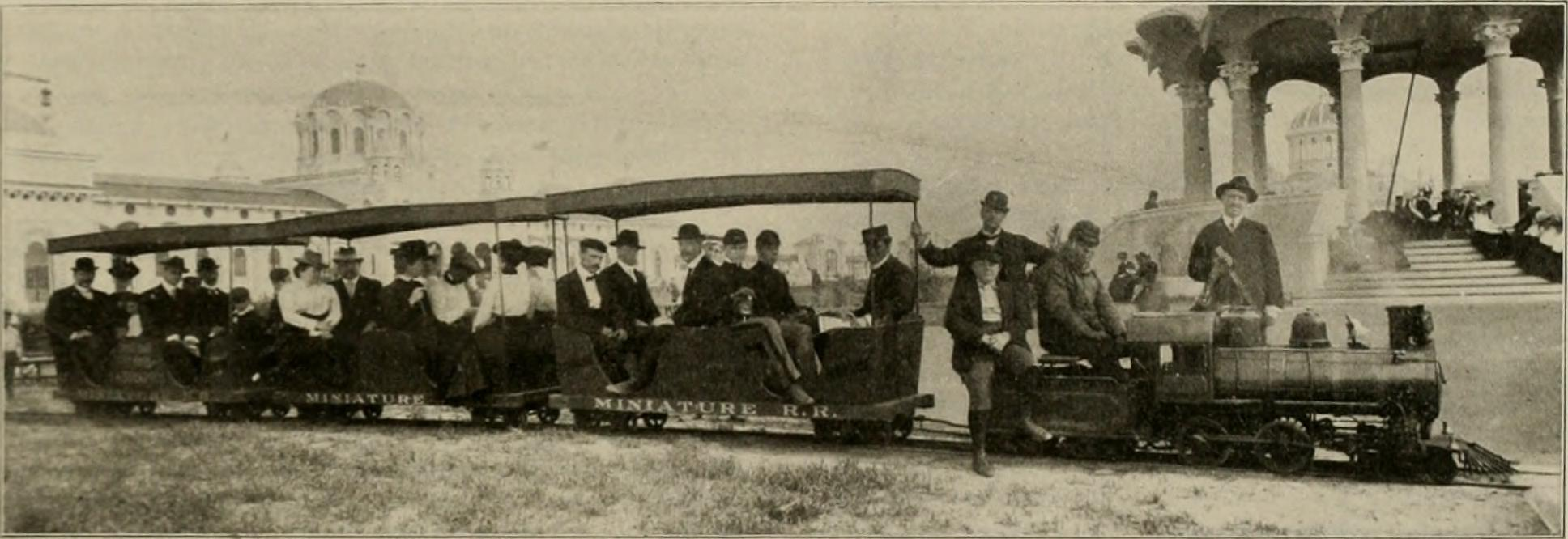
Miniature railway at the Charleston Exposition, 1901/02

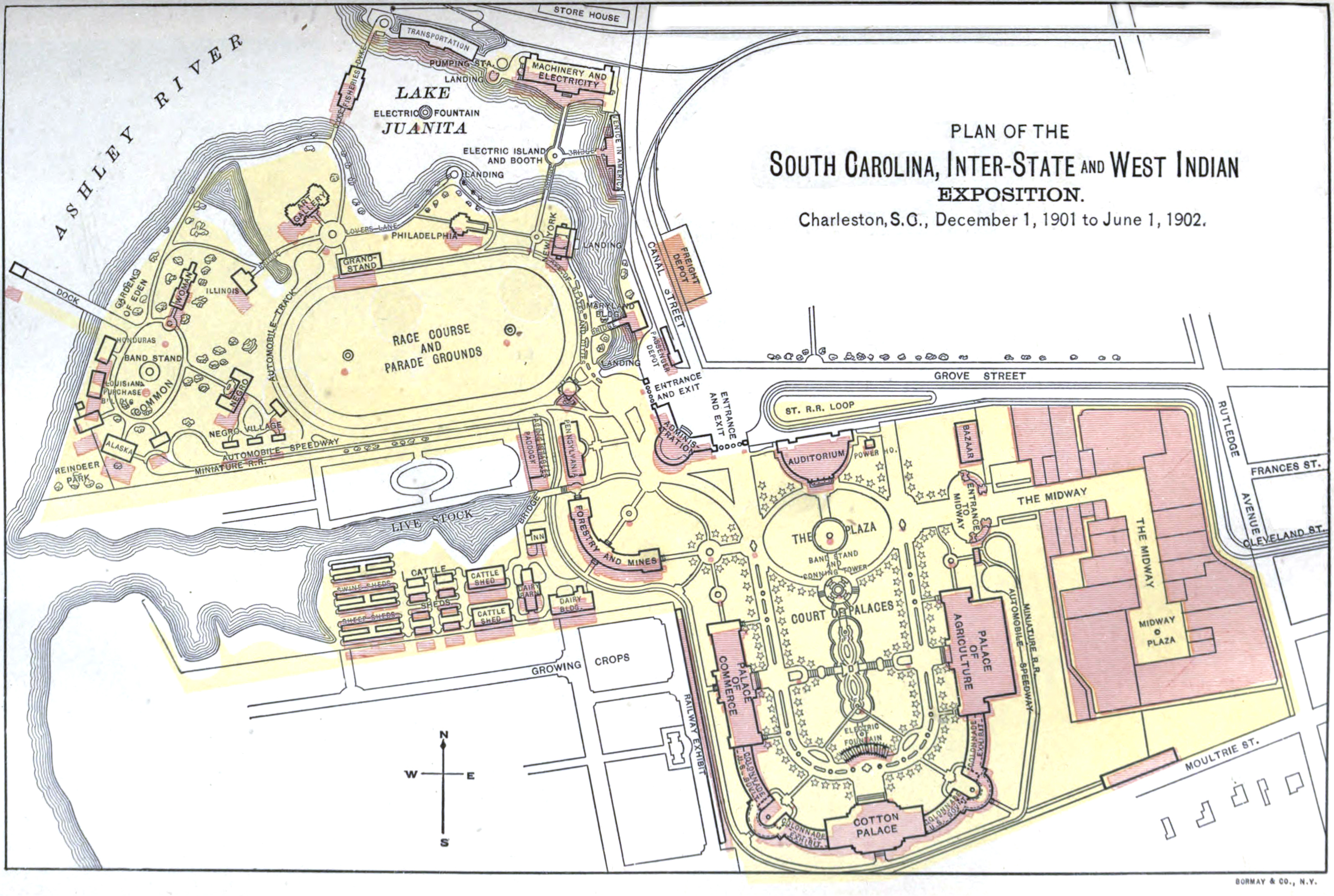
Track of the miniature railway at the Charleston Exposition

At the Charleston Exposition from December 1, 1901 to June 20, 1902 the lilliputian railways installed by the Miniature Railway Co. comprised one of the most popular attractions and best-paying amusement features on the grounds. The routes touched all points of interest from the Sunken Gardens and the Court of Palaces to the hoky-poky dance floor in the headquarters. Patrons found these baby trains an indispensable convenience as well as a joyful novelty in the manner of transportation.

The outfit consisted of a locomotive and tender, with a total length or 9 feet 11 inches (3.02 m), weighing 1,200 pounds (540 kg), and cars 6 feet (1.8 m) long and 24 inches (0.61 m) wide, weighing 125 pounds (57 kg) each, all as complete in detail and as business-like in aspect as a transcontinental express. The difference, and that was in favor of the Lilliput, was that on this ideal system there were no baggage-men to badger one, no porters that one must tip, nor any man with a megaphone voice to assail one with magazines and samples of chewing gum.

== Louisiana Purchase Exposition ==
In 1903 the Cagney Bros. Co. built the 8 miles (13 km) long miniature railroad on the grounds of the Louisiana Purchase Exposition, and operated this from April 30 to December 1, 1904. Timothy Cagney was listed as President, and Peter McGarigle as Chief Engineer. They operated twenty 15 in (381 mm) gauge 4-4-0s and four 1 ft 10 in (559 mm) gauge 4-4-0s as public transportation on the fairgrounds.
