= Tom Varley =

Collector of steam-powered vehicles

- Died: 12 December 1990
- Occupation: Caravan park operator
- Known for: Preserving steam wagons
- Spouse: Susan
- Children: David, Terence, Catherine

Tom Varley was a collector, restorer and preserver of steam-powered road vehicles, known for the Tom Varley Collection, a steam museum mostly of steam wagons, "a lasting legacy of which [British steam road enthusiasts] can be proud".

Tom Varley initially worked in dry stone walling, setting up his own company. After moving into farming, he then set up the Todber Caravan Park at Gisburn, in the high Pennines of Lancashire. The steam museum was housed in a barn alongside the caravans. The collection was best known from its frequent appearances at steam rallies through the 1970s and '80s. Varley's wagons were recognisable from their fine paintwork and signwriting, each named, often prefixed Pendle ....

Six of his rarer, and often unique survivors, were re-imported from Australia before restoration.

Tom Varley died on December 12, 1990. His contribution to the preservation of steam vehicles in the UK has been widely recognised.

== List of vehicles ==
These vehicles have at one point formed part of the Tom Varley collection. Since his death, some have now been sold on to other owners, and may have been renamed.

Name	Maker	Type	Year	Works Nº	Registration	Details
1 Pendle Lady	Sentinel	S4 steam waggon	1934	9003	VE9963	
2 Pendle Queen	Yorkshire	3 ton steam wagon	1917	940	U4245	Tom's second steam wagon, rebuilt in 1970. Now owned by Tom's son, David Varley, repainted red and exhibited under his name.
3 Pendle Prince	Fowler	steam wagon	1931	19708	UB8660	The last known surviving Fowler steam wagon. Rebuilt from remains found in scrap pile in Leeds. Now owned by Tom's son Terry Varley and run by his grandson Jason Varley.
5 Pendle King	Sentinel	DG6P steam waggon	1931	8562	FD6603	11 ton Sentinel DG6P.
7 Pendle Maid	Yorkshire	2 ton steam wagon	1905	117	CA170	Rebuilt in 1973 by Tom Varley. Restored from bare chassis recovered in Wales. Now owned by John Ward and renamed as Denby Maiden.
8 Pendle Laddie	Yorkshire	WG Tractor	1927	2118	UA1163	Yorkshire WG flexible six wheeler, 'Pendle Laddie'. Rebuilt by Tom Varley from parts recovered by Walter Fearnley. This vehicle was supplied to the Leeds Corporation Electricity Department as a cable carrier.
9 Pendle Knight	Robey & Co.	'Express' steam tractor	1929	43388	VL983	Later fitted with pneumatic front wheels. Now renamed as Kernow Knight.
12 Her Majesty	Atkinson	"Colonial Type" 6 ton steam wagon	1918	72	CK209	The last known survivor of the more than 500 Atkinson steam wagons built, it is powered by a uniflow engine and has chain-drive transmission. Following its completion as a new vehicle, it was exported to Western Australia, where it was operated by a Perth brewery and later a number of other operators, including a Wiluna gold mine. It was retired during World War II, and then lay derelict until 1971, when the Shire of Wiluna collected its remains for display in a local museum. However, the Shire later decided not to restore it. In 1975, Varley first heard of the remains, and after protracted negotiations they were delivered to him in Gisburn in January 1976. Varley and some fellow enthusiasts then fully restored the vehicle, including by having replica single-ram 3-way tipping-gear made for it with assistance from Bromilow & Edwards, who had made the original gear. Upon completion of the restoration in March 1977, the vehicle was named Her Majesty, in recognition of the Silver Jubilee of Queen Elizabeth II. Later sold to Preston Steam Services in Kent.
18 Yorkshire Lad / Queen Anne	Yorkshire	WG steam wagon	1927	2128	UA1788	Shaft-drive Yorkshire wagon. Originally a chain-drive WG model, this was restored by Walter Fearnley using the shaft-drive gearbox from a later WJ model before being purchased by Tom Varley. The original gearbox and drive was then used for WG 2118. Now owned by M.G. Wines of Somerset as 'Yorkshire Lad'
His Lordship	Burrell	10NHP Showman's Road Locomotive	1913	3444	CK3403	Sold in 1996 to J. G. Atkinson of the Scarborough Fair Collection.
	Foden	Colonial steam wagon	1913	4086	M4848	5 ton "Colonial" steam wagon. Sold new to C H Curtis, Manly, Australia, then to "Glenreagh " Lake Cargelligo. Recovered and restored by Tom Varley in the 1970s. Sold later to Germany, then returned to Mike Plumb, Norfolk.
	Aveling & Porter	FGPA steam wagon	1922	9282	D3777	FGPA steam wagon built by Garrett at Leiston. Exported to Australia and recovered by Tom Varley in 1978. Later sold to Peter Rigg of Todmorden.
Pendle Princess	Garrett	4CD showmans tractor	1919	33705	BJ4788	New to Stone Court Brick and Tile Works, Pembury, Kent as tractor. Converted to showmans tractor in preservation before being bought by Tom Varley. Now in Japan at the Bandai Museum.
Lady Betty	Fowler	8NHP Showman's Road Locomotive	1902	9381	WR6770	Originally supplied to John Smith's Brewery at Tadcaster with short wheelbase, and converted in working life to showman's engine. Converted back to road locomotive and used for agricultural purposes before being re-converted in preservation.
Pendle Witch	Aveling & Porter	Class BTD Road Roller	1916	8727	TC2173	Exhibited at the 1916 RASE Show, New To Morecambe UDC, later John Ball of Forton, Isaac Ball of Wharles and then to Walton Le Dale UDC. Purchased from them by Tom Varley in 1969 for use building the roadways around his Caravan park. later passed on to Alwyn Rogers, Alan Mountfield and Currently owned by Graham Townsend of Southport.
24	Howard	two-speed traction engine	1872	201		Re-imported from Australia in 1980 Sold, along with the Aveling & Porter, to Peter Rigg of Todmorden.
	Foster	5 ton steam wagon	1921	14470	SV5506	The last surviving Foster wagon. Re-imported from Australia by Tom Varley in 1983. Now named William Tritton
	Sentinel	Super steam waggon	1924	5260	RS5540	Supplied new to Aberdeen Coal & Shipping Co, and operated until the 1960's. Originally preserved in Aberdeen, later owned by Tom Varley.
