= Steam wagon =

Steam-powered truck for carrying freight

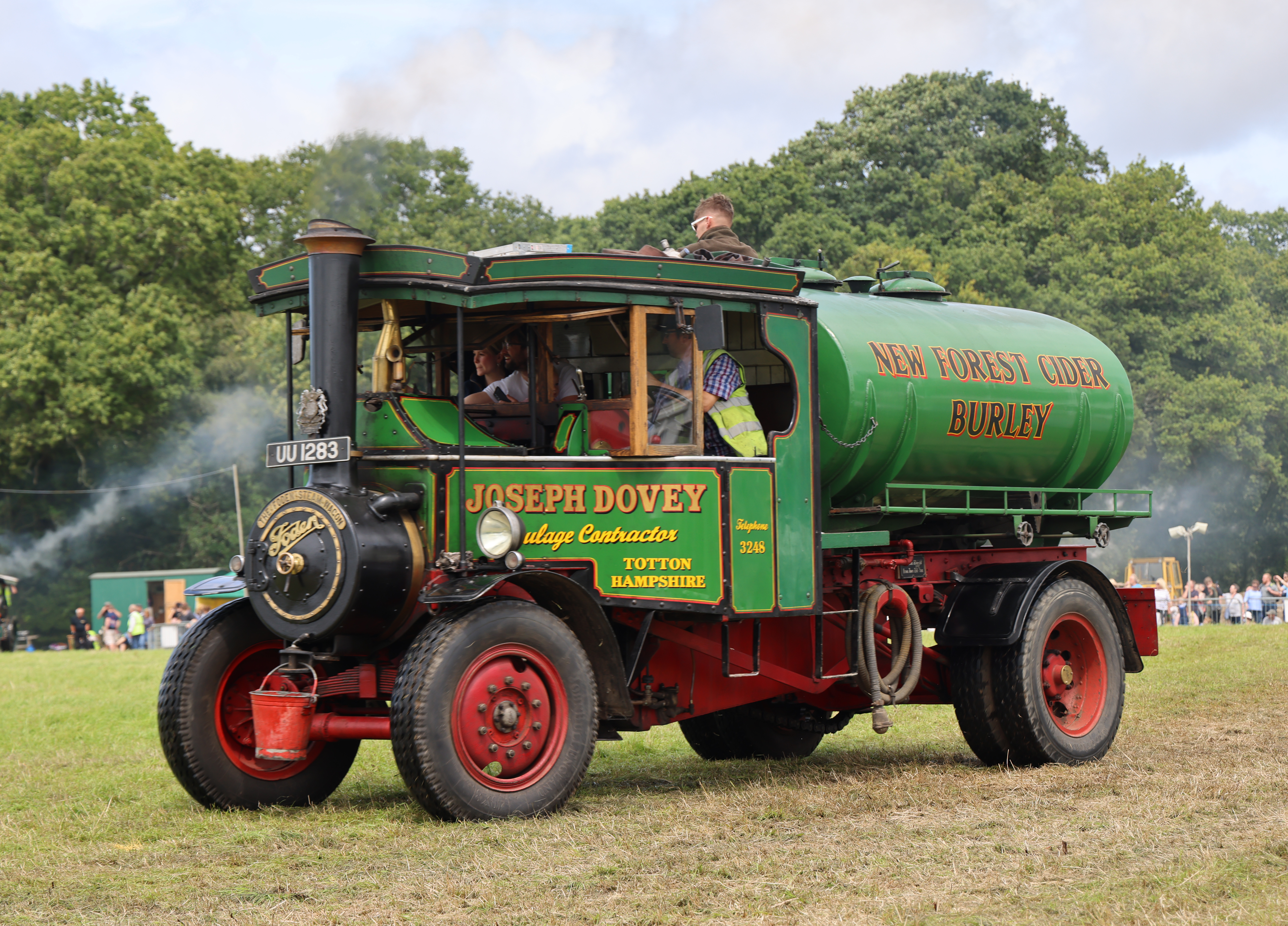
Foden C type steam wagon of 1929 overtype steam lorry

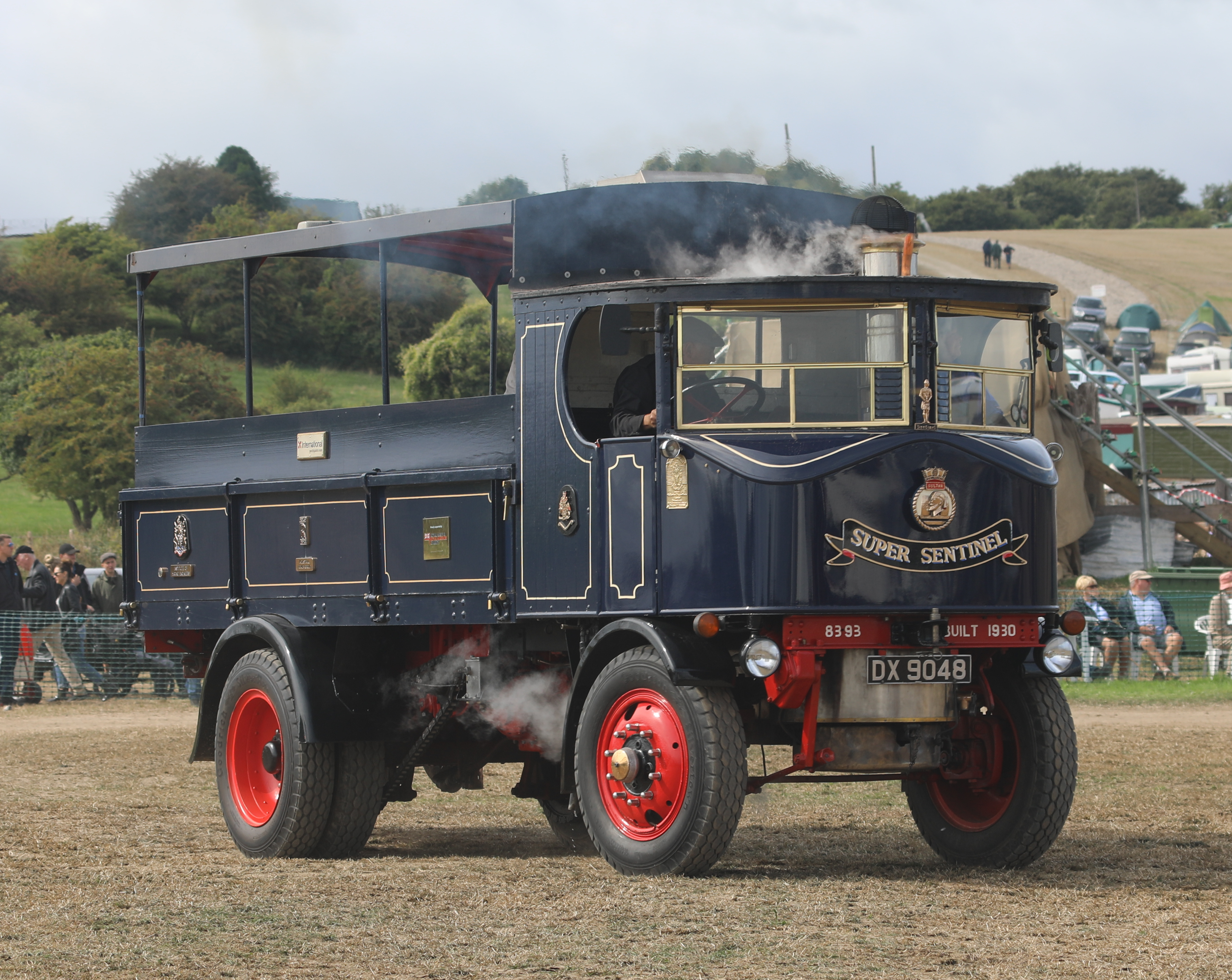
Preserved 1930 built "Super Sentinel" undertype steam lorry

A steam wagon (or steam lorry, steam waggon or steamtruck) is a steam-powered truck for carrying freight. It was the earliest form of lorry (truck) and came in two basic forms: overtype and undertype, the distinction being the position of the engine relative to the boiler. Manufacturers tended to concentrate on one form or the other.

Steam wagons were a widespread form of powered road traction for commercial haulage in the early part of the twentieth century, although they were a largely British phenomenon, with few manufacturers outside Great Britain. Competition from internal-combustion-powered vehicles and adverse legislation meant that few remained in commercial use beyond the Second World War.

Although the majority of steam wagons have been scrapped, a significant number have been preserved in working order and may be seen in operation at steam fairs, particularly in the UK.

== Design features ==
The steam wagon came in two basic forms:

- The overtype design drew much from traction engine practice, and used an engine unit that consisted of a locomotive type boiler, with the cylinders, crank shaft, and motion mounted on top of the boiler. The rear axle was typically driven by a chain from the engine unit. The engine unit was attached to a chassis with the load carrying body attached.
- The undertype designs used a conventional chassis, and had a self-contained engine mounted separately from the boiler, typically (although not exclusively) under the chassis. To allow for firing and water management, the boiler remained in the cab. Some of the earliest wagons, such as the first generation of wagons built by Mann used locomotive type boilers, and a double-ended transverse boiler was used by the Yorkshire Patent Steam Wagon Co., but the most commonly used boiler was some form of vertical water tube boiler - the most widespread example being the Sentinel boiler.

Both forms were built in parallel from the early 1900s to the early 1930s. The purported advantages of overtype wagons were their simplicity and familiarity for users of traction engines, whereas undertypes were marketed as having a much better view of the road due to the forward position of the driver.

=== Wheels ===
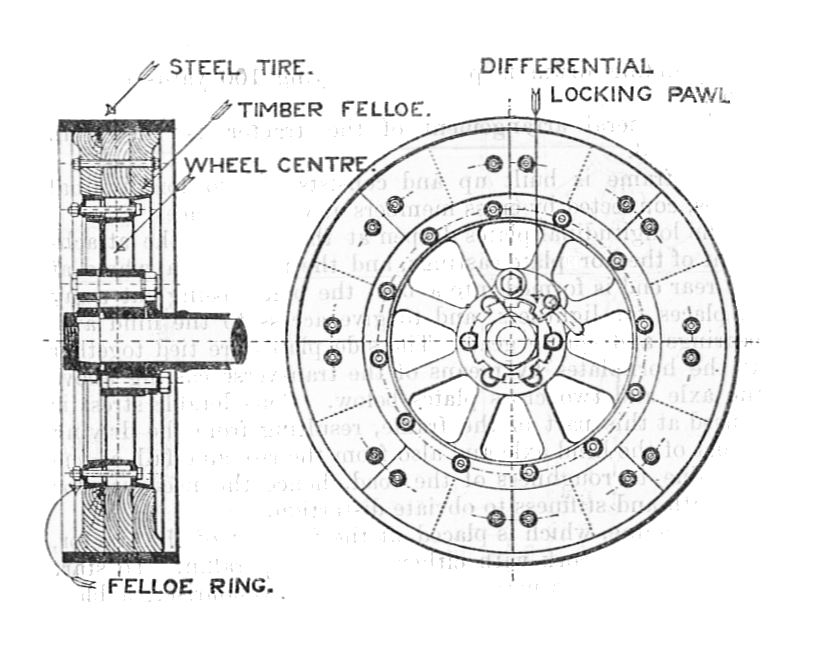
Alley & MacLellan wheel with wooden felloes around a cast steel centre, as used on their Sentinel waggons

Construction of wheels was a significant challenge, as wheels on horse-drawn vehicles had only been responsible for weight of the vehicle, but were now also required to transmit the power to the road. The earliest examples typically used either built up steel traction engine-type type wheels, or wooden artillery wheels, both types using steel bands for the contact with the road. Some variations were used, such as the composite wheels used by Alley & MacLellan on early Sentinels, using a cast steel centre with wooden felloes, or steel plate wheels as used by Mann. As press-on solid rubber tyres of sufficient capacity became available around 1910, the wheel designs were updated to allow for their use. This meant making the wheel smaller, so that with the added rubber, the wheel would remain approximately the same overall diameter. By the 1920s the predominant wheel design was a cast steel centre with a pressed on solid rubber tyre. By the late 1920s pneumatic tyres had evolved to the point that they were capable of sustaining the tyre loads imposed by steam wagons. Their advantages were a smoother ride, and due to the lower loading applied to the road, were subject to lower taxes. Some late steam wagons by Sentinel, Foden, Garrett and Yorkshire were built with pneumatic tyres, and steam wagons that remained in haulage use after increases in taxation in 1934 were typically converted to pneumatic tyres.

=== Cabs ===
The earliest steam wagons typically had very spartan accommodation for the crew - often not even including a roof to protect them from the weather. By around 1910 such features were more common, but the cabs were still open at the sides and front. As speeds increased, in the early 1920s companies began to fit glazed windscreens to provide more protection, and the final designs of steam wagon from the late 1920s and 1930s typically included fully glazed cabs with side windows.

== History ==
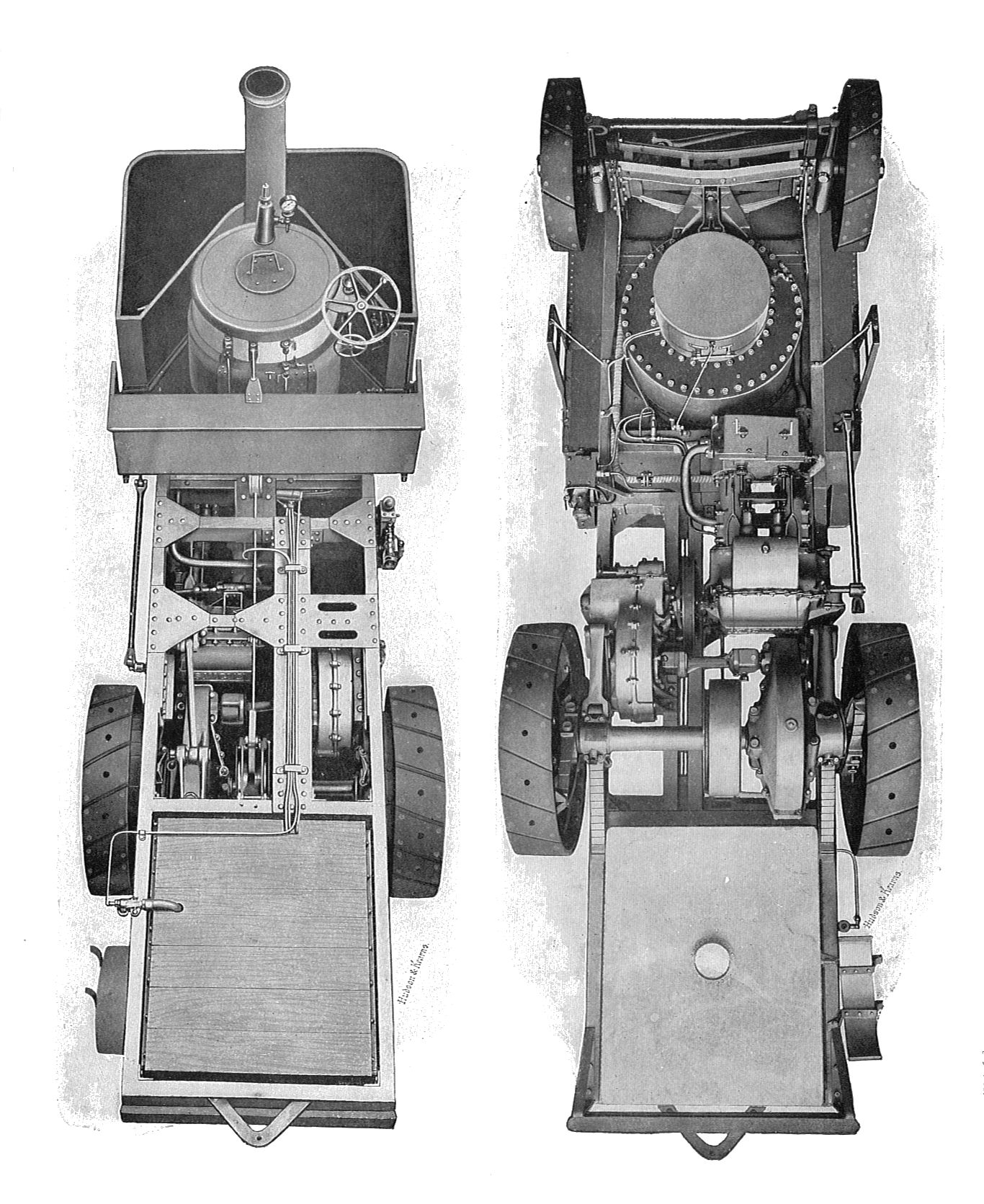
Early Thornycroft Steam wagon, above and below

=== Early years ===
Following a relaxation in the legislation covering the use of steam-powered vehicles on common roads, manufacturers started to investigate the possibility of using steam power for a self-contained goods vehicle. Prior to this point, goods were carried in a trailer towed behind a traction engine, or more frequently a horse. The first steam wagon was produced in 1870 and occasional experiments continued over the next two decades.

Despite legislation that severely restricted the unladen weight of wagons, steam wagon production began to flourish in the UK in the last decade of the 19th century. Manufacturers such as the Lancashire Steam Motor Company (later Leyland), Coulthard, Mann, Straker and Thornycroft were among the companies that began producing wagons at this time.

In 1901, several makers competed in the Aldershot trials for the War Department, with Thornycroft's gear driven undertype coming out as the winner ahead of Foden's early chain driven overtype. Both manufacturers built on this early success, with Foden patenting the essential features of the overtype wagon and deterring other manufacturers from attempting such a design.

Around this time the Yorkshire Patent Steam Wagon company began producing undertype wagons with their distinctive pattern of double ended boiler. In this period, many manufacturers made attempts to build steam wagons, often with only moderate success.

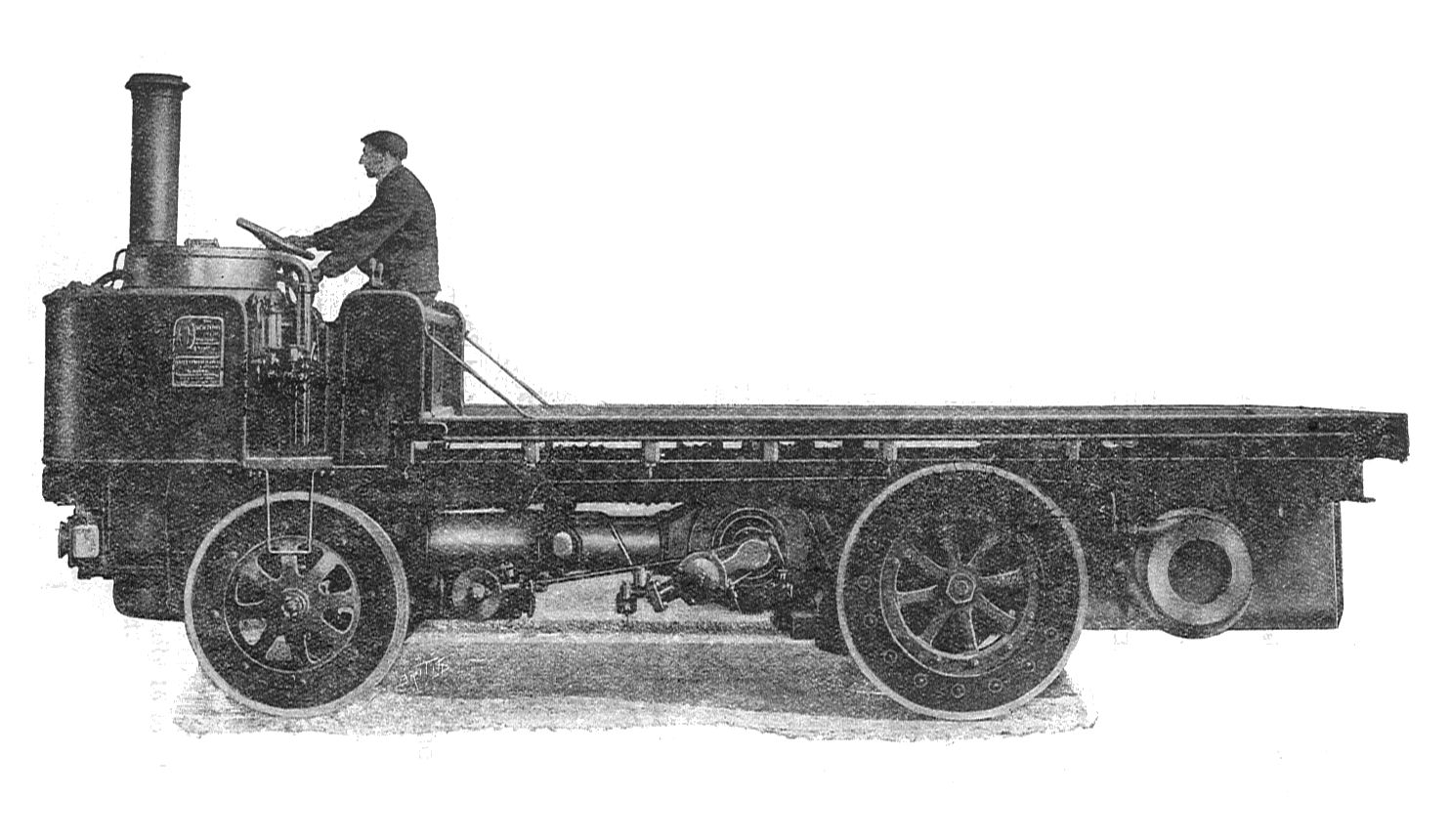
Early Alley & McLellan "Sentinel" steam waggon

=== Expansion ===
In 1906, Alley & McLellan launched the first Sentinel wagon, driven by a well-designed, rugged engine with poppet valves, and an effective superheated vertical cross watertube boiler. It was a revolutionary design, and immediately took a large share of the market.

Also in 1906, Wallis & Steevens produced an overtype wagon that Foden viewed as an infringement of their patent. The matter led to a patent infringement case. In 1908 the matter was decided in Wallis & Steevens' favour, and upheld on appeal. This naturally led to a great expansion of overtype wagon production, with prominent traction engine companies drawing on their experience building steam tractors to produce wagons, with varying success.

The great transport demands of the World War I led to several of the premier wagon manufacturers – at the time, Sentinel, Clayton & Shuttleworth, Foden and Garrett, having almost their entire production ordered directly for the war effort. This opened up the home market for many other manufacturers to fill the vacuum. A company that entered the market in this period was Atkinson, with their undertype wagon design launched in 1916.

=== Zenith ===
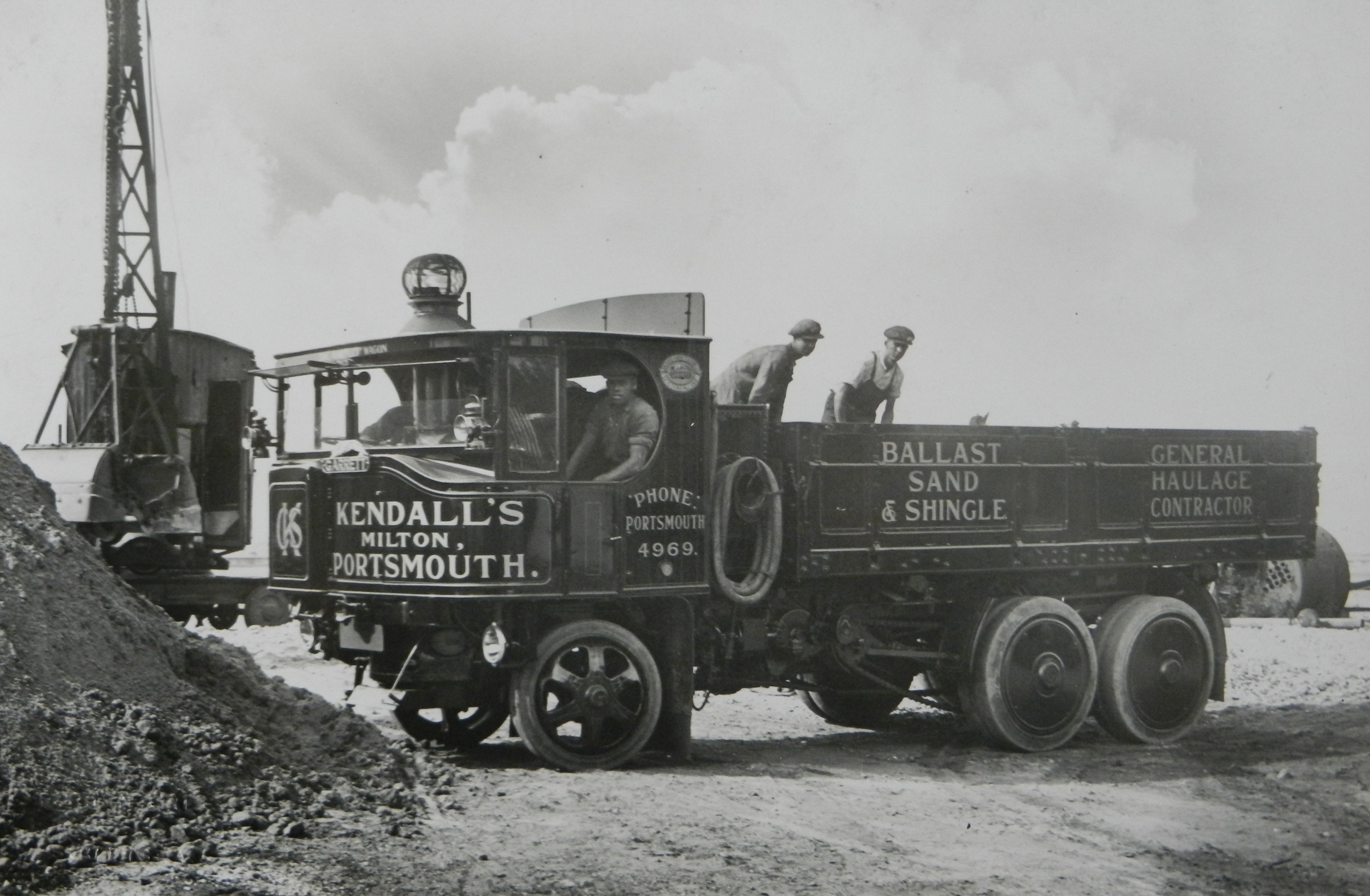
Garrett Six wheeled tipping steam wagon of 1931

In the immediate post war era, several manufacturers who had previously been producing overtypes switched their focus to undertypes, attempting to compete with Sentinel. Among these companies were Claytons and Garrett. In 1922 Foden began producing the celebrated C-type overtype. It was not a revolutionary wagon, but had improvements such as a better driving position and the option of a windscreen. In 1923, Sentinel launched a much updated wagon, the "Super" Sentinel. In 1924, Fowler made their attempt to enter the undertype market. The various undertypes of the era were frequently fitted with windscreens to improve crew comfort.

In the early 1920s, in an attempt to circumvent the weight regulations of the period and allow a higher capacity, several companies had experimented with the idea of an articulated trailer. With the brake and tyre technology of the era, such designs were often found to be difficult to control, with a propensity for jackknifing. In 1926, Garrett produced a prototype rigid six wheeled wagon, which anticipated a change in regulation that came in August 1927 increasing the maximum allowable gross weight from 12 tons to 19 tons with no axle weight exceeding 7 1/2 tons. Both Sentinel and Foden quickly brought out six wheelers, and these became a large percentage of the output of these manufacturers for the remainder of steam wagon production.

Around this period, Foden made several attempts to build undertypes, with the E-type being largely a failure. Yorkshire produced the updated "WG", "WH" (shaft drive) and "WJ" (six wheeler) wagons

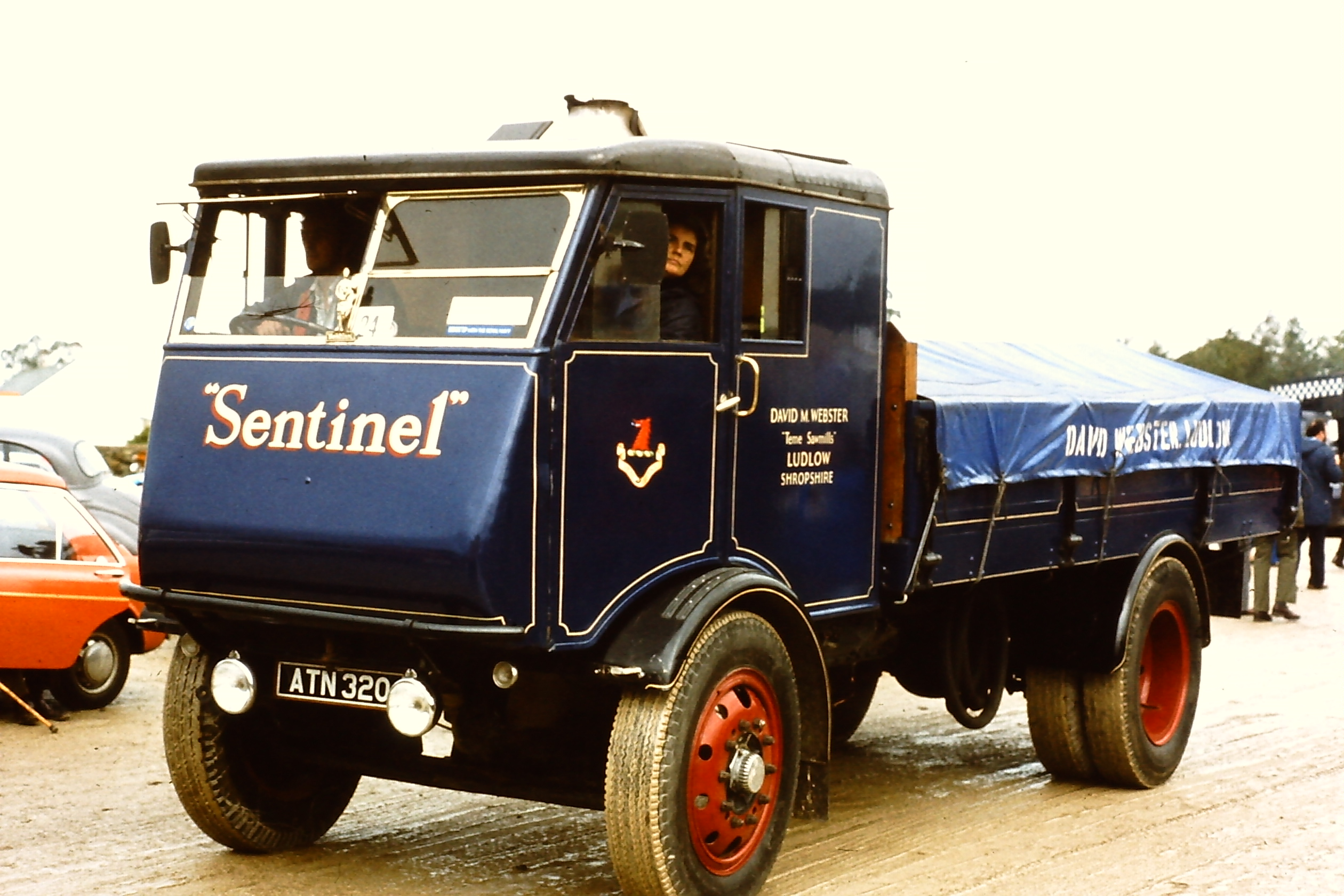
"Sentinel" S4 8942 of 1934

=== The last stand ===
By the beginning of the 1930s, the landscape was becoming difficult for steam wagon production. Many manufacturers had gone out of business, and many others had turned to internal combustion. The only major manufacturers who produced new designs in this period were Foden and Sentinel. In 1930, Foden launched their revolutionary "O-Type", better known as the "Speed-Six" and "Speed-Twelve" wagons. They were a valiant attempt at producing a modern steam wagon, but suffered from reliability problems, primarily due to issues with the boiler design. At the end of 1932, Foden turned to diesel wagons. The last French producer was Valentin Purrey who ceased production in 1929.

The only remaining player in the market was Sentinel. In 1933, they launched their "S" type wagons. A fast, well thought out and reliable design, it was a valiant attempt to maintain the steam wagon market. Despite this, in 1938, production ceased, except for 100 wagons produced in the early 1950s for the Argentine government, and a solitary wagon produced for the home market.

Pat Kennett in his book The Foden Story says of the final years of steam wagon development: "The sight of a steam wagon travelling at speeds in the 40-50 mph bracket or higher was particularly impressive, perhaps because one tended to associate this kind of machine with a more sedate pace altogether. Nevertheless anyone who has seen a Sentinel or a Foden undertype with a full load, bowling along in complete silence at that kind of speed is never likely to forget it and, to many steam men, those brief years at the end of the '20s and the beginning of the '30s represented the pinnacle of achievement in the steam wagon industry".

=== Commercial use ===
While steam wagon use greatly diminished in the 1930s due to the effects of the Salter Report, many wagons were converted to pneumatic tyres and saw later use. Another use, where wagons often retained solid tyres, was as tar sprayers. Steam wagons also saw use by local authorities into the 1950s. Standard Sentinel waggons were still in commercial use internally at Brown Bayley Steels during the 1960s. A few of the tar sprayers remained in use into the 1980s.

=== Disappearance ===
Road steam disappeared through becoming uneconomical to operate, and unpopular with British governments. By 1921, steam tractors had demonstrated clear economic advantages over horse power for heavy hauling and short journeys. However, petrol lorries were starting to show better efficiency and could be purchased cheaply as war surplus; on a busy route a 3-ton petrol lorry cost £100 less to operate than its steam equivalent, in spite of restrictive speed limits, and relatively high fuel prices and maintenance costs.

Throughout the 1920s and 1930s successive governments placed tighter restrictions on road steam haulage, including smoke and vapour limits.

As a result of the Salter Report on road funding, an 'axle weight tax' was introduced in 1933 in order to charge commercial motor vehicles more for the costs of maintaining the road system, and to do away with the perception that the free use of roads was subsidising the competitors of rail freight. The tax was payable by all road hauliers in proportion to the axle load; it was particularly damaging to steam propulsion, which was heavier than its petrol equivalent.

Initially, imported oil was taxed much more than British-produced coal, but in 1934 Oliver Stanley, the Minister for Transport, reduced taxes on fuel oils while raising the Road Fund charge on road locomotives to £100 a year, provoking protests by engine manufacturers, hauliers, showmen and the coal industry. This was at a time of high unemployment in the mining industry, when the steam haulage business represented a market of 950,000 tons of coal annually. The tax was devastating to the businesses of heavy hauliers and showmen, and precipitated the scrapping of many engines.

== Steam wagon manufacturers ==
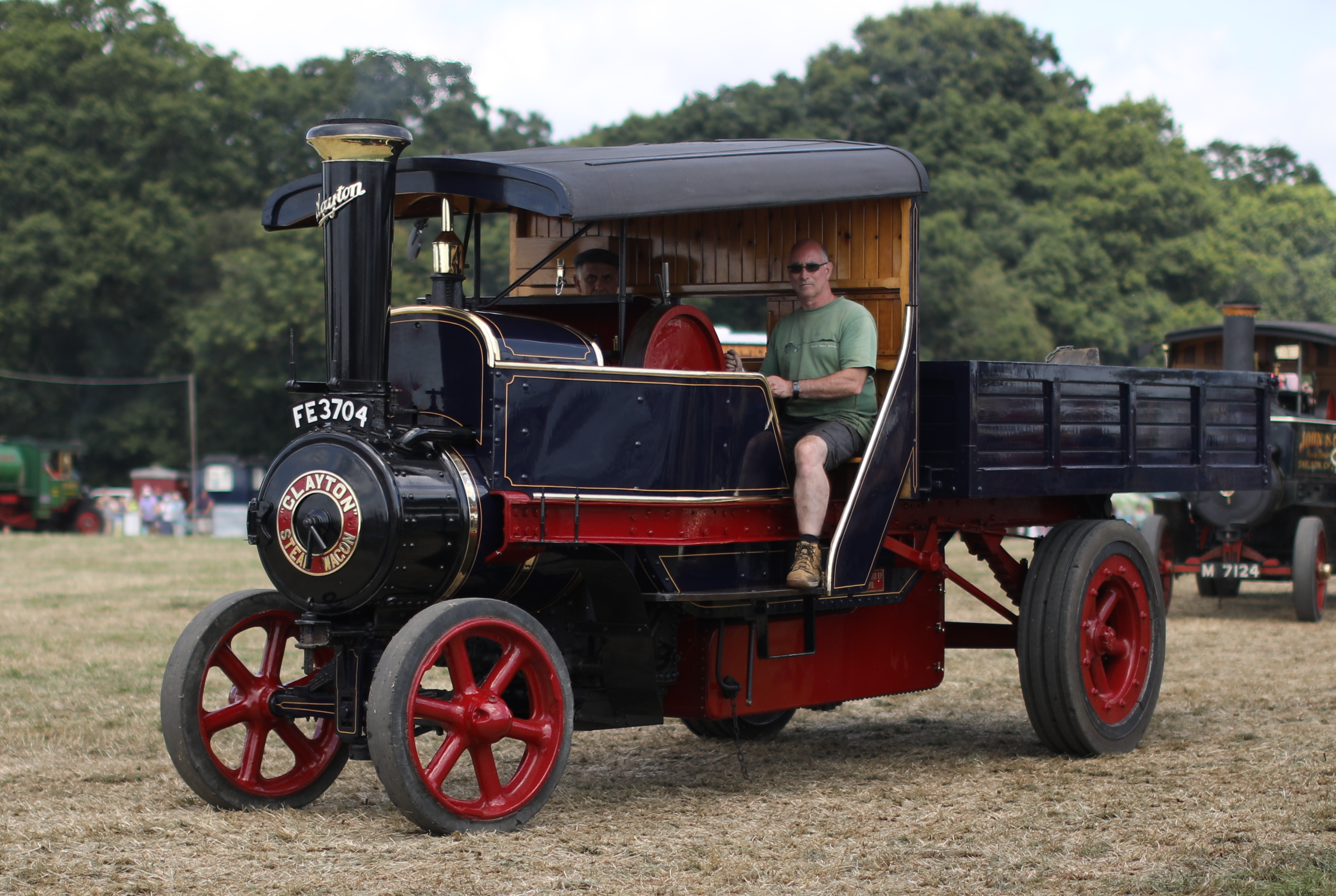
A Clayton and Shuttleworth steam wagon dating from 1920

There were almost 160 manufacturers of steam wagons.

Many traction engine builders also built forms of steam lorry, but some firms specialised in them.

John I. Thornycroft & Company was an established marine engineering company that successfully spawned the Steam Carriage and Wagon Company for the production of steam-powered road vehicles. They supplied steam lorries to the British Army, commercial steam wagons and vans, steam cars (for a few years), and buses – London's first powered bus was a Thornycroft double-decker steam bus.

Manufacturers who were significant producers of steam lorries include:

- Aveling & Porter Ltd., Rochester, Kent
- Bristol Wagon & Carriage Works Ltd., Lawrence Hill, Bristol - Built steam wagons from 1904 to 1908.
- Charles Burrell & Sons Ltd., St Nicholas Works, Thetford
- Clayton Wagons Ltd., Lincoln
- Fodens Ltd., Elworth Works, Sandbach, Cheshire
- Leyland Steam Motor Co., Leyland, Lancashire - Founded in 1896–1907, then became Leyland Motors Ltd (steam wagons built until 1926).
- Mann's Patent Steam Cart and Wagon Company, Hunslet, Leeds
- Richard Garrett & Sons, Leiston, Suffolk
- Robey & Co., Globe Works, Lincoln
- Sentinel Waggon Works Ltd., Shrewsbury, Shropshire
- Sheppee Motor & Engineering Co. Ltd., Thomas St., York - Briefly built steam cars.
- Straker Steam Vehicle Company Ltd., Bristol
- The Thornycroft Steam Carriage and Wagon Company (later Thornycroft), Basingstoke
- Wallis & Steevens, Hampshire Iron Works, Basingstoke, Hants.
- Yorkshire Patent Steam Wagon Co., Hunslet, Leeds

Outside UK:

- Hanomag (Germany)
- Henschel (Germany)

== In popular culture ==
The 1928 film The Wrecker features a spectacular crash between a passenger train and a Foden steam lorry stuck on a level crossing. The scene was filmed at Herriard on the Basingstoke and Alton Light Railway, in one take, and destroyed both the steam wagon and the SECR F1 class locomotive.

== See also ==
- History of steam road vehicles
- Steam bus
- Steam car
- Traction engine
- Showman's road locomotive
