= Transverse boiler =

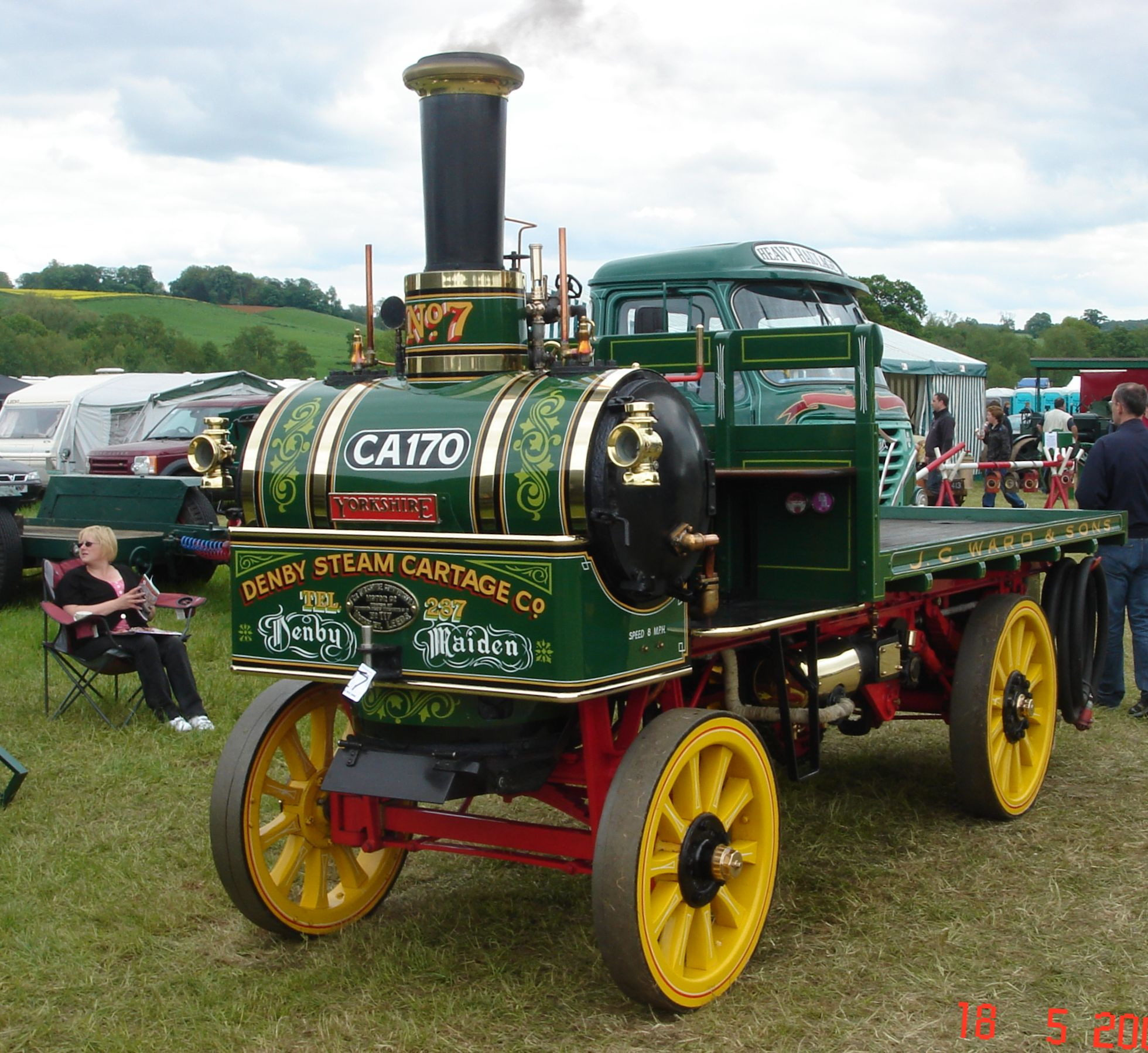
1905 Yorkshire Patent Steam Wagon, originally from the Tom Varley collection

A transverse boiler is a boiler used to generate steam to power a vehicle. Unlike other boilers, its external drum is mounted transversely across the vehicle.

The obvious advantage of the transverse boiler is that it is short lengthways, compared to a locomotive boiler. Where space is short, such as with railmotors, this can give more usable space inside. A less obvious, but more significant advantage for road vehicles, is that the water level of the boiler is less sensitive to the road gradient. When descending steep hills, there is less risk of the firebox crown being exposed above the water level and dangerously overheating.

Transverse boilers are broadly similar to locomotive boilers in construction. They have an internal firebox with multiple small fire-tubes.

== Yorkshire Patent steam wagons ==
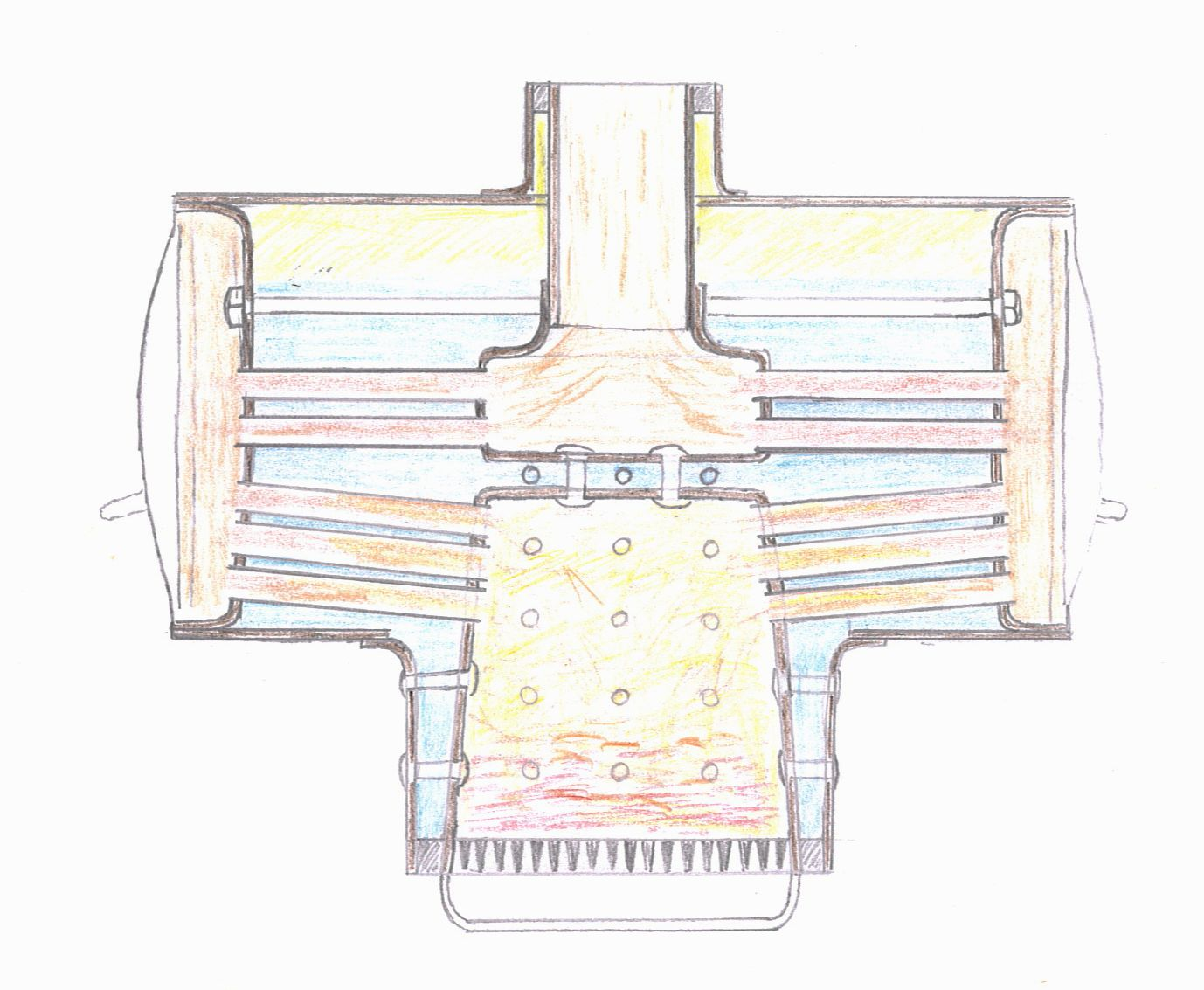
Yorkshire Patent Steam Wagon Co.

The best known transverse boiler was that used by the Yorkshire Patent Steam Wagon Co. for its distinctive steam wagons. This boiler, the company's eponymous patent, was unique in being both transverse and double-ended. This patent was applied for in 1900 and the boiler continued in production until 1937. It was designed to provide a compact boiler with ample heating surface and pre-dated other effective designs of vertical boiler, such as the Sentinel.

The boiler consists of one long horizontal transverse drum, with a central locomotive-style firebox mounted in an extension beneath. The first boilers had a square firebox, but this was later changed to a circular section. Firing with coke is carried out through a firedoor in the side of the shell, to the rear of the boiler when installed. Fire-tubes lead to a shallow smokebox at each side, from which return tubes pass to a central chamber beneath the chimney. The chimney is wrapped with an extension of the boiler shell, acting as a steam collecting dome. There are 32 tubes in total from the firebox, of 1¾ inch diameter, and 28 more to the chimney chamber. Longitudinal stays support the flat tubeplates at each side. An unusual feature is that rather than the usual single blastpipe beneath the chimney, there are 14 of them on each side inside each smokebox, pointing into the return tubes. Exhaust steam from the engine reaches these blastpipes through a prominent copper pipe on the outside of each smokebox door.

The working pressure was 200 lb. sq. in., comparable to the more advanced locomotives of the period.

An advantageous feature of the boiler was that the fire-tubes were entirely submerged. Competing vertical boilers of the period had semi-submerged tubes with their upper ends in the steam space above the water level, leading to erosion and rapid tube wear around the level.

== Railmotors ==
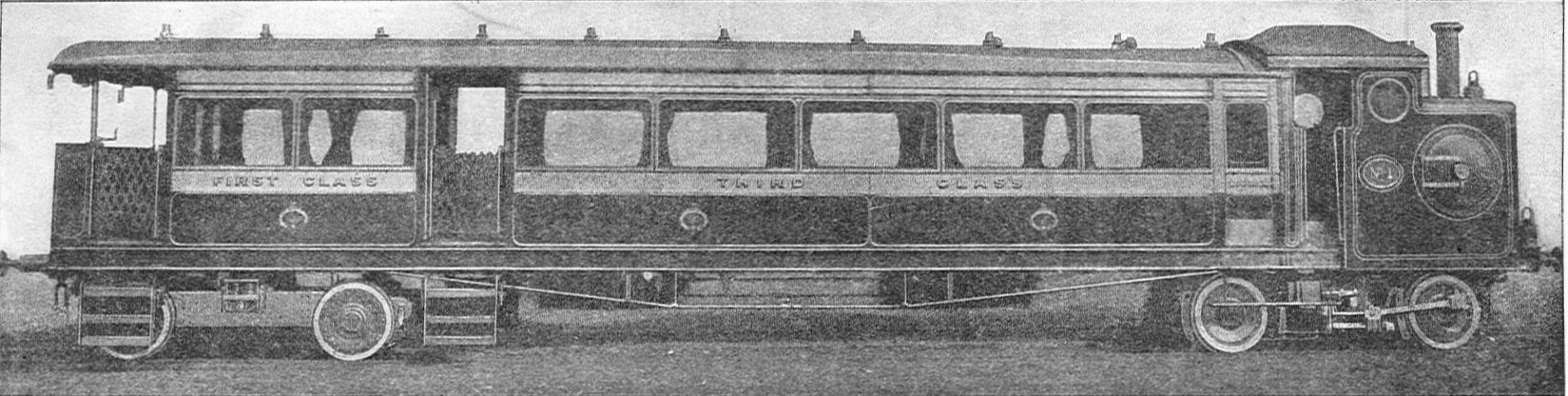
Taff Vale Railway steam railmotor

Some rare steam railmotors used transverse boilers, instead of the more common vertical boilers, or short locomotive boilers. These were chosen to provide a compact boiler, but with easier servicing than for a vertical boiler.
