= Sheppee =

The Sheppee was an English steam automobile manufactured in York by the Sheppee Motor Company run by Colonel Francis Henry Sheppee, son of Lieutenant-Colonel Francis Faulkener Sheppee (1835–1913). After long service with the army in India, Colonel F.H. Sheppee created the Sheppee Motor Company in Thomas Street, York around 1902. The firm mainly made steam-driven commercial vehicles but in 1912 at least two passenger cars were made with 25 hp engines and flash boilers. In 1913, they announced they had got a site on the Birmingham Road near Worcester where they would build a new factory for production of their 3-ton steam wagons.

After WW1, the company moved away from commercial vehicles into production of a motor add-on for bicycles, plus they were involved in innovations in washing machines and conveyor belt systems, and then into automation in the glassware industry. In all these areas they protected their innovative designs with numerous patents, and these reveal a name change for the company circa 1939 to Sheppee Motor and Engineering Co Ltd.

== Sheppee Steam Wagons ==
Unlike most steam wagons, the Sheppee wagon used a boiler developed along the lines of the Serpollet steam car. This type of boiler is known as a flash boiler, in which water is boiled within tubes and not within a large pressure vessel. This allows far faster start-up and can produce very high pressure, high-temperature superheated steam (up to 450 Celsius), the handling of which places demands upon the boiler tubes and also the materials, engineering, and lubrication of the engine. In 1908 an article in Commercial Motor detailed the boiler and engine design for their 2-ton chassis, and both single acting and double acting engines had been designed, the latter developing 50 bhp. Although flash boilers have many advantages, they need a control system for both the water feed into the boiler and the heat input - in this case by paraffin fuelled burners. If the boiler tubes overheat then they can fail due to the high pressures within, though unlike a conventional boiler this doesn't lead to a steam explosion, as the amount of contained water is small. Two vehicles supplied to Natal in 1910 were described in Commercial Motor magazine, where it was claimed that a burst tube could be replaced in 30 minutes. These wagons had twin cylinder double acting engines driving a countershaft via spur gears, which together with the differential were contained within the crankcase. The engine was in the middle of the chassis, and the boiler under the bonnet at the front. There were no change speed gears, but there were controls for reversing and varying the steam cut-off, though the mechanism for doing this is not explained.

During the development of their boiler, control system, and steam engines a considerable number of patents were filed. The early patents from 1904 were co-authored by John Henry Sheppee with John Edward Gibbs (GB190414240, GB190427735, GB190427736, GB190427737, GB190427738, GB190515105, GB190612308, GB190614870, GB190614872), with others named on patents being Francis Faulkner Sheppee (his father) (GB190606570), Edward Cyril Bowden-Smith (GB190613384, FR378514, GB190711171, GB190720179), Maurice Walker Shippey (GB190809492, GB191013098), Edgell William Sheppee (his brother)(GB191303237, GB191303236) and Samuel George Jowitt (from GB191423737 through to 1939, though these related to other developments). Another patent without co-authors (GB190810851) reveals that the use of the high pressure, high temperature steam required the steam engine to use poppet valves (as used in internal combustion engines) - there were also problems with cylinder castings cracking due to thermal expansion stresses which were overcome by using cylinders that were tubular sandwiched between cylinder head castings, with the valves operating in the head/s.

In 1913, they announced they had developed the design to a point where they would go into larger-scale production in a new factory in Worcester. One of their 3-ton steam wagons had now done 20,000 miles without any recent troubles, and they were now confident they had overcome the technical challenges of using highly superheated steam.

In August 1913, it was announced that the price for the Sheppee 3-ton steam wagon was £610 for the standard model, and £630 for the colonial model. With net 3 tons load it was claimed on give-and-take roads in Yorkshire the fuel consumption was 0.25 gallons of paraffin per mile. Further details of the 3-ton Sheppee steam wagon revealed that the production vehicle used a twin-cylinder double acting engine with "mushroom" valves. The boiler was paraffin fuelled with a secondary pressurised tank, so that the main tank could be refilled without stopping the engine. There was an encased chain drive from the crankshaft to the countershaft, and the countershaft contained the differential, with chain drive to the back wheels. Brakes were provided on the countershaft, and there were also internal expanding drum brakes on the rear wheels.

In the 1980s castings to make a model stationary steam engine were produced by Chelston Model Engineering based on an engine by Samuel G. Jowitt, which was in appearance a single cylinder stationary engine using poppet valves. As Samuel G. Jowitt worked for Sheppee, and use of poppet valves in steam engines is unusual, the engine design may originally be tied in to development work at Sheppee.

== Sheppee Cykelaid ==
In 1919 Sheppee patented "Improvements in Motor Wheel attachments for cycles and the like" (GB141866) and then in 1920 they launched the Cykelaid, a motorised petrol-driven bicycle attachment replacing the entire front fork and wheel assembly with a powered unit. The Cykelaid made its debut on Stand No 49 at the Cycle & Motorcycle Show, Olympia, in 1920. The original engine was 51mm bore by 51mm stroke (104 cc), but at the 1922 show the revised model had a bore of 55mm and a stroke of 56mm giving 133 cc. Sheppee also sold complete bicycles (for ladies and gents), tricycles, invalid-tricycles and Chater-Lea tandems fitted with the Cykelaid. The production of the frames for the complete machines was probably contracted out, and from an account in November 1922, we know the frames for the Cykelaid exhibits for the 1922 Olympia show were made by Robert Parker's of Spencer Street, Hull.

The following is taken from Grace's Guide:

- 1921

In production the complete power unit was carried on a special front fork, with the 104 cc two-stroke engine on the left with its main-shaft run through the wheel spindle to a flywheel. Ignition was by chain-driven Runbaken magneto bolted upside-down to the crankcase base, and transmission was by chain up to a counter-shaft carrying a clutch and then back to the wheel by a second chain. The firm offered a package of wheel, engine unit and front fork or the choice of complete ladies' or gents' machines. The complete Cykelaid could be purchased for £50. The specification included an Eadie coaster brake, rear hand-operated brake, number plate, rear stand and Brooks saddle. The wheels were 28″×1.75″, shod with Dunlop Roadster tyres. Alternatively, the complete front fork assembly was available for £32, as a conversion of an existing bicycle. The early versions were not fitted with a front brake and, as mentioned above, the complete machine was fitted with two independent rear brakes. Presumably, when buying the front fork unit to convert an existing bicycle, one was also expected to fit an additional rear brake to the machine. Although the engine was lubricated by the petroil mixture, an additional oil tank was fitted. An oil pump driven by the front wheel hub delivered a measured supply of oil to the engine's main bearings. It would, therefore, be inadvisable to allow the engine to run for a long period with the clutch disengaged, since this would cut off the supply of oil to the crankshaft. None of the available options proved to be very popular with the buying public.

1922

Late that year modifications were made and the machine appeared as the New Cykelaid with simplified ignition and a pump system in place of petroil lubrication. Capacity was increased to 133cc and girder forks were added. The wheel size was reduced to 26″×2″. Protection for the rider was improved by fitting deep valences to the mudguard and by lengthening the exhaust pipe. A front brake was now fitted. The 133 cc two-stroke engine fitted to the left of the front wheel, chain drive via a counter-shaft and a flywheel magneto on the right that was driven by the main-shaft running through the wheel spindle. Although the performance was quite adequate, it had become outdated.

1925

A dummy-rim rear brake was adopted.

1926

The last year of production.

Note: The engine unit increased the weight of a cycle by 35 lb. It was claimed that it would propel a bicycle at speeds from 3 mph to 20 mph and that a 100-mile journey could be completed on a full tank of fuel.

== Sheppee Motor and Engineering ==
The Sheppee Motor and Engineering Co Ltd was created in 1932, with F.H. Sheppee as permanent governing director. It began to manufacture various products, including washing machines and conveyor belts - both areas in which it held patents. One example of a washing machine still exists today in the museum in York. Sheppee Engineering was a leading force in the area, providing bespoke solutions to the local industry.

It was in 1938 when Sheppee Engineering took a new direction that would remain with the company to this present day. The company was requested to find a solution for a local bottle maker, National Glass in York, to automate the handling process of newly formed bottles and with that, Sheppee Engineering developed the glass bottle industries first automated glassware handling equipment.

== Sheppee International ==
Glassware handling proved to be the success story that Colonel Francis Sheppee had been searching for, and this catapulted the business forwards. The company grew and soon had to expand its premises and acquired adjacent land on James Street in York, where the company operated until in 1993, when Sheppee Engineering Ltd. hit financial difficulty and fell into liquidation. The management team bought the company under the new name Sheppee International Ltd.

Today operating from Elvington in York, Sheppee International is a supplier of ware handling equipment for the glass container industry.

== See also ==
- List of car manufacturers of the United Kingdom
