= Yorkshire Patent Steam Wagon Co. =

British steam wagon manufacturer

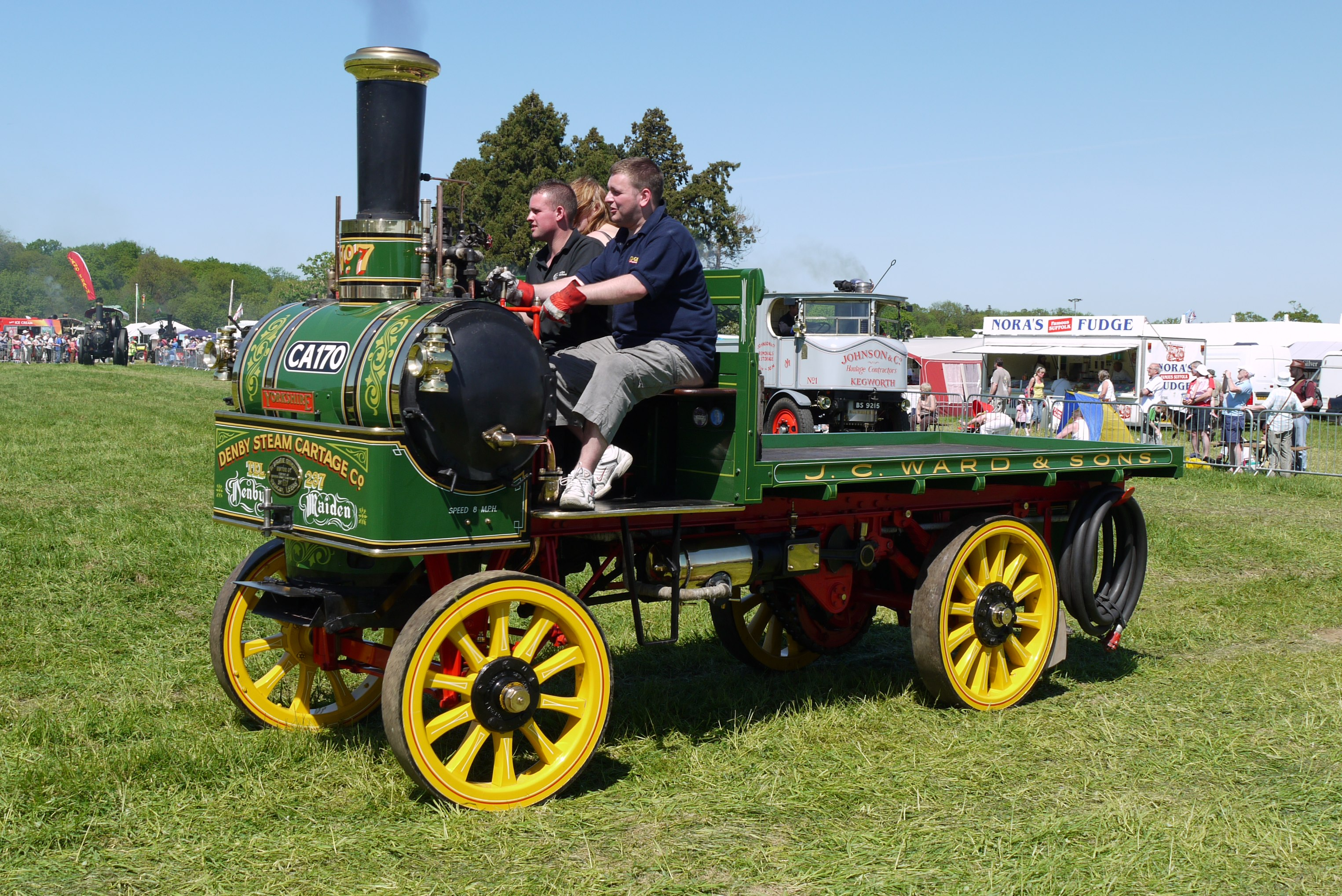
Denby Maiden

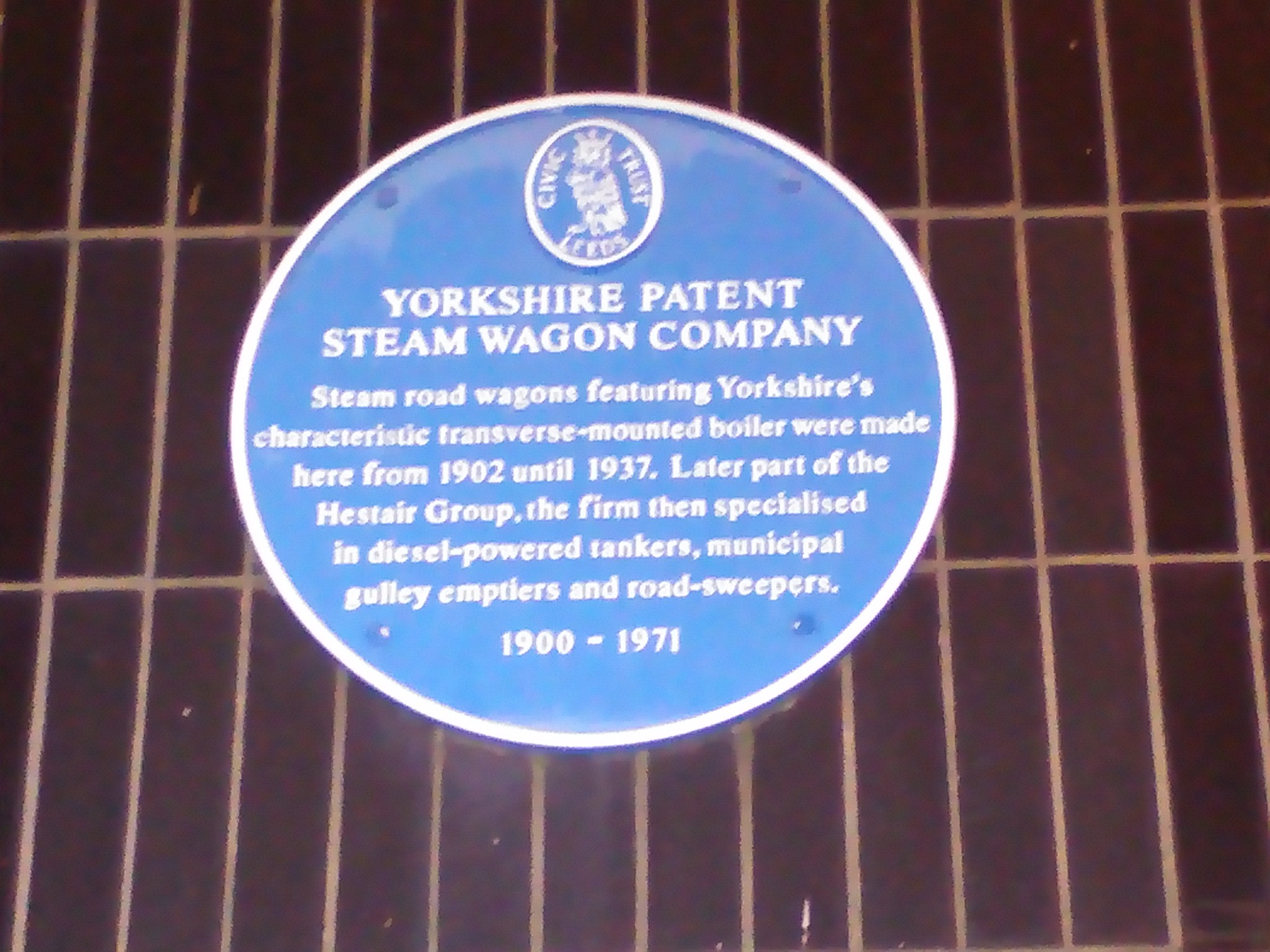
Yorkshire Patent Steam Plaque

The Yorkshire Patent Steam Wagon Co. was a steam wagon manufacturer in Leeds, England. The factory was on Pepper Road. They produced their first wagon in 1901. Their designs had a novel double-ended transverse boiler. In 1911 the company's name was changed to Yorkshire Commercial Motor Co., but reverted to Yorkshire Patent Steam Wagon Co. in 1922. Steam wagon production ceased in 1937, and the company was finally dissolved in 1993.

Other local steam vehicle manufacturers were John Fowler & Co., J&H McLaren & Co., and the Mann's Patent Steam Cart and Wagon Company, along with several steam railway engine builders.

Technical data for the 5/6 ton, 4 ton, and 3.5 ton trucks can be found in the book Commercial Vehicles of Great Britain Volume 2 from 1920 on page 79.

== Double-ended boiler ==
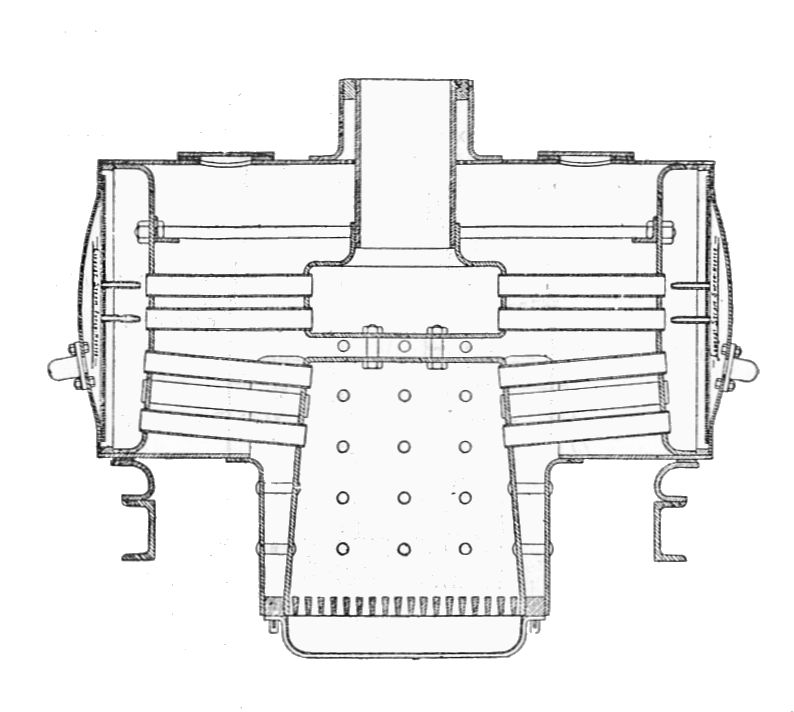
Yorkshire steam wagon double-ended boiler

The novel double-ended transverse-mounted boiler was used to avoid problems of tilting when climbing hills. Internally it resembled a locomotive or Fairlie boiler with a central firebox and multiple fire-tubes to each end. In the Yorkshire though, a second bank of fire-tubes above returned to a central smokebox and a single chimney.

== Preserved machines ==
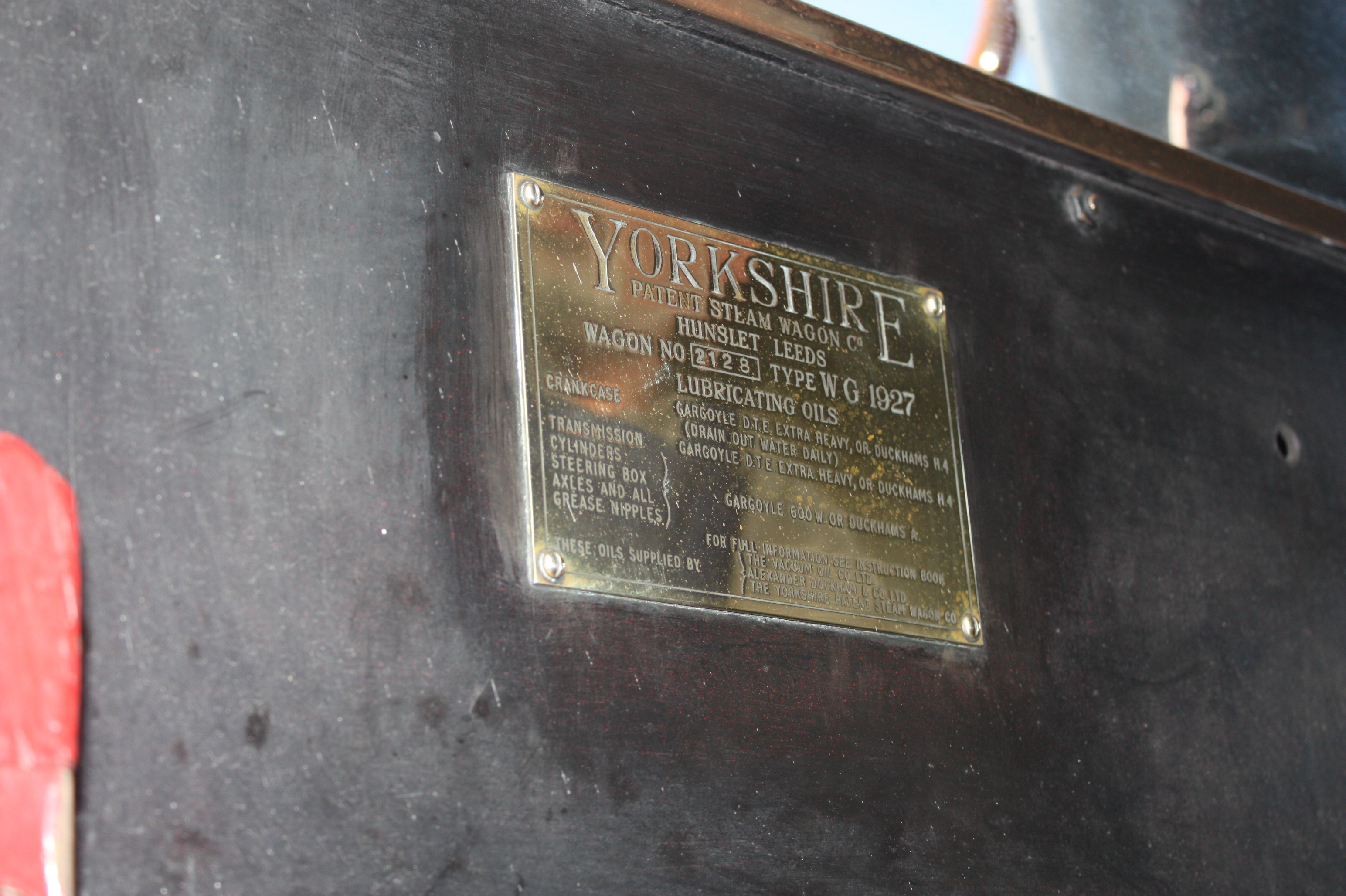
The manufacturer's plate on a preserved steam wagon

There are 15 preserved machines recorded.

Eight of these wagons are located in the United Kingdom; three of these were restored by Tom Varley.

There are five surviving wagons in Australia, including the oldest known surviving Yorkshire in the world, No. 34 at Booleroo Steam & Traction Preservation Society Inc; Yorkshire Steam Waggon. Imported by T Russel of Geelong Vic and used by Smith & Timms in Adelaide SA before going to Whyalla SA for use in the construction of the town's first dam. It finished its working life in 1918.

Also operational in Australia is 1443, in regular use at Milawa, near Melbourne, Victoria. It is fitted with a lightweight open-air body.

One wagon, 1534, survives in Colombia, and another, 1535 survives in New Zealand.

== See also ==
- L&YR railmotors, Kerr Stuart steam railmotors with a similar boiler design
- South African Dutton road-rail tractors, rail tractors converted from Yorkshire wagons.
