= Foden Trucks =

Automobile manufacturer

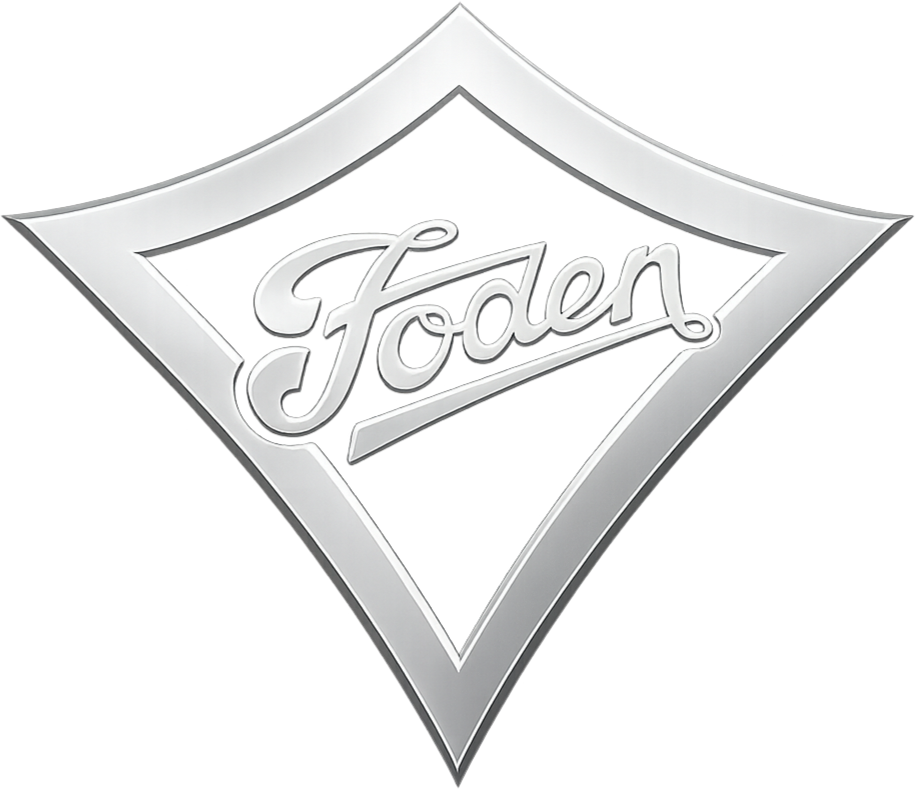
- Industry: Automotive
- Founded: 1887
- Founder: Edwin Foden
- Defunct: July 2006
- Successor: Leyland Trucks
- Headquarters: Sandbach, England
- Products: Trucks
- Parent: Paccar
- Website: www.foden.com

Foden Trucks was a British truck and bus manufacturing company which had its origins in Elworth near Sandbach in 1856. Paccar acquired the company in 1980 and ceased to use the marque name in 2006.

== History ==
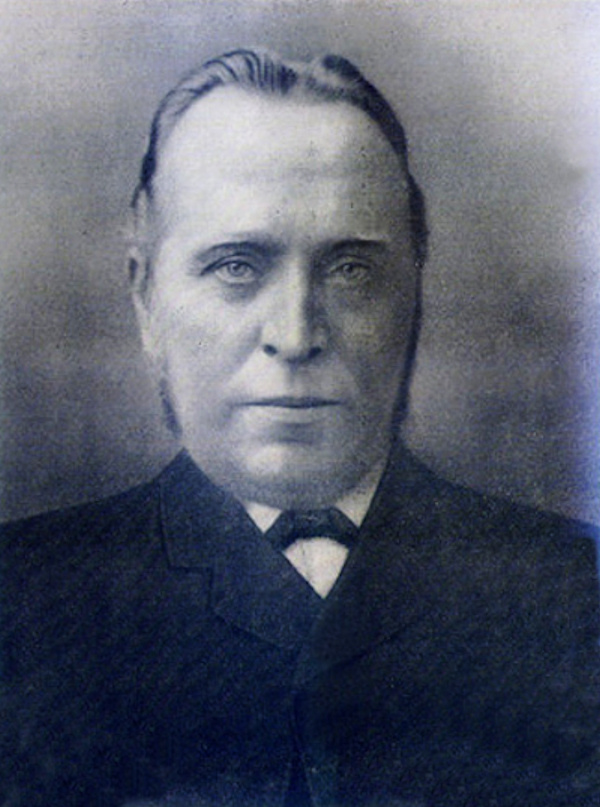
Edwin Foden (1841-1911)

=== Steam ===
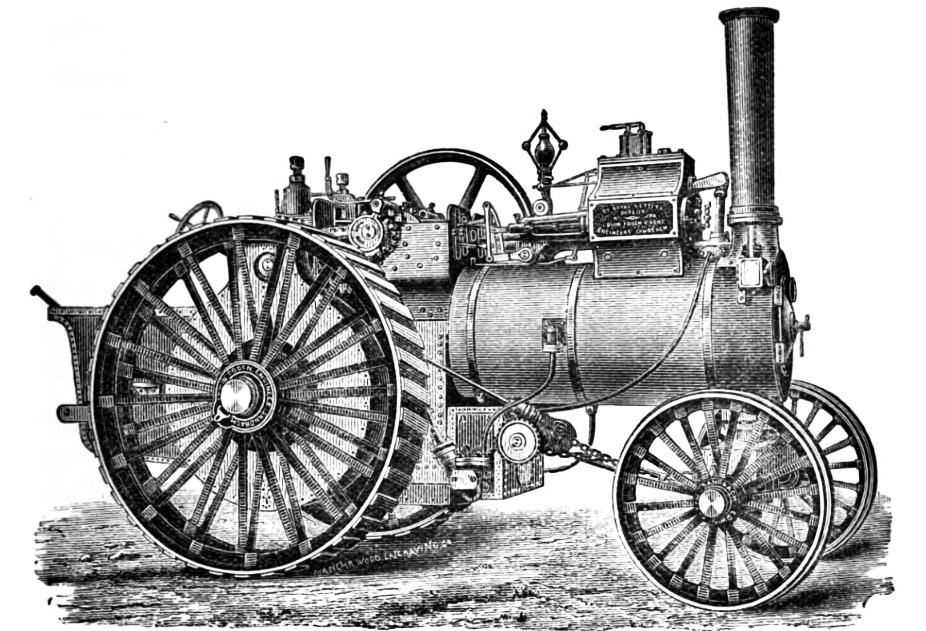
Foden steam tractor (1890)

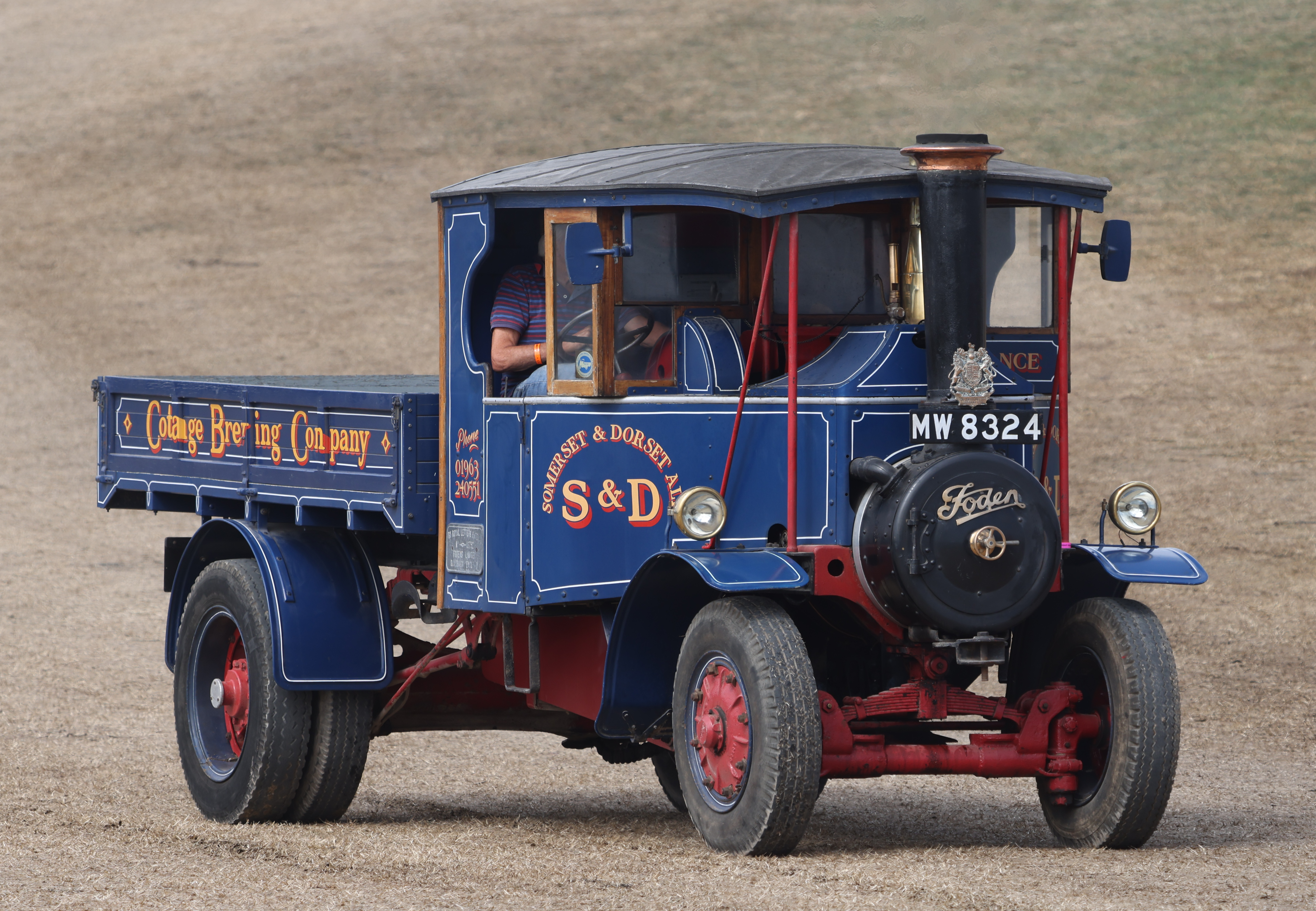
A 1930 Foden steam wagon

In 1856, Edwin Foden became an apprentice at the agricultural equipment manufacturing company of Plant & Hancock. He left the company for an apprenticeship at Crewe Railway Works, but returned to Plant & Hancock at the age of 19. A few years afterwards, he became a partner in the company which was renamed to Hancock & Foden. in 1876, the company was renamed Edwin Foden Sons & Co. Ltd. The company produced massive industrial engines, small stationary steam engines, and from 1880, agricultural traction engines.

In 1878, the legislation affecting agricultural use was eased, and as a result, Foden produced a successful range of agricultural traction engines. The perfecting of the compound traction engine in 1887 gave a significant marketing advantage and later proved invaluable to the development of the steam lorry. Foden also produced 11 Showman's road locomotives. Production of traction engines largely stopped with World War One but at least one was produced as late as 1920.

In 1896, the restrictions affecting road transport were eased, which permitted vehicles under 3 tons to travel at up to 12 mph (19 km/h) without a red flag. The time was right, and Foden produced a series of four prototype wagons. The experience gained from this enabled Foden to build a 3-ton wagon for the War Office 1901 self-propelled lorry trial.

The Foden was consistently faster and more economical over the arduous road trials than the Thorneycroft entry, but was placed second overall as it was claimed that the Thornycroft entry had better off-road performance. Foden's wagon was nevertheless regarded by most commentators as a clear winner (the result was questioned in Parliament by Crewe's MP). This model was the basis for a highly successful line of vehicles that were produced over the next 30 years. The great majority of Foden steam lorries were overtype, but undertypes were also produced starting in the late 1920. these Included the unsuccessful E-type and the O-type "Speed-6" and "Speed-12", which was a much more modern vehicle.

Foden supplied its final steam wagon in 1934.

=== Diesel ===
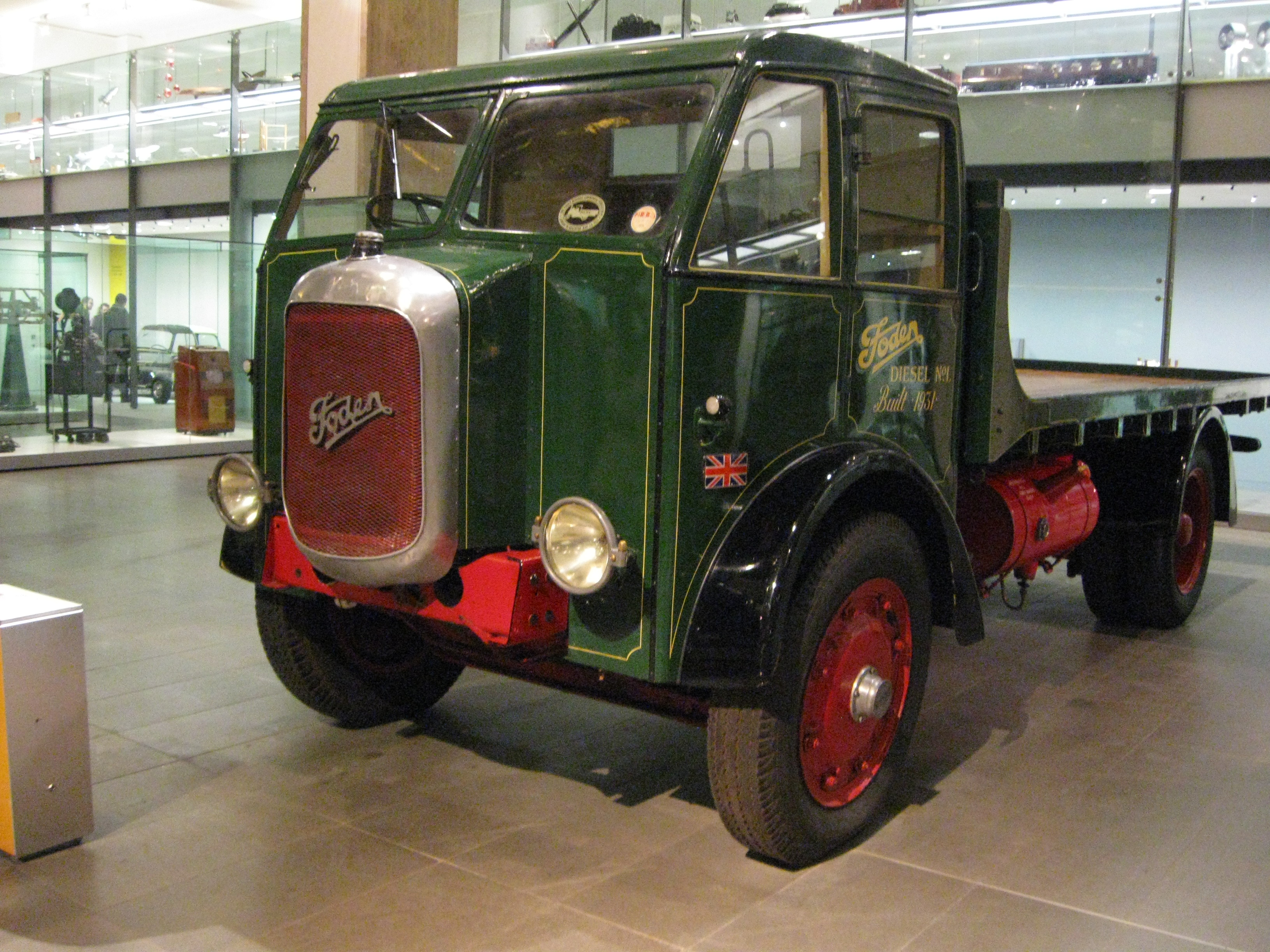
Foden F1 1931 diesel, on display at the Science Museum, London

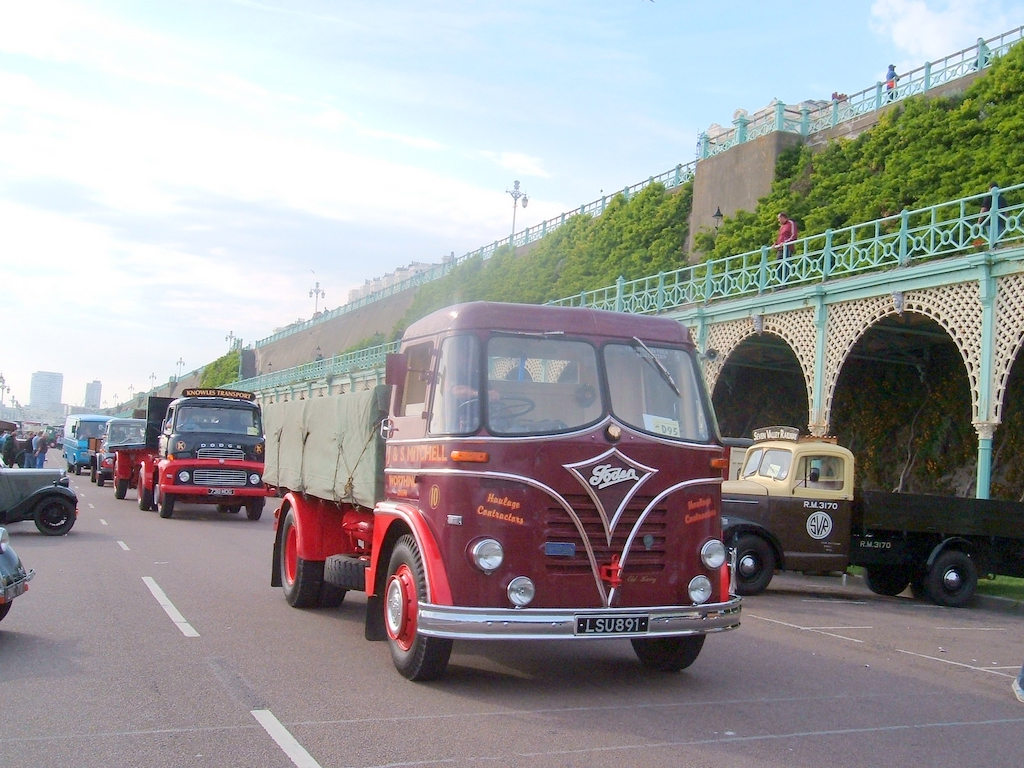
A 1959 Foden S20 dropside

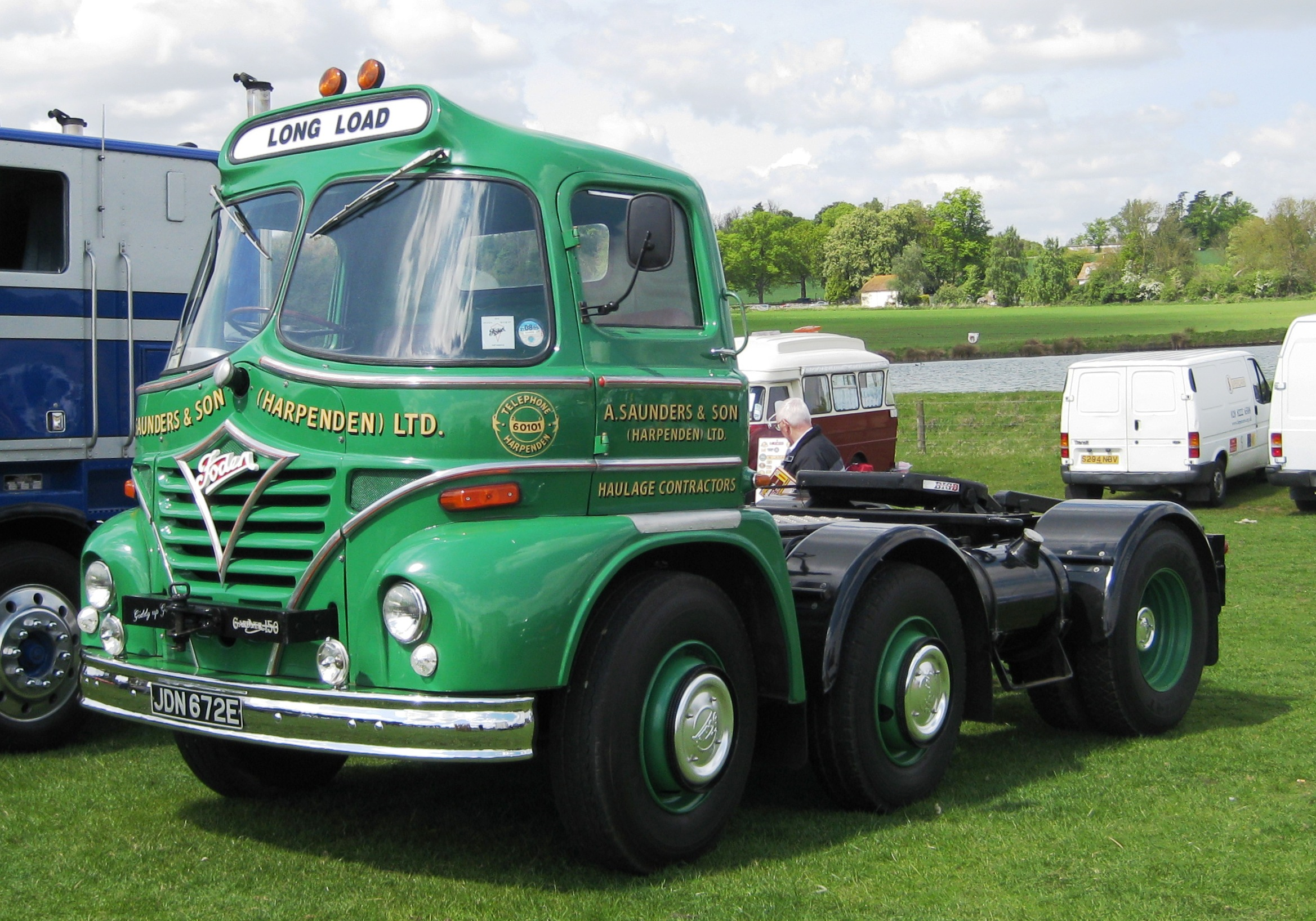
Foden S21 tractor unit – DAX6/32 6x2 Twin Steer Tractive Unit, JDN 672E

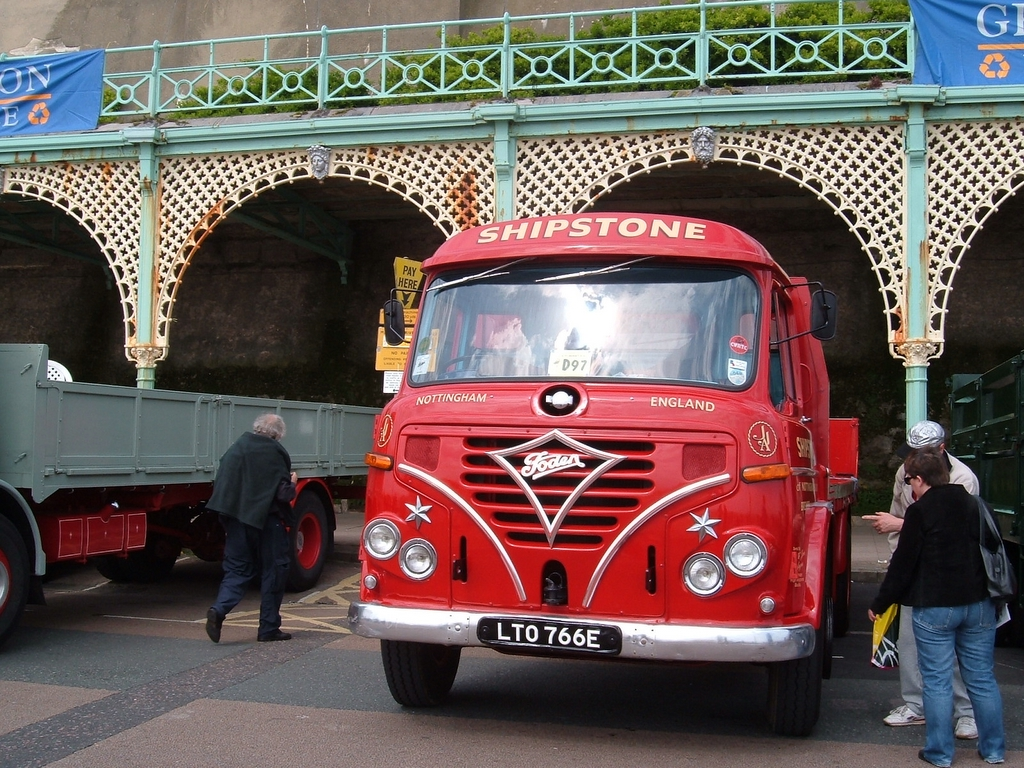
A 1967 Foden S36 flatbed

By 1930, Edwin's son, Edwin Richard Foden (known as E.R.) could see the future lay in diesel power. In late 1932, he resigned from the board of directors, following several years of bitter wranglings, and subsequently retired; he was 62 and ready for retirement, having spent his entire working life at Foden's. His son Dennis could not afford to resign. He was not prepared to let things ride so, with financial input from across the immediate family, a new company was set up to design and produce diesel lorries. George Faulkener, related to Dennis by marriage, became works manager and Ernest Sherratt, both ex-Foden employees, helped to design a new diesel wagon. Edwin Richard Foden was persuaded to come out of retirement and head the new company, which became known as ERF.

In the early 1930s, however, Foden realised that the future was diesel, and changed their production almost immediately, though the production of steam vehicles continued in diminishing numbers until 1934. Their first diesel vehicle was the Foden F1 introduced in 1931 and regarded as the "first commercially successful type of diesel lorry".

Postwar initially had the reintroduction of the old models with few improvements, although Foden entered the bus chassis market in 1946 (a number of prototypes, including a double-decker had been built in the 1930s); by 1950, they had developed a rear-engined model, antedating the Leyland Atlantean by seven years. Although the Foden PVR was a high-framed single decker, the cruciform chassis bracing used by Foden made an underfloor engine location, as in the competitive AEC Regal IV, Leyland Royal Tiger, or Daimler Freeline, not possible.

In 1948, the completely new FE and FG lorry ranges were introduced, along with the new Foden FD6 two-stroke diesel engine, which became the standard engine for certain Foden heavy lorry models, such as the S18 FE6/15 Rigid Eight-Wheeler – the optional Gardner 6LW-engined version was the S18 FG6/15. (The S18 designation refers to the new cab that was produced for the new range.) The FD6 two-stroke engine, along with Gardner engines, was also fitted in Foden motorcoaches and buses. Only one Foden PVD double decker had the Foden engine, but it was popular in the PVS and PVR single-deckers, especially in coaching applications because it was much higher revving than the Gardner 5LW or 6LW. Bus and coach production ceased in 1956, but the last chassis only left the works in 1959, when it was registered 367CKA and received an early Plaxton Panorama body.

In 1958 lightweight glass-reinforced plastic (GRP) used in cab production was introduced, and this led to the manufacture of the first British-built, mass-produced tilting cab in 1962. The first Foden GRP cab was the distinctively styled S21 model. The S21 was initially nicknamed both "Spaceship" and "Sputnik" by the commercial vehicle press, but was more popular by the "Mickey Mouse" nickname. The more traditional metal-and-wood S20 cab, introduced in 1956, was still fitted to many Foden lorries until at least 1963, after which it was just fitted to special vehicles until 1968. The aforementioned GRP tilt cab, introduced in 1962, was designated S24. S21 cab production continued until 1969.

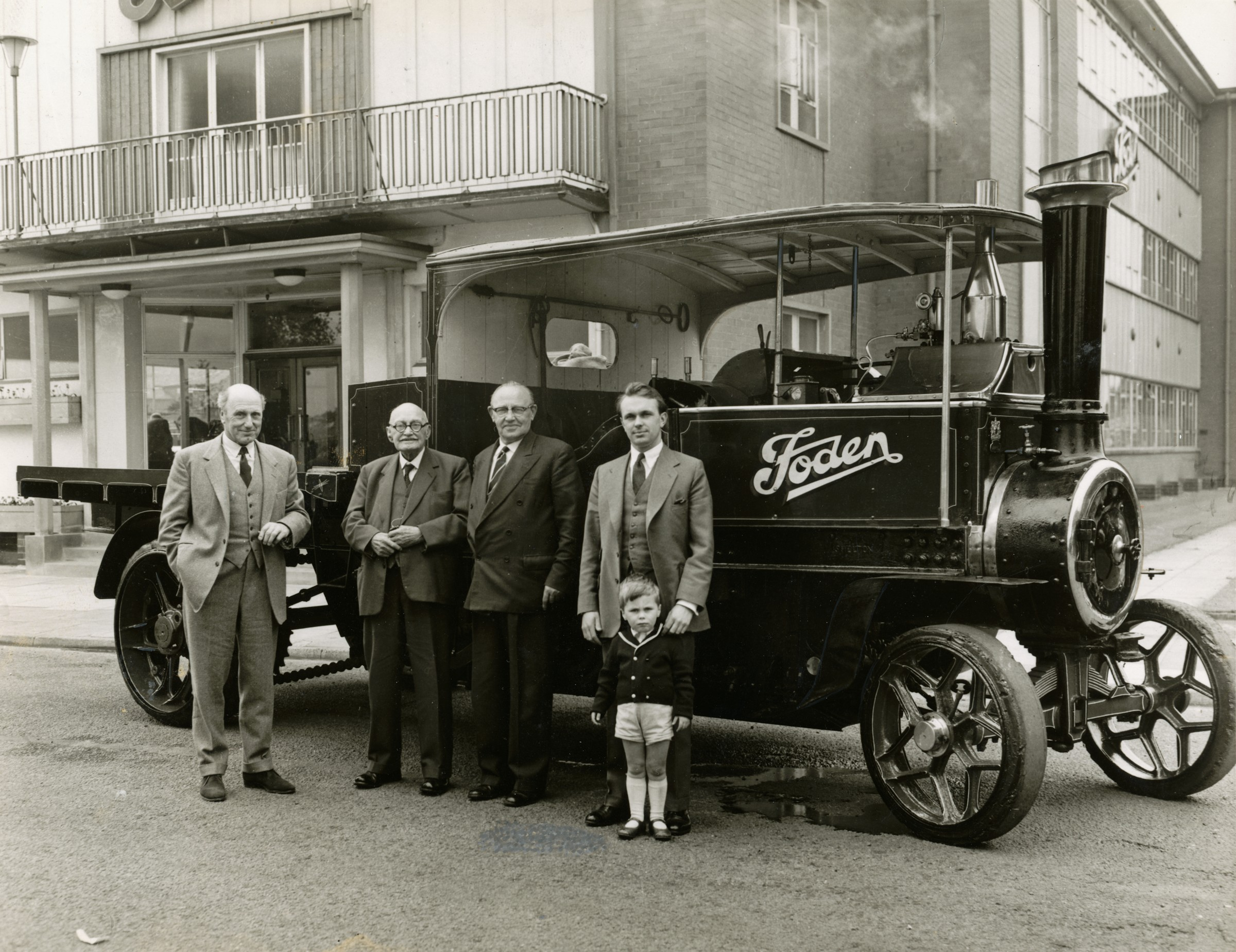
The Foden family, outside the Elworth factory, circa 1961: From L to R, (1) James Edwin Foden, son of William Foden, (2) William Foden, son of the founder Edwin Foden, (3) Reginal Gordon Foden, son of William Foden, (4) David Colville Foden, son of James Edwin Foden, (5) Hugh Foden, son of David Colville Foden, The vehicle is the "Pride of Edwin" a 5-ton compound-engined machine now held by the Science Museum at their Wroughton store.

In 1964, a change in the Construction and Use Regulations favoured articulated vehicles over the older rigid designs, and a new model was introduced to compete in the 32-ton market. More than 75% of heavy chassis sold in Britain in the following years were tractor units.

In 1969, Foden made its first sales in Portugal. Because the company name was similar to a profanity in Portuguese, they were badged as Podens.

=== Collapse and takeover ===
A massive new production facility was developed in the early 1970s on a greenfield site, adjacent to the Foden works. The new plant was designed for an annual capacity of 6,000 trucks, based on an expectation of a continued boom in truck sales and exports. Instead, the market collapsed. The expenditure and the economic downturn of the period made Foden run into financial difficulty in December 1974. It was given support by Harold Wilson's Labour government. Foden struggled as its home market continued to be depressed. Foden did not return to reasonable profitability until 1977-78. Large MOD contracts to supply military vehicles helped with this recovery. The military required fibreglass cabs (strengthened for military use), meaning that civilian Foden trucks were constructed in the same way.

After a period in receivership in 1980, the company was acquired by American firm Paccar. By 1986, Foden employed a workforce of 450, as compared to around 3,000 at the high point. Foden specialised in highly customisable trucks, offering any paint, any drivetrain available, and even split windscreen Kenworth C500 oilfield trucks were also built in small numbers at the Sandbach plant.

After the takeover of Leyland Trucks by Paccar in 1998, independent Foden production ceased, and was replaced by models of DAF Trucks rebadged as Fodens (DAF Trucks having been acquired by Paccar in 1996). These vehicles have had the option of either Caterpillar, Detroit Diesel or Cummins ISMe engines.

== Brand retirement ==
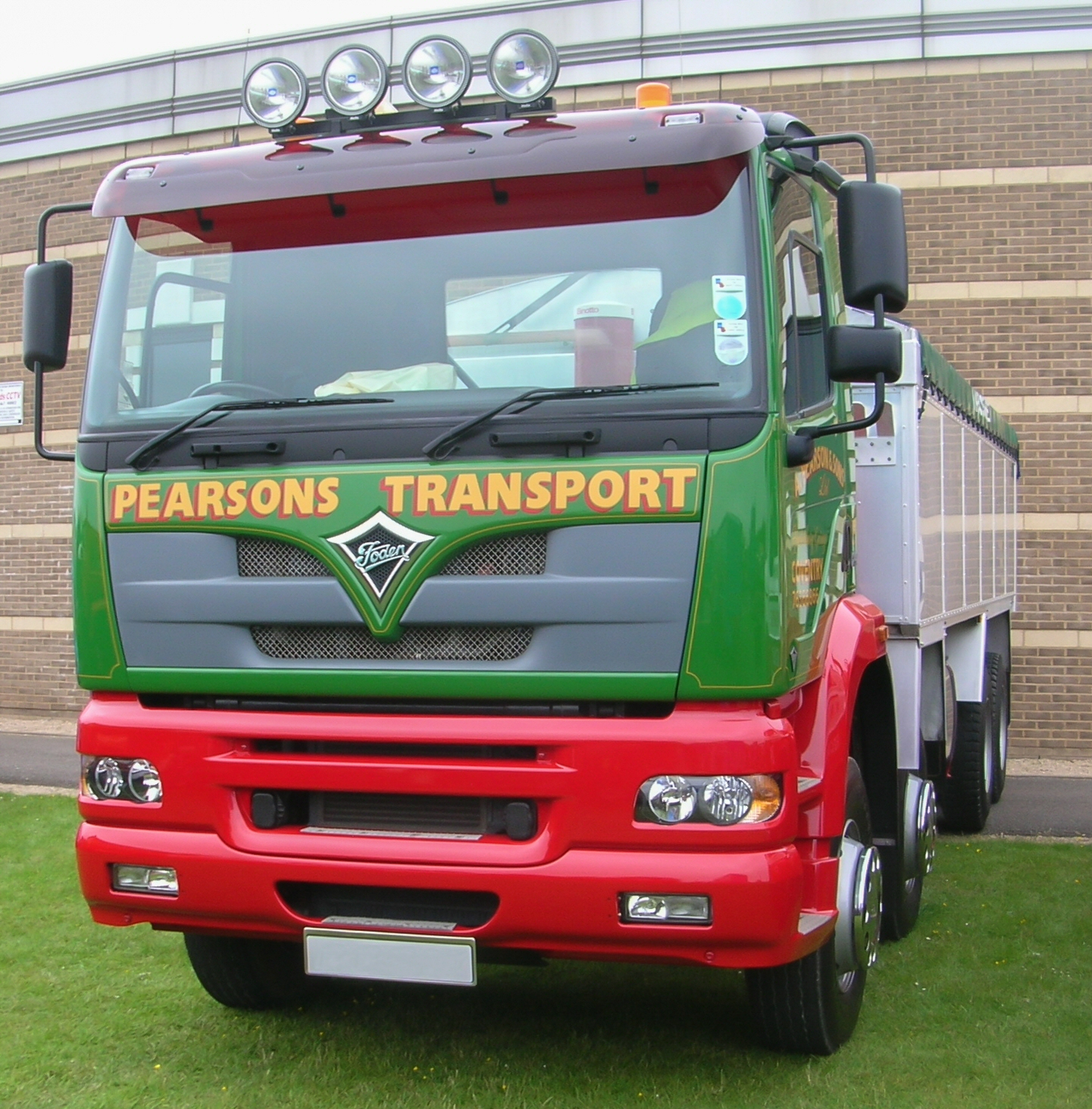
A 2004 Foden Alpha 3000

In 2005, Paccar announced that Foden production was likely to cease in 2006. The reason given was that Foden production would be terminated to release manufacturing capacity at Leyland Trucks to allow for increased volume of DAF-brand trucks. However, Leyland Trucks produced many other lorry models under the original Foden brandname until about 2010 according to several press articles and the commercial vehicle and machinery sales website mascus.com.

The last Foden was produced in July 2006, putting an end to 150 years of Foden truck manufacturing. The final vehicle to roll off the production line at the factory in Leyland was an 8x4 rigid, which was delivered to the nearby British Commercial Vehicle Museum.

== Preservation ==
A little over 110 Foden steam vehicles have been preserved of which the majority are wagons or tractors. A single Foden built Showman's road locomotive dating to 1910 survives.

== See also ==
- Fodens Ladies F.C.
