= John Fowler & Co. =

Steam engineering company founded by John Fowler

Coordinates: 53.7864905°N 1.5378145°W

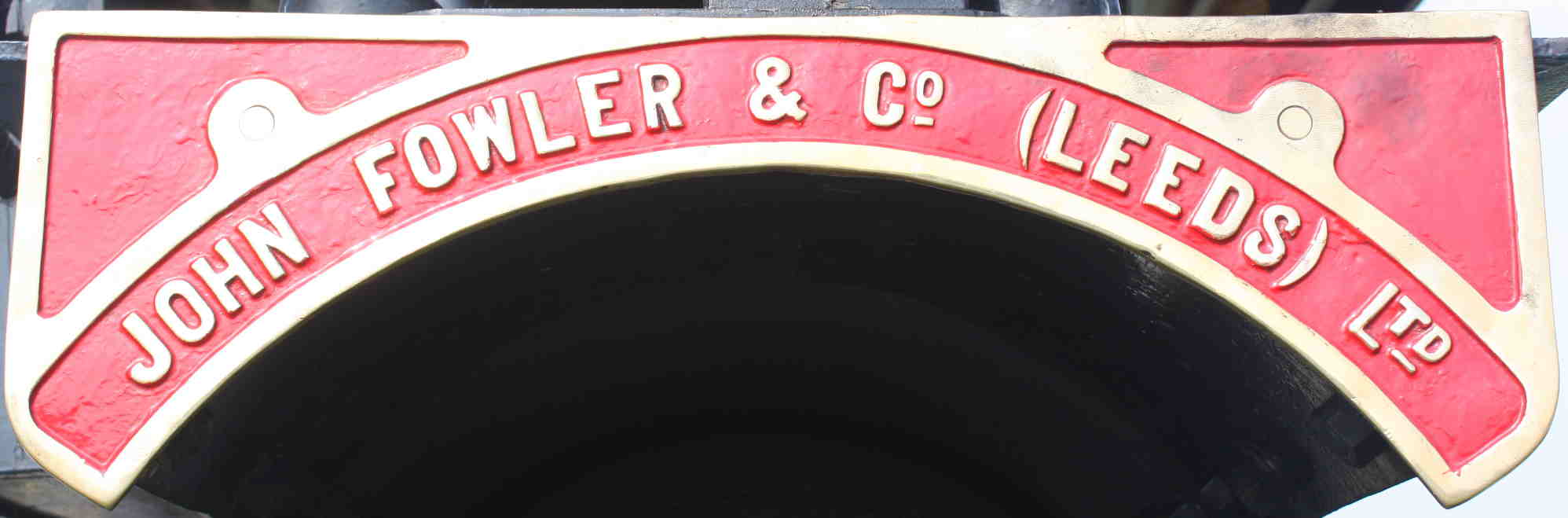
- Fowler nameplate on a Showman's engine
- Type: Limited company
- Industry: Engineering and manufacturing
- Founded: 1886; 140 years ago in Leeds, England
- Founder: John Fowler
- Defunct: 1947
- Fate: Merged
- Successor: Marshall-Fowler Ltd
- Headquarters: Leeds, England
- Products: Agricultural equipment; Tractors; Railway locomotives

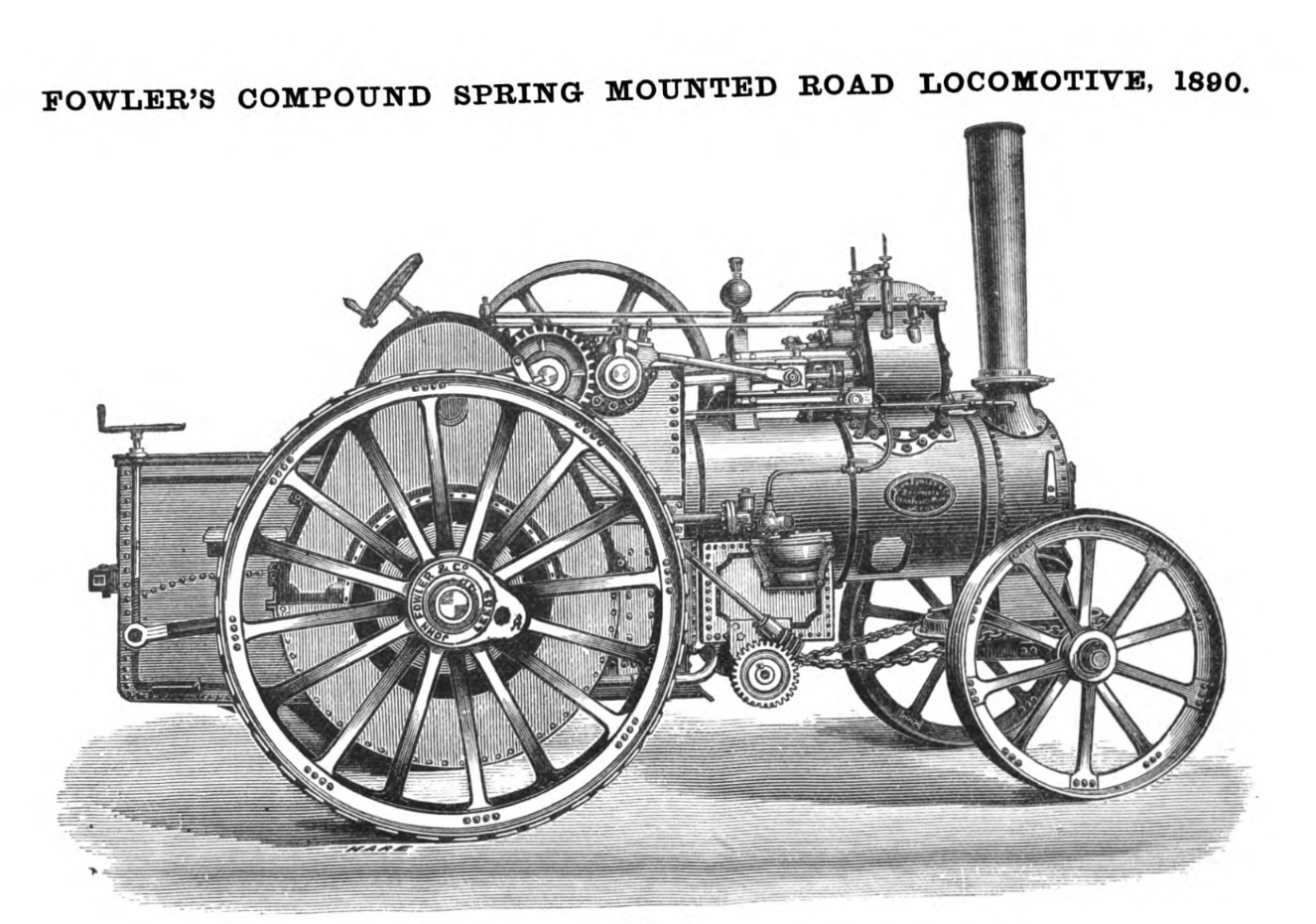
Fowler (1890)

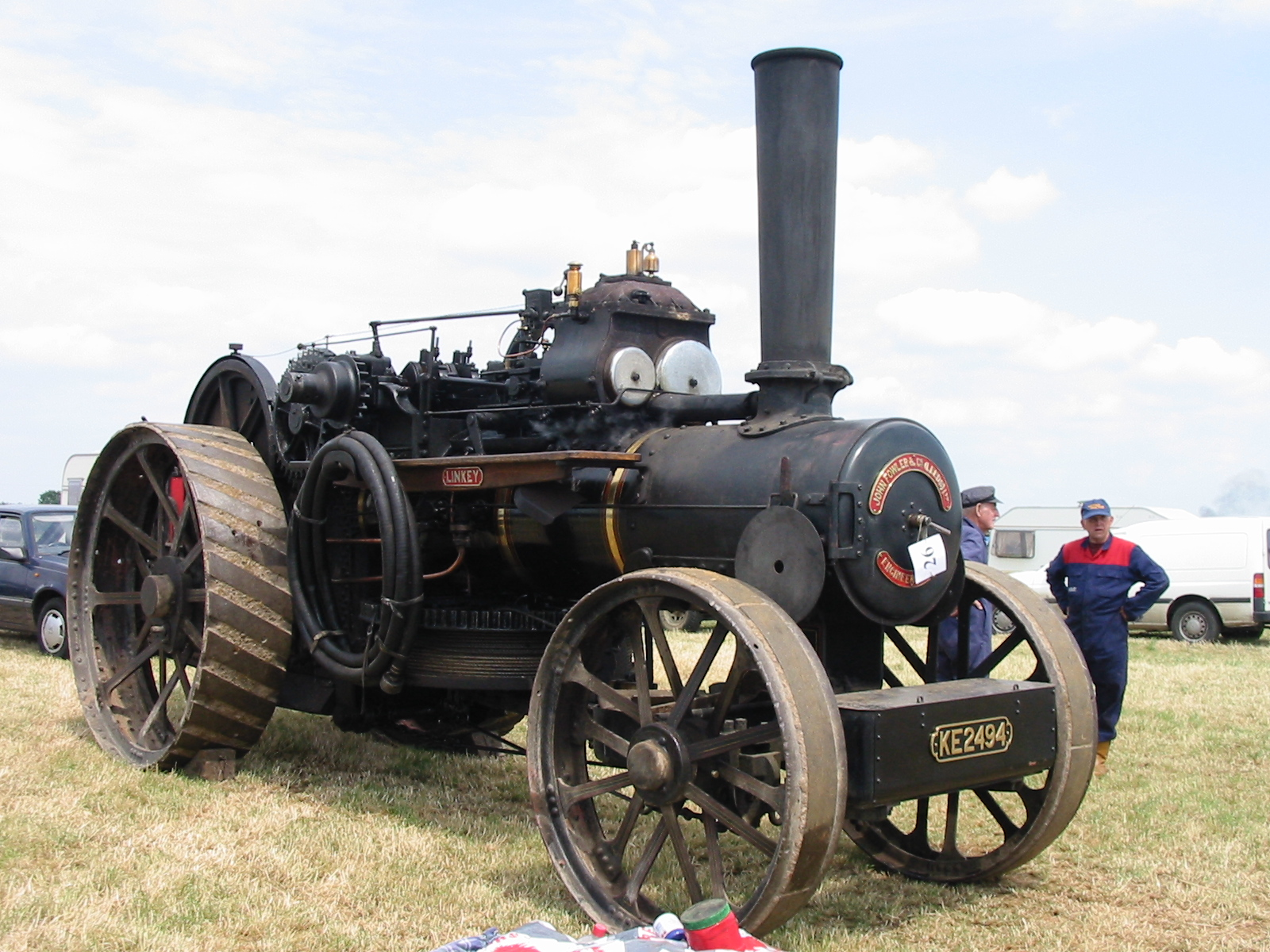
1916-built John Fowler & Co. 'K7' 12nhp ploughing engine, "Linkey"

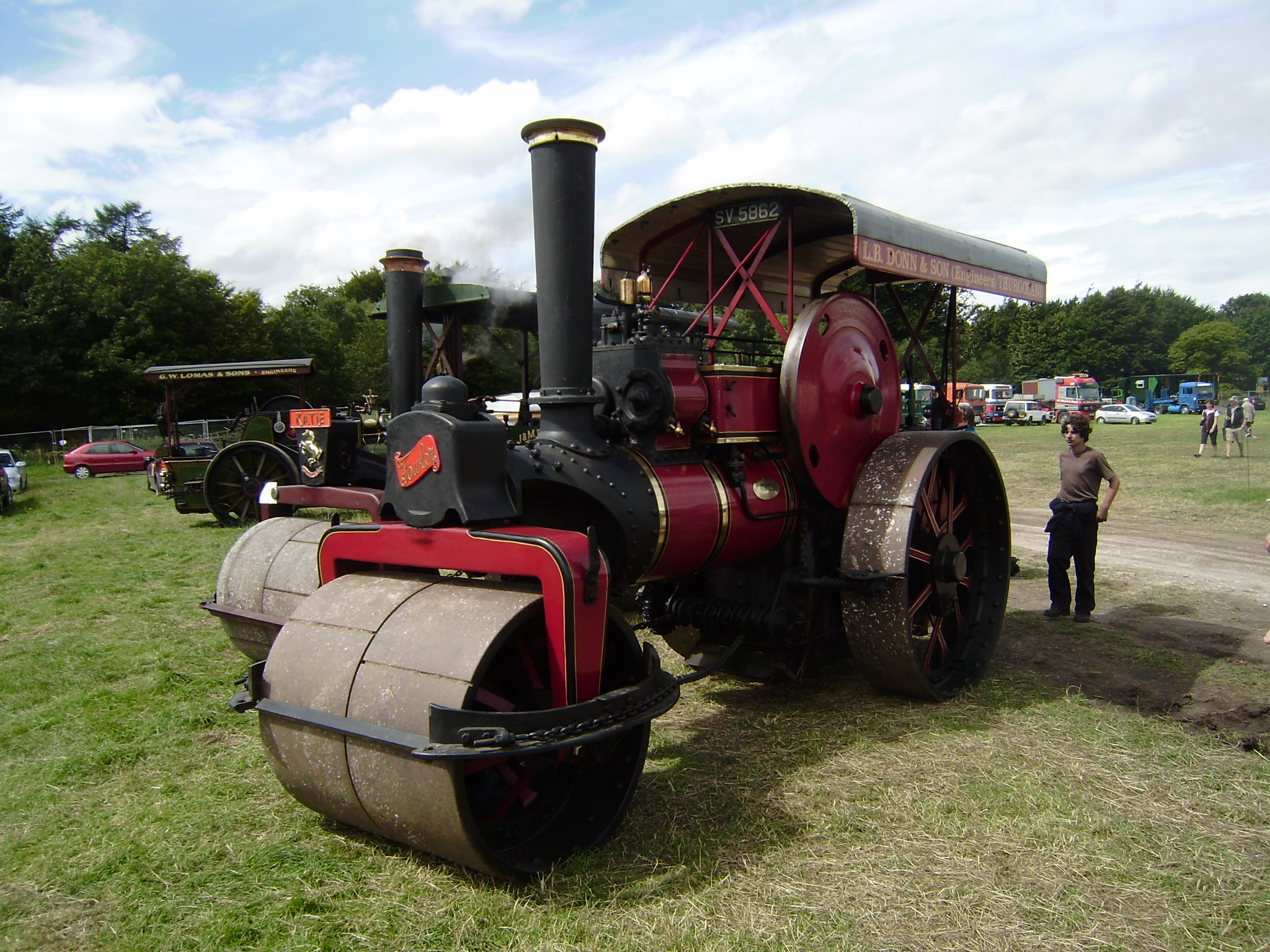
John Fowler & Co. steam roller of 1923

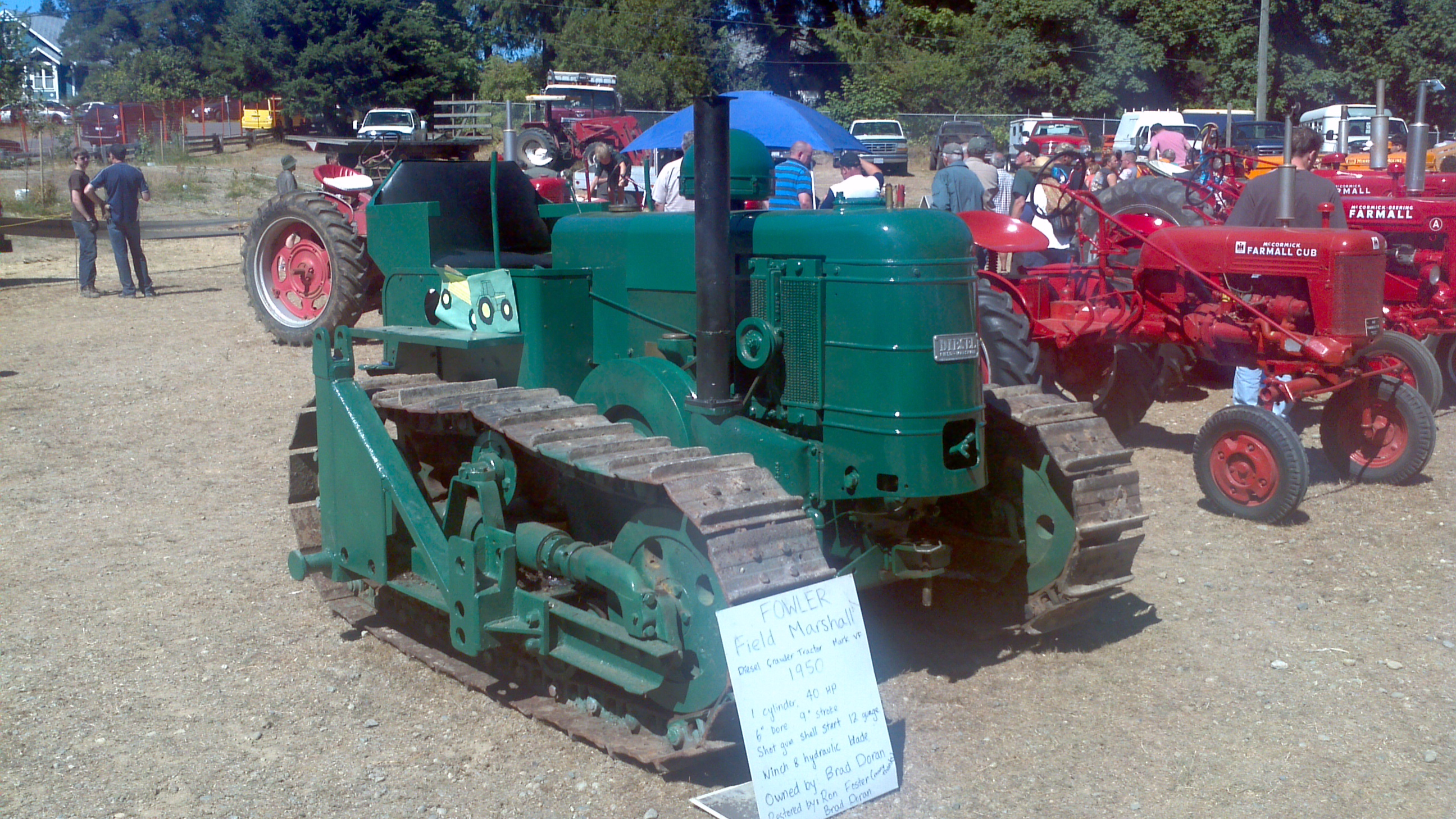
Fowler Tractor

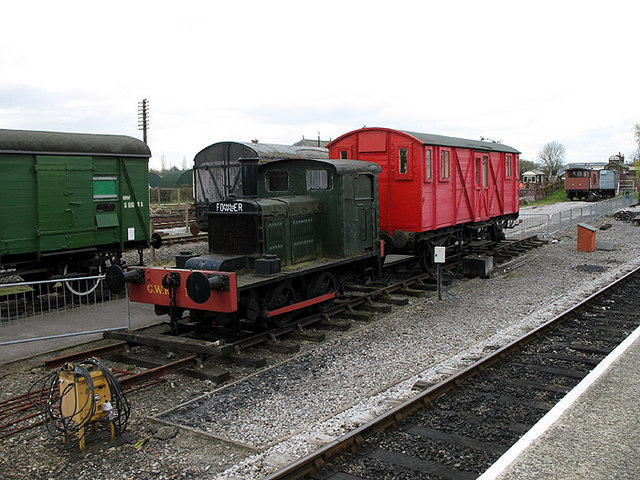
Fowler shunter, Buckinghamshire Railway Centre

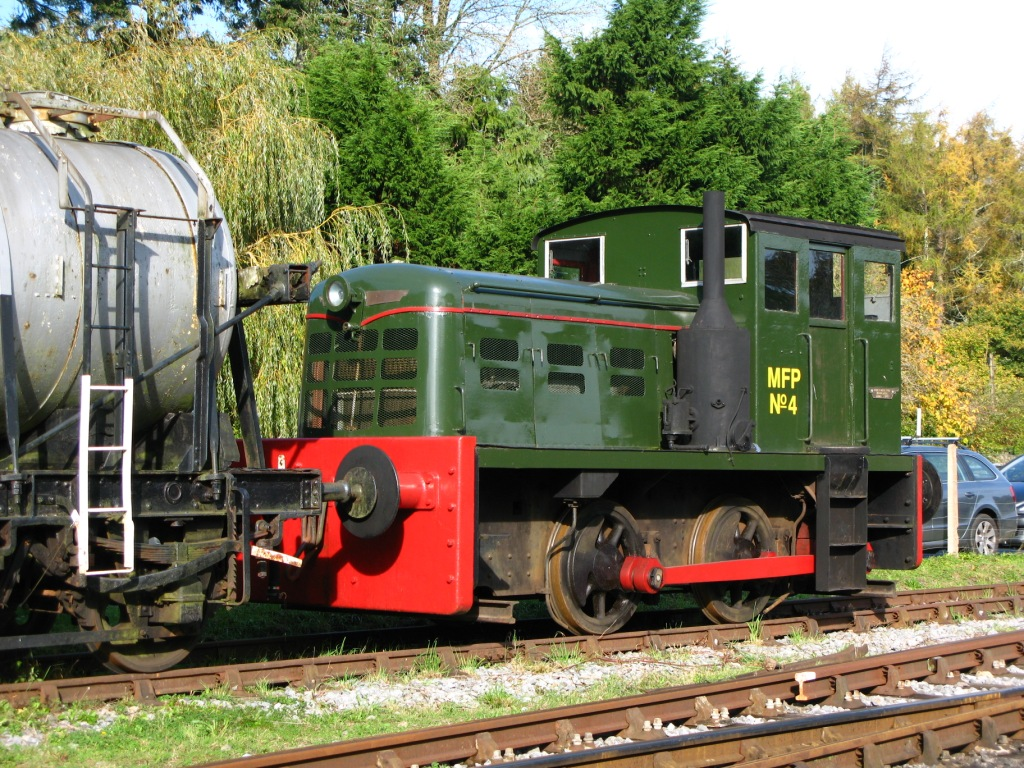
Fowler shunter on South Devon Railway

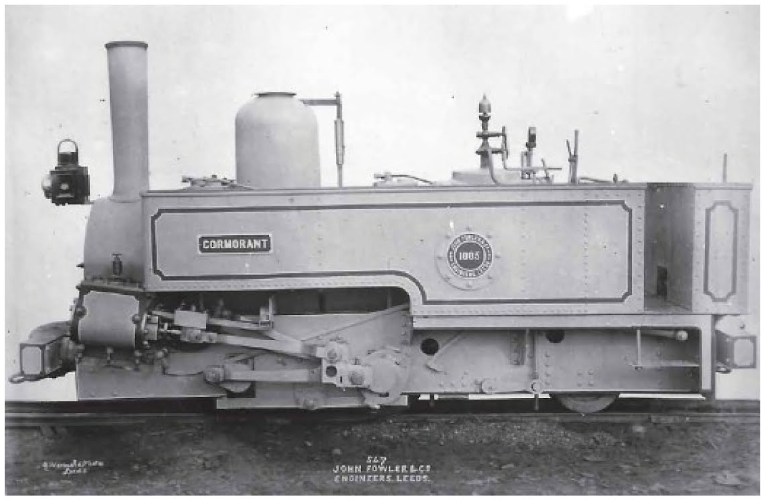
18 in (457 mm) gauge locomotive built for the Suakin Expedition

John Fowler & Co Engineers of Leathley Road, Hunslet, Leeds, West Yorkshire, England produced traction engines and ploughing implements and equipment, as well as railway equipment. Fowler also produced the Track Marshall tractor which was a tracked version of the Field Marshall. British Railways Engineering Department locomotives ED1 to ED7 were built by Fowler

== History ==
John Fowler was an agricultural engineer and inventor who was born in Wiltshire in 1826. He worked on the mechanisation of agriculture and was based in Leeds. He is credited with the invention of steam-driven ploughing engines. He died 4 December 1864, following a hunting accident. After his death, John Fowler & Co., was then continued by Robert Fowler and Robert Eddison. David Greig handled the day-to-day management. In 1886 the limited company of John Fowler & Co., (Leeds) Ltd., was formed. It merged with Marshall, Sons & Co., Ltd., of Gainsborough in 1947 to form Marshall-Fowler Ltd.

The company offered its first traction engines for sale in 1865. 1867 the company introduced three wheeled traction engines. The approach was not a success and the company abandoned the idea by the mid 1870s. In 1881 the company introduced its first compound traction engine.

Production of ploughing engines ceased in 1935. The last Fowler steam driven vehicle was a steam roller produced in 1937. The main products produced by Fowler during the 1930s were their range of tracked tractors, the FD2, FD3 and FD4, powered by Fowler-Sanders diesel engines of 2, 3, and 4 cylinders. They also produced the Fowler Gyrotiller from 1927 - this was a large tracked vehicle 34 foot long and 10 ft 6in wide powered initially by a 225 hp Ricardo petrol engine, later by a 170 hp MAN diesel. It was claimed it could convert virgin territory to seed-bed in one pass and at a rate of an acre per hour. Later versions of the gyrotiller were produced as attachments to the standard Fowler diesel crawler range with Fowler-Sanders engines of 30, 40 and 80 hp. A total of 88 gyrotillers were produced.

Although not well known for them, Fowler also built a small number (117 has been claimed) of steam wagons. These were vertical-boilered, with an unusual single-crank cross-compound vee-twin engine. They featured a gearbox (but no clutch) to provide a low drive ratio for climbing steep hills with heavy loads. At least one was preserved, as part of the Tom Varley collection.

During the Second World War, the Hunslet factory also produced Matilda, Cromwell, and Centaur tanks for the Army. Track castings were made at a Ministry of Supply factory built in 1943 at Sprotbrough, and after the war Fowler acquired this highly mechanised foundry. In 1947 Fowler came under the ownership of Marshall, Sons & Co. (themselves owned by Thomas W. Ward Ltd). The two companies produced agricultural tractors with Fowler focussing on the tracked versions, and Marshall on the wheeled versions. Although Fowler operated as a subsidiary of Marshall until at least 1966 the companies were eventually merged and the exhibits at the 1970 Smithfield show (three new Track Marshall tractors) are attributed to Marshall-Fowler Limited, John Fowler Works, Leeds.

Production at the Hunslet factory finally ceased in early 1974, by which time production of both tracked and wheeled tractors had been moved to the Marshall works at Gainsborough.

=== Construction equipment ===
In the 1950s it was known for the 'Challenger 3' vehicle, 95hp, for construction, built from 1950.

== Preservation ==
Around 700 Fowler engines have survived into preservation. These include 3 of the 4 Super Lions series of Showman's engines built in the 1930s.

=== Railway locomotives ===
Some locations of preserved Fowler railway locomotives include:

Australia

- Bennett Brook Railway, a tourist railway in Perth, Western Australia
- Leeds Fowler 11277: restored in Bundaberg, Australia
- Leeds Fowler, 0-6-0T, "Faugh-a Ballagh", preserved at Port Douglas, Australia.

Brazil

- Railway Museum in Jundiaí, SP (Brazil). Builder plates #1531 from 1870, she's a 4-4-0 for 5 ft 3 in (1,600 mm) gauge. Built for Companhia Paulista de Estradas de Ferro where she spent all of her active life and as CP's first locomotive she was numbered #1.

Germany

- Open Air Museum "Freilichtmuseum am Kiekeberg", near Hamburg, Germany

New Zealand

- Canterbury Steam Preservation Society, Christchurch, New Zealand
- Silver Stream Railway, Wellington, New Zealand
- Tokomaru Steam Museum, Tokomaru, New Zealand

India

- National Railway Museum, Delhi, India

Pakistan

- Changa Manga Forest Railway, Pakistan

United Kingdom

- Amberley Museum Railway
- Bredgar & Wormshill Light Railway
- East Kent Railway (heritage)
- Middleton Railway – Two Fowler locomotives
- Midland Railway Butterley
- Pontypool and Blaenavon Railway
- Ribble Steam Railway & Museum - diesel shunter no. 4160001
- Statfold Barn Railway
- Vale of Rheidol Railway Museum Collection - Not currently on public display
- Swanage Railway- Diesel Shunter 'May'- Under restoration
- Yorkshire Wolds Railway - diesel 0-6-0 Shunter no. 4240017 Patricia - Under restoration

=== Traction engines ===
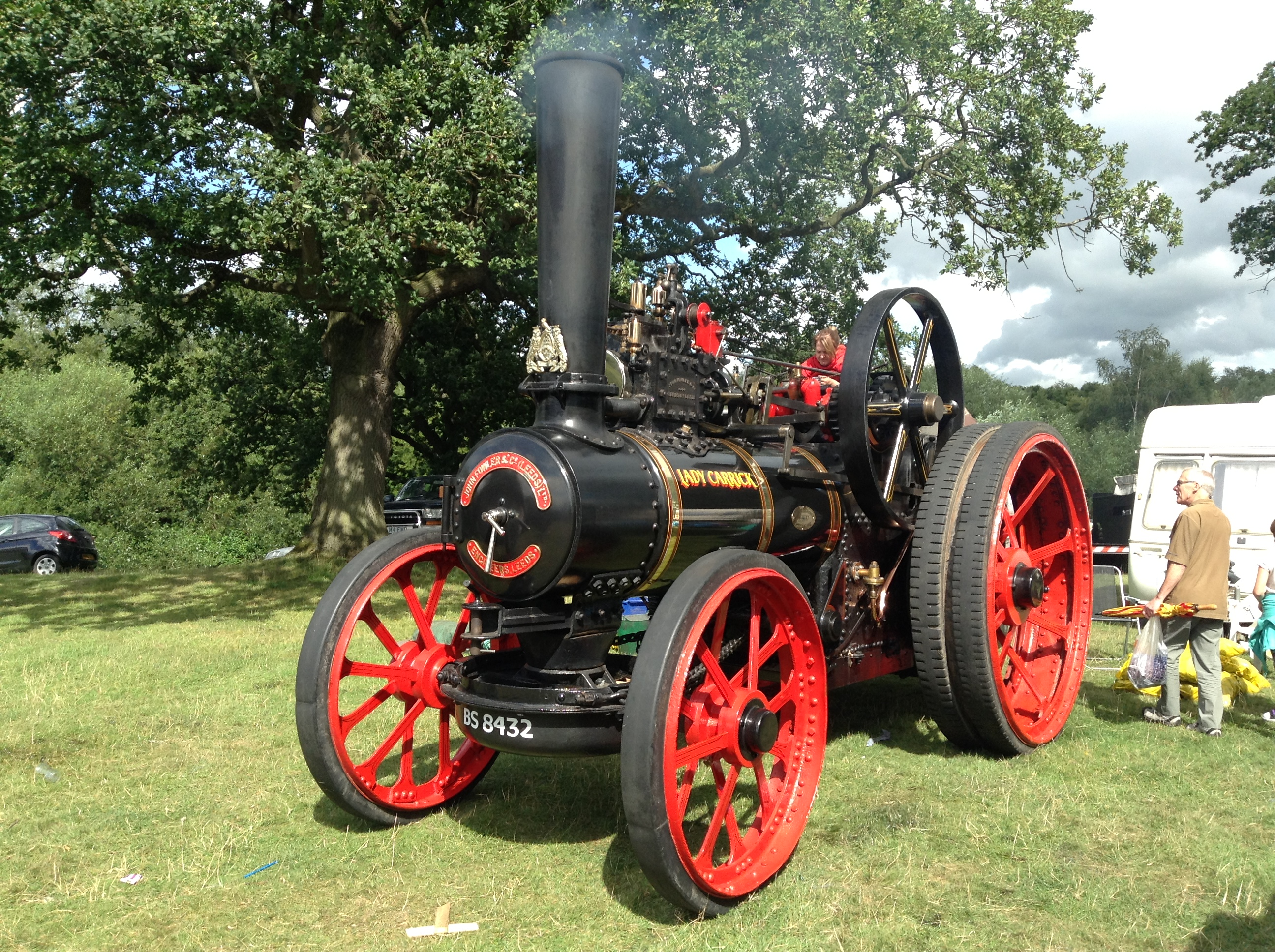
Fowler traction engine 'Lady Carrick'

- The Iron Maiden, a Fowler & Co.-built Showman's engine which was featured in the film, The Iron Maiden, is exhibited as part of the Scarborough Fair Collection of Fairground organs and machinery at events such as the Great Dorset Steam Fair.
- The Melbourne Steam Traction Engine Club of Melbourne, Victoria, Australia, a volunteer organisation dealing with the preservation of Australia's mechanical heritage, has several Fowler traction engines and steam rollers in preservation, some privately owned by members, and some owned by the club. Most are in restored, operating condition and are demonstrated to the public regularly. Club engines include one of a pair of Z7 ploughing engines.
- John Fowler 7nhp Steam Road Locomotive, Serial No 13037, in Wellington, New South Wales, Australia.
