= List of traction engine manufacturers =

This is a list of the more notable companies that manufactured traction engines of any kind, including steam tractors, portable engines, and steam rollers.

== Germany ==
- Borsig of Berlin, Germany
- Esterer, Germany (particularly known for their Ploughing engines)
- Freibahn of Spandau , Germany
- Hanomag, Hannover, Germany now part of Komatsu
- Henschel & Son, of Kassel, Germany
- Kemna Bau, Breslau, (then) Germany
- Heinrich Lanz AG, of Mannheim, Germany
- Otto Meyer KG, Wellentrup, Germany ( Media related to Ottomeyer ploughing engines in Emsland Moormuseum at Wikimedia Commons)
- Rudolf Ernst Wolf, Magdeburg, Germany ( Media related to R. Wolf portable engines at Wikimedia Commons)
- Ruthemeyer, Stadthalle Soest, Germany ( Media related to Ruthemeyer vehicles at Wikimedia Commons)
- Scharer & Gross, Germany ( Media related to Scharrer & Groß at Wikimedia Commons)
- Zettelmeyer, Germany ( Media related to Zettelmeyer vehicles at Wikimedia Commons)

== Great Britain ==
There were a large number of manufacturers in Great Britain. Most started life as agricultural engineers, and many exported engines all over the world. Some of the manufacturers are listed below:

- Alfred Dodman & Co.
- William Allchin, Northampton – (MERL database entry)
- John Allen & Company, Oxford - best Known for the Allen Scythe.
- Aveling & Porter, Rochester, Kent
- Bristol Wagon & Carriage Works Built steam wagons from 1904 to 1908
- Brown & May, Devizes, Wiltshire
- Charles Burrell & Sons, Thetford, Norfolk – (MERL database entry)
- Clayton & Shuttleworth, Lincoln – (MERL database entry)
- Edwin Foden, Sons & Company, Sandbach, Cheshire
- Durham and North Yorkshire Steam Cultivation Company
- William Foster & Co, Lincoln
- G J Fowell & Co, St Ives, Huntingdonshire
- John Fowler & Company, Leeds, Yorkshire
- Gibbons & Robinson
- Thomas Green & Son, Leeds, Yorkshire.
- James & Frederick Howard, Bedford
- Mann's Patent Steam Cart and Wagon Company, Leeds, Yorkshire
- Marshall, Sons & Co., Gainsborough, Lincolnshire
- J&H McLaren & Co., Leeds, Yorkshire
- Paxman, Colchester, Suffolk
- Ransomes, Sims & Jefferies, Ipswich, Suffolk
- Richard Garrett & Sons, Leiston, Suffolk
- Robey & Co, Lincoln – (MERL database entry)
- Ruston & Hornsby, Lincoln
- Frederick Savage, King's Lynn, Norfolk - Portable centre engines for amusement rides
- Sentinel Waggon Works, Shrewsbury, Shropshire - Utilised vertical boilers
- Tasker & Sons, Andover, Hampshire
- William Tuxford & Sons, Boston, Lincolnshire.
- Wallis & Steevens, Basingstoke, Hampshire – (MERL database entry)
- Yorkshire Patent Steam Wagon Co. Leeds, Yorkshire

== North America ==
Key: '~' indicates a manufacturer for whom no known products survive.

- Advance Thresher Co. – later merged with the M. Rumely Co. to create Advance-Rumely Thresher Co.
- Advance-Rumely Thresher Co., La Porte, Indiana
- ~Althaus Ewing & Co.
- ~American Engine Co.
- American-Abell Engine and Thresher Company, Toronto, Ontario

Amongst other models, built three-wheelers with a single wheel mounted on a fork perch bracket beneath the smokebox.

- Ames Iron Works
- ~Atlas Engine Works
- Aultman Co.
- Aultman-Taylor Machinery Co.
- Avery Power Machinery Co., Peoria, Illinois
- A.D. Baker Company
- Best Manufacturing Company, San Leandro, California
- Birdsall Engine Co.
- Blumentritt Co.
- Buffalo-Pitts Steam Roller Co.
- Buffalo-Springfield Roller Co.
- ~Byron, Jackson Machine Works
- Case, J.I. Co.
- Colean Mfg. Co.
- C & G Cooper & Co's.
- Crowel Mfg. Co.
- Clyde Iron Works Co., Duluth, MN
- D. June & Co.
- ~Davidson & Rutledge
- Farquhar, A.B. Co.
- ~Fishkill Landing Machine Co.
- Frick & Co.
- Gaar Scott & Co.
- Geiser Manufacturing, makers of the Peerless line of steam tractors, later bought out by Emerson-Brantingham
- ~George W. Morris
- ~George Page & Co.
- George White & Sons Co. Ltd., London and Brandon, Canada.
- Greyhound, Banting Mfg. Co.
- Groton, Charles Perrige & Co.
- ~Hagerstown Steam Engine & Machine Co.
- ~Harrisburg Car Mfg. Co.
- Harrison Machine Works (Jumbo)
- Heilman Machine Works
- ~Holt Manufacturing Company (became Caterpillar Inc.)
- ~Hooven, Owens & Rentschler Co.
- Huber Manufacturing Co.
- Illinois Thresher Co.
- ~Jacob Price
- ~James Means & Co.
- John Goodison Thresher Co. Ltd., Sarnia, Ontario, Canada
- ~J.M. Ross & Sons, St. Catharines, Ontario, Canada.
- Keck-Gonnerman Co., Mount Vernon, Indiana
- O.S. Kelly Co., Springfield, Ohio
- Kitten, Ferdinand Foundry Co.
- ~Koppes W.M. & Co.
- Lang & Button Co., Ithaca, New York
- Lansing Iron Works Co. Lansing, Michigan
- Leader, Marion Mfg. Co., Marion, Ohio
- MacDonald Thresher Co., Stratford, Ontario, Canada
- McNamer Co., Newark, Ohio
- ~Merritt & Kellogg, Battle Creek, Michigan
- ~Messinger Mfg. Co., Tatamy, Pennsylvania
- Minneapolis Threshing Machine Co., Hopkins, Minn.
- ~Morningstar Mfg. Co. (Napoleon), Napoleon, Ohio
- ~Muncy Traction Engine Co., Muncy, Pennsylvania
- New-Giant, Northwest Thresher Co., Stillwater, Minn.
- New Hamburg Mfg. Co. Ltd., New Hamburg, Ontario, Canada
- Nichols & Shepard Co., Battle Creek, Michigan
- ~Ohio Engine & Thresher Co., Upper Sandusky, Ohio
- ~Owens, Lane & Duyer Co., Hamilton, Ohio
- Peerless, Geiser Mfg. Co., Waynesboro, Pennsylvania
- Peterson N. C. & Sons, Sarnia, Ontario, Canada
- Port Huron Engine & Thresher Co., Port Huron, Mich.
- Reeves & Co., Columbus, Indiana
- ~Remington Co., Woodburn, Oregon
- Robert-Bell Engine & Thresher Co., Seaforth, Ontario, Canada
- ~Roberts & Dean Co., Sacramento, California
- Robinson & Co., Richmond, Indiana
- M Rumley Co., LaPorte, Indiana – later merged with the Advance Thresher Co. to create Advance-Rumely Thresher Co.
- Russell & Company (Steam Tractor), Massillon, Ohio (1848–1962)
- ~Ryan & McDonald, Waterloo, New York
- Sawyer-Massey & Co. Ltd., Hamilton, Ontario, Canada after merger with Harris to form Massey-Harris later became Massey Ferguson
- Scheidler, R. Co., Newark, Ohio
- Springfield Engine & Thresher Co., Springfield, Ohio (later became OS Kelly Co and Kelly Springfield)
- Stevens, A. W. & Son Co., Auburn, New York
- Stevens, A. W. Co., Marinette, Wisconsin
- Twentieth Century Mfg. Co., Marinette, Wisconsin
- ~Union-Iron Works (Walker), Newark, Ohio
- Upton Mfg. Co., Port Huron, Michigan
- Waterloo Mfg. Co. Ltd., Waterloo, Ontario, Canada
- Waterous Engine Works Co. Ltd., Bradford, Ontario, Canada
- Watertown Engine Company, Watertown, New York
- Westinghouse Co., Schenectady, New York Westinghouse Farm Engine
- Wood Brothers Thresher Co., Des Moines, Iowa
- Wood, S.W. & Son Co., Clyde, New York
- Wood, Taber & Morse Co., Eaton, New York

== Rest of the world ==
- Aillot, France
- Munktells Mekaniska Verkstad, Sweden (not Bolinders), now part of Volvo group
- Vølund (virksomhed), Denmark now part of Babcock & Wilcox

== See also ==
- List of tractor manufacturers
- List of former tractor manufacturers
- List of steam energy topics
- List of steam car makers
