= Pistol boiler =

Steam boiler design

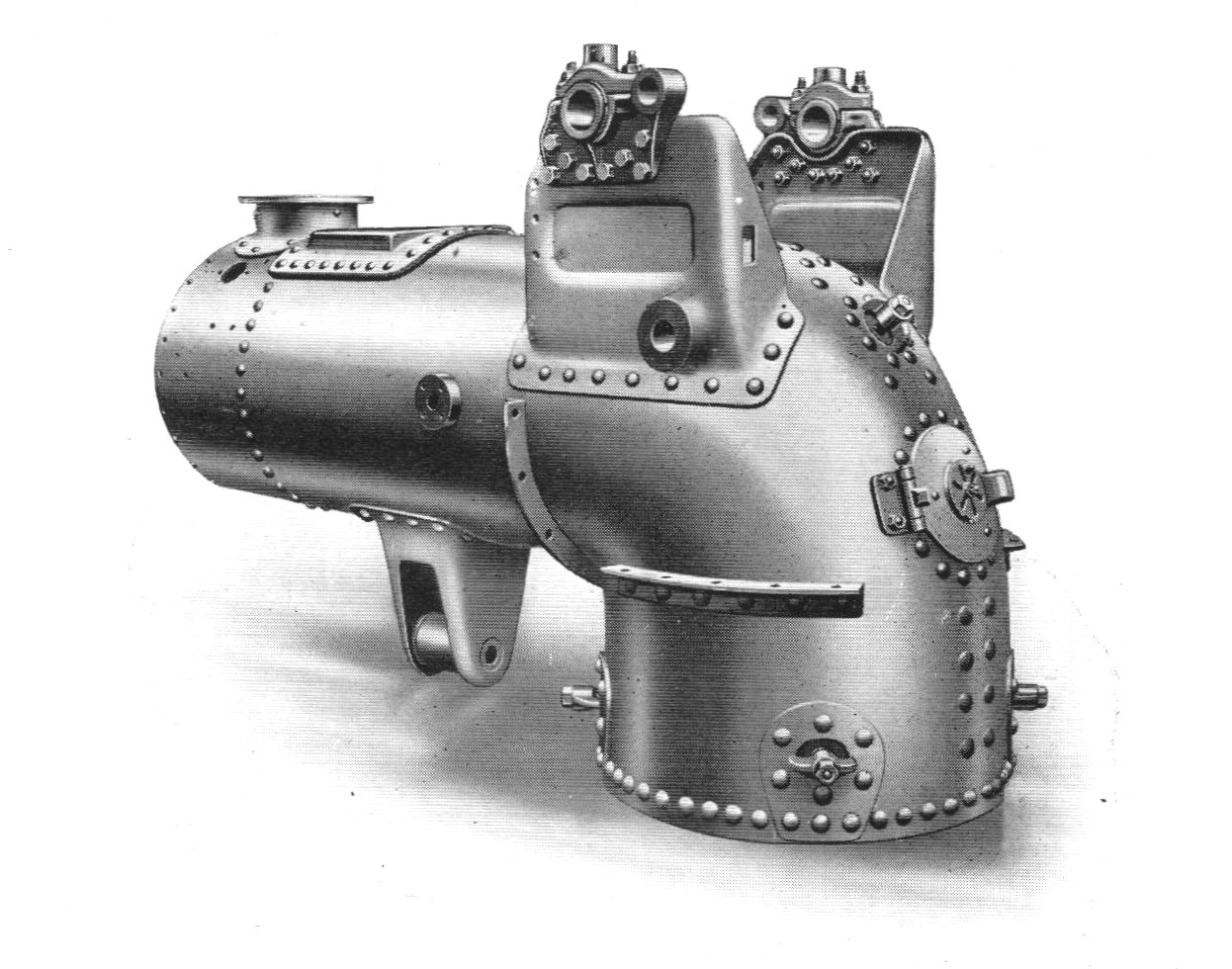
Ransome boiler

A pistol boiler is a design of steam boiler used in light steam tractors and overtype steam wagons. It is noted for the unusual shape of the firebox, a circular design intended to be self-supporting without the use of firebox stays.

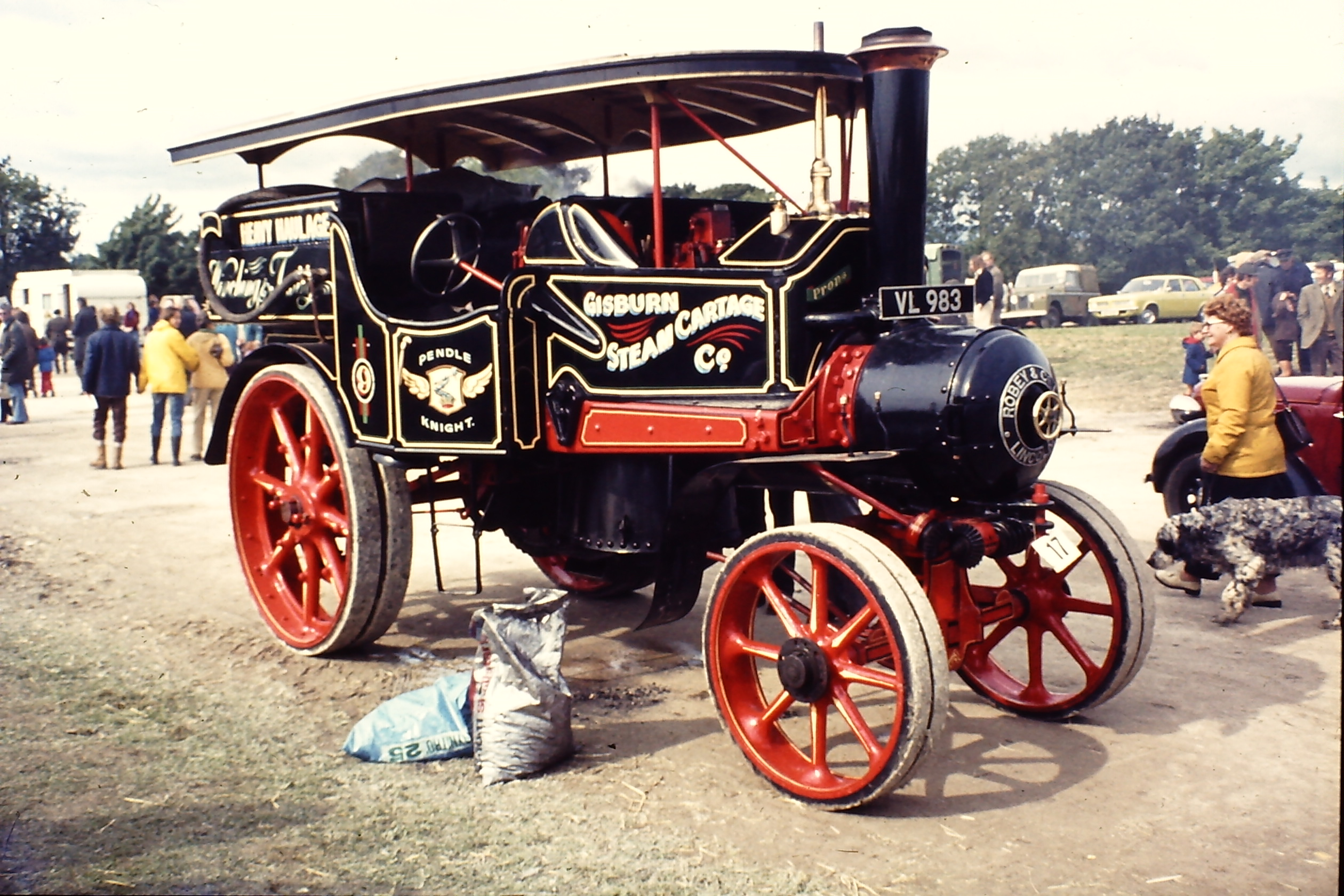
Robey & Co. 'Express' steam tractor, with Robey's pistol boiler

The name "pistol boiler" derives from the smooth curve of the outer firebox flowing into the boiler barrel and a supposed resemblance to the stock of an early 19th-century pistol.

== Need for a self-supporting firebox ==
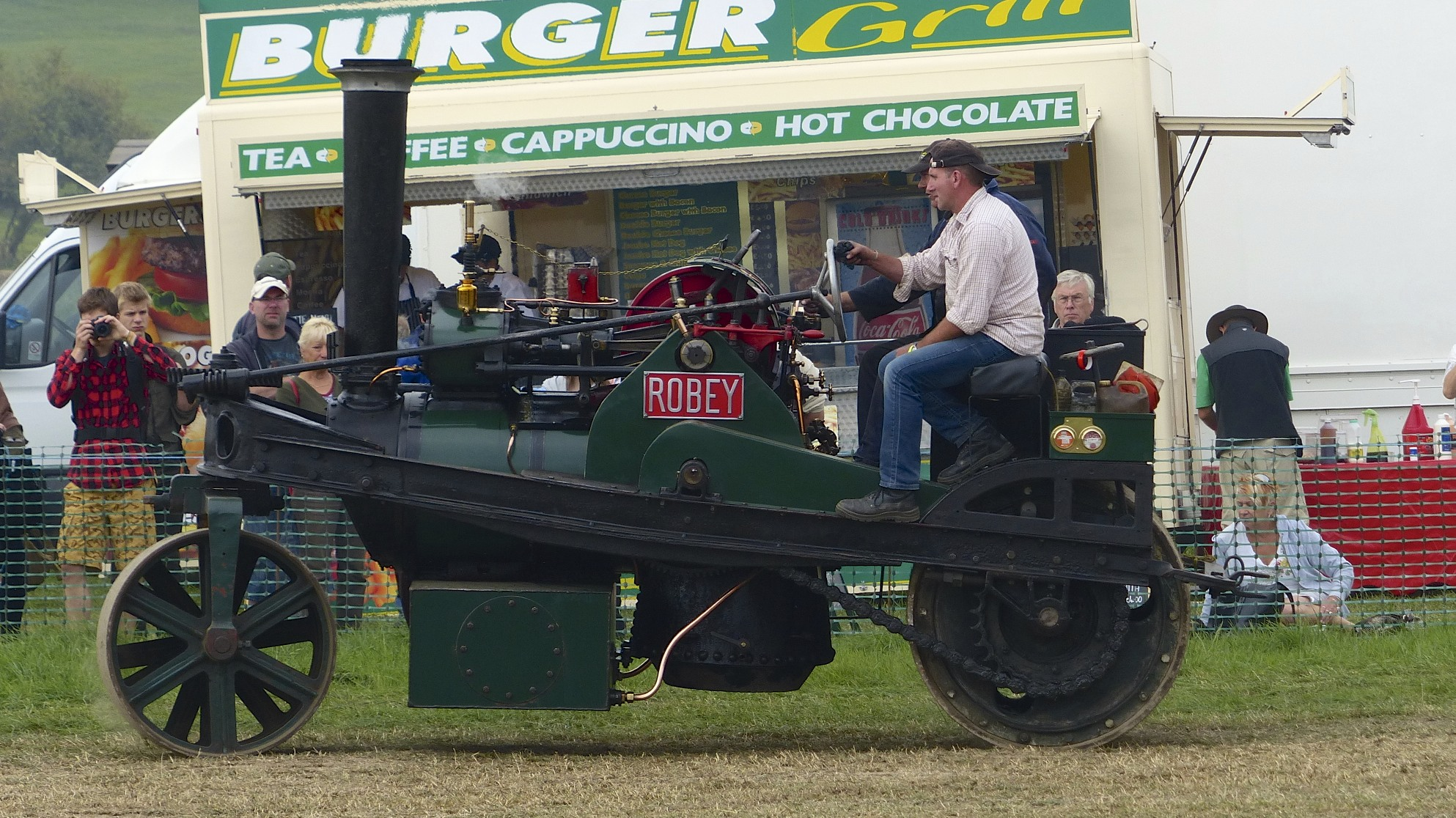
Robey tandem roller

The locomotive boiler had become well established since Stephenson's day; although the cost and complexity of its firebox remained a drawback, particularly for small boilers. If the top crown sheet of the inner firebox was made flat, so as to maintain a constant water depth above it, this required complex and expensive girder stays to support it. These stays were also a safety-critical part of the boiler, and many past boiler explosions had been caused by their failure. This was especially so for boilers that were likely to be used at all carelessly or by crews who were less skilled or well-trained.

Clearly the market for small steam traction engines could make use of a novel boiler design that avoided these problems. Following the lead of the London and Birmingham Railway's Bury locomotives, some small portable engines were already using cylindrical stayless fireboxes. These combined a cylindrical vertical drum with a domed top, both shapes that could support themselves well under pressure. In extreme cases for larger railway locomotives, these became the massive brass-clad 'Haycock' fireboxes that were so distinctive on early Great Western Railway locomotives.

== Development of the pistol boiler ==
The firm of Robey & Co., well-known builders of both large stationary engines and small steam tractors, developed its own version of this stayless domed firebox as the pistol boiler.

As the boiler was small, with a barrel diameter of only 2 in (51 mm), it was practical to form the deeply curved plates for the inner and outer firebox with a hydraulic press. The inner firebox was formed in one piece as a truncated cone with a domed top. Although a small boiler, this gave a large grate area that permitted the burning of coke as a fuel. The front face of this cone was flattened inwards to form the firebox tubeplate. 54 1.5 in (38 mm) fire-tubes were used. The boiler barrel was cylindrical, but the lower part of the rear end was cut on a diagonal rather than straight across. The lower part of the outer firebox was also conical and wrapped over this diagonal edge. The foundation ring was circular, avoiding the problems of mud build-up in the corners. The upper corner of the outer firebox was a separate plate, approximately a quarter of a sphere. Rather than the time-consuming and costly flanging of flat plates, these curved plates could be pressed and riveted together almost immediately. The number of boiler plates was also reduced from the usual eight to only five. (Note: Boiler barrel, upper firebox, lower firebox, inner firebox, smokebox tubeplate.) A relatively high working pressure of 250 psi (1.7 MPa) could be used.

The firebox door was also of novel design. As the backplate sloped so steeply, the door was top-hinged and opened inwards rather than outwards. This also acted as a deflector plate, directing the cold draught down onto the firebed rather than directly across and into the tubes.

Robey used this design of boiler on their 6-ton steam wagons and 'Express' steam tractors, (Note: Nine 'Express' tractors were built, two survive.) also their tandem steamrollers. One of these rollers was the first artefact to be preserved by the Robey Trust. When the boiler was re-barreled in 1988, this was the last boiler to be constructed by the Robey factory before closure. On their larger engines, Robey used a conventional boiler.

== Related designs ==
A similar pistol boiler was also used by Foden in their 'O-type' Speed Six and Speed Twelve steam wagons. They were also used by Ransomes for their overtype steam wagons in the 1920s.

The firm of Garrett also sought a reliable stayless firebox for their smaller boilers at around the same time in the 1920s. Their solution was more conventional: a conventional outer firebox enclosed an inner firebox, where the inner crown sheet was formed into a curved valley. For a small firebox, this acted as a girder stay between the end sheets of the firebox and was sufficient to be self-supporting. The portable engines used this pattern alone. For the slightly more powerful road tractor boilers, the inner firebox was still self-supporting but the outer wrapper now required crosswise sling stays to support it, where previously it would have been supported by the stays to the inner firebox.
