= Bryan Steam Car =

Defunct American motor vehicle manufacturer

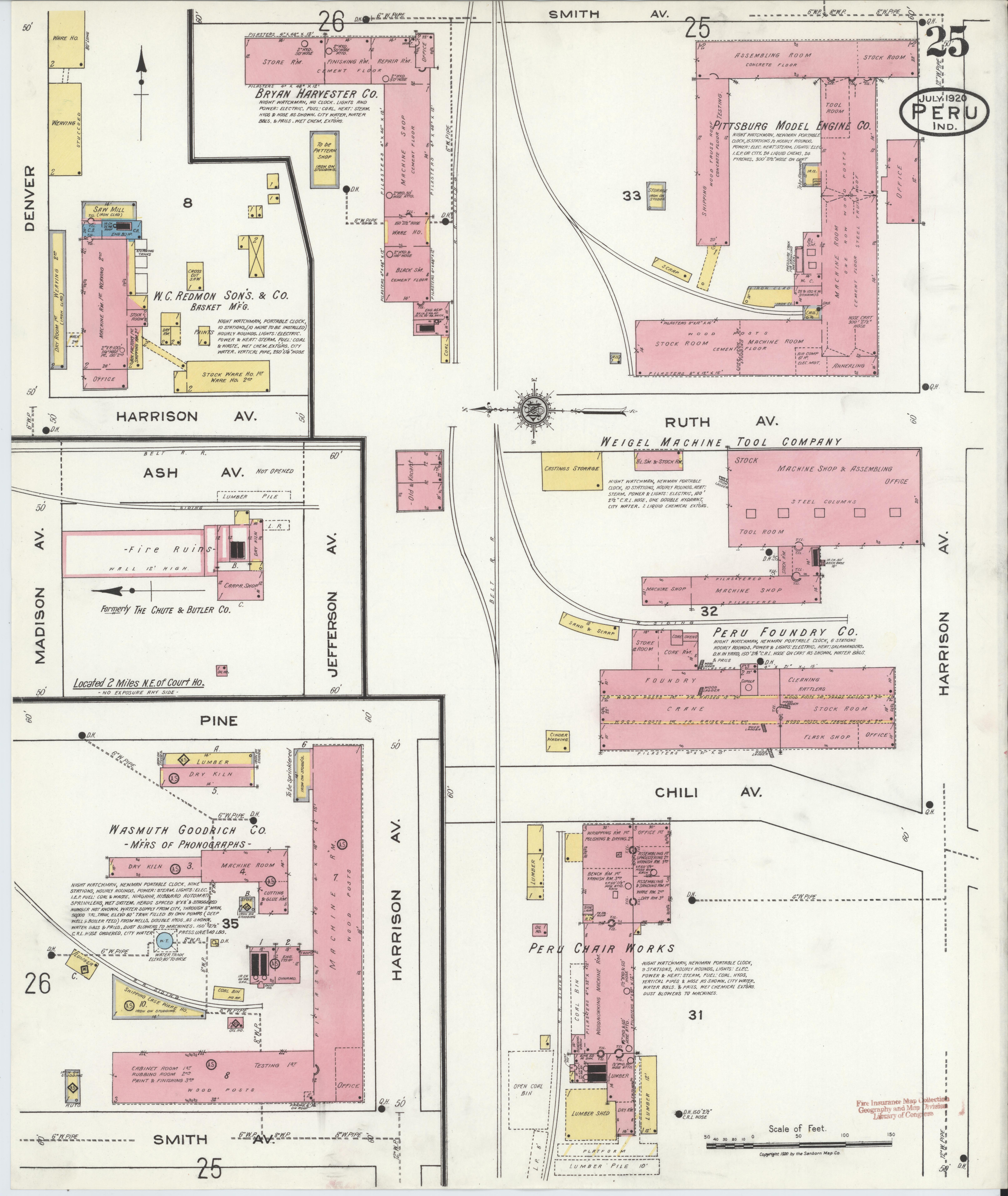
Bryan Steam Car plant (1920), also referred to as Bryan Steam Motors and Bryan Harvester Company.

The Bryan Steam Car was an American steam car manufactured from 1918 until 1923.

== Background ==
The car was produced by Bryan Steam Motors of Peru, Indiana, a company which built mainly steam-driven tractors and trucks. The company was founded by George A Bryan, who had been employed by the Santa Fe Railroad, working his way up from engine wiper to chief inspector. Bryan adapted the superheating system used in locomotives to small engines for cars and tractors. A total of six vehicles, all touring cars, were built under this badge; most, if not all, were intended for company officials.

A sports sedan was announced for 1921, but never materialized.
