= Index of steam energy articles =

- portable engine
- steam aircraft
- (steam ball) aeolipile
- (steam bath) sauna
- steam brig
- steam bus
- steam cannon
- steam car
- steam crane
- steam donkey
- steam dummy (dummy engine)
- (steam electric power plant) fossil fuel power plant (FFPP)
- (steam electrolysis) high-temperature electrolysis
- steam engine
- stationary steam engine
- steam explosion
- steam fair
- Steam generator (boiler) steam generator
- Steam generator (nuclear power)
- steam hammer
- steam locomotive
  - steam locomotive nomenclature
  - steam locomotives of British Railways
  - Steam Locomotives of Ireland
- steam power during the Industrial Revolution
- steam railroad
- steam reforming
- steam rupture
- steam shovel
- (steam sterilizer) autoclave
- steam tank (vehicle)
- steam tractor
- (steam train)–see steam locomotive
- steam tricycle
- steam turbine
- steam turbine locomotive
- steamboat
- steamroller
- steam whistle
- traction engine

== See also ==
- List of environment topics
- Category:Steam road vehicles
