= Mann's Patent Steam Cart and Wagon Company =

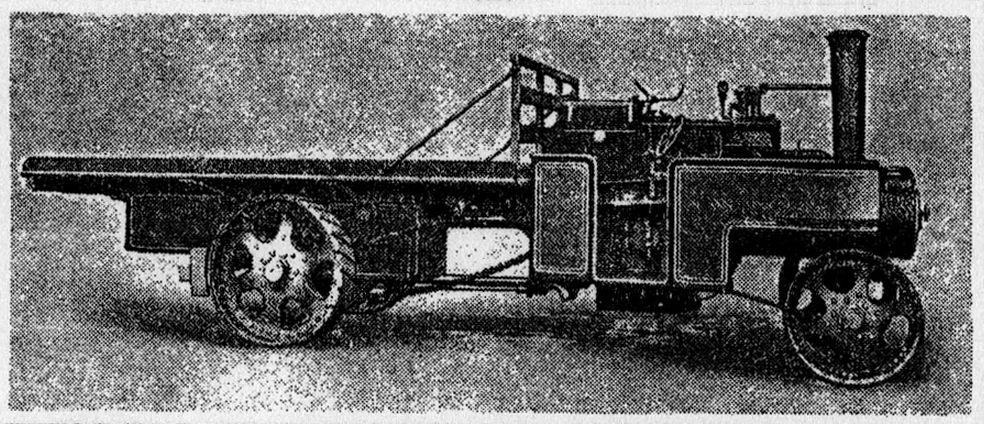
Mann's Patent Steam Cart

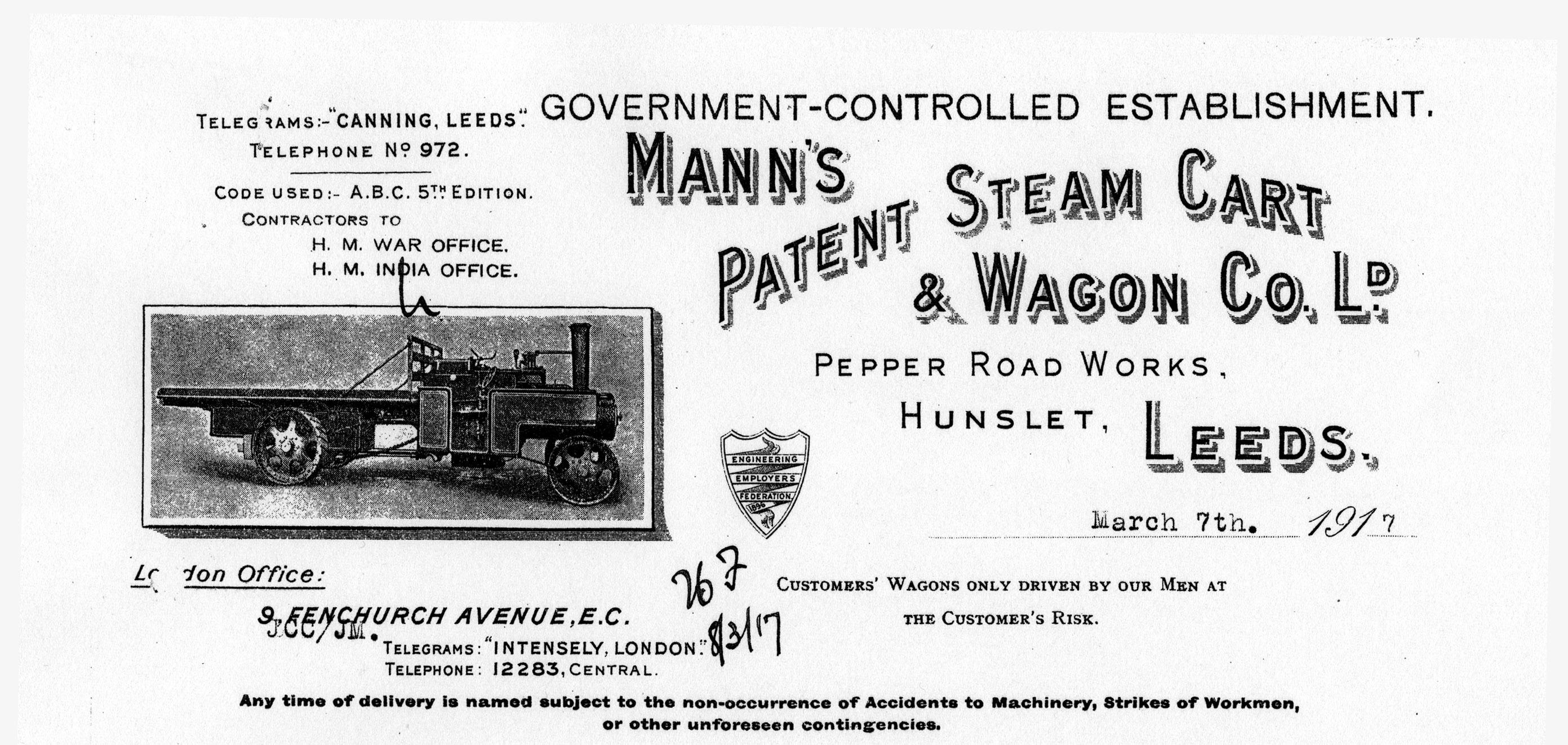
Letterhead from Mann's Patent Steam Cart and Wagon Company

Mann's Patent Steam Cart and Wagon Company manufactured steam powered road vehicles in Leeds, England.

== History ==
=== Early history ===
The company was founded by James Hutchinson Mann, a native of Leeds. Mann had been apprenticed to J&H McLaren & Co. and also worked for Marshall, Sons & Co. of Gainsborough. In January 1894 he commenced a partnership with Sidney Charlesworth under the title Mann and Charlesworth, and their works was in Canning Street, off Dewsbury Road, Leeds. This company manufactured traction engines, portable engines and steam rollers. They also did conversions on engines from simple to compound operation, and made boilers.

One of their notable inventions was the single-eccentric reversing gear. This compact device allowed the sequence of valve opening of a steam engine to be changed, both in terms of "cut-off" and "direction" without the need for link motion and all the associated levers. Around 1898 Mann and Charlesworth produced, on behalf of Philip Parmiter of Tisbury, an agricultural steam cart using the front end of a conventional traction engine and a roller at the rear. This was one of the first practical self-powered load-carrying road vehicles. Mann realised the potential for this machine and went on to develop it into his "Patent Steam Cart" – to which the company title referred.

=== Pepper Road ===
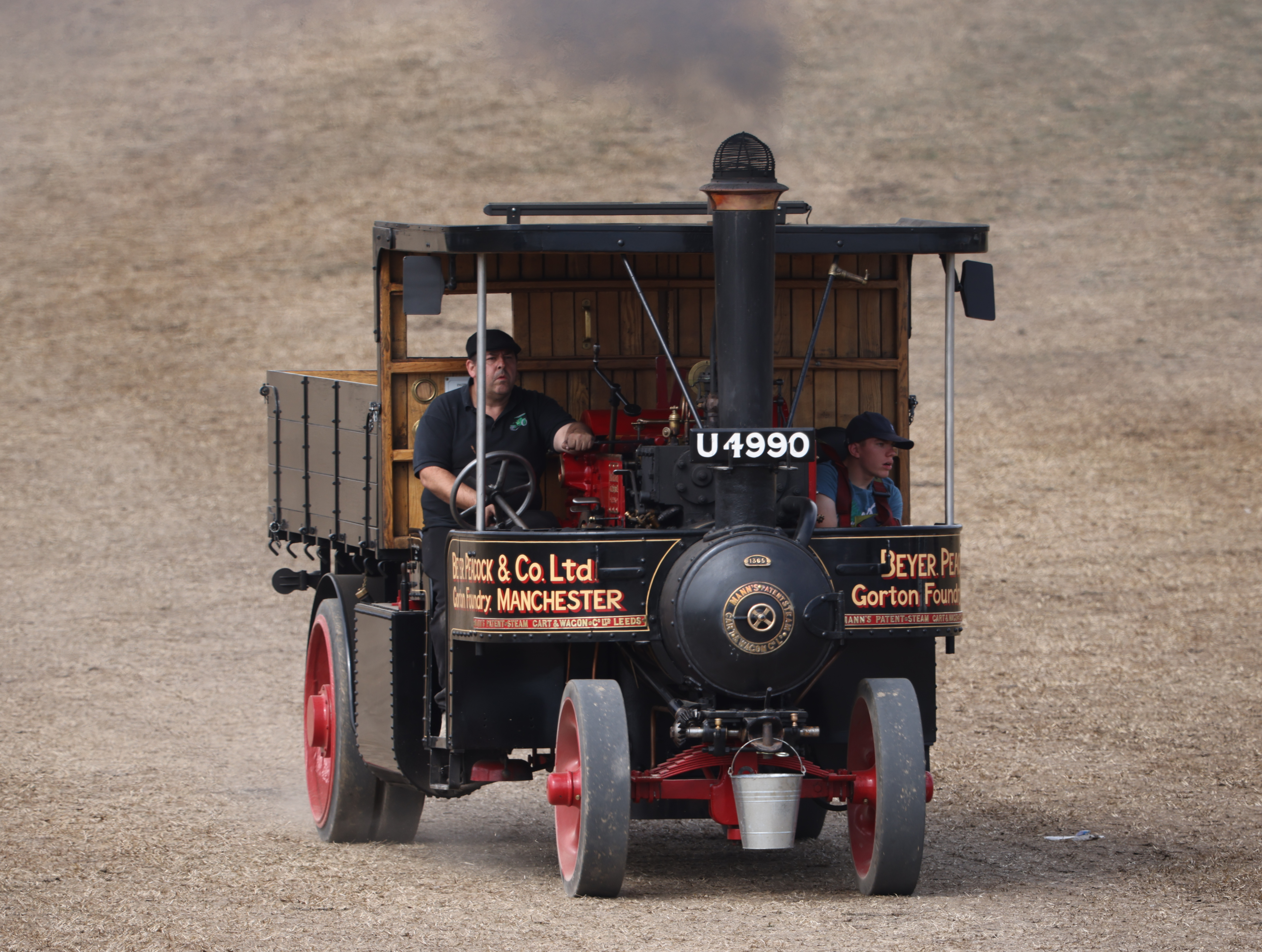
A 1919 Mann 4NHP steam wagon

Charlesworth left the partnership in 1898 and by September 1899 the organisation called Mann's Patent Steam Cart and Wagon Company was registered. The success of the patent cart was such that Mann decided to construct a new works on Pepper Road, Hunslet, Leeds and the move was complete by December 1901. The large, modern, well-equipped works was an ambitious move and was initially very successful. The period up to and including the First World War was the heyday of the company.

The company's main products were their 3-ton and 5-ton wagons, and these were produced in a whole range of variations, including Articulated 6-wheeler, Gully cleaning wagon, Brewers wagon, Bus bodied wagon, Municipal dustcart, Street watering wagon, Tar spraying wagon, Tipping wagon and many more. In addition the company produced a range of tractors for both road and agricultural use. Another popular product for municipal use was their lightweight patching roller, used for road repair. In 1924 the company introduced their superb Mann Express wagon, with shaft drive, high-speed engine and fully enclosed cab. Unfortunately this wagon was not a commercial success and by 1926 Mann's Patent Steam Cart and Wagon Company was in trouble. Despite attempts to provide additional finance it was not possible to save the company, and in 1929 the works closed completely.

=== Subsequent history ===
In February 1929 Mann's Patent Steam Car and Wagon Co Ltd was purchased by Atkinson Walker Wagons Limited, of Preston, who were also manufacturers of steam wagons, and in March 1929 the Pepper Road Works and the production equipment was auctioned off. Atkinson renamed the company Mann’s Steam & Motor Wagon Company. However Atkinson were in a poor financial position, and as a result they sold the Mann business in 1930 to Scammell and Nephew of Spitalfields, London E1. Scammell produced a few Mann wagons, largely from the spares they acquired.
