= Waterloo Manufacturing Company =

Canadian manufacturing company

- Formerly: Buehler, Booth & Co. (1850–59); Bricker & Co. (1859–88)
- Industry: Manufacturing
- Founded: 7 August 1888
- Headquarters: 505 Dotzert Court, Waterloo, Ontario
- Website: watmfg.com

The Waterloo Manufacturing Company, Limited is a Canadian manufacturing company that has existed since 1888. Originally the company was a farm engine builder based in Waterloo, Ontario, which built engines in sizes ranging from sixteen to thirty horsepower between 1880 and 1925.

Waterloo Manufacturing of Ontario is occasionally confused with the Waterloo Gasoline Engine Company, of Waterloo, Iowa, U.S., which was purchased by John Deere for its Waterloo Boy Tractor. No relationship between the companies exists.

== History ==
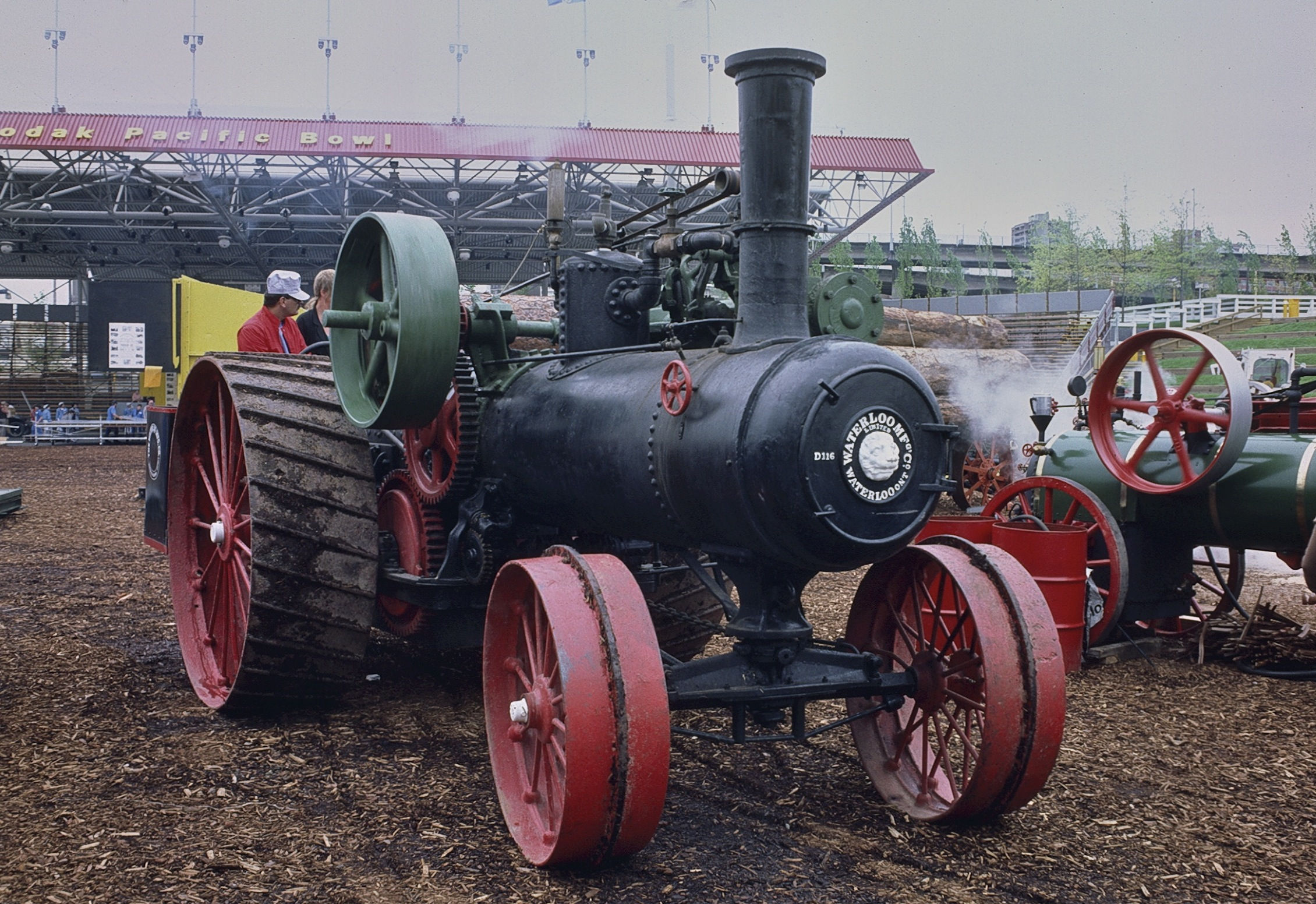
A Waterloo-built steam tractor being shown at Expo 86

In the 1920s and 30's Waterloo Mfg served as Canadian distributors for many U.S.-built brands including Hart Parr, Rock Island Heider, Rock Island, Belle City, Twin Cities, Minneapolis-Moline.

Waterloo Manufacturing continues to sell and service industrial boilers.
