= Wallis & Steevens =

Wallis and Steevens Ltd
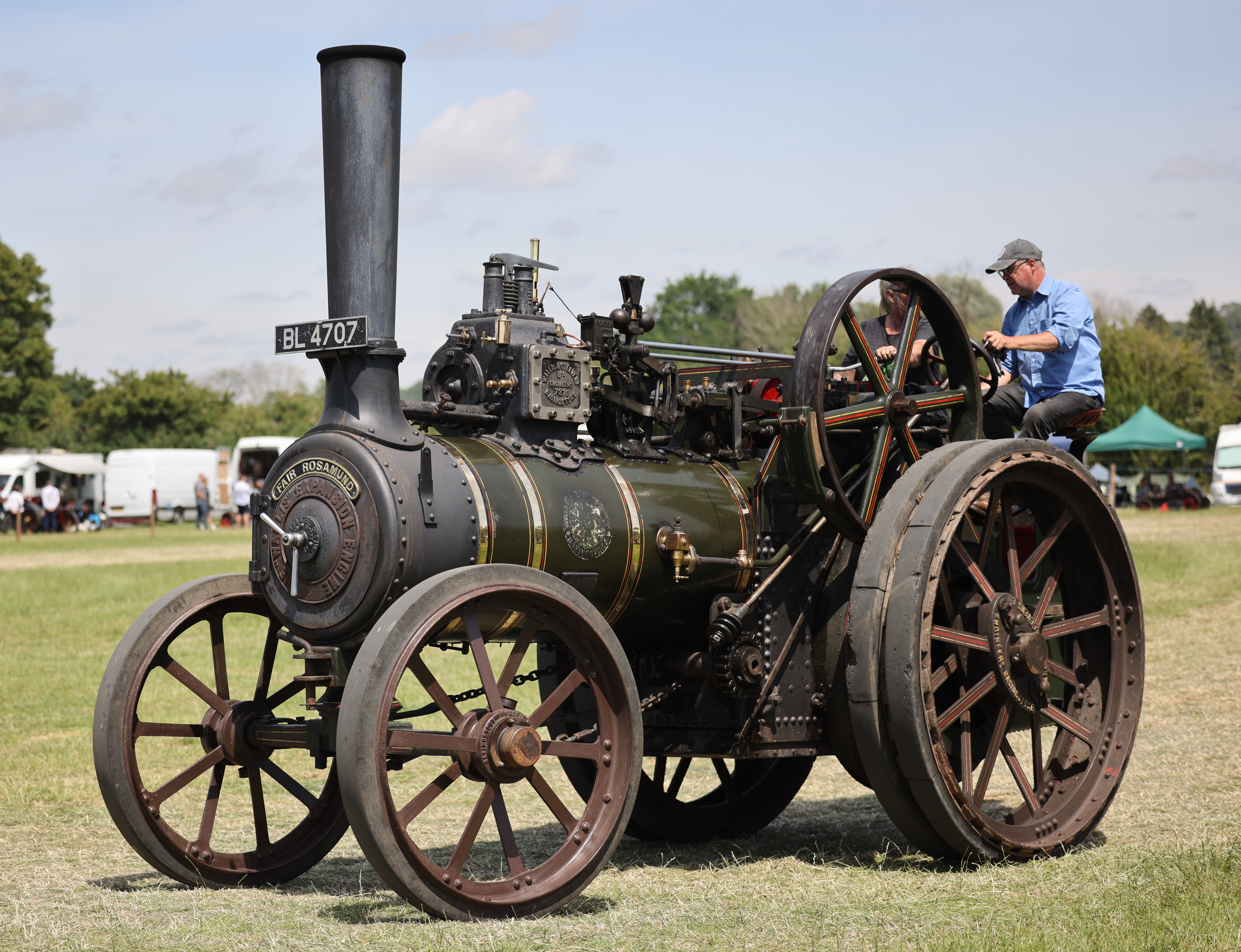
- 1914 built Wallis & Steevens 10 ton traction Engine Fair Rosamund
- Industry: Agricultural machinery
- Founded: 1856; 170 years ago in Basingstoke, England
- Founders: Charles Wallis; Charles Haslam
- Defunct: June 1981
- Fate: Wound up
- Successor: BSP International Foundations Ltd
- Headquarters: Basingstoke, England
- Products: Agricultural machinery; Steam road locomotives; IC vehicles

Wallis & Steevens of Basingstoke, Hampshire, England produced agricultural equipment, traction engines and steam and diesel road rollers.

== History ==
The company was founded in 1856 by Arthur Wallis and Charles Haslam in newly built premises which they named The North Hants Ironworks. The works were sited on Station Hill in Basingstoke and the company began trading as Wallis & Haslam. Shortly afterwards the company was highly commended for its hand-worked bench drilling machine at the 1857 Royal Agricultural show in Salisbury. Even at this early stage, the company was producing a wide variety of agricultural equipment, and alongside the bench drill were corn drills, turnip drills, four types of horse hoe, drag harrows, a 3 hp threshing machine, a barley hummeller and sundry other devices. In 1862 a third partner, Charles James Steevens, joined the company and when Charles Haslam retired in 1869 the company became Wallis & Steevens. The date of production for the company's first Portable steam engine is not known although the earliest surviving drawing is dated 1866. The first traction engine, an 8 hp single, was built in 1877 from drawings by Arthur Herbert Wallis (son of the company founder) and this vehicle made its trial run on 21 June that year. The vehicle, named Success on the strength of its performance during the test, was given the works number T250.

Manufacture of steam vehicles gradually gave way to internal combustion models from the 1930s and production continued at the Station Hill premises until its enforced closure with the redevelopment of Basingstoke town centre during 1966/67. Production was then transferred to a site at Daneshill where the company enjoyed a brief resurgence before the general trading recession of 1980/81. In May 1981 agreement was reached with BSP International Foundations Ltd of Ipswich to "take over the designs and copyrights of the current production models, together with spares, components and goodwill, and for the business to be transferred to the BSP works at Claydon". The transfer was completed by July 1981 and at that point Wallis & Steevens ceased to trade.

== Preservation ==
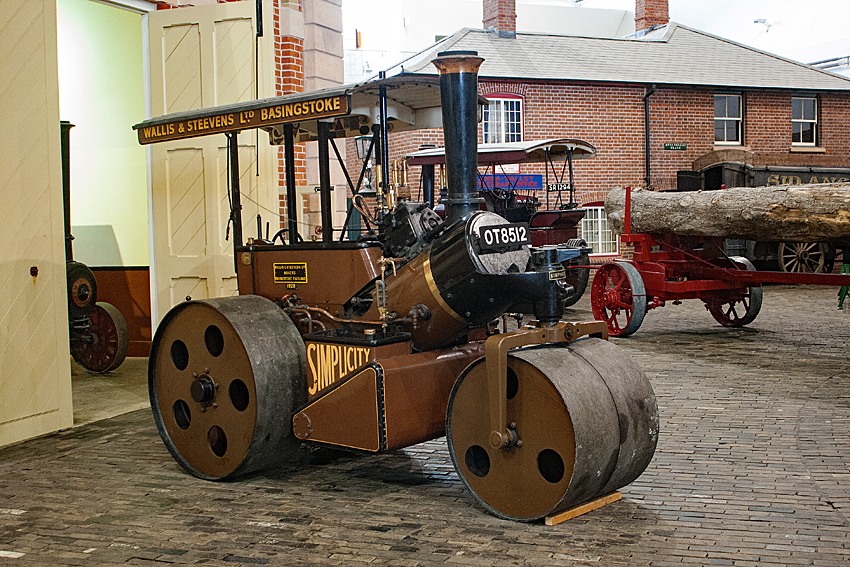
Simplicity steam roller at Milestones museum

Four Wallis & Steevens vehicles, including an example of the unusual Simplicity steamroller with its steeply inclined boiler, can be seen at the Milestones Museum in Basingstoke. More than 180 engines, mostly privately owned, have survived. A full size reproduction of a Wallis & Steevens 3 ton tractor was constructed in the first half of the 1980s.
