= Keck-Gonnerman Co. =

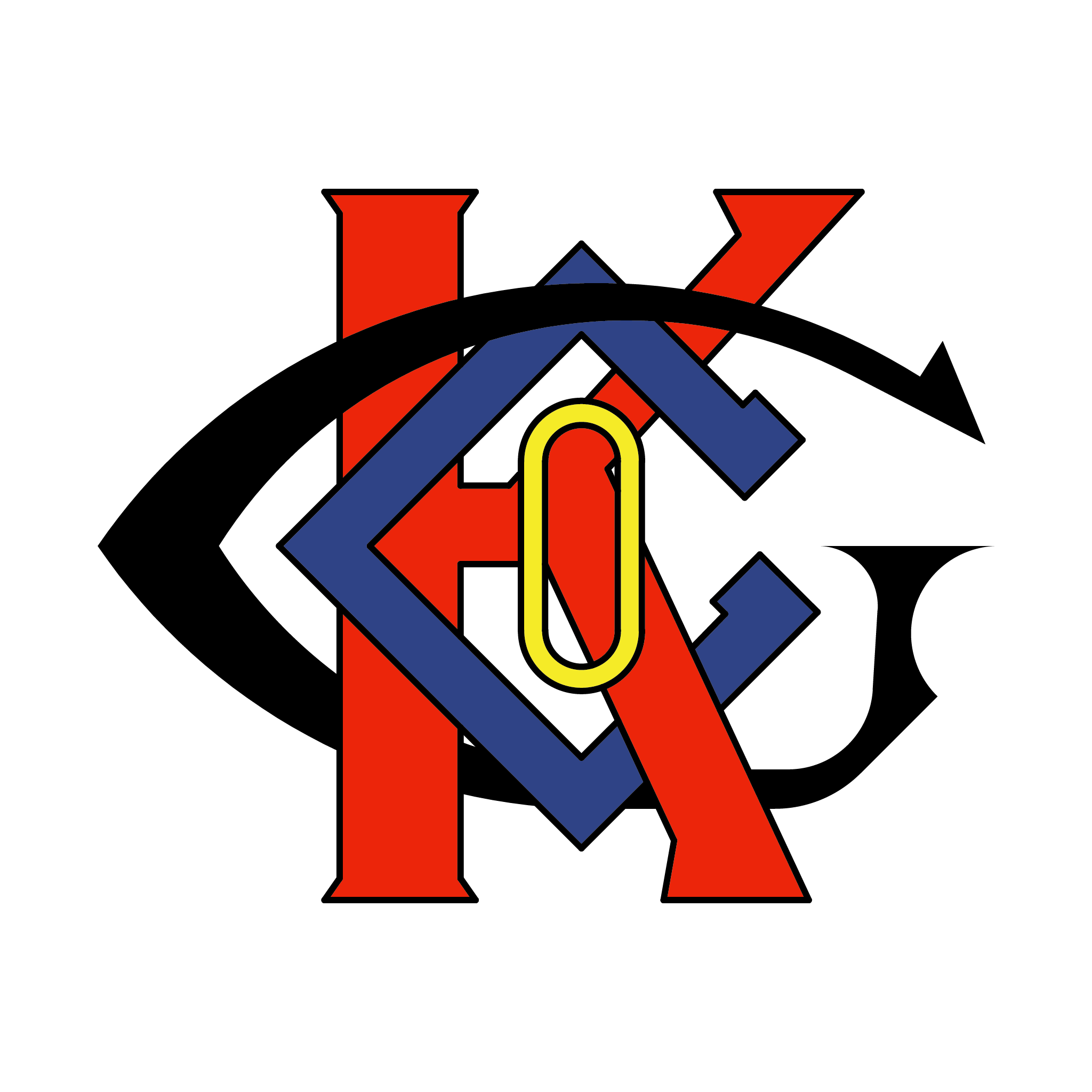
- Company type: Private
- Industry: Agricultural Machinery
- Predecessors: Woody & Keck, Keck & Onk, Keck, Gonnerman & Company
- Incorporated: 1901
- Founders: John Keck, William Gonnerman
- Defunct: 1953
- Headquarters: Mount Vernon, Indiana, U.S.
- Area served: United States, Canada, Cuba
- Products: Steam Traction Engines, Threshing Machines, Kerosine and Gasoline Tractors

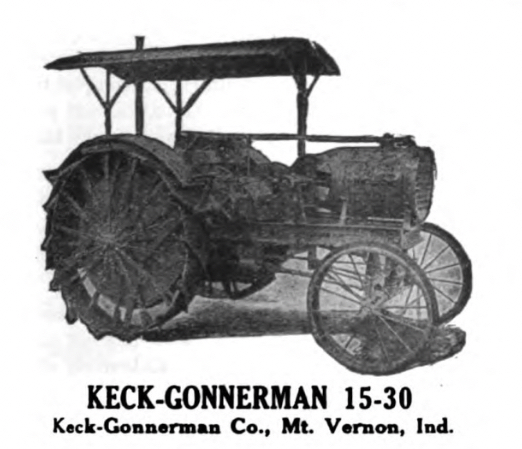
Keck-Gonnerman 15-30 (1920–1927)

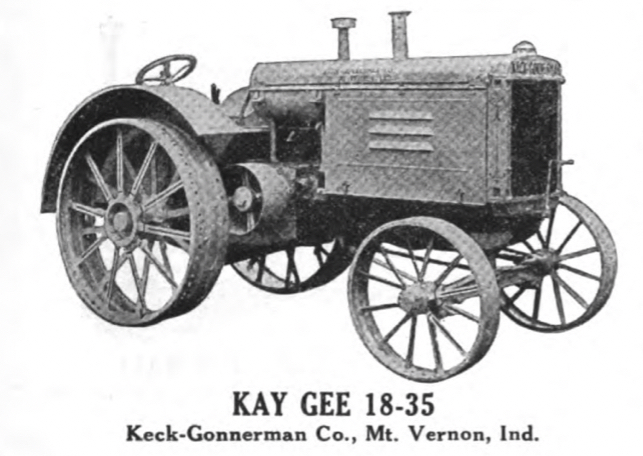
Kay Gee 18-35 (1928–1931)

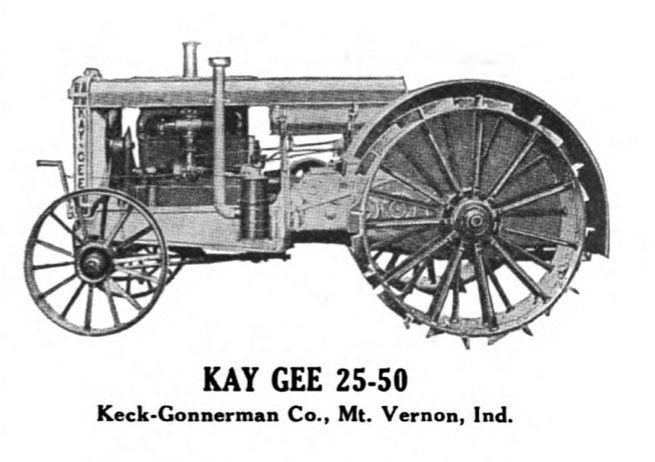
Kay Gee 25-50 (1928–1931))

The Keck-Gonnerman Company was an American manufacturer of steam traction engines, threshing machines, kerosene and gasoline tractors, and other agricultural and industrial equipment based in Mt. Vernon, Indiana. Founded in the late 19th century and incorporated in 1901, the company grew into one of the largest industrial manufacturers in southern Indiana before closing in the mid-20th century.

== History ==
The firm was established in 1873 by John and Winfield Woody, originating as a foundry. In 1877, after the death of Winfield, John Keck, a German immigrant and John Woody's brother-in-law, purchased Winfield's shares in the firm, and it was renamed Woody & Keck.

Three years later, in 1880, John Woody retired due to illness, leaving John Keck to manage the firm. In 1883, John Onk bought Woody's share in the firm, and it was again renamed to Keck & Onk.

Onk's involvement was short-lived, however; upon his departure back to his home in Louisville, KY, William Gonnerman, also a German immigrant and a mechanical engineer of Purdue University, and Henry Kuebler joined the firm with ⅓ share each. The firm was renamed Keck, Gonnerman & Company. In 1884, the firm began production of engines, threshing machines, and portable sawmills.

Louis Keck (John Keck's brother) purchased Kuebler's share in the firm in 1885, and in 1901, the business was incorporated as the Keck-Gonnerman Company. In 1904, coal mining equipment was added to the product line.

The Keck-Gonnerman Co. began production of gasoline tractors in 1917. In 1921, the company opened a branch in St. Louis, MO. As of 1926, they also had a branch in Peoria, IL (date opened unknown).

== Products ==
Steam Traction Engines
Product Code	Drawbar HP	Belt HP	Gearing	Cylinders	Years Produced
Abroad	10		Side	1	
Abrupt	13		Side	1	
Abscind	15		Side	1	
Absinth	15		Side	2	
Abscold	18		Side	1	
Abscold	19		Side	1	1921-1930
Abust	18		Rear	1	
Abust	19		Rear	1	1921-1930
Abstock	18		Rear	2	
Abstock	19		Rear	2	1921-1930
Absorb	20		Side	1	
Absorb	22		Side	1	1921-1930
Abert	20		Rear	1	
Abert	22		Rear	1	1921-1930
Abstore	20		Side	2	
Abstrawn	20		Rear	2	
Abstrawn	22		Rear	2	1921-1930
Absum	25		Rear	1	
Abstruse	25		Rear	2	

Tractors
Product Code	Size / Model	Drawbar HP	Belt HP	Years Produced	Fuel	Weight
	12-24	12	24	1917 - 1920		
Advance	15-30 Model C	15	30	1920 - 1927	Kerosene	6,500 lbs
Alamo	18-35	18	35	1928 - 1935	Kerosene	6,500 lbs?
	18-35 ZW	18	35	1935 - 1937		5,200 lbs
Alidade	25-50	25	50	1928 - 1930		9,800 lbs
Allbearing	30-60	30	60	1928 - 1937		10,000 lbs
