= Steamroller =

Steam powered road roller

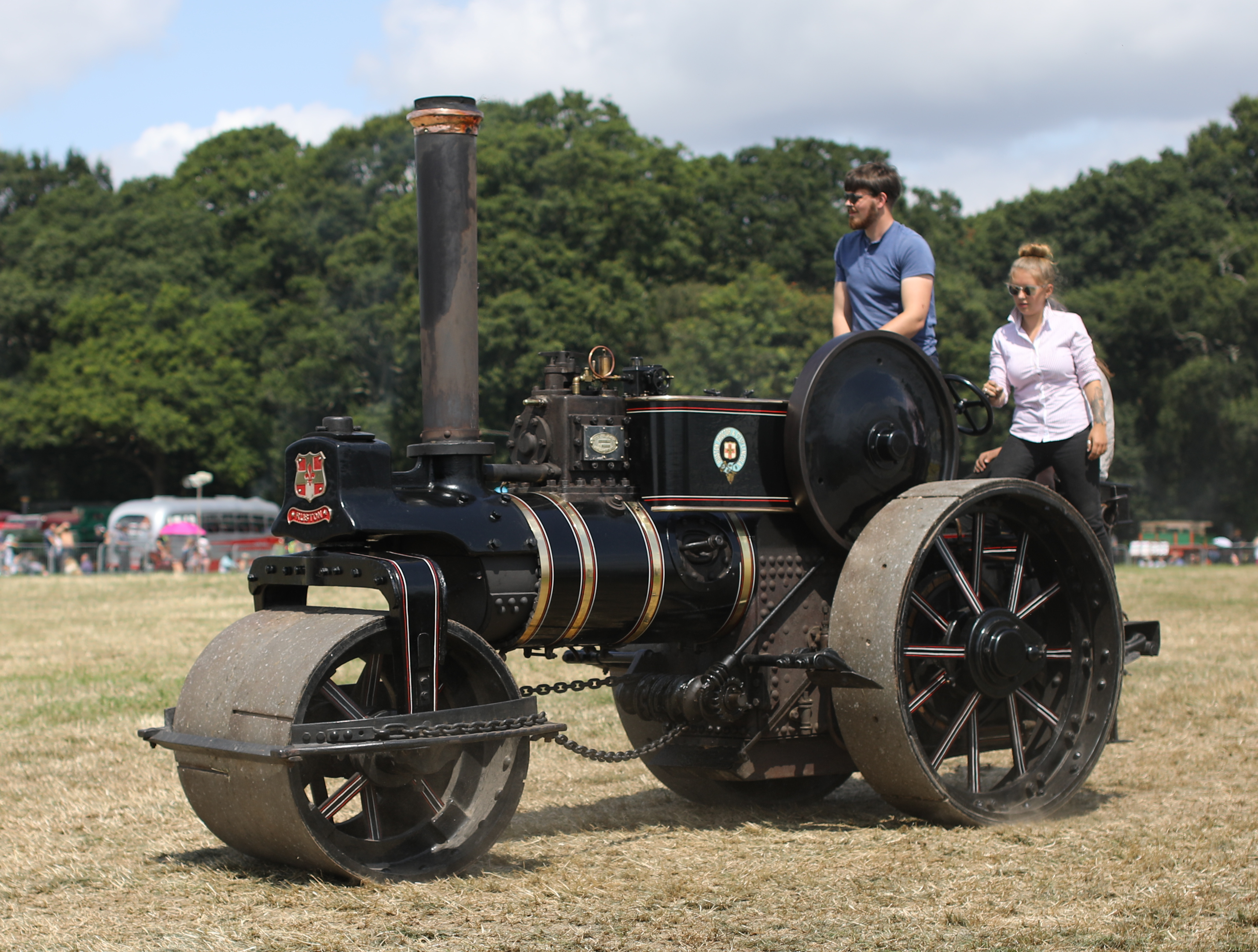
Ruston Proctor steamroller (road roller)

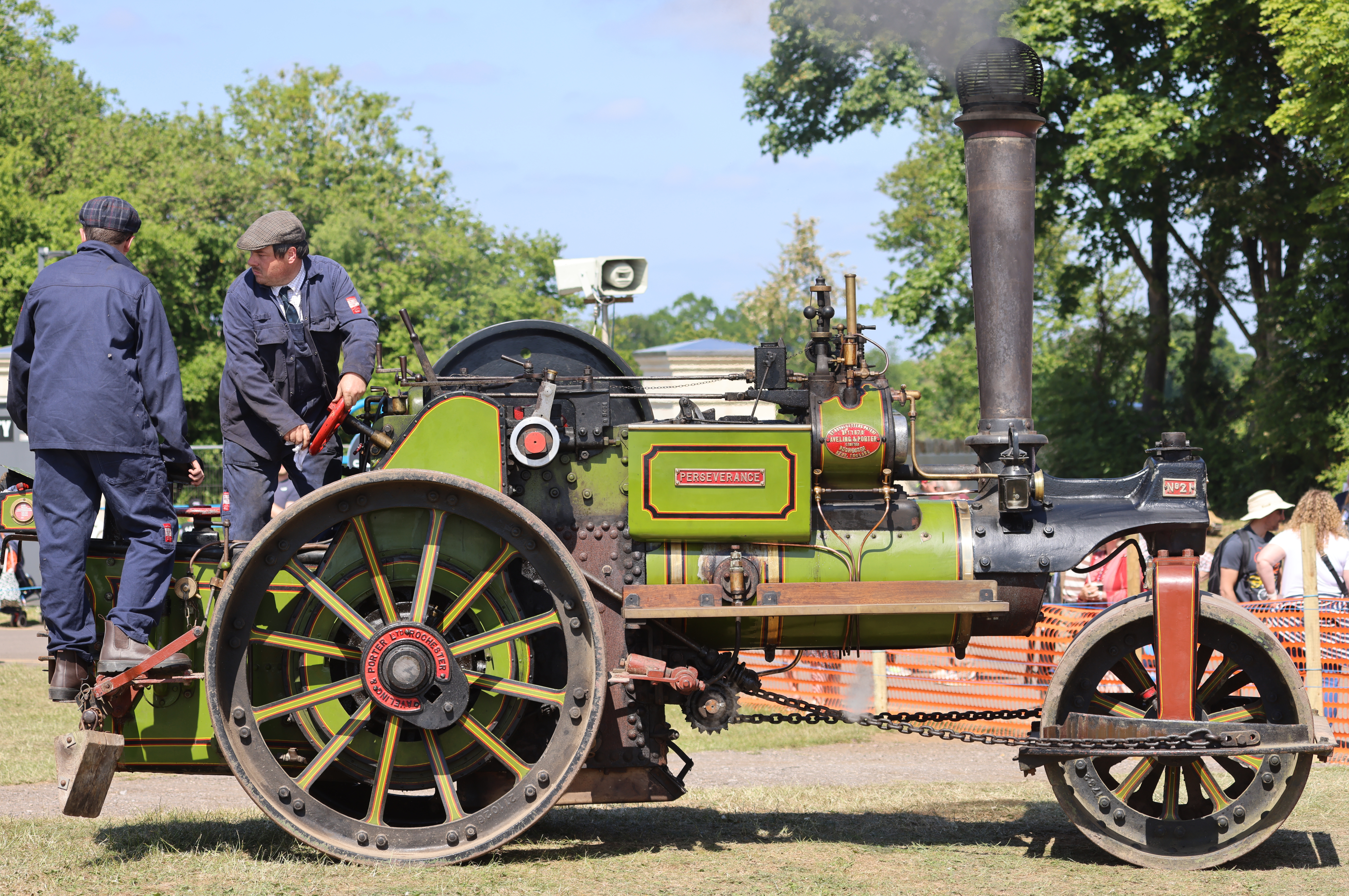
Steamroller by Aveling and Porter

A steamroller (or steam roller) is a form of road roller – a type of heavy construction machinery used for leveling surfaces, such as roads or airfields – that is powered by a steam engine. The leveling/flattening action is achieved through a combination of the size and weight of the vehicle and the rolls: the smooth wheels and the large cylinder or drum fitted in place of treaded road wheels.

The majority of steam rollers are outwardly similar to traction engines as many traction engine manufacturers later produced rollers based on their existing designs, and the patents owned by certain roller manufacturers tended to influence the general arrangements used by others. The key difference between the two vehicles is that on a roller the main roll replaces the front wheels and axle that would be fitted to a traction engine, and the driving wheels are smooth-tired.

The word steamroller frequently refers to road rollers in general, regardless of the method of propulsion.

== History ==
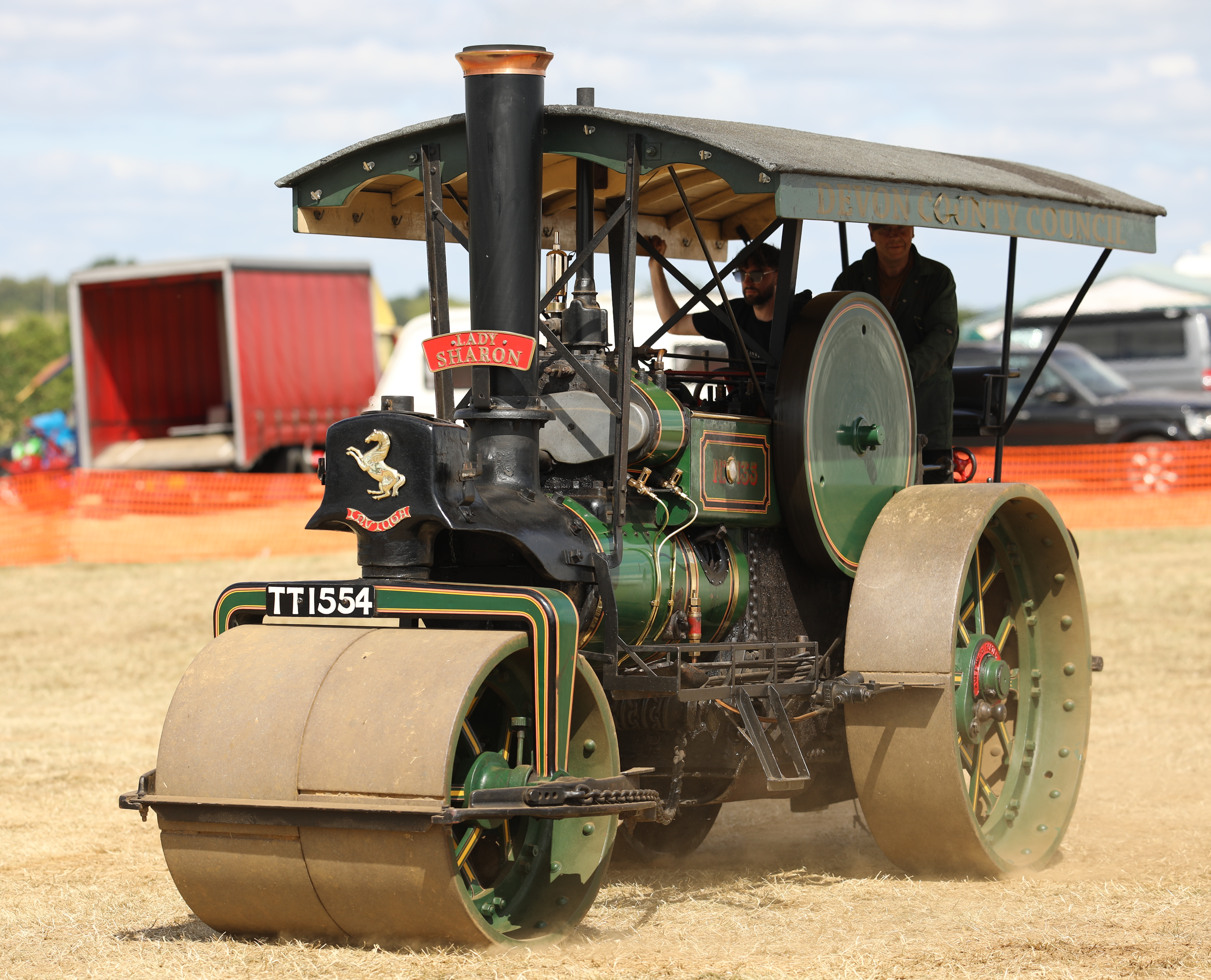
Aveling and Porter manufactured the first successful steamrollers. Pictured is an example from 1924

Before about 1850, the word steamroller meant a fixed machine for rolling and curving steel plates for boilers and ships. From then on, it also meant a mobile device for flattening ground. An early steamroller was patented by Louis Lemoine in France in 1859 and demonstrated sometime before February 1861. In Britain, a 30-ton steamroller was designed in 1863 by William Clark and partner W.F. Batho. Having failed to impress the British municipal road authorities, it was transferred to Kolkata, where it continued to work.

The company Aveling and Porter was the first to successfully sell the product commercially and subsequently became the largest manufacturer in Britain. In 1866 they produced a prototype roller with 3-foot-wide (90 cm) rollers fitted to the rear of a standard 12-nominal-horsepower traction engine. This experimental machine was described by local papers as 'the world's first steamroller' and it caused a public spectacle.

In 1867, the steam road roller was patented and the company began production of the first practical steam roller – the new machine's rollers were mounted at the front instead of the back and it weighed in excess of 30 tons. It was tested on the Military Road in Chatham, Star Hill in Rochester and in Hyde Park, London, and the machine proved a huge success. Within a year, they were being exported around the world, including to France, India and the United States. A New York City chief engineer said of one of these, that "in one day's rolling at a cost of 10 dollars, as much work was accomplished as in two days' rolling with a 7 ton roller drawn by eight horses at a cost of 20 dollars a day." The heavier rollers were found to be hard to handle, and the weight of the machines was reduced to around 10 tons.

Aveling and Porter refined their product continuously over the following decades, introducing fully steerable front rollers and compound steam engines at the 1881 Royal Agricultural Show. The move to asphalt for road construction resulted in the demand for steamrollers that could rapidly reverse so they could roll the tar while still hot. Machines that could do this were introduced in the first decade of the 20th century.

Production ended around 1950.

== Configurations ==
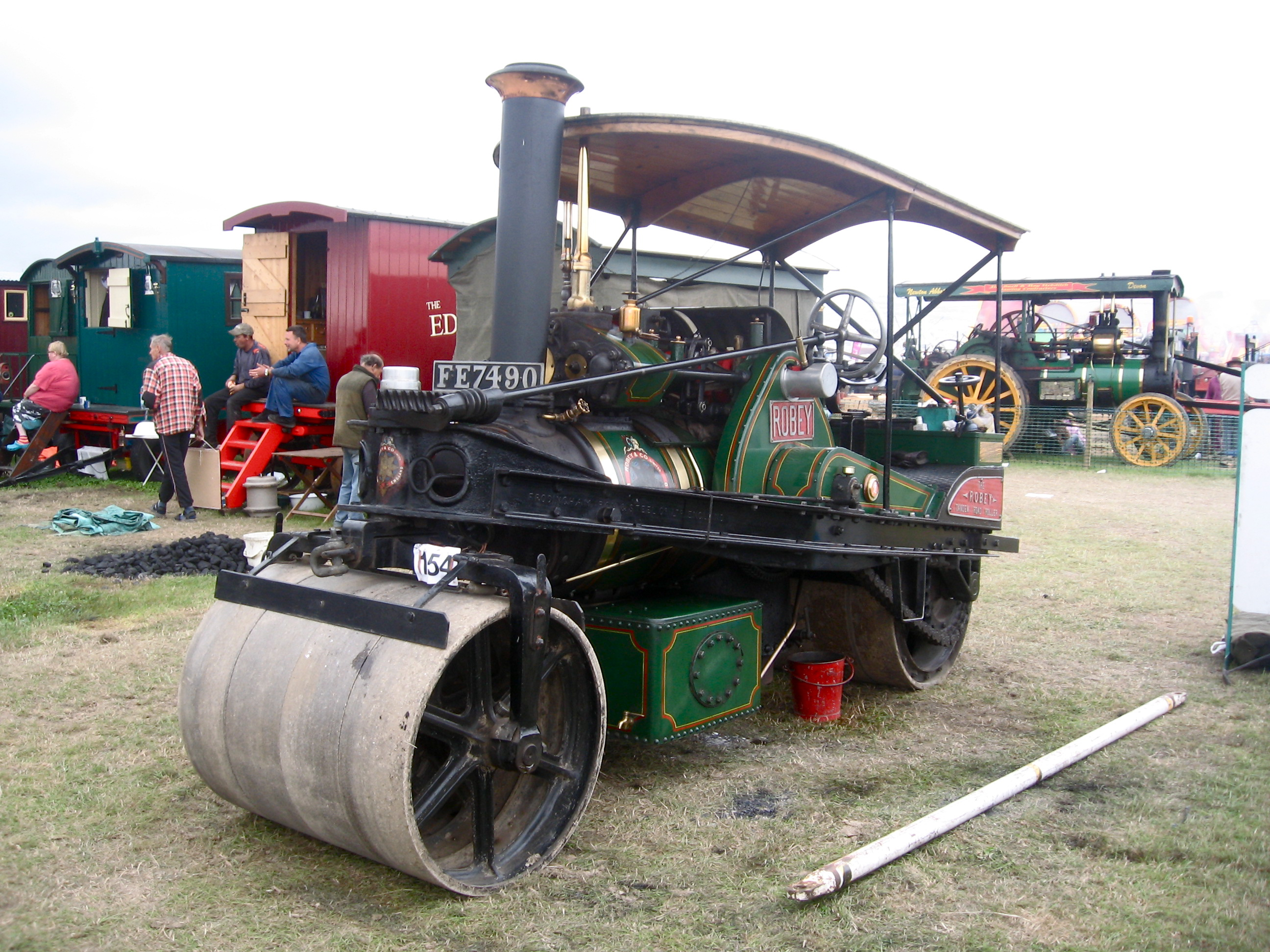
1925 Robey tandem roller #42693, now owned by the Robey Trust

The majority of rollers were of the same basic 3-roll configuration, gear-driven, with two large smooth wheels (rolls) at the back and a single wide roll at the front (in actuality, the wide roll usually consisted of two narrower rolls on the same axle, to make steering easier). However, there was also a distinctive variant, the "tandem", which had two wide rolls, one front, one rear. They were better for rolling asphalt which drove demand from the 1920s. Those made by Robey & Co used their standard steam wagon engine and pistol boiler fitted in a girder frame with rolls and a chain drive to produce a quick-reversing roller suitable for modern road surfaces such as tarmacadam and bituminous asphalt. A number of Robey & Co. tandem rollers were modified to make a further variant, the tri-tandem, which was a tandem with a third roll, mounted directly behind the rear one. Robey supplied the parts, but the modification was undertaken by Goodes of Royston. Ten tandem and two tri-tandem Robey rollers survive in preservation, and one of the tri-tandems is known to have been used to construct parts of the M1 motorway.

A variation of the basic configuration was the "convertible": an engine which could be either a steam roller or a traction engine and could be changed from one form to the other in a relatively short time – i.e., less than half a day. Convertible engines were liked by local authorities, since the same machine could be used for haulage in the winter and road-mending in the summer.

A rare type with only four built were embankment rollers with twin wheels at both the front and back rather than a single roller at the front. They were used in the construction of reservoirs.

== Design features ==
Although most steam roller designs are derived from traction engines, and were manufactured by the same companies, there are a number of features that set them apart.

=== Wheels ===
The most obvious difference is in the wheels. Traction engines were generally built with large fabricated spoked steel wheels with wide rims. Those intended for road use would have continuous solid rubber tyres bolted around the rims, to improve traction on tarmac. Engines intended for agricultural use would have a series of strakes bolted diagonally across the rims, like the tread on a modern pneumatic tractor tyre, and the wheels were typically wider to spread the load more evenly.

Steam rollers, on the other hand, had smooth rear wheels and a roller at the front. The roller consisted of a pair of adjacent wide cylinders supported at both ends. This replaced the separate wheels and axle of a traction engine.

=== Smokebox ===
In the conventional arrangement, the front roller is mounted centrally, forward of the chimney. In order to allow enough clearance from the boiler (and hence a larger front roll), the smokebox is extended forward substantially at the top to incorporate a support plate on which to mount the bearing for the roller assembly. This gives the distinctive, hooded look to the front of a steam roller. It also necessitates a different design of smokebox door – it has to hinge up or down, rather than opening sideways, due to the limited access available. Access to the boiler tubes for cleaning is limited and the brush usually has to be inserted through the small gap between the top of the roll and the fork.

=== Special equipment ===
The front and rear rolls were usually fitted with scraper bars. As the vehicle moved along, these removed any surface material that had become stuck to the roll, to prevent a build-up of material and ensure a flat finish was maintained.

Some steam rollers were fitted with a scarifier mounted on the tender box at the rear. They could be swung down to road level and used to rip up the old surface before a road was remade.

Another accessory was a tar sprayer – a bar mounted on the back of the roller. This was not a common fixture.

== Manufacturers ==
Britain was a major exporter of steam rollers over the years, with the firm of Aveling and Porter probably being the most famous and the most prolific.

Many other traction engine manufacturers built steam rollers, but after Aveling and Porter, the most popular were Marshall, Sons & Co., John Fowler & Co., and Wallis & Steevens.

In America, the Buffalo-Springfield Roller Company was a large builder. J. I. Case made a roller variant of their farm engines, but had a small market share. Other nations had makers including the Czechs, Swiss, Swedes, Germans (notably Kemna) and Dutch which produced steam rollers.

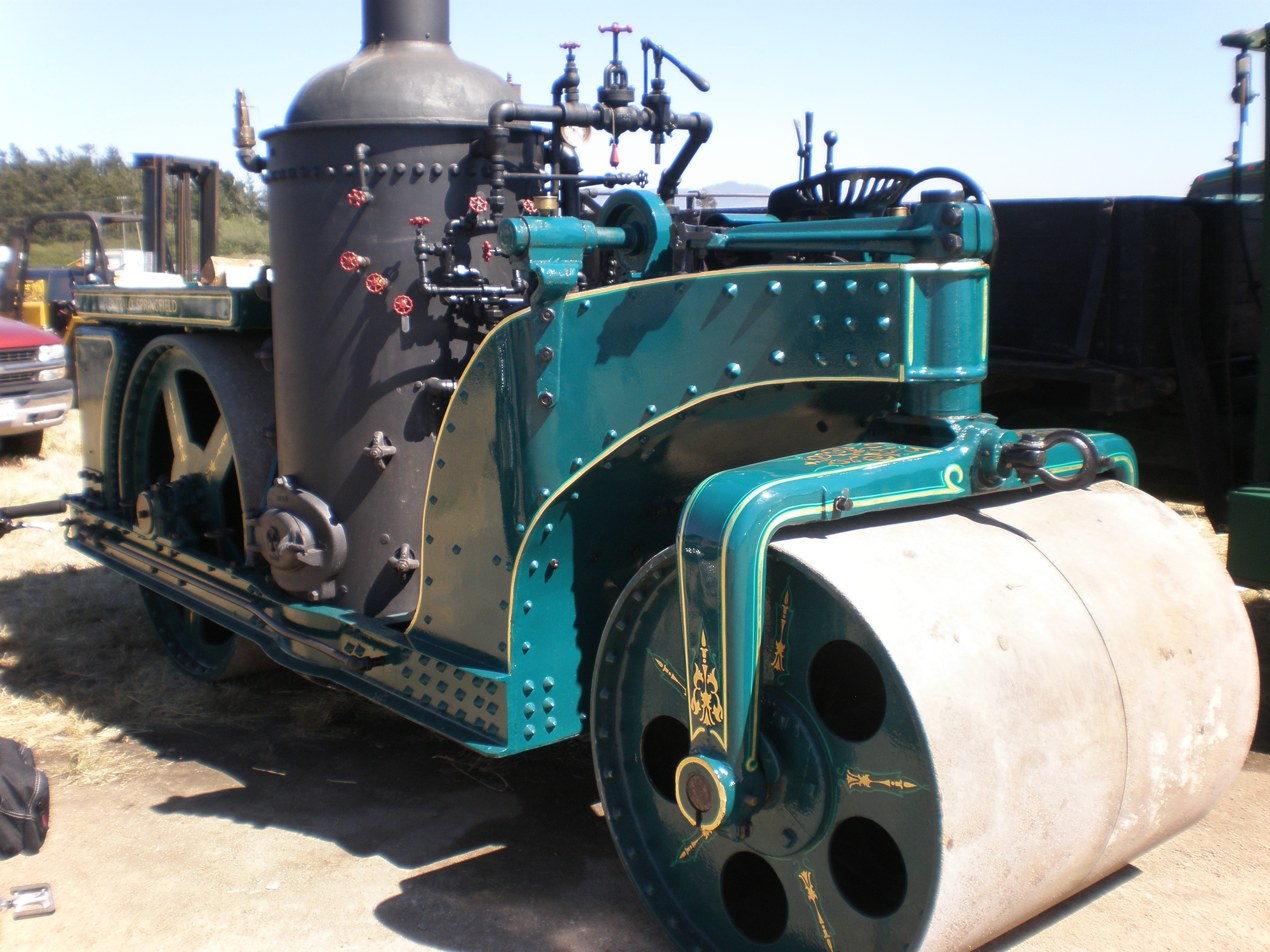
United States-built 1924 Buffalo Springfield steam roller: a vertical boiler design with tandem rolls. Note position of firebox door, facing out of frames.

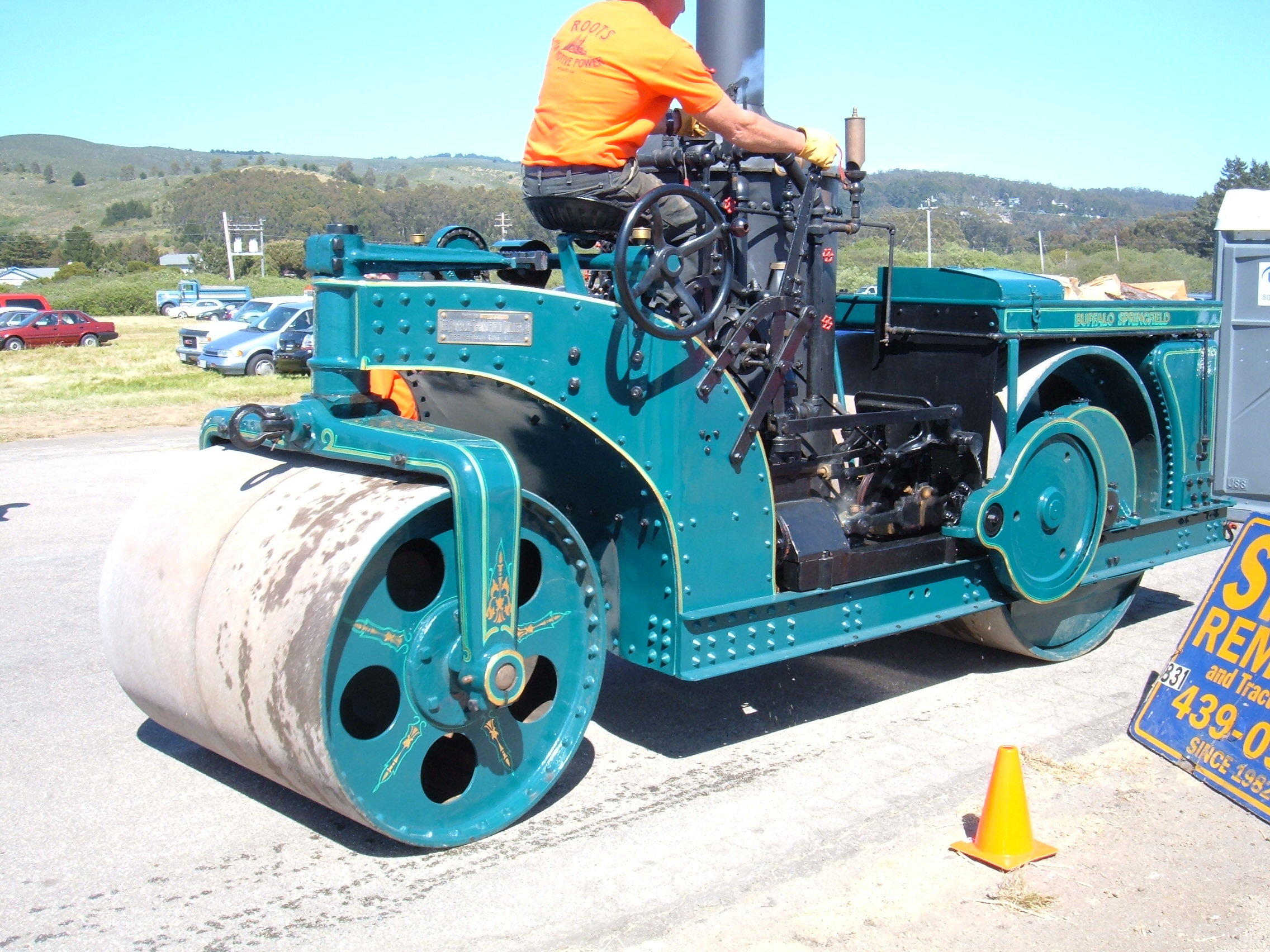
Other side of same roller showing offset driving position: driver faces boiler controls (i.e. 'backwards') and steers with right hand

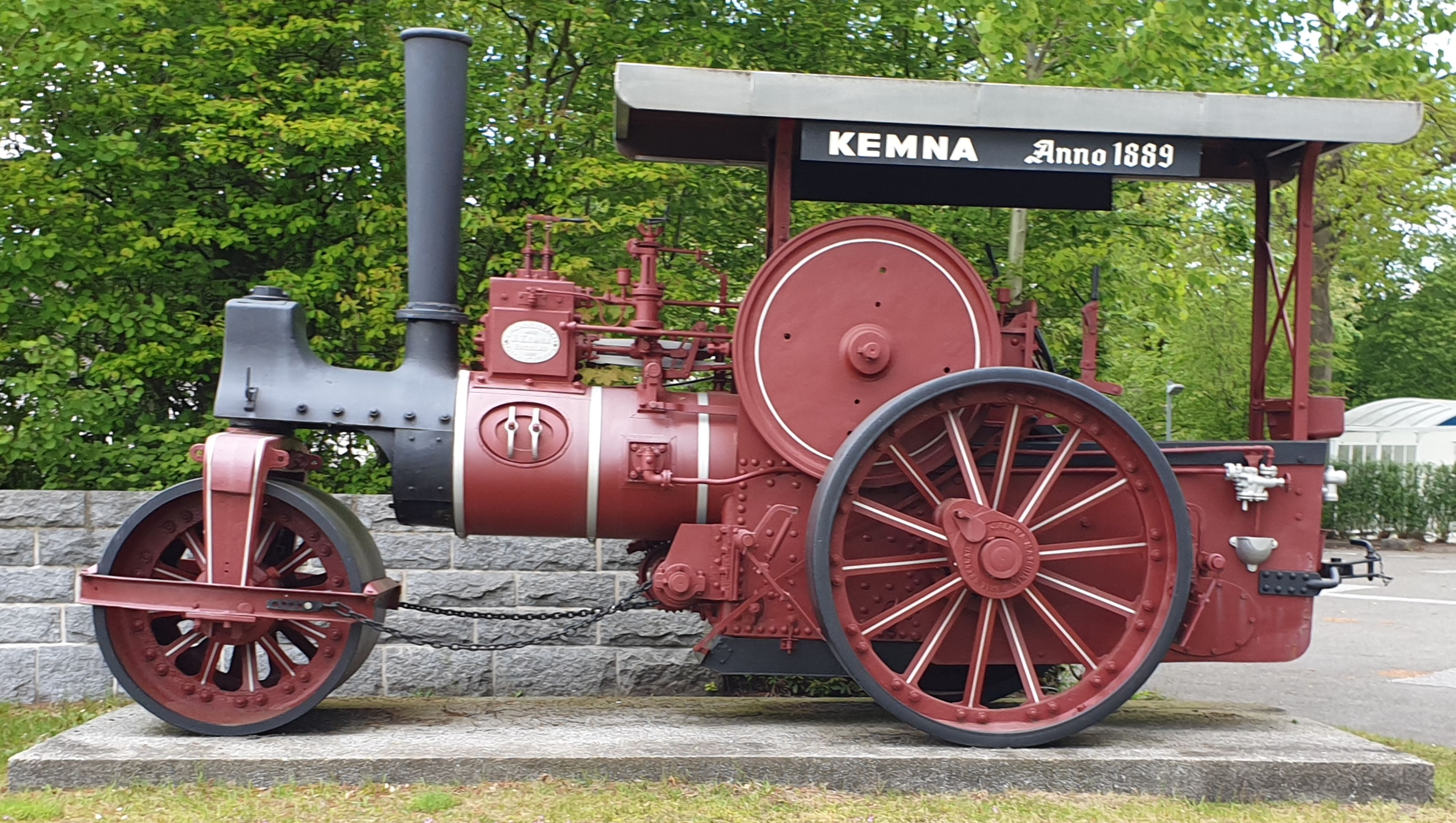
An early "Kemna" Steamroller

== Usage ==
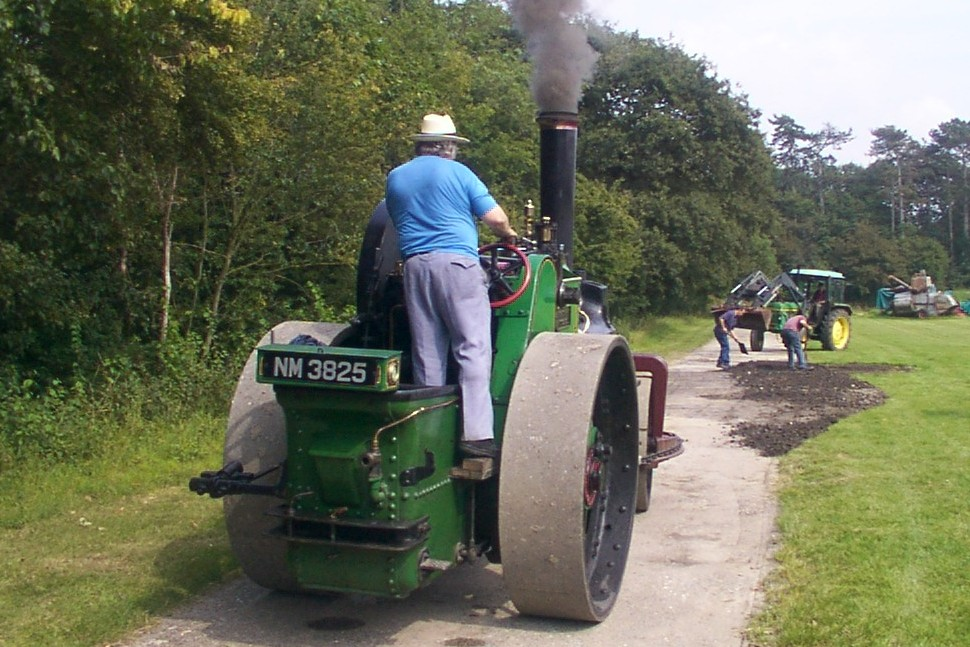
A former Bedfordshire County Council Aveling & Porter roller in 2004

In the UK, a number of companies owned fleets of steam rollers and contracted them out to local authorities. Many were still in use into the 1960s, and part of the M1 motorway was made using steam rollers. A few steam rollers were being used for road maintenance in the early 1970s, and this may go some way to explaining why diesel-powered rollers are still colloquially known as steam rollers today.

=== Preservation ===
A road-making demonstration at Great Dorset Steam fair

Many steam rollers are preserved in working order, and can be seen in operation during special live steam festivals, where operating scale models may also be displayed. At some of the UK steam fairs and rallies, demonstrations of road building using the old techniques, tools and machines are re-enacted by 'Road Gangs' in authentic dress. Steam rollers feature prominently in these demonstrations. The annual Great Dorset Steam Fair has a section dedicated to road-making machinery, including a line-up of working steam rollers.

A number of steamrollers ended their working lives in children's playgrounds to provide something for children to play on.

== Popular culture ==
Two popular American bands were named after steamrollers, Buffalo Springfield and Mannheim Steamroller. Parni Valjak (trans. Steamroller) is the name of the popular Croatian and Yugoslav rock band, and the group has used the name Steam Roller on their English language releases.

Two different steamrollers appear as prominent characters in the Thomas & Friends television series; George and Buster, both of whom are based on the Aveling-Barford R class design.

British steeplejack and engineering enthusiast Fred Dibnah was known as a national institution in Great Britain for the conservation of steam rollers and traction engines. The first engine he restored to working order was an Aveling & Porter steam roller, registration no. DM3079. Built in 1912, it was a 10-ton slide-valve, single-cylinder, 4-shaft, road roller. Originally named "Allison", after his first wife, Fred renamed the engine "Betsy" (his mother's name) following his divorce – Fred's view being "wives may change but your mother remains your mother!" This roller was featured in many of Fred's early television programmes. It may still be seen at steam rallies in Britain and was in steam at the Great Dorset Steam Fair in 2011.

Author Terry Pratchett instructed his collaborator Neil Gaiman that anything Pratchett had been working on at the time of his death should be destroyed by a steamroller. Pratchett's daughter and literary executor Rhianna Pratchett also stated that she had no desire to try to finish her father's work or continue the Discworld franchise without him. Accordingly, Pratchett's assistant Rob Wilkins brought Pratchett's computer hard drive to the Great Dorset Steam Fair, where a steamroller was driven over it.

== As a symbol ==
The steamroller has a strong symbolism of an irresistible, onward-pushing force. The Imperial Russian Army was nicknamed "steamroller" during World War One, as it was huge in size, and Russia initiated the war with an offensive. The "Russian Steamroller" is one of the personifications of Russia, along with the Russian bear, double-headed eagle and Mat Zemlya.

== See also ==
- History of steam road vehicles
- Traction engine
- Roller (agricultural tool) – for farm rollers
- Roller (disambiguation) – for other types of roller
- List of steam energy topics
- Paddy's motorbike – nickname for another type of compaction vehicle.
- Thomas Green & Son builders of steam rollers, but better known for motor rollers.

== Bibliography ==
- Burton, Anthony (2000). Traction Engines: Two Centuries of Steam Power. Leicester: Silverdale Books. ISBN 1-85605-533-7.
- Ranieri, Malcolm (2005). Traction Engine Album. Ramsbury: Crowood Press. ISBN 1-86126-794-0.
