= Steam tractor =

Vehicle powered by a steam engine

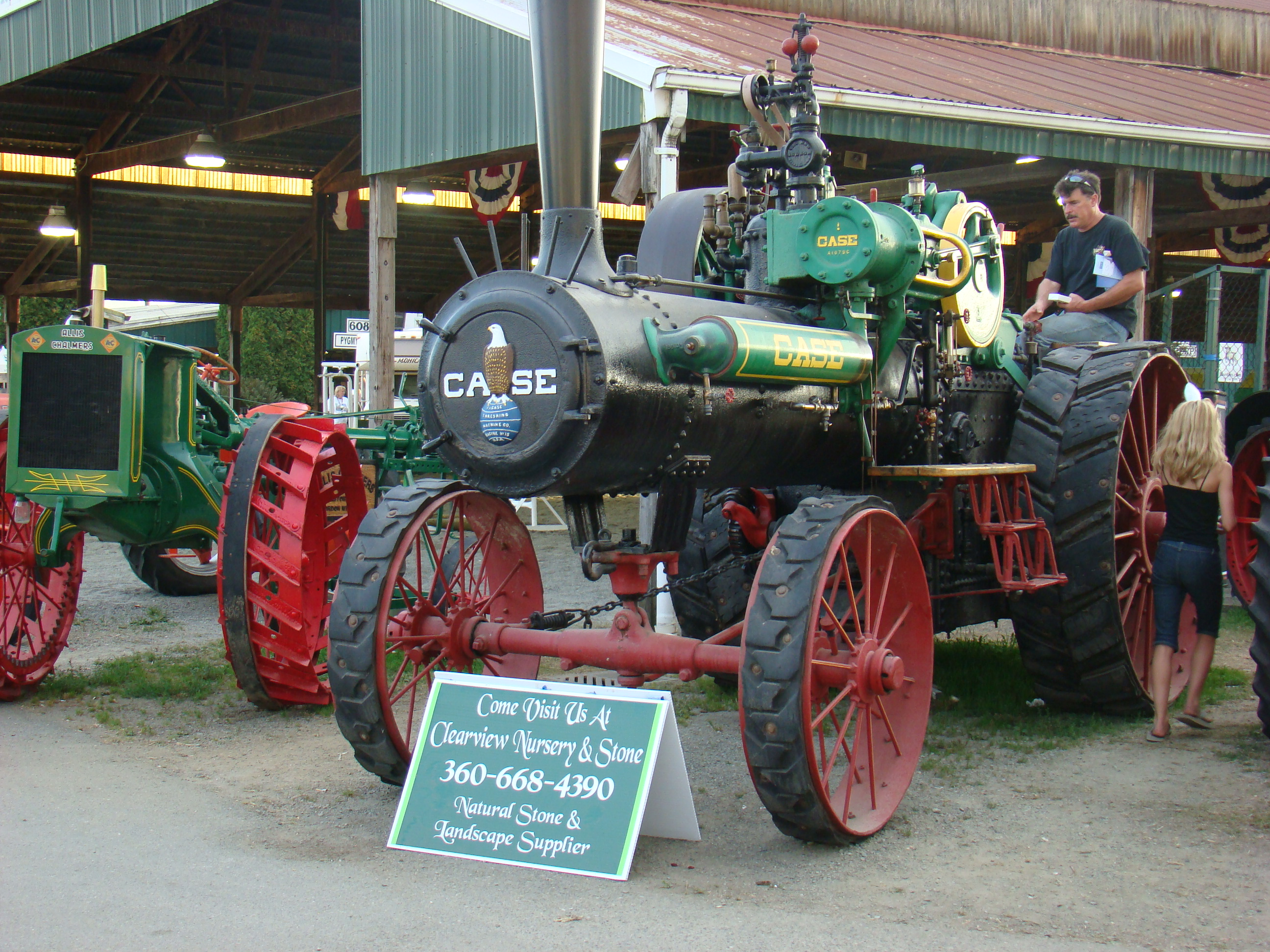
Case steam tractor

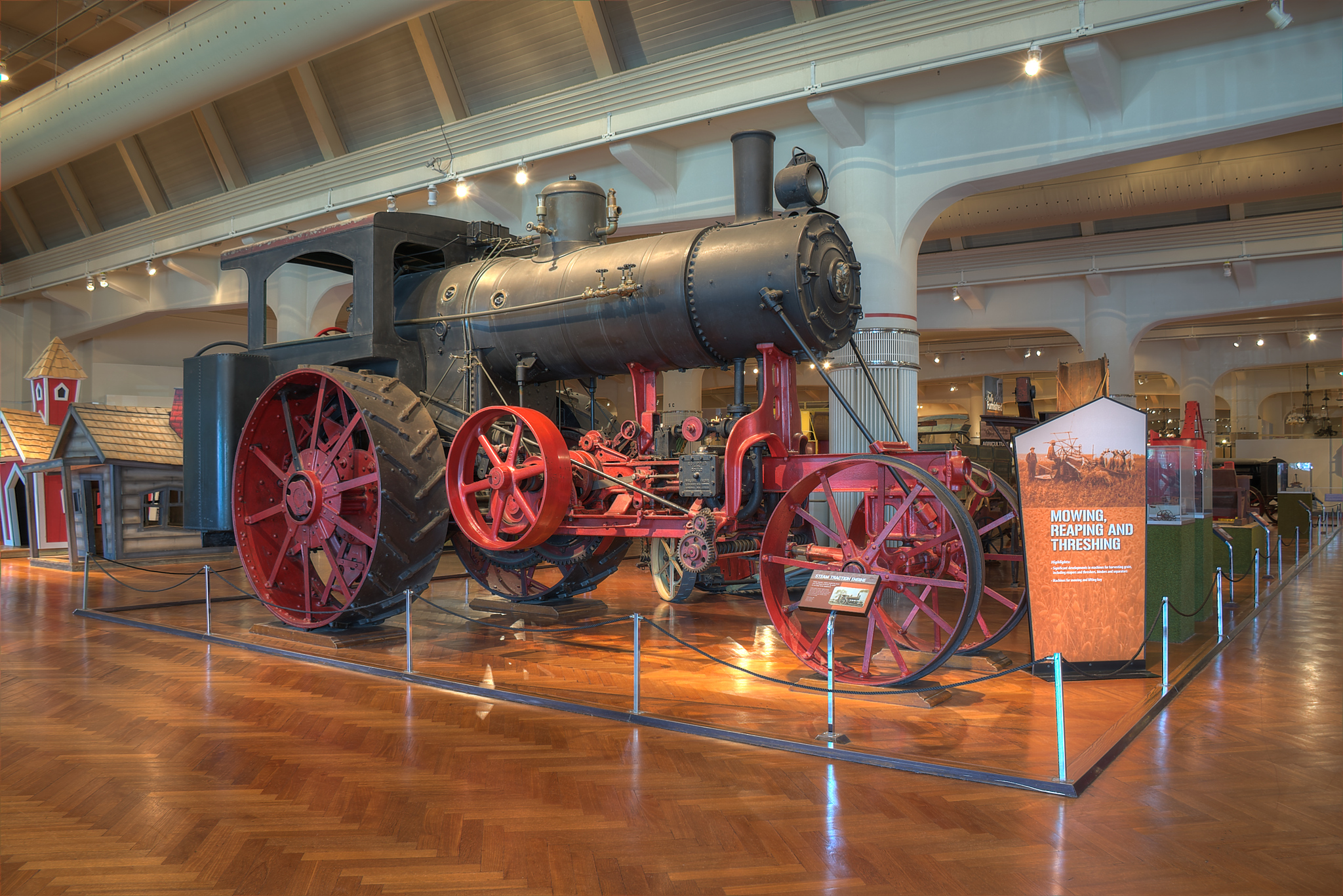
Steam Tractor at the Henry Ford Museum

A steam tractor is a tractor powered by a steam engine which is used for pulling.

In North America, the term steam tractor usually refers to a type of agricultural tractor powered by a steam engine, used extensively in the late 19th and early 20th centuries.

In Great Britain, the term steam tractor is more usually applied to the smallest models of traction engine – typically those weighing seven tons or less – used for hauling small loads on public roads. Although known as light steam tractors, these engines are generally just smaller versions of the "road locomotive".

This article concentrates on the steam-powered agricultural vehicles intended for the direct-pulling of plows and other implements (as opposed to cable-hauling).

== Development ==
Owing to differences in soil conditions, the development of steam-powered agricultural machines differed considerably on either side of the Atlantic.

=== Great Britain ===
In Great Britain, a number of traction engine builders attempted to produce a design of agricultural engine that could pull a plow directly, in place of a team of horses. However, the heavier and wetter soils found in Britain meant that these designs were not successful, being less economical to use than the teams of horses they were intended to replace. These engines were also known as "steam tractors". Instead, farmers resorted to cable-hauled plowing using plowing engines.

A distinctive example of a British-designed (agricultural) steam tractor is the Garrett Suffolk Punch, a 1917 design intended to compete directly with internal combustion-powered alternatives.

=== North America ===
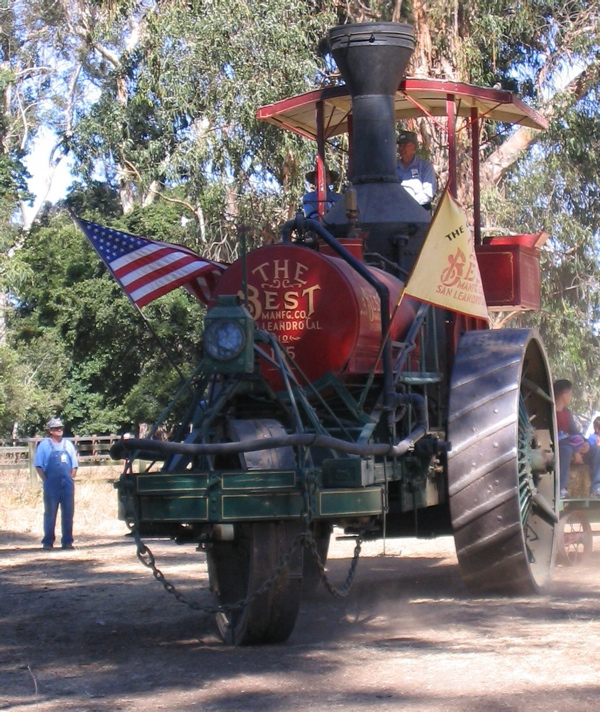
A 1905 Best steam tractor (manufactured in California).

The first steam tractors that were designed specifically for agricultural uses were portable engines built on skids or on wheels and transported to the work area using horses. Later models used the power of the steam engine itself to power a drive train to move the machine and were first known as "traction drive" engines which eventually was shortened to "tractor". These drive mechanisms were one of three types: chain, shaft, and open pinion. The open pinion became the most popular design due to its strength. Later improvements included power steering, differentials, compounded engines, and butt-strap boiler design.

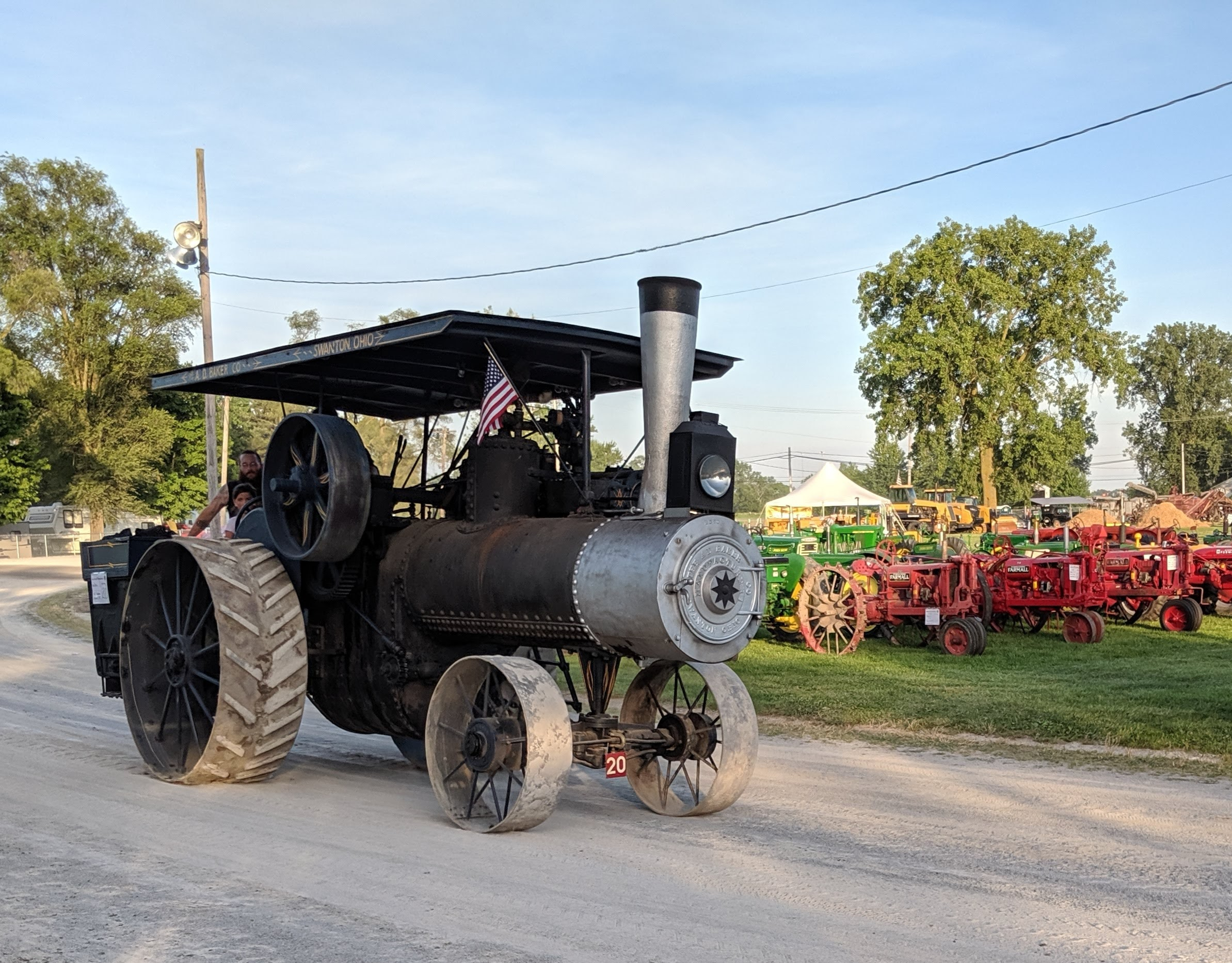
Steam Tractor at National Threshers Association.

The steam engine was gradually phased out by the mid-1920s as the less expensive, lighter, and faster-starting internal combustion (kerosene, petrol or distillate) tractors fully emerged after World War I.

== Uses ==
=== Threshing ===
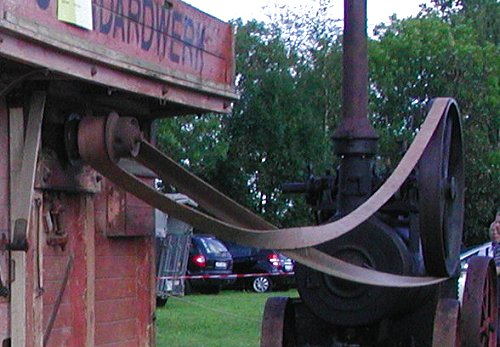
The drive belt: used to transfer power from a portable engine to a threshing machine

These engines were used extensively in rural North America to aid in threshing, in which the owner/operator of a threshing machine or threshing rig would travel from farmstead to farmstead threshing grain. Oats were a common item to be threshed, but wheat and other grains were common as well. On a "threshing day", all the neighbors would gather at that day's farmstead to complete a massive job in one day through cooperation. The women and older girls were in charge of cooking the noon meal and bringing water to the men. The children had various jobs based upon their age and sex. These jobs included driving the bundle racks, pitching bundles into the threshing machine, supplying water for the steam engine, hauling away the freshly threshed grain and scooping it into the granary. Steam traction engines were often too expensive for a single farmer to purchase, so "threshing rings" were often formed. In a threshing ring, multiple farmers pooled their resources to purchase a steam engine. They also chose one person among them to go to a steam school, to learn how to run the engine properly. There were also threshing contractors, who owned their own engine and thresher, and went to different farms, hiring themselves out to thresh grain.

=== Plowing ===
The immense pulling power of steam tractors allowed them to be used for plowing as well. Certain steam tractors were better suited for plowing than others, with the large Minneapolis Threshing Machine Co., J.I. Case, Reeves & Co., and Advance-Rumely engines being prime examples. Some of the largest steam tractors, such as the 150 horsepower (110 kW) Case (known as "Road Locomotives"), were capable of pulling 30 or more plow bottoms, while most were powerful enough to pull between 6 and 20. Differing soil conditions highly affected the plowing abilities of these tractors.

== Manufacturers ==
See: List of traction engine and steam tractor manufacturers

== Festivals and museums ==
List

- List of steam fairs – where preserved steam tractors may be seen in action

Museums

- A Hundred Years of Progress, Carthage, NC
- Hesston Steam Museum (La Porte, Indiana)
- Antique Gas and Steam Engine Museum (Vista, California)
- Antique Powerland (Brooks, Oregon, USA)
- Fort Edmonton Park (Edmonton, Alberta, Canada)
- Heidrick Ag History Center (Woodland, California)
- Heritage Museum on the Old Thresher's Reunion grounds (Mt. Pleasant, Iowa)
- National Agricultural Museum (Szreniawa, Poland)
- Ontario Agricultural Museum (Ontario, Canada)
- Manitoba Agricultural Museum (Austin, Manitoba, Canada)
- Upper Peninsula Steam and Gas Engine Association Museum (Escanaba, Michigan)
- Rough and Tumble (Kinzers, Pennsylvania, USA)

== See also ==
- Farm equipment
- History of steam road vehicles
- Live steam
- Steam car
- Steamroller
- Steam tricycle
- Steam wagon
- Traction engine
