= Portable engine =

Early engine which could be easily moved between work sites

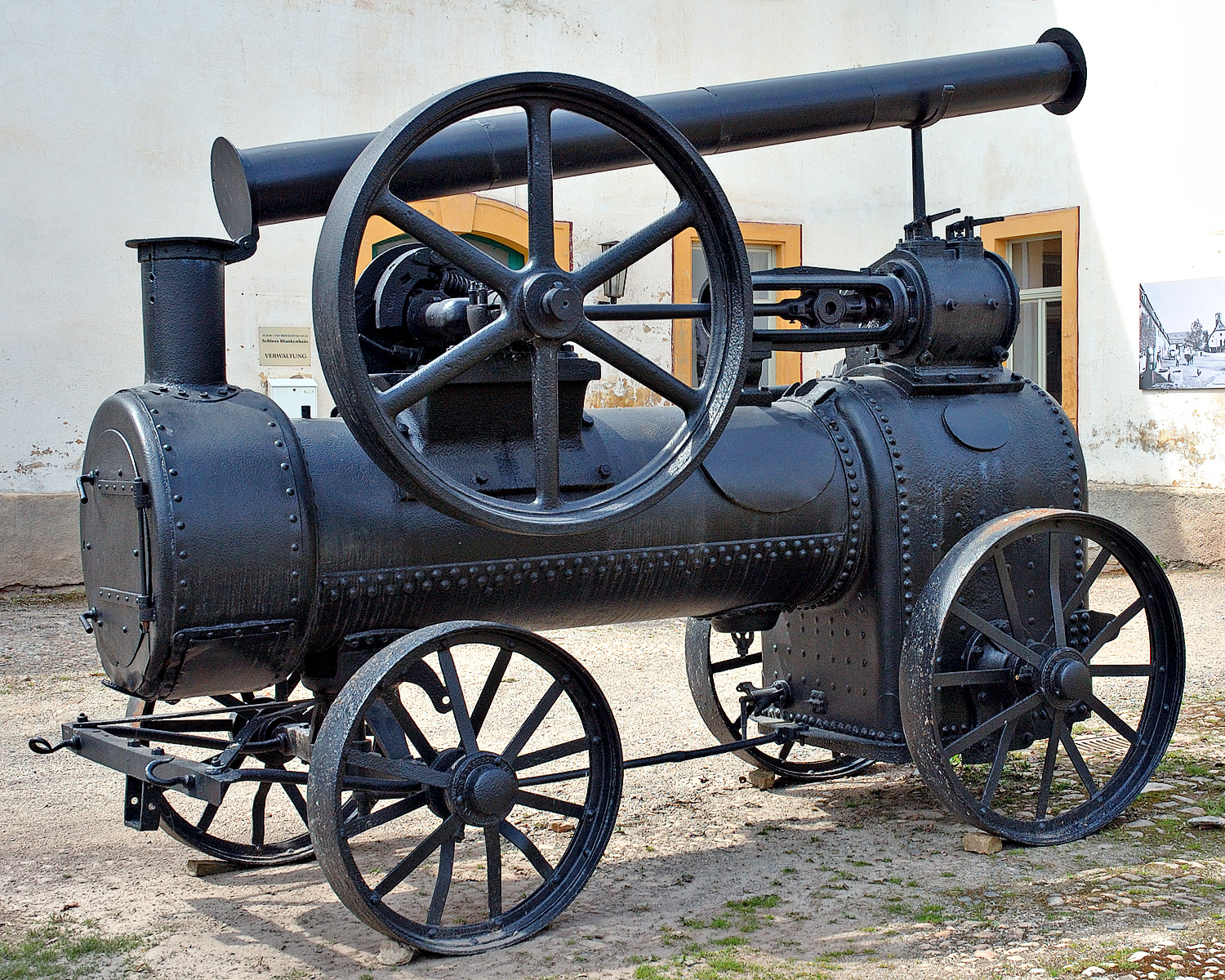
A portable engine, preserved at the museum in Blankenhain Castle, Germany. The chimney has been folded-down, ready for transporting the engine to a new location. The axle under the smokebox (on the left) pivots to allow the engine to be steered. Towing eyes are provided on the same axle assembly to allow the engine to be pulled along.

A Czechoslovak portable engine

A portable engine is an engine, either a steam engine or an internal combustion engine, that sits in one place while operating (providing power to machinery), but (unlike a stationary engine) is portable and thus can be easily moved from one work site to another. Mounted on wheels or skids, it is either towed to the work site or moves there via self-propulsion.

Portable engines were in common use in industrialised countries from the early 19th through early 20th centuries, during an era when mechanical power transmission was widespread. Before that, most power generation and transmission were by animal, water, wind, or human; after that, a combination of electrification (including rural electrification) and modern vehicles and equipment (such as tractors, trucks, cars, engine-generators, and machines with their engines built in) displaced most use of portable engines. In developing countries today, portable engines still have some use (typically in the form of modern small engines mounted on boards), although the technologies mentioned above increasingly limit their demand there as well. In industrialised countries they are no longer used for commercial purposes, but preserved examples can often be seen at steam fairs driving appropriate equipment for demonstration purposes.

Portable engines during their heyday were typically towed to their work sites by draft horses or oxen, or, in the latter part of that era, motive power including self-propulsion or towing by traction engines, steam tractors, other tractors, or trucks. They were used to drive agricultural machinery (such as threshing machines), milling machinery (such as gristmills, sawmills, and ore mills), pumps and fans (such as in mines and oil wells), and factory line shafts (for machine tools, power hammers, presses, and other machines).

== History ==
In common with many other areas of steam technology, the initial design and development of portable engines took place in England, with many other countries initially importing British-built equipment rather than developing their own.

Early steam engines were too large and expensive for use on the average farm; however, the first positive evidence of steam power being used to drive a threshing machine was in 1799 in north Yorkshire. The next recorded application was in 1812, when Richard Trevithick designed the first 'semi-portable' stationary steam engine for agricultural use, known as a "barn engine". This was a high-pressure, rotative engine with a Cornish boiler, for Sir Christopher Hawkins of Probus, Cornwall. It was used to drive a corn threshing machine and was much cheaper to run than the horses it replaced. Indeed, it was so successful that it remained in use for nearly 70 years, and has been preserved by the Science Museum in London. Although termed 'semi-portable', as they could be transported and installed without being dismantled, these engines were essentially stationary. They were used to drive such barn machinery as pumps and hammer mills, bone-crushers, chaff and turnip cutters, and fixed and mobile threshing drums.

It was not until about 1839 that the truly portable engine appeared, allowing the application of steam power beyond the confines of the farmyard. William Tuxford of Boston, Lincolnshire started manufacture of an engine built around a locomotive-style boiler with horizontal smoke tubes. A single cylinder and the crankshaft were mounted on top of the boiler, and the whole assembly was mounted on four wheels: the front pair being steerable and fitted with shafts for horse-haulage between jobs. A large flywheel was mounted on the crankshaft, and a stout leather belt was used to transfer the drive to the equipment being driven.

Ransomes built an early portable in 1841 and exhibited it at the Royal Agricultural Society show that year. The next year Ransomes converted the steam engine to self driving, thus making an intermediate step towards the traction engine.

Several Tuxford engines were displayed at the Royal Agricultural Society's Show at Bristol in 1842, and other manufacturers soon joined in, using the basic design of the Tuxford engine as a pattern for the majority of portable engines produced thereafter.

Early manufacturers in the UK included:

- Alexander Dean of Birmingham
- Ransomes of Ipswich
- William Tuxford and Sons of Boston, Lincolnshire
- Howden of Boston, Lincolnshire
- Clayton & Shuttleworth of Lincoln

This last manufacturer is particularly noteworthy here. The first Clayton & Shuttleworth portable was built in 1845, a two-cylinder engine. In 1852, the company won a gold medal for a portable engine at the Royal Agricultural Society's Gloucester show, and thereafter the business expanded rapidly: they established a second works, in Vienna in 1857, to target the European market, and by 1890 the company had manufactured over 26,000 portable engines, many being exported all over the world.

In the 1850s, John Fowler used a Clayton & Shuttleworth portable engine to drive apparatus in the first public demonstrations of the application of cable haulage to cultivation.

In parallel with the early portable engine development, many engineers attempted to make them self-propelled – the fore-runners of the traction engine. In most cases this was achieved by fitting a sprocket on the end of the crankshaft, and running a chain from this to a larger sprocket on the rear axle. These experiments met with mixed success.

Thomas Aveling commented that it was absurd to use four horses to pull a steam engine job-to-job, when the engine possessed ten times the strength of the horses. It was therefore inevitable, once self-propelled traction engines had become sufficiently reliable, that they would take over the roles of many portable engines, and this indeed started to happen from the late 1860s. In the UK this development was perhaps somewhat delayed by various acts of parliament that limited the use of steam powered vehicles on roads. Portable engines, being horse drawn, faced far fewer restrictions.

Other builders manufactured engines around the world. Small machine shops could assemble units with a small engine and vertical boiler and put it on wheels. In North America dozens of builders entered the market—Case, Sawyer Massey, and Gaar Scott for example. Native builders erected engines in France, Italy, Sweden and Germany.

However, the portable engine was never completely replaced by the traction engine. Firstly, the portable, having no gearing, was markedly cheaper, and secondly, numerous applications benefitted from a simple steam engine that could be moved, but did not require the additional complexity of one that could move itself.

Small numbers of portables continued to be built even after traction engine production ceased. Robey and Company of Lincoln were still offering portables for sale into the 1960s. The English builders produced in the order of 100,000 portable steam engines in the hundred year time period both for home use and export abroad.

From about 1900 onward, the requirement for a small cheap source of power on farms was increasingly taken over by internal combustion engines, such as hit-and-miss engines and, later, stationary and portable industrial versions of car and truck engines, either for belt use or built into engine-generators.

== Usage ==
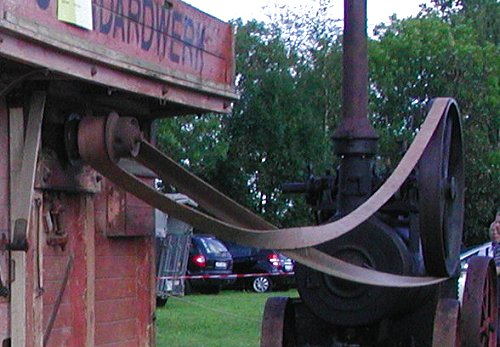
The drive belt: used to transfer power from the engine's flywheel. Here shown driving a threshing machine.

Apart from threshing work, portable engines were used to drive corn-mills, centrifugal pumps, stone-crushers, dynamos, chaff-cutters, hay-balers and saw benches. They were even used to generate electricity for floodlighting at football matches, the first instance being at Bramall Lane, Sheffield in 1878.

In general, the portable engine is hauled to the work area, often a farmyard or field, and a long drive belt is fitted between the engine's flywheel and the driving wheel of the equipment to be powered.

In a number of cases, rather than being towed from site-to-site, the portable engine was semi-permanently installed in a building as a stationary steam engine, although the wheels were not necessarily removed. In this configuration, they are generally called Semi-portable engines.

A more extreme use occurs where the engine is removed from the boiler and is re-used as a stationary engine. Often, the boiler is also re-used (without its wheels) to provide the steam. As of 2007, there are still examples of such dismantled portable engines working commercially in small rice mills in Burma (and, no doubt, elsewhere too). Such examples are easy to identify due to the curved saddle, below the cylinder block, that was used to mount the engine to the boiler.

== Construction ==
=== General layout ===
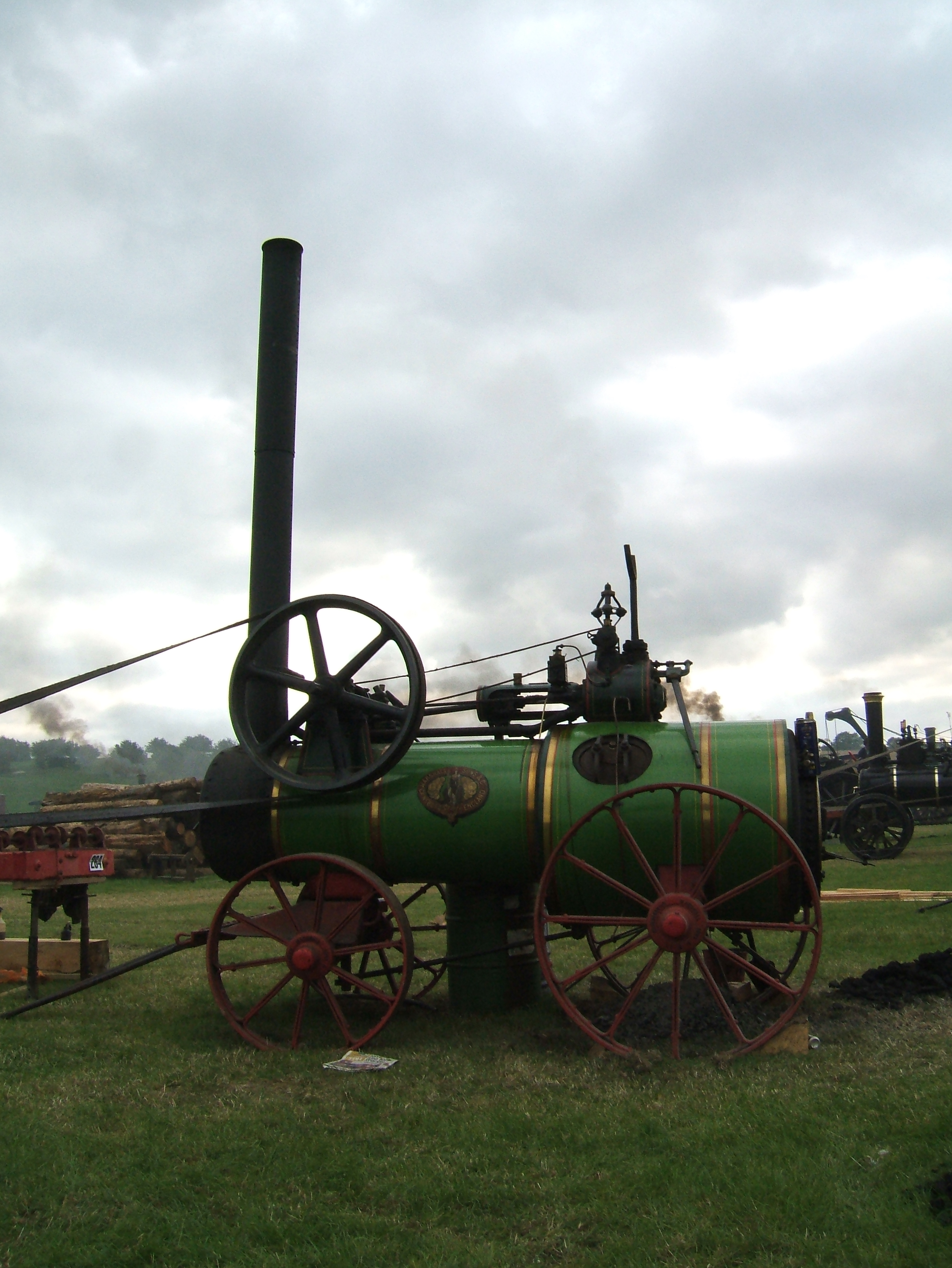
Preserved Marshall 6nhp single-cylinder portable engine, no. 87866, built 1936. This design has a 'colonial' boiler and a long firebox for burning logs.

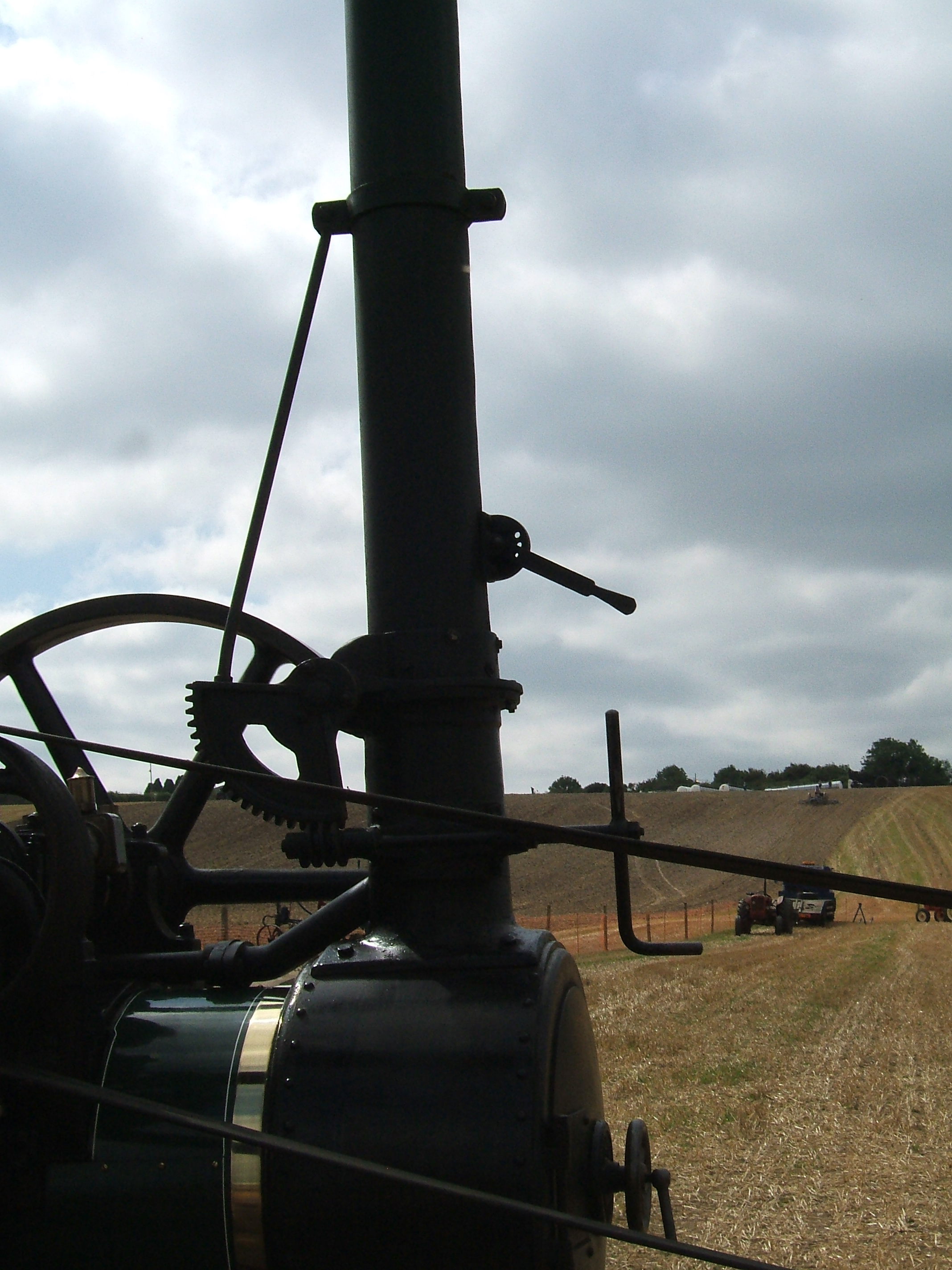
Preserved Robey 3nhp engine, showing chimney detail. The upper lever controls a damper, while the handle below operates an unusual worm-and-quadrant-gear arrangement for raising and lowering the chimney for transport.

The most common arrangement follows the original Tuxford design. Although this closely resembles the common layout of a traction engine, the engine of a portable is usually reversed, with the cylinders at the firebox end and the crankshaft at the smokebox end. This layout was designed to position the regulator close to the firebox, making it easier for the engineman to maintain the fire and control the engine speed from the one location. An added bonus is that the flywheel is clear of the rear road wheels so the latter can be set on a narrower track, making the engine easier to manoeuvre through field gates.

A few makers (e.g. Fowler) made their portable engines in the same style as traction engines, with the cylinder at the smokebox end. This was probably to reduce manufacturing costs, as there is no other obvious benefit of doing this. (Thomas Aveling realised that, for a traction engine, it would be better to position the flywheel within reach of the driver in case he carelessly allowed the crank to stop on top dead centre (where it could not self-start) and most other traction engine manufacturers followed this same idea.)

=== Boiler ===
This is usually a fire-tube boiler with a locomotive-type firebox. However, some designs (e.g. the Marshall "Britannia" (pictured)) have circular, marine-type, fireboxes. This latter type were also known by British manufacturers as 'colonial' boilers, as they were mainly intended for export to 'the Colonies', and had a high ground clearance for travelling along rough tracks.

Fuel is usually coal but the engine may be designed to use wood fuel, straw or bagasse (sugar cane residue) instead. A longer, circular firebox is particularly suitable for burning logs rather than shorter wood billets. Machines designed for wood-burning may be fitted with spark arrestors.

=== Engine ===
Most portable engines are single-cylinder but two-cylinder engines were also built. The slide valve is usually driven by a single eccentric and no reversing gear is fitted. There is usually a belt-driven governor to keep the engine running at constant speed, even if the load fluctuates.

The engine may have one or two flywheels mounted on the same crankshaft. Where two are provided, they are mounted either side of the engine and may be of different diameters. A smaller flywheel provides a slower speed for farmyard work (e.g. chopping feedstuffs) than is required for driving a threshing machine (for example).

=== Auxiliaries ===
The crankshaft drives a boiler feedwater pump which draws water from a barrel placed alongside the engine. Many engines have a simple, but effective, feedwater heater which works by blowing a small portion of the exhaust steam into the water barrel. The barrel also acts as an oil separator. Oil in the exhaust steam rises to the top of the barrel and can be skimmed off.

=== Chimney ===
A tall chimney is provided to ensure a good draught for the fire. To permit negotiation of overhead obstacles, the chimney is hinged at its base, and is folded down for transport and storage. A suitably shaped bracket is usually provided towards the firebox end to support the chimney when folded.

=== Wheels ===
Most designs are fitted with four wheels and no suspension of any kind. The first portables had wooden wheels, but as the engines became more powerful (and heavier), fabricated steel wheels were fitted instead.

The 'front' wheels are normally smaller than those at the back. This is because they are mounted on the swivelling fore-carriage, under the smokebox, and large wheels would be liable to hit the boiler when the engine was turned around a corner. An added bonus is that a larger diameter flywheel may be fitted, providing a more steady power output.

== Preservation ==
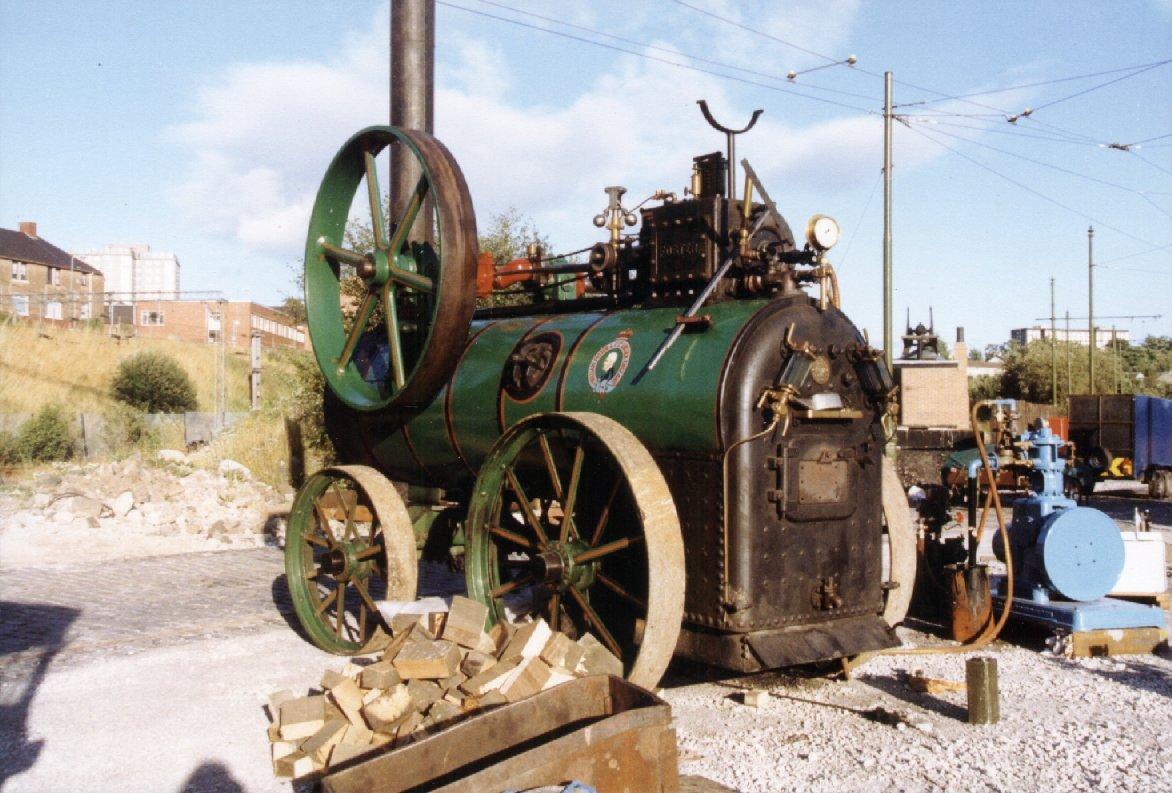
A large Foster wood burning portable engine at Summerlee museum in Coatbridge

Many portable engines still survive, as they were built in large quantities and were shipped to many remote corners of the Earth. A substantial number of them have been preserved, with many restored to full working order: their relatively small size and simpler construction, compared to a traction engine, makes them a much more viable proposition for restoration by the average enthusiast. (That is, provided the boiler is in reasonable condition: boiler repairs can be very expensive; replacement boilers even more so.)

It is usually possible to see portable engines working at traction engine rallies and steam festivals. At the Great Dorset Steam Fair, for example, portable engines may be found in the relevant demonstration areas driving saw benches, threshing machines, rock crushers and other contemporary equipment.

Numerous agricultural and industrial museums include portable engines within their collections.

What is thought to be the oldest surviving Marshall product, works no. 415, a 2.5 nhp portable from 1866, may be seen at the Turon Technology Museum (Museum of Power), in New South Wales. This engine is also the oldest documented portable in Australia.

== See also ==
- Farm equipment
- List of traction engine manufacturers – many traction engine manufacturers also built portable engines
- Semi-portable engine
