= Turnrow =

Turnrow may refer to:

- A Headland (agriculture)
- A bi-annual journal of short fiction, poetry, visual art, and interviews, published by the University of Louisiana at Monroe
