= Russell & Company (disambiguation) =

Russell & Company was the largest American trading house of the mid-19th century in China.

It can also refer to:

- Russell & Company (manufacturer), an engine maker in Ohio
- Russell & Company, a shipbuilder in Scotland later renamed Lithgows
