= Traction engine =

Steam-powered haulage engine

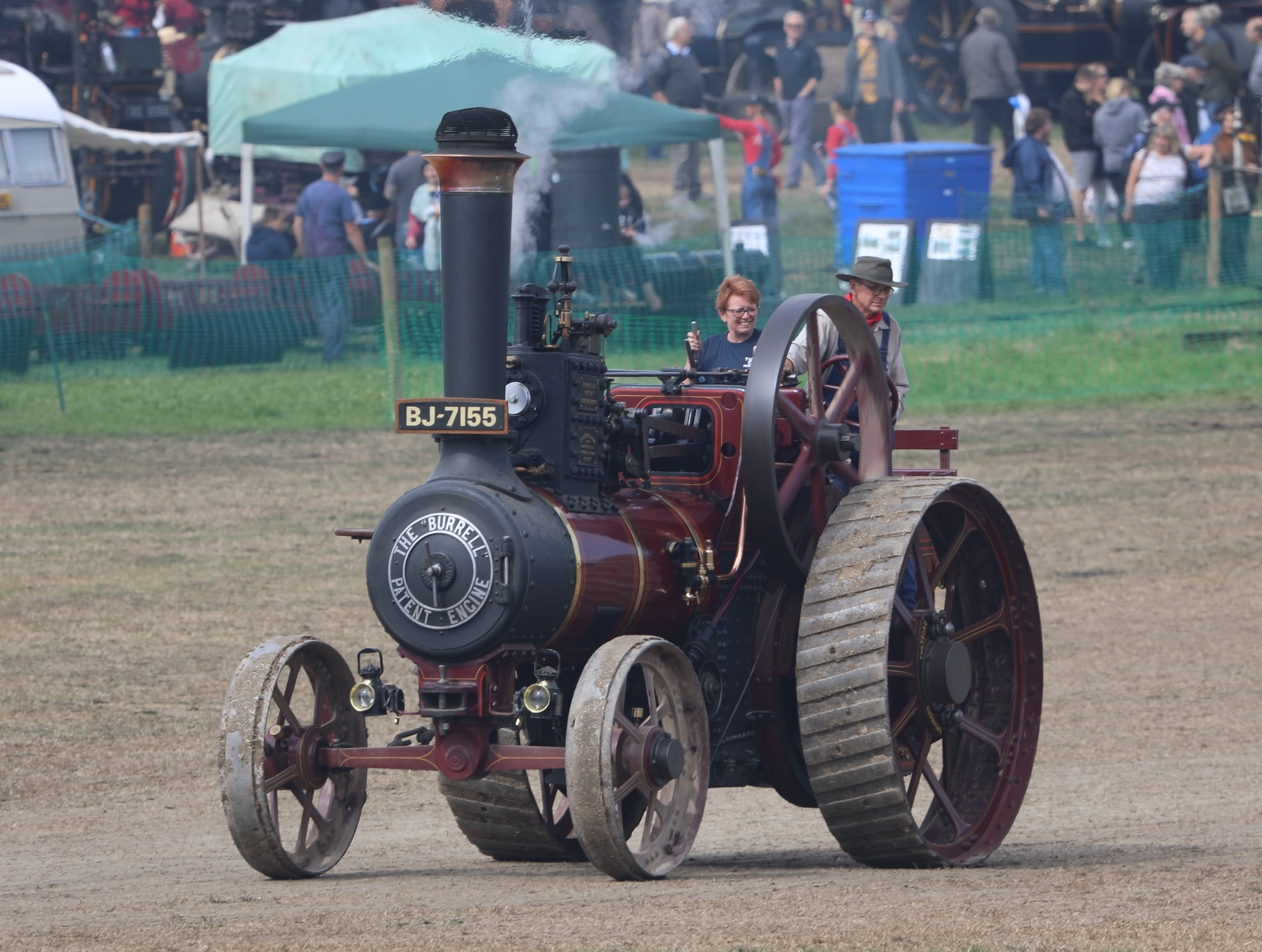
1909 Charles Burrell & Sons 6 nominal horsepower general purpose engine, at Great Dorset Steam Fair in 2018

A traction engine is a steam-powered tractor used to move heavy loads on roads, plough ground or to provide power at a chosen location. The name derives from the Latin tractus, meaning 'drawn', since the prime function of any traction engine is to draw a load behind it. They are sometimes called road locomotives to distinguish them from railway locomotives – that is, steam engines that run on rails.

Traction engines tend to be large, robust and powerful, but also heavy, slow, and difficult to manoeuvre. Nevertheless, they revolutionized agriculture and road haulage at a time when the only alternative prime mover was the draught horse.

They became popular in industrialised countries from around 1850, when the first self-propelled portable steam engines for agricultural use were developed. Production continued well into the early part of the 20th century, when competition from internal combustion engine-powered tractors saw them fall out of favour, although some continued in commercial use in the United Kingdom well into the 1950s and later. All types of traction engines have now been superseded in commercial use. However, several thousand examples have been preserved worldwide, many in working order. Steam fairs are held throughout the year in the United Kingdom and in other countries, where visitors can experience working traction engines at close hand.

Traction engines were cumbersome and ill-suited for crossing soft or heavy ground, so their agricultural use was usually either "on the belt" – powering farm machinery by means of a continuous leather belt driven by the flywheel, a form of power take-off – or in pairs, dragging an implement on a cable from one side of a field to another. However, where soil conditions permitted, direct hauling of implements ("off the drawbar") was preferred; in America, this led to the divergent development of the steam tractor.

American designs were far more varied than those of the British, with different boiler positions, wheel numbers and piston placements being used. Additionally American engines often had higher top speeds than those of Britain, as well as the ability to run on straw.

== History ==
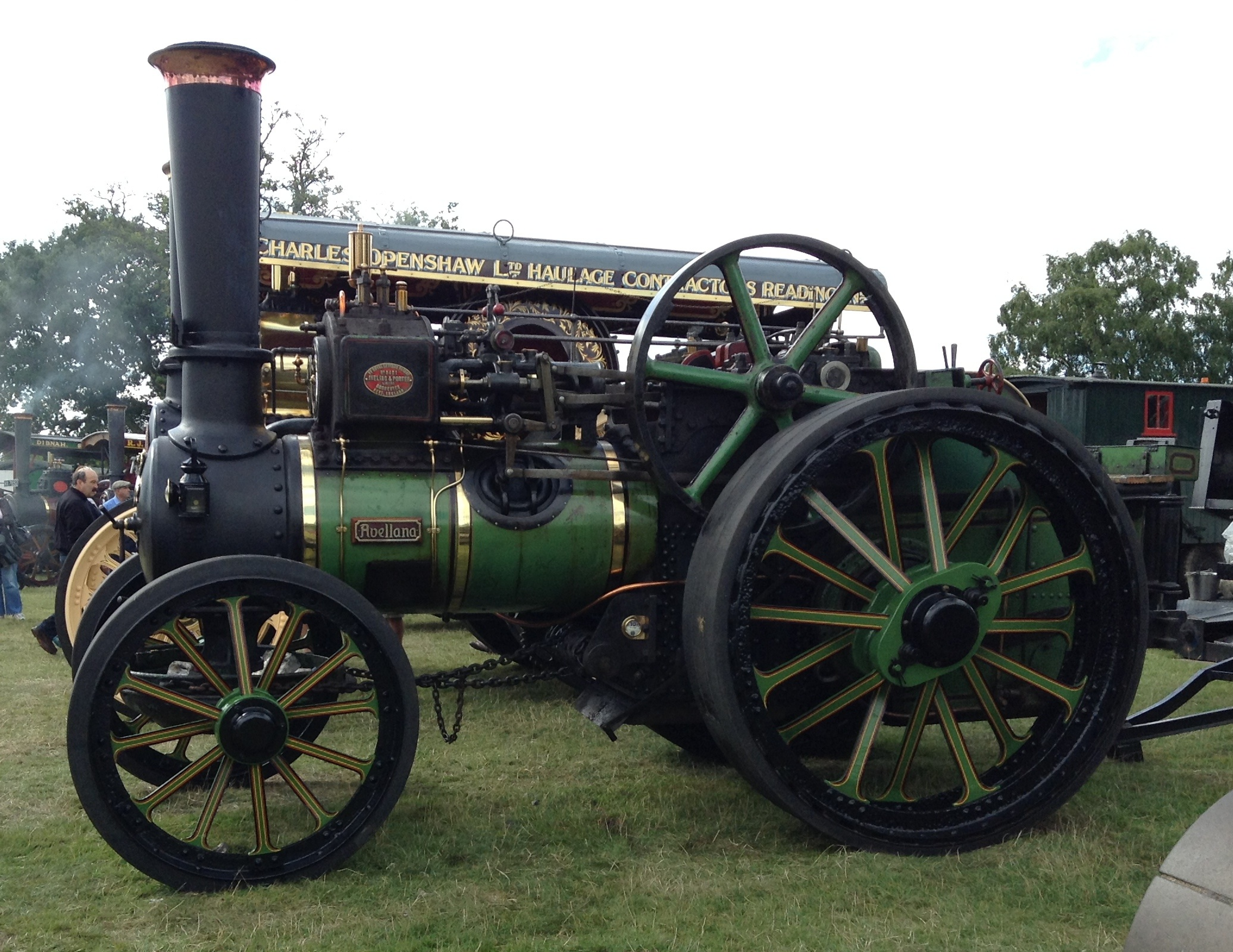
Aveling & Porter traction engine 'Avellana'

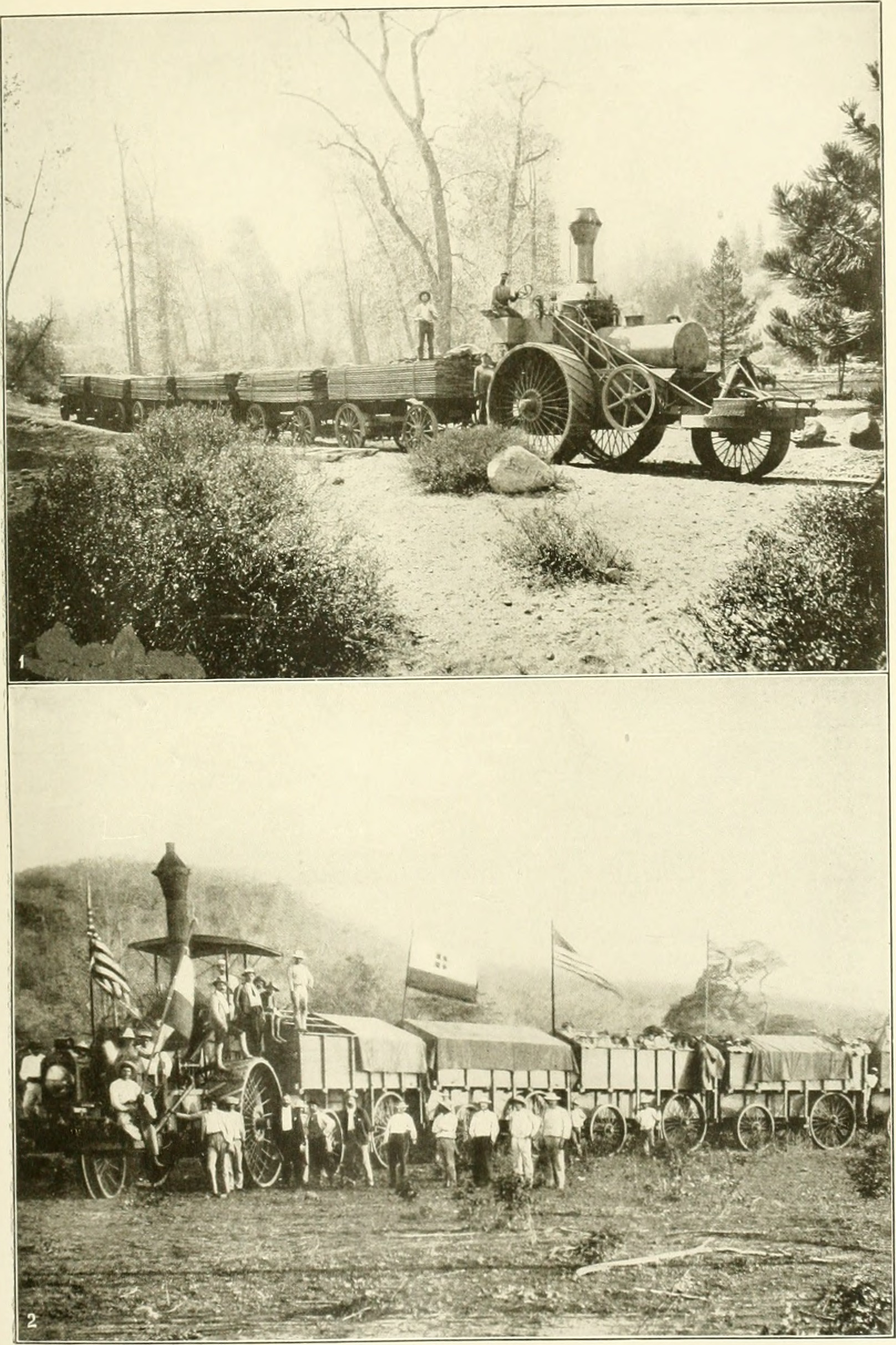
A 110 horse power Traction Engine hauling timber in the Sierra Nevada Mountains. 2. Traction engine hauling war material for the Nicaraguan government.

The limits of technical knowledge and manufacturing technology meant that practicable road vehicles powered by steam did not start to appear until the early years of the 19th century. In 1841, Ransomes, Sims & Jefferies produced an early traction engine. The design (which was led by a horse to steer it) failed to attract any purchasers. They tried again in 1849, this time without the steering horse, but the machine was underpowered for the threshing work it was designed for. Further attempts were made in the second half of the 1850s with Richard Bach of Birmingham, Charles Burrell of Thetford and Allin Williams all either building or designing road going steam engines.

The commercially successful traction engine was developed from an experiment in 1859 when Thomas Aveling modified a Clayton & Shuttleworth portable engine, which had to be hauled from job to job by horses, into a self-propelled one. This alteration was made by fitting a long driving chain between the crankshaft and the rear axle. Aveling is regarded as "the father of the traction engine". Aveling's first engine still required a horse for steering. Other influences were existing vehicles which were the first to be referred to as traction engines such as the Boydell engines manufactured by various companies and those developed for road haulage by Bray. The first half of the 1860s was a period of great experimentation, but by the end of the decade the standard form of the traction engine had evolved and would change little over the next sixty years.

As part of these improvements the steering was improved to no longer need a horse, and the drive chain was replaced with gears. In America traction engines fitted with continuous tracks were being used from 1869. Compound engine designs were introduced in 1881. Until the quality of roads improved there was little demand for faster vehicles, and engines were geared accordingly to cope with their use on rough roads and farm tracks.

Right through to the first decades of the twentieth century, manufacturers continued to seek a way to reach the economic potential of direct-pull ploughing and, particularly in North America, this led to the American development of the steam tractor. British companies such as Mann's and Garrett developed potentially viable direct ploughing engines; however, market conditions were against them and they failed to gain widespread popularity. These market conditions arose in the wake of the First World War when there was a glut of surplus equipment available as a result of British Government policy. Large numbers of Fowler ploughing engines had been constructed in order to increase the land under tillage during the war and many new light Fordson F tractors had been imported from 1917 onwards.

=== Decline ===
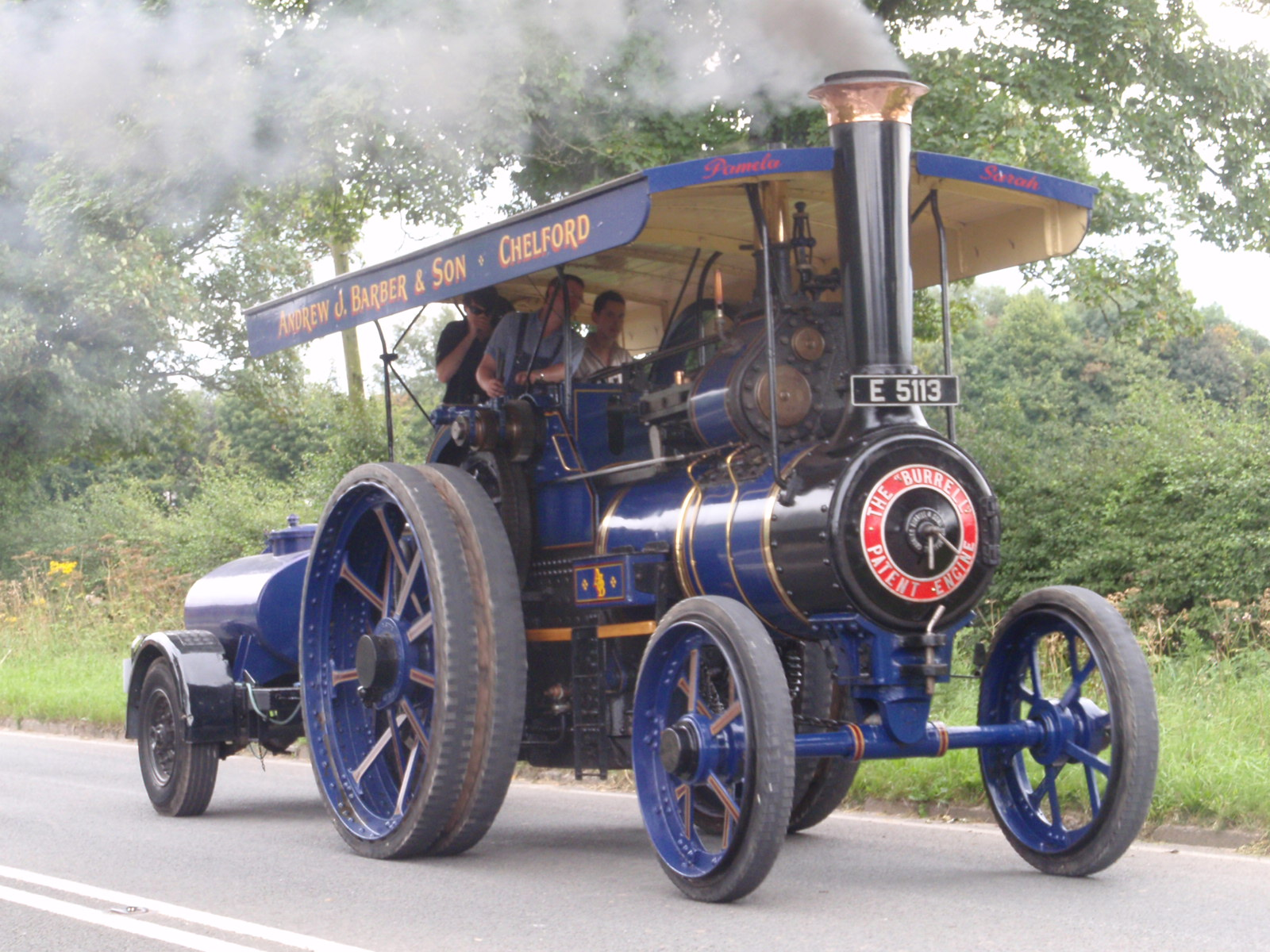
Preserved Burrell road locomotive pulling a water cart, near Jodrell Bank, Cheshire, England

Road steam disappeared through restrictions and charges that drove up their operating costs. Through 1921, steam tractors had demonstrated clear economic advantages over horse power for heavy hauling and short journeys. However, petrol lorries were starting to show better efficiency and could be purchased cheaply as war surplus; on a busy route a 3-ton petrol lorry could save about £100 per month compared to its steam equivalent, in spite of restrictive speed limits and relatively high fuel prices and maintenance costs.

Throughout the 1920s and 1930s there were tighter restrictions on road steam haulage, including speed, smoke and vapour limits and a 'wetted tax', where the tax due was proportional to the size of the wetted area of the boiler; this made steam engines less competitive against domestically produced internal combustion engined units (although imports were subject to taxes of up to 33%). As a result of the Salter Report on road funding, an 'axle weight tax' was introduced in 1933 in order to charge commercial motor vehicles more for the costs of maintaining the road system and to do away with the perception that the free use of roads was subsidising the competitors of rail freight. The tax was payable by all road hauliers in proportion to the axle load and was particularly restrictive on steam propulsion, which was heavier than its petrol equivalent.

Initially, imported oil was taxed much more than British-produced coal, but in 1934 Oliver Stanley, the Minister for Transport, reduced taxes on fuel oils while raising the Road Fund charge on road locomotives to £100 per year (equivalent to around £9000 today, 2024) provoking protests by engine manufacturers, hauliers, showmen and the coal industry. This was at a time of high unemployment in the mining industry, when the steam haulage business represented a market of 950,000 tons of coal annually. The tax was devastating to the businesses of heavy hauliers and showmen and precipitated the scrapping of many engines.

The last new UK-built traction engine was sold in 1944, although many continued in commercial use for many years while there remained experienced enginemen available to drive them. Commercial use continued until 1992 with a William Foster & Co. engine being used to power a saw mill. Engines already in preservation continued to perform occasional commercial jobs until at least 1998.

=== Preservation ===
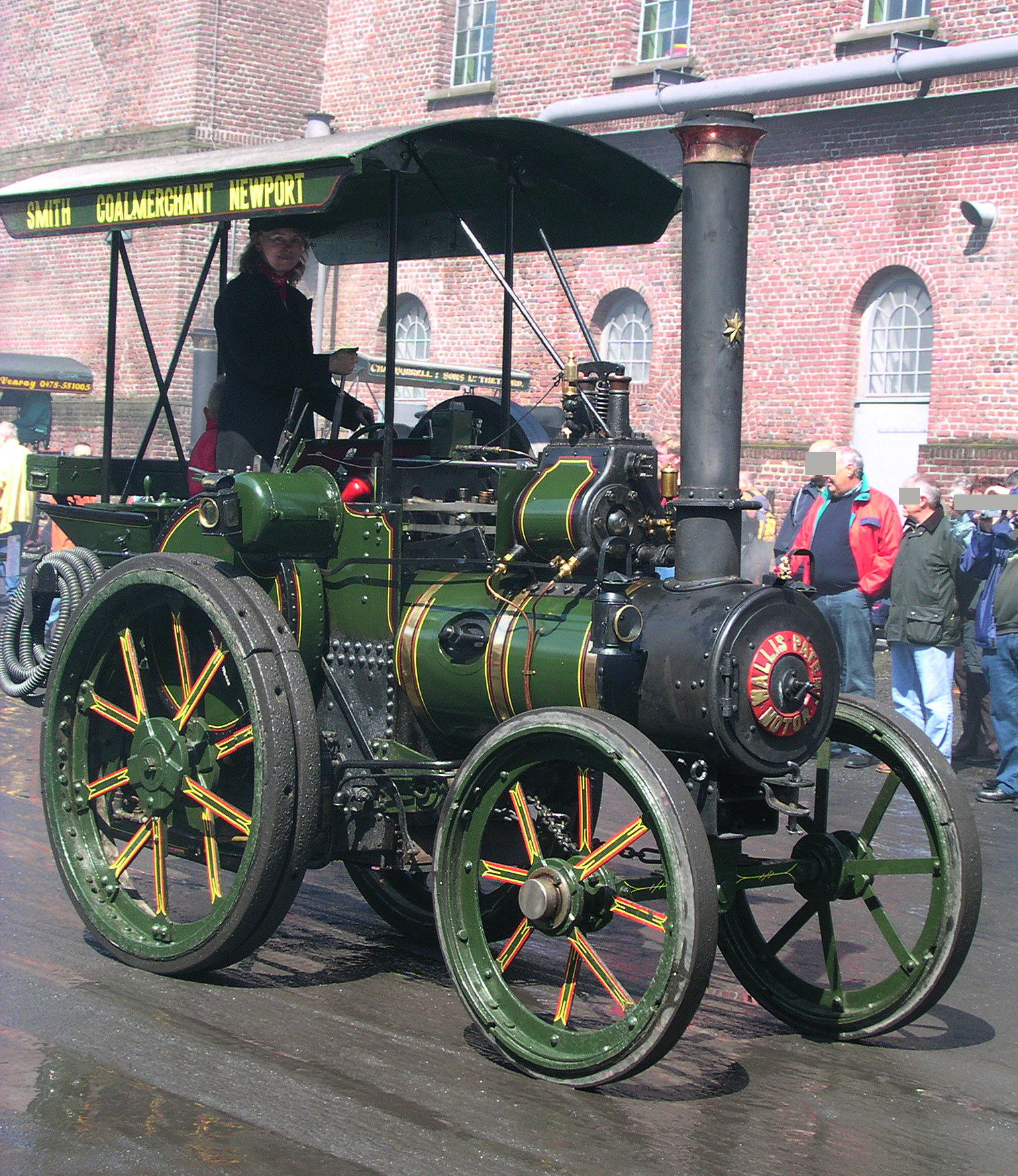
Wallis & Steevens 3 ton traction engine Lena

Perhaps the first organisation to take a general interest in traction engine preservation in the UK was the Road Locomotive Society formed in 1937.

From the 1950s, the 'preservation movement' started to build as enthusiasts realised that traction engines were being scrapped. Many of the remaining engines were bought by enthusiasts, and restored to working order. Traction engine rallies began, initially as races between engine owners and their charges, later developing into the significant tourist attractions that take place in many locations each year.

The Traction Engine Register records the details of traction engines, steam road rollers, steam wagons, steam fire engines and portable engines that are known to survive in the United Kingdom and Irish Republic. It recorded 2,851 self moving engines and wagons, 687 portable engines (non-self moving), 160 steam fire engines existing in 2016. A new edition of the Register is planned in 2020. It was previously estimated in May 2011 by an unknown source that over 2,000 traction engines have been preserved. This figure may include engines preserved elsewhere in the world, particularly the US, Canada, Australia and New Zealand, but if so, is an underestimate. Comprehensive information on past UK manufacturers and their production is recorded by the Road Locomotive Society based in the UK.

== Operation ==
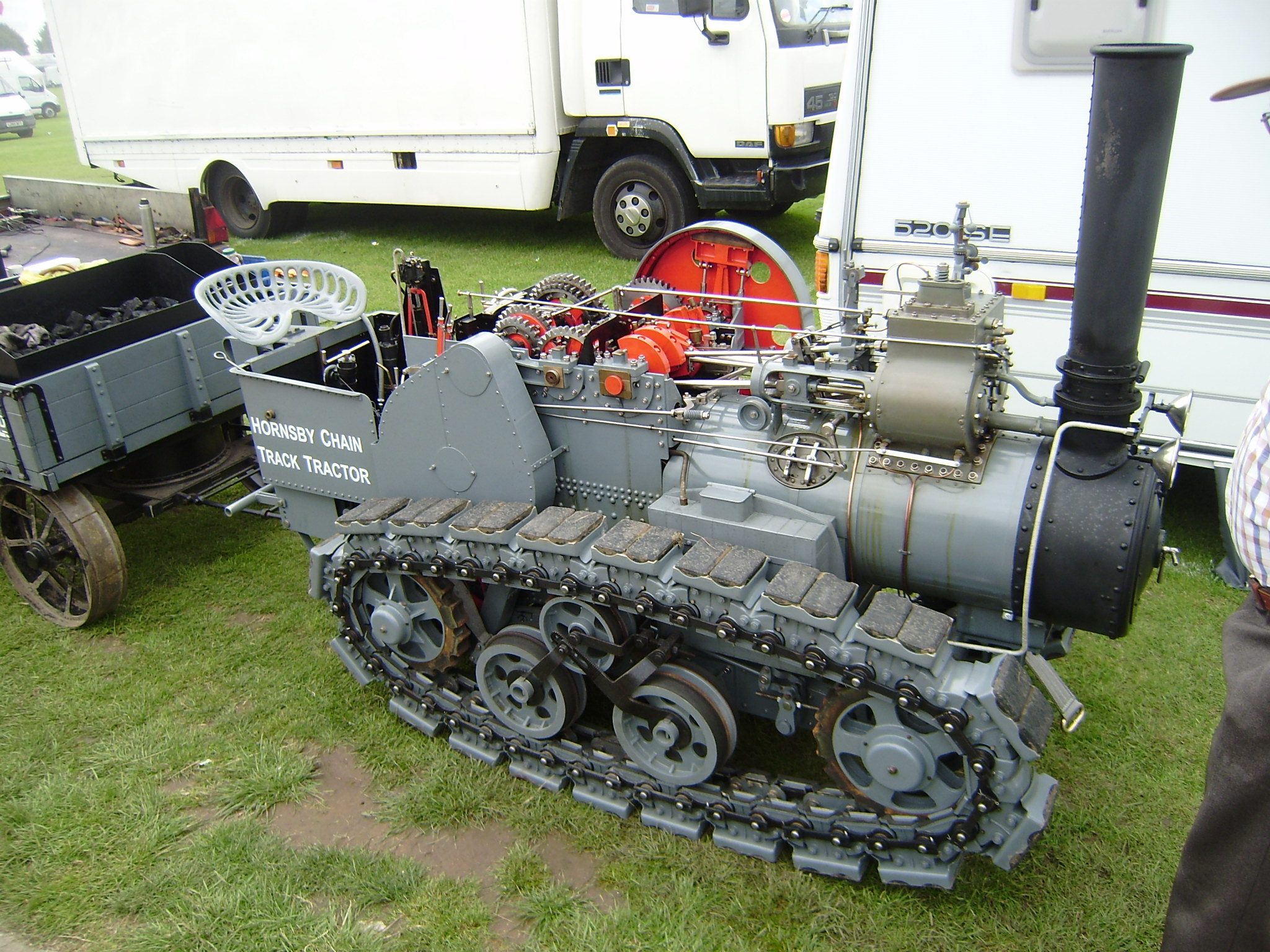
Hornsby chain tractor (working scale model)

Although the first traction engines employed a chain drive, it is more typical for large gears to be used to transfer the drive from the crankshaft to the rear axle.

The machines typically have two large powered wheels at the back and two smaller wheels for steering at the front. However, some traction engines used a four-wheel-drive variation, and some experimented with an early form of caterpillar track.

== Types and usage ==
Traction engines saw commercial use in a variety of roles between the mid-nineteenth and mid-twentieth centuries. Each role required a machine with a different set of characteristics, and the traction engine evolved into a number of different types to suit these different roles.

=== Agricultural (general purpose) engine ===
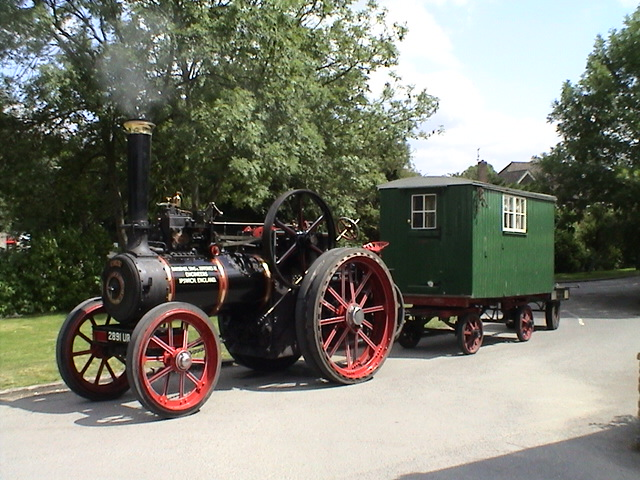
An agricultural engine, towing a living van and a water cart: Ransomes, Sims & Jefferies 6 nhp Jubilee of 1908

General purpose engines were the most common form in the countryside. They were used for hauling and as a stationary power source. Even when farmers did not own such a machine they would rely upon it from time to time. Many farms would use draught horses throughout the year, but during the harvest, threshing contractors would travel from farm to farm hauling the threshing machine which would be set up in the field and powered from the engine – a good example of the moveable stationary engine.

==== US (agricultural) traction engine ====
Favourable soil conditions meant that US traction engines usually pulled their ploughs behind them, thereby eliminating the complexities of providing a cable drum and extra gearing, hence simplifying maintenance. American traction engines were manufactured in a variety of sizes, with the 6 nhp Russell being the smallest commercially made, and the large engines made by Russell, Case, and Reeves being the largest.

=== Ploughing engine ===
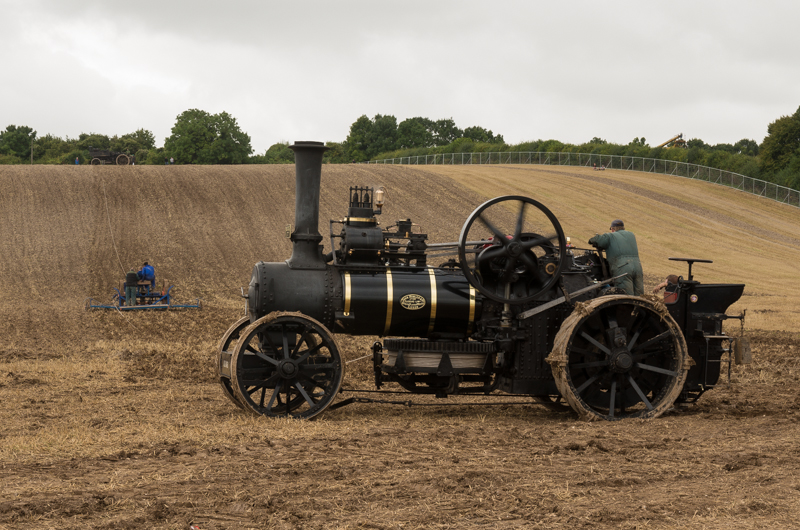
A John Fowler & Co. Ploughing Engine – the winding drum is mounted below the boiler

A distinct form of traction engine, characterised by the provision of a large diameter winding drum driven by separate gearing from the steam engine. Onto the drum a long length of wire rope was wound, which was used to haul an implement, such as a plough, across a field, while the engine remained on the headland. This minimized the area of land subject to soil compaction.

The winding drum was either mounted horizontally (below the boiler), vertically (to one side), or even concentrically, so that it encircled the boiler. The majority were underslung (horizontal), however, and necessitated the use of an extra-long boiler to allow enough space for the drum to fit between the front and back wheels. These designs were the largest and longest traction engines to be built.

Single-sided steam ploughing

Mostly the ploughing engines worked in pairs, one on each side of the field, with the wire rope from each machine fastened to the implement to be hauled. The two drivers communicated by signals using the engine whistles. The engines in the pairs differed slightly with one designed to feed the cable out on the left side and the other on the right. Occasionally an alternative system was used where the plough was pulled between a single engine and an anchor.

Double-sided steam ploughing

Mostly the ploughing engines worked in pairs, one on each side of the field, with the wire rope from each machine fastened to the implement to be hauled. The two drivers communicated by signals using the engine whistles. The engines in the pairs differed slightly with one designed to feed the cable out on the left side and the other on the right. Occasionally an alternative system was used where the plough was pulled between a single engine and an anchor.

A variety of implements were constructed for use with ploughing engines. The most common were the balance plough and the cultivator – ploughing and cultivating being the most physically demanding jobs to do on an arable farm. Other implements could include a mole drainer, used to create an underground drainage channel or pipe, or a dredger bucket for dredging rivers or moats. The engines were frequently provided with a 'spud tray' on the front axle, to store the 'spuds' which would be fitted to the wheels when travelling across claggy ground.

Ploughing engines were rare in the US; ploughs were usually hauled directly by an agricultural engine or steam tractor.

==== History ====
The first steam ploughing engine built and trialled was in 1837 when John Heathcoat MP demonstrated a steam powered vehicle he designed for ploughing very soft ground. This used a very early form of continuous tracks, and its twin-cylinder steam engine could be either used for the ploughing winch or for propulsion. Another ploughing engine, devised by Peter Drummond-Burrell, 22nd Baron Willoughby de Eresby, possibly designed by Daniel Gooch and constructed at Swindon Works, the Royal Highland and Agricultural Society of Scotland, awarded £100 out of a possible £500 of its prize for creating a steam ploughing engine, was exhibited at the Great Exhibition of 1851 in London. Lord Willoughby had indicated that his design could be copied freely, and Fowler had visited Grimsthorpe Castle, the estate where the ploughing engines were deployed. Between 1855 and 1857 a farmer by the name of William Smith and John Fowler developed wire driven ploughing engines that were powered by portable engines. By 1863 W. Savory and Sons had introduced a mobile ploughing engine and were using engines at both ends of the field. Their wire drum was vertical and was mounted around the boiler of the engine.

Production took place outside the UK with Kemna Bau of Germany producing ploughing engines.

Peak use in Britain was during World War 1 with a bit over 600 pairs as the country attempted to increase food production. Use of ploughing engines declined in the 1920s as internal combustion engine powered tractors took over. John Fowler & Co. stopped producing of ploughing engines in 1935 . Low prices in the aftermath of World War 2 meant a few farmers purchased them and continued to use them into the 1950s. As late as 1998 few engines in preservation were taking the occasional commercial job dredging lakes.

=== Steam tractor (US) ===
In North America, the term steam tractor usually refers to a type of agricultural tractor powered by a steam engine, used extensively in the late 19th and early 20th centuries.

=== Steam tractor (UK) ===
A Fowler traction engine driving a racksaw

In Great Britain, the term steam tractor is more usually applied to the smallest models of traction engine – typically those weighing below 5 tons for the engine to be single manned (up until 1923 anything above had to be manned by at least two people; a driver and steersman); used for hauling small loads on public roads. In 1923 the weight limit was raised to 7.5 tons. Although known as light steam tractors, these engines are generally just smaller versions of the road locomotive.

They were popular in the timber trade in the UK, although variations were also designed for general light road haulage and showman's use.

The most popular of these designs was probably the Garrett 4CD, meaning 4 nominal horse power compound.

=== Road locomotive ===
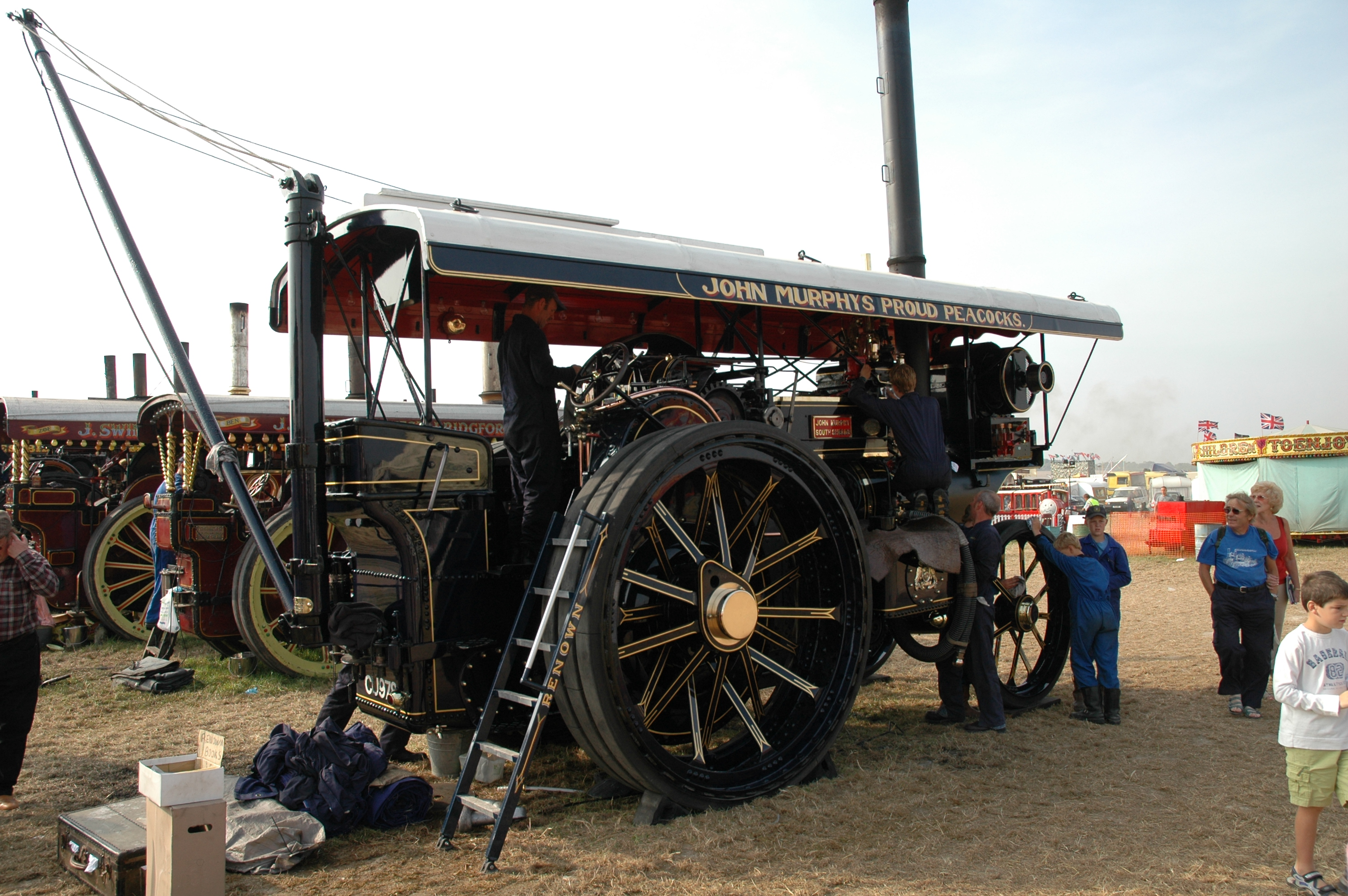
A Showman's Engine at the Great Dorset Steam Fair

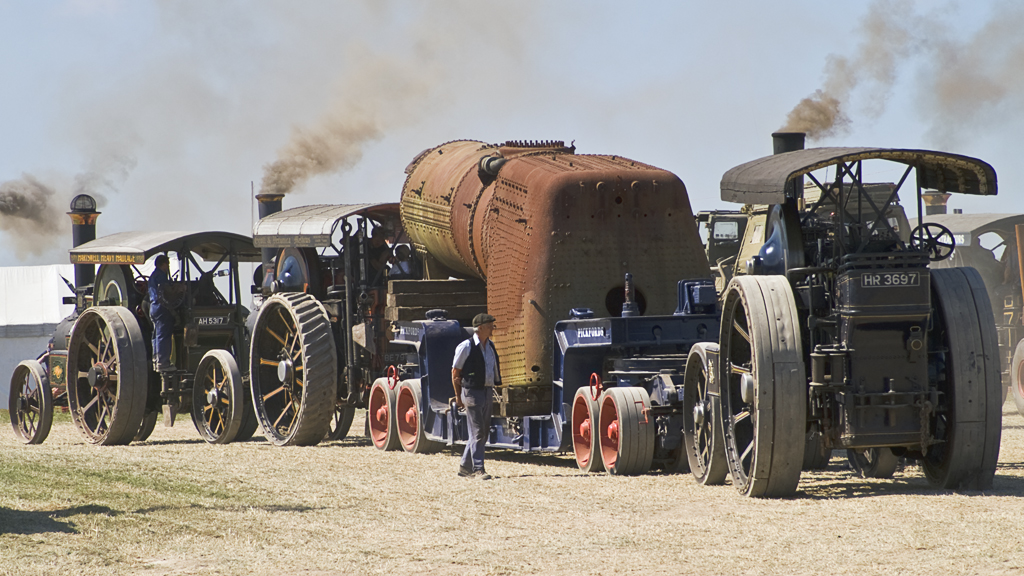
Steam traction heavy haulage

Designed for haulage of heavy loads on public highways, it was common for two or even three to be coupled together to allow heavier loads to be handled.

The characteristic features of these engines are very large rear driving wheels fitted with solid rubber tyres, three-speed gearing (most traction engine types have only two gears), rear suspension, and belly tanks to provide a greater range between the stops needed to replenish water. All these features are to improve the ride and performance of the engine, which were used for journeys of hundreds of miles. Most road locomotives are fitted with a winch drum on the back axle. This can be used by removing the driving pins from the rear wheels, allowing the drive train to power the winch drum instead of the wheels.

Boydell's wheel as implemented by Burrell

James Boydell worked with the British steam traction engine manufacturer Charles Burrell & Sons to produce road haulage engines from 1856 that used his dreadnaught wheels which were particularly suited to bad roads or off-road use.

One place where road locomotives found a significant amount of use was in hauling timber from where it was felled to timber yards. Once the timber had been moved to a road the road movements were carried out hauling the trunks on pole wagons. In France road locomotives were used to move mail in the 1880s.

A number of road locomotives are fitted with a crane boom on the front. The boom pivot is mounted on the front axle assembly and a small winch is mounted on an extension to the smokebox in front of the chimney, the cable passing over a sheave at the top of the boom arm. The winch is powered by bevel gears on a shaft driven directly from the engine, with some form of clutch providing raise/lower control. These road locomotives can be used to load a trailer as well as to haul it to a new location. They are often referred to as 'crane engines'.

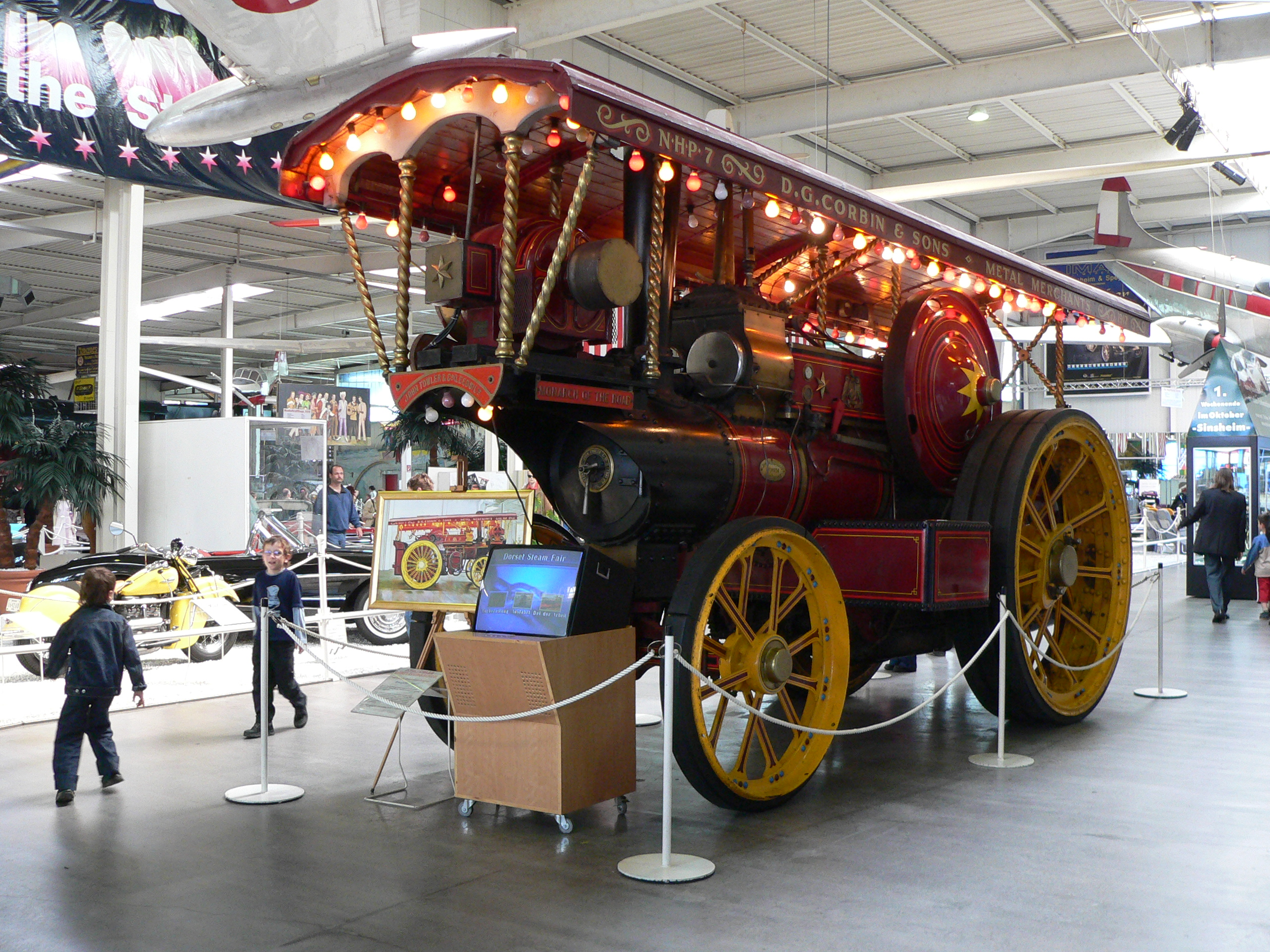
Fowler's Monarch of the Road showman's engine

A particularly distinctive form of road locomotive was the showman's engine. These were operated by travelling showmen both to tow fairground equipment and to power it when set up, either directly or by running a generator. These could be highly decorated and formed part of the spectacle of the fair. Some were fitted with a small crane that could be used when assembling the ride. About 400 were built with 107 surviving into preservation.

The poor state of the roads and the larger distances involved meant road locomotives (including showman's engines) were less used in the US.

==== History ====
In Britain the rise of the use of road locomotives was held back by high tolls charged by turnpike roads. The tolls were eventually limited by the Locomotive Act 1861. Four years later, the Locomotives Act 1865 was passed limiting engines to 4 mph and requiring that they preceded by a person carrying a red flag. The first traction engine focused on road haulage was offered for sale by Charles Burrell & Sons in 1856 and tyres were introduced around the same time. In 1896 the speed limit in the UK was raised to 6MPH and the red flag carrier requirement was dropped.

=== Steamroller ===
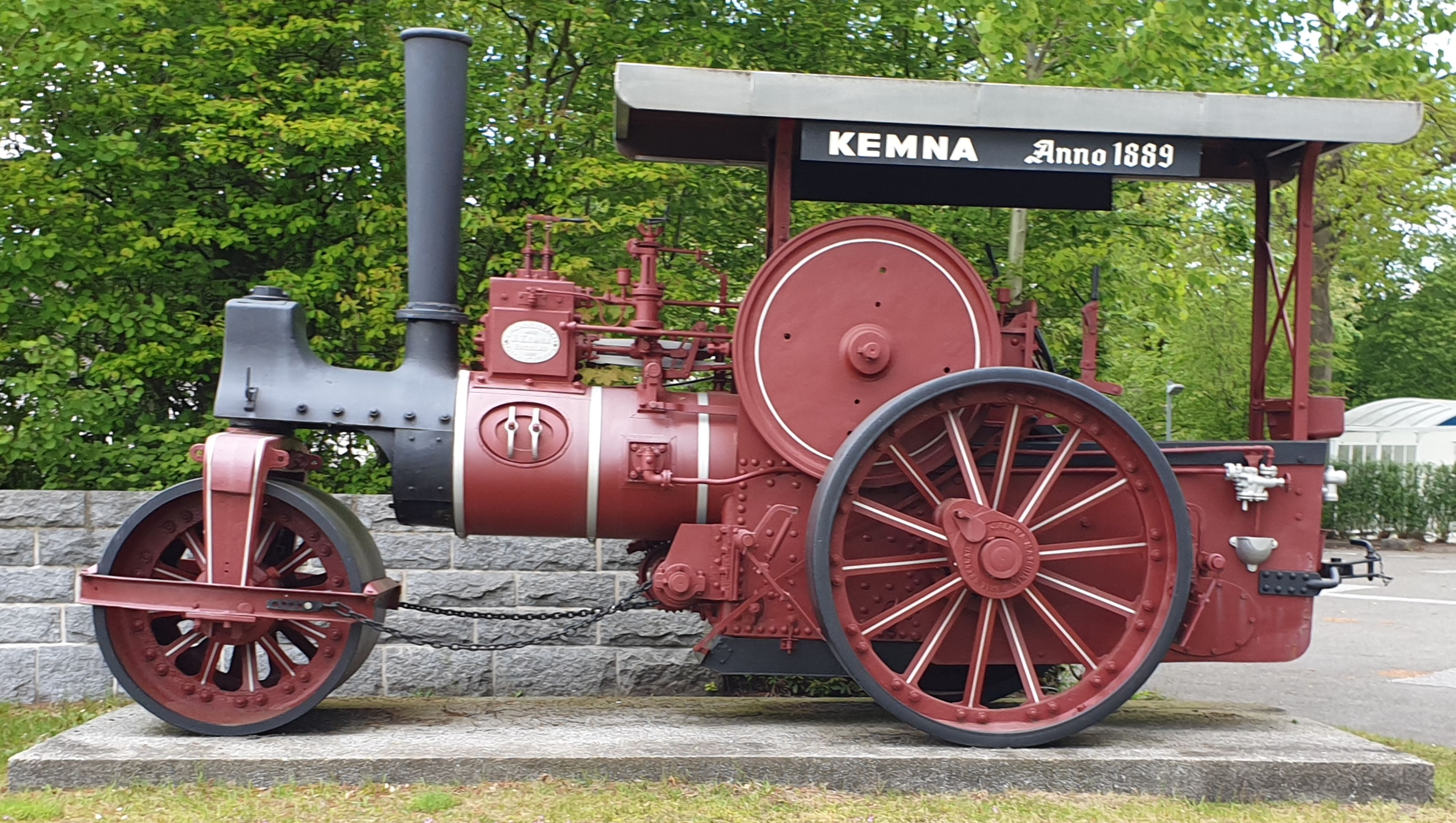
An early Kemna steamroller

Related to the steam traction engine, the steam roller was used for road building and flattening ground. They were typically designed with a single heavy roller (in practice, usually a pair of adjacent rollers) replacing the front wheels and axle, and smooth rear wheels without strakes.

Some traction engines were designed to be convertible: the same basic machine could be fitted with either standard treaded road wheels, or else smooth rolls – the changeover between the two being achieved in less than half a day.

== Relatives of the traction engine ==
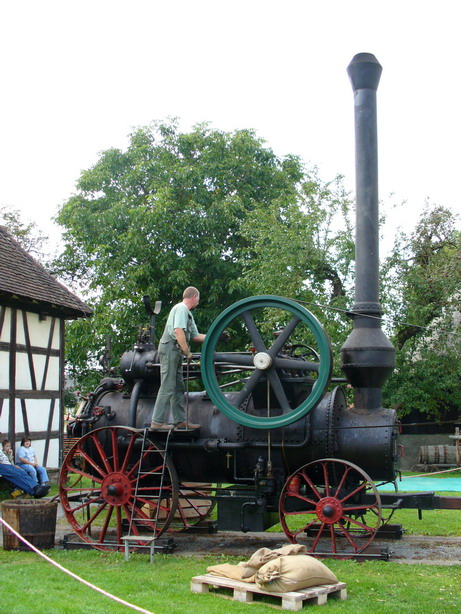
Portable engine showing the lack of self-driven wheels

A number of other steam-powered vehicles share design features with the traction engine, usually because the same technology was re-used in a new application.

=== Portable engine ===
A portable engine is a type of self-contained steam engine and boiler combination that may be moved from site to site. Although bearing a strong family resemblance, in both appearance and (stationary) operation, the portable engine is not classed as a traction engine as it is not self-propelled. However, it is included in this list because the traction engine is a direct descendant.

=== Steam wagon ===
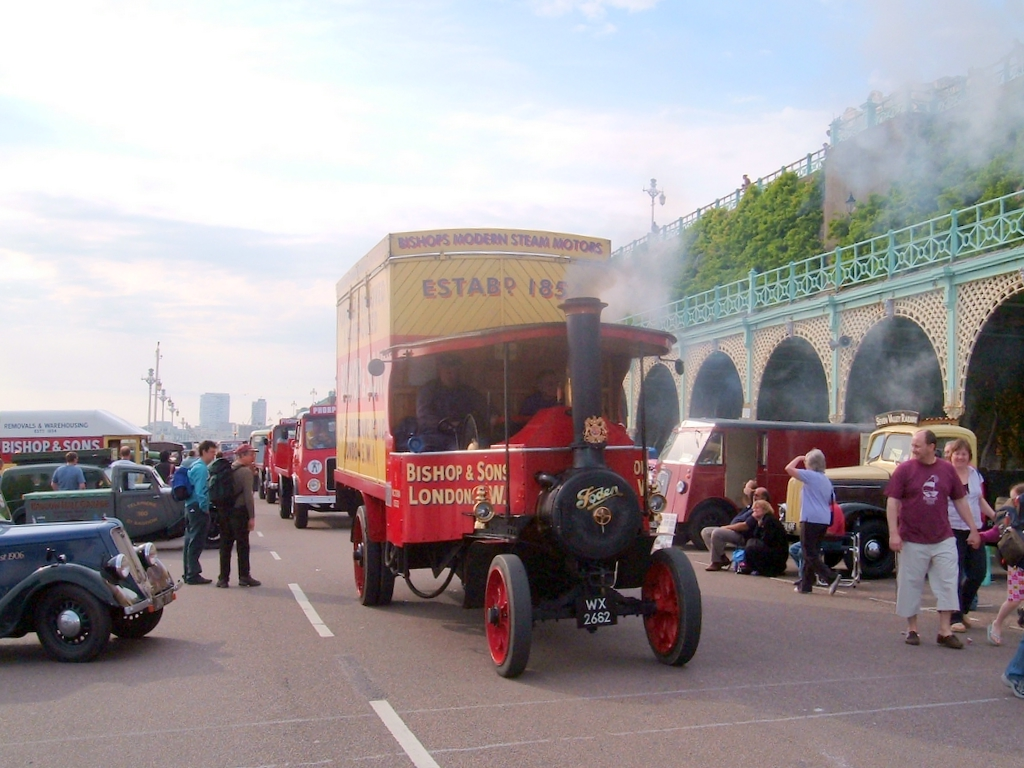
1930 Foden C-Type 5 ton 'overtype' steam wagon

A steam wagon is a steam-powered road vehicle for carrying freight. It was the earliest form of lorry (truck) and came in two basic forms: overtype and undertype – the distinction being the position of the engine relative to the boiler. Among the firms that specialized in them in the 1900s was the short-lived Invicta Works of Maidstone, owned by Jesse Ellis.

The overtype had a steam engine mounted on top of a fire-tube boiler, in a similar manner to a traction engine. The front of an overtype steam wagon bears a close family resemblance to traction engines, and manufacturers who made both may well have been able to use some common parts.

The undertype had the steam engine mounted under the boiler, usually between the frames of the chassis. The boiler was usually mounted well forward and was often a vertical and/or water tube type.

Steam wagons were the dominant form of powered road traction for commercial haulage in the early part of the twentieth century, although they were a largely British phenomenon, with few manufacturers outside Great Britain. Competition from internal-combustion-powered vehicles and adverse legislation meant that few remained in commercial use beyond the Second World War.

=== Railway traction engines ===
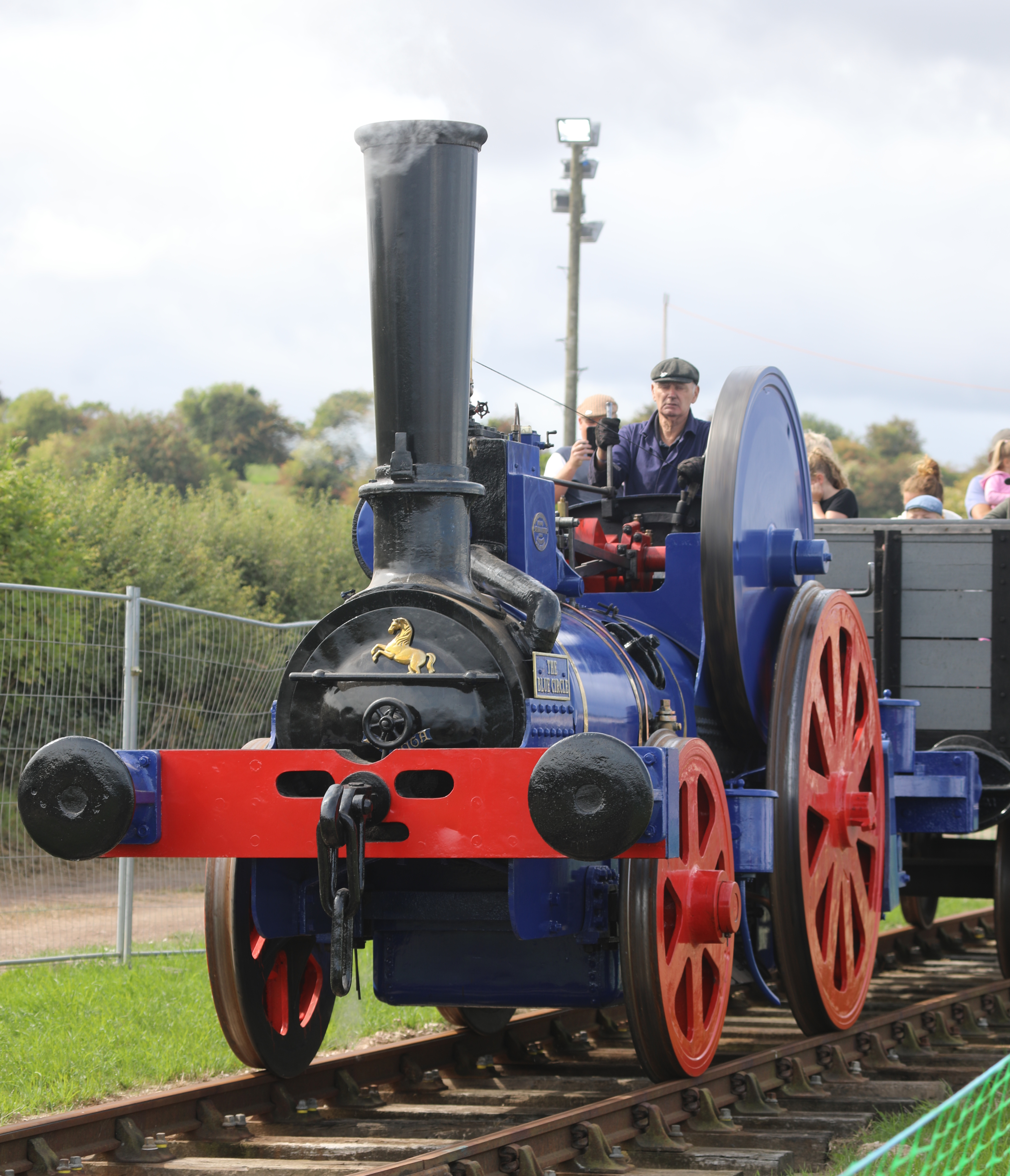
An Aveling and Porter traction engine-based railway locomotive, as used by Holborough Cement Co.

Several traction engine builders (such as Aveling and Porter and Fowler) built light railway locomotives based on their traction engines. In their crudest form these simply had flanged steel wheels to enable them to run on rails. More sophisticated models had the boiler and engine mounted on a chassis which carried railway-wagon style axles. The rear axle was driven from the engine by gear or chain-drive. These unusual locomotives were sold to small industries for use in shunting and marshalling duties, although they also found favour with engineering firms engaged in the construction of mainline railways for hauling men, equipment and materials over the partly constructed line.

== Terminology ==
- spud or lug – strip of angled metal that could be bolted to the driving wheels to provide greater traction on soft or heavy ground. Spuds were often required on ploughing engines when moving across farmland.
- strake – name for the diagonal strips cast into or rivetted onto the wheel rims to provide traction on unmade ground (similar to the tread on a pneumatic tyre).
- Nominal horse power – nhp is the typical way that traction engines are rated. One nhp is ten square inches of piston area but since this doesn't account for steam pressure or stroke length it has only a limited relationship with actual horsepower and mostly indicates engine size.

== Modern use ==
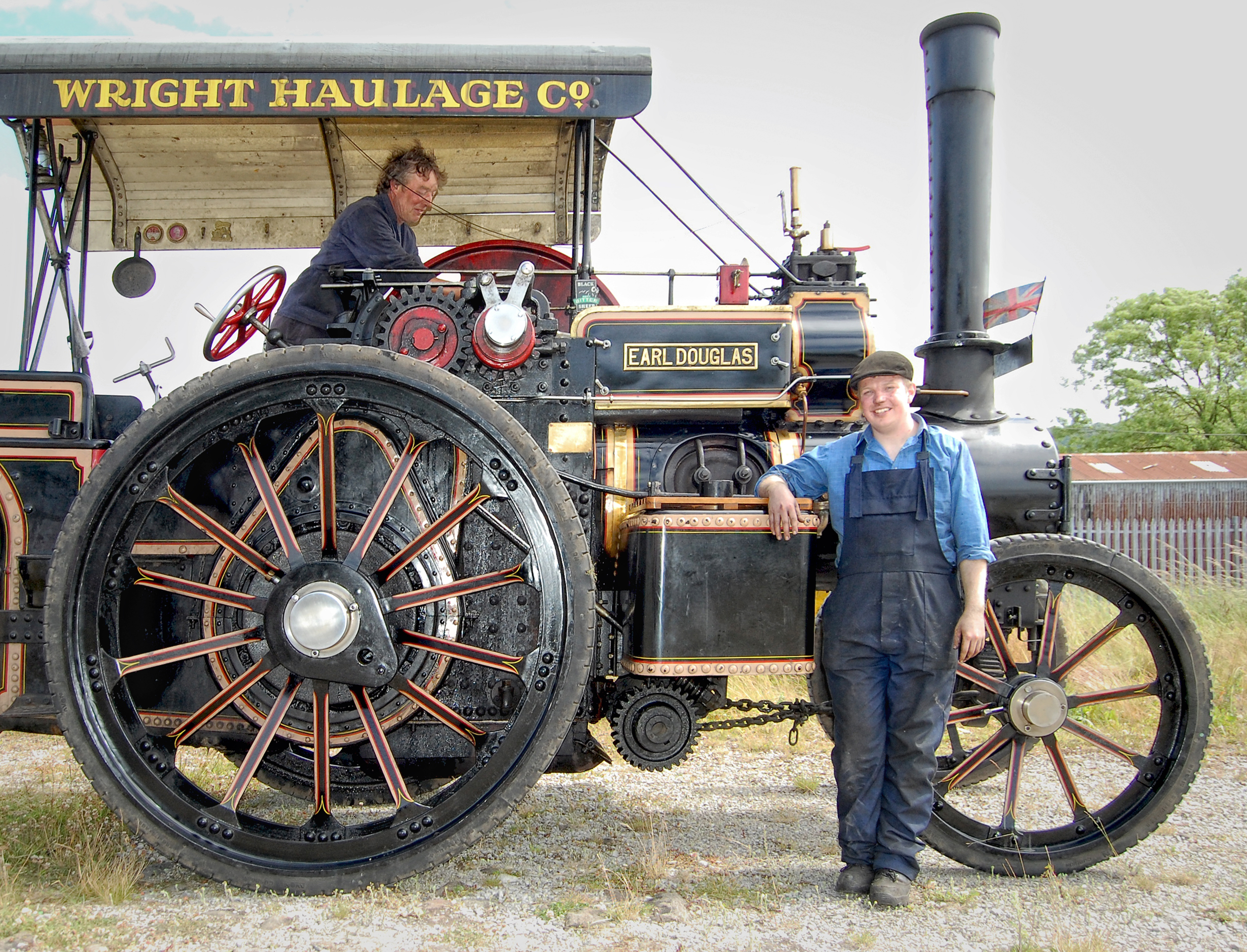
Two operators seen after taking part in a parade with their engine, Earl Douglas at Otley carnival in Yorkshire, England

Although no longer used commercially, traction engines of all types continue to be maintained and preserved by enthusiasts and are frequently exhibited at agricultural shows in Europe (particularly the UK), Canada and the United States. They are often a main attraction in a live steam festival (see List of steam fairs).

Model steam traction engines are manufactured by several companies, notably Mamod and Wilesco. Larger scale model engines are popular for model engineers to construct, either as a supplied kit of parts or machined from raw materials.

A small number of full size traction engines have been built in modern times. In 2018 an enthusiast group in the United States completed a new Case 150, built using original manufacturing documents.

== Traction engines in popular culture ==
In film

- The 1962 film The Iron Maiden featured a showman's engine as the film's star, along with many others, at the annual rally at Woburn Abbey.
- In the 2004 film Tremors 4: The Legend Begins, the people of Rejection, Nevada had a traction engine and were proud of it. During the final battle, two of the characters fired their guns from the traction engine, and the traction engine rammed and killed the last graboid.

In literature

- Trevor is one of the non-railway characters featured in The Railway Series of children's books by the Rev. W. Awdry. Appearing in several of the books, the traction engine was originally 'saved from scrap' by The Vicar of Wellsworth with the help of Edward the Blue Engine. Trevor has also appeared in a number of episodes in the TV spin-off Thomas & Friends. Another traction engine, Fergus the Railway Traction Engine, also appears in Thomas & Friends, but unlike Trevor, Fergus runs on rails instead of roads. Theo from Journey Beyond Sodor is based on a Brill Tramway No. 1.
- In the book Gumdrop and The Farmer's Friend, by Val Biro, the vintage motor-car Gumdrop is rescued from a snowy ditch by "The Farmer's Friend", a traction engine belonging to a local farmer. Some months later, the two vehicles are instrumental in thwarting a pair of car thieves.
  The end-papers of the book include a simplified cut-away drawing of the traction engine: a single-cylinder, 6 nhp Fowler light tractor built in 1903.
- Traction engines for road haulage feature prominently in Keith Roberts' alternate-history novel Pavane.
- In the 1960s, cutaway drawings of traction engines by Geoffrey Wheeler featured in Eagle comics and a Blue Peter annual.

On television

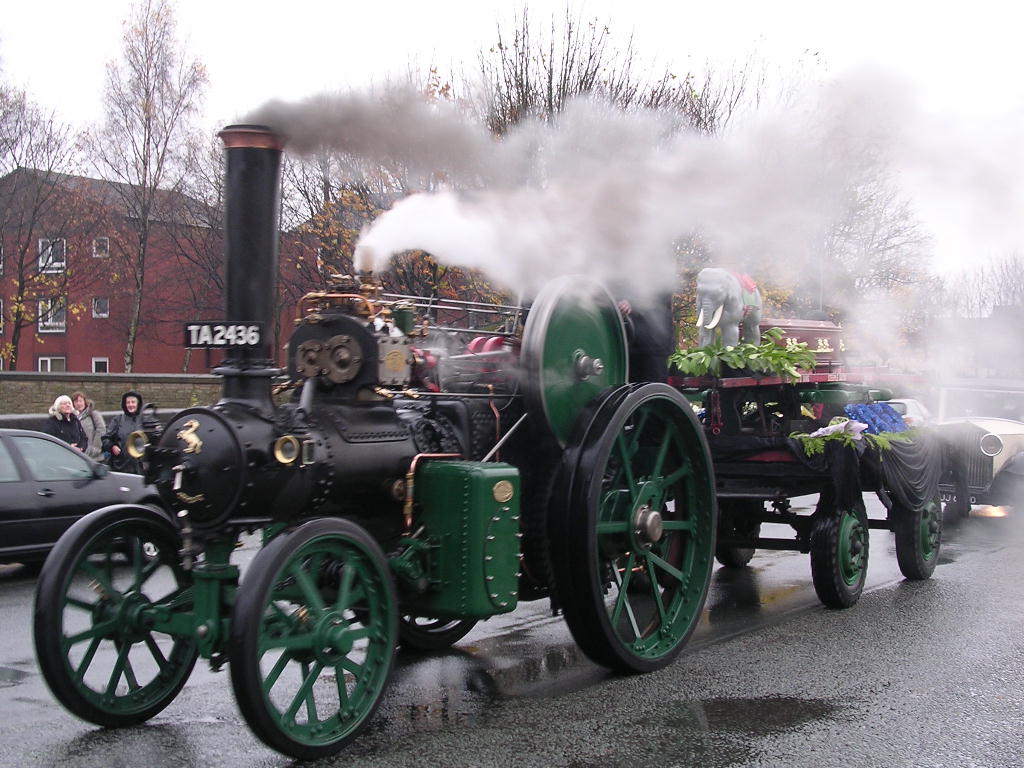
Fred Dibnah's funeral procession (November 2004), headed by Dibnah's 1912 Aveling & Porter

- Fred Dibnah of Bolton, England, was known as a National Institution in Great Britain for the conservation of old traction engines and other steam engines. His television series Fred Dibnah's Made in Britain shows him touring the United Kingdom in his rebuilt 10-ton traction engine.
- In the television play Threads, depicting the consequences of nuclear war in the United Kingdom, traction engines come back into use as petrol becomes unavailable.

== See also ==
- Farm equipment
- History of steam road vehicles
- Hollycombe Steam Collection
- List of steam fairs –
  where preserved traction engines may be seen in action
- Live steam
- Museum of English Rural Life (MERL) –
  UK national collection of history of farming
- Steam car
- Steam roller
- Steam shovel
- Steam tractor
- Steam tricycle
- Steam wagon
- Steam locomotive
- Stationary steam engine
