= Jesse Ellis =

Engineer and pioneer of steam wagons

At the Invicta works in 1903

Jesse Ellis (14 April 1846 – 17 October 1916) was an engineer and pioneer of steam wagons.

== Personal life ==
Ellis was born in Cranbrook, Kent, and moved with his parents to Pembury, where he was living at the age of 14. He married Mary Moseley. By 1881 they had six children and three servants and lived in Union Street, Maidstone. More children followed and they moved out to Barming, returning in 1901 to 68 London Road, Maidstone. He died in 1916 in Lambeth aged 70.

== Professional life ==
Ellis trained as an engineer with the Rochester, Kent, firm of Aveling and Porter, and then formed a partnership with Arthur Fremlin, trading as Jesse Ellis and Co. They were engineers and boiler makers, creating the Invicta Works, Maidstone, where they made a speciality of traction engines. He is probably best known for his steam motor-wagon with special fire-tube boilers, which Ellis personally introduced into Egypt in 1902.

Ellis was a founder member of the Royal Automobile Club in 1897 and a member of the Royal Agricultural Society of England. He was a founder and at the time of his death Vice President of the National Traction Engine and Owners' Association.

The firm exhibited at the International Motor Show, Olympia in 1905 and showed a steam vehicle at the Commercial Motor Vehicle and Boat Show at Olympia (London) in March 1907. However, Jesse Ellis & Co. Ltd went into liquidation on 30 April 1907 and its premises were advertised for sale. The company Jesse Ellis and Co., with partners Jesse Ellis and R. D. Crosby, was dissolved in 1910.
