= Headland (agriculture) =

Area at each end of a planted field

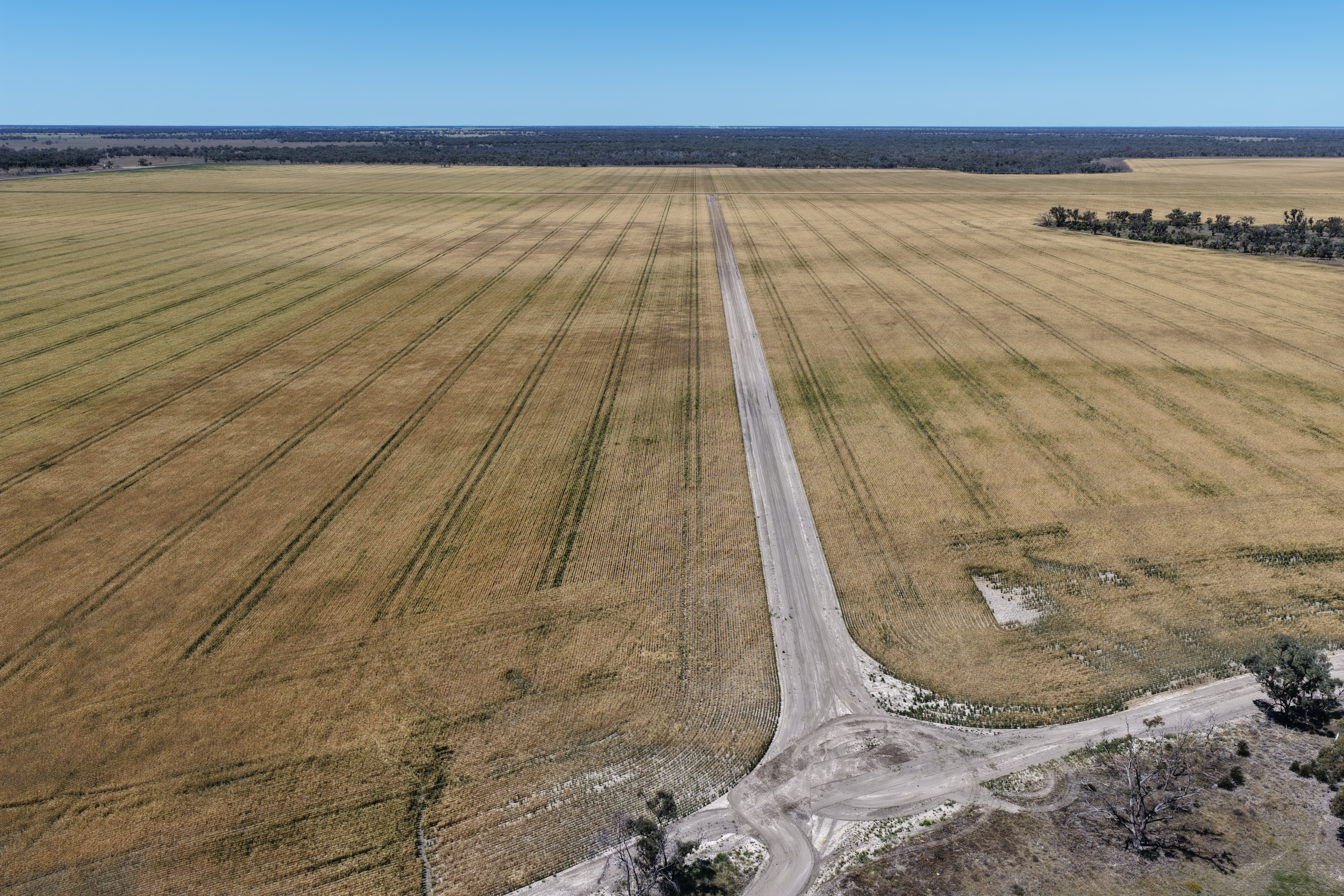
A drone photo of an Australian Wheat crop shows the main runs of the planter and the headlands.

A Headland, in agriculture, is the area at each end of a planted field. In some areas of the United States, this area is known as the Turnrow. It is used for turning around with farm implements during field operations and is the first area to be harvested to minimize crop damage. The rows run perpendicular to the lay of the field and are usually two, three or four times the width of the implement used for planting the field.

== Characteristics ==
The soil on headlands is subject to greater levels of soil compaction because it receives more traffic per unit of area than the field as a whole. Yields are generally lower than in the field itself due to additional implement traffic and crop damage from implements turning on them, as well as compaction. Soil fertility levels are frequently higher than in the main part of the field due to overlapping applications of fertilizer coupled with reduced yields.

== Steam ploughing ==
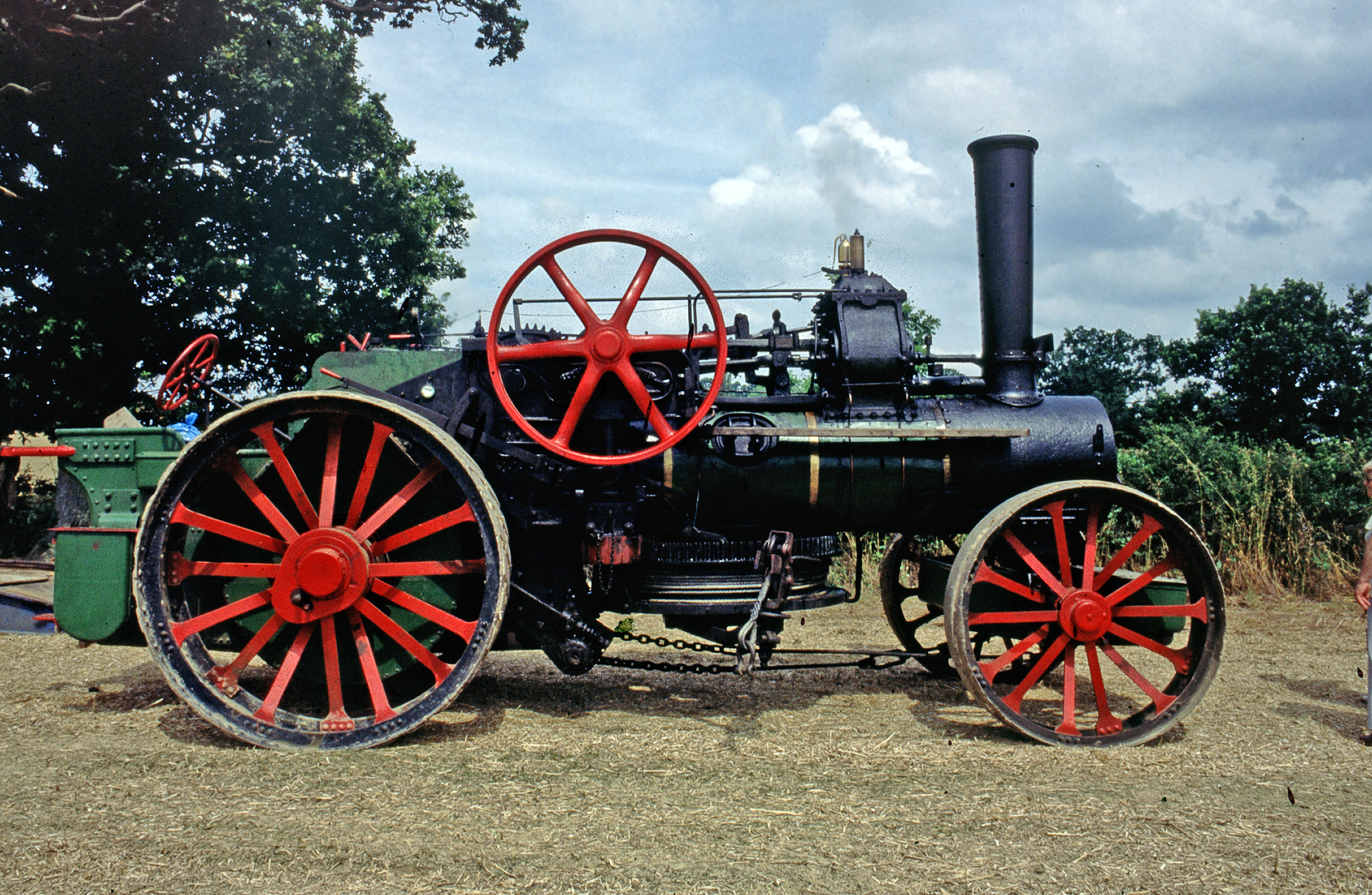
A steam ploughing engine

In the days when steam ploughing was common, the engine would often remain on the headland and pull the plough across the field by a wire rope. There would be severe compaction of the headland but little compaction of the rest of the field. There would usually be two engines, one on each headland, and they would winch the plough to and fro between them.
