= Russell & Company (manufacturer) =

Russell & Company of Massillon, Ohio

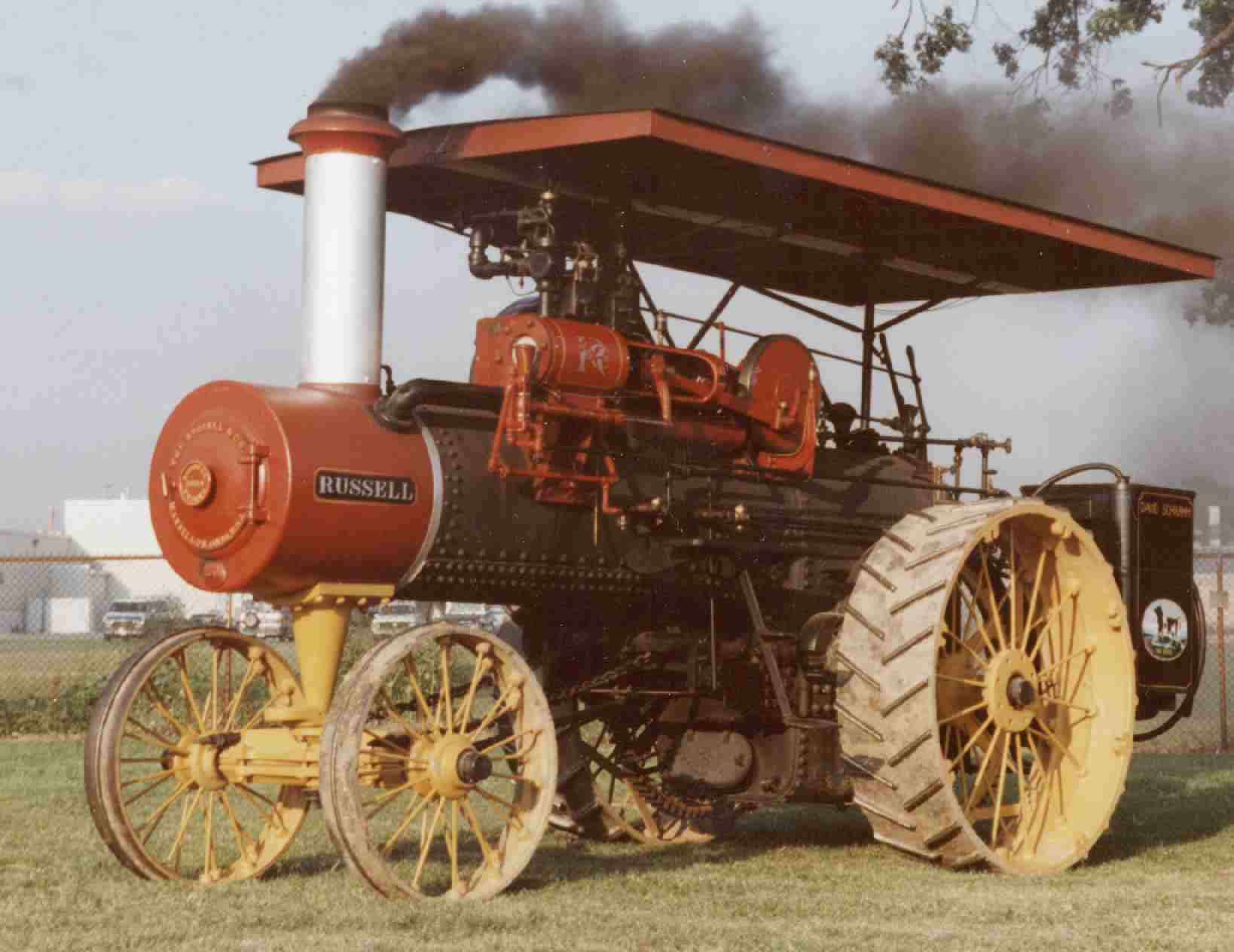
Russell & Company steam tractor

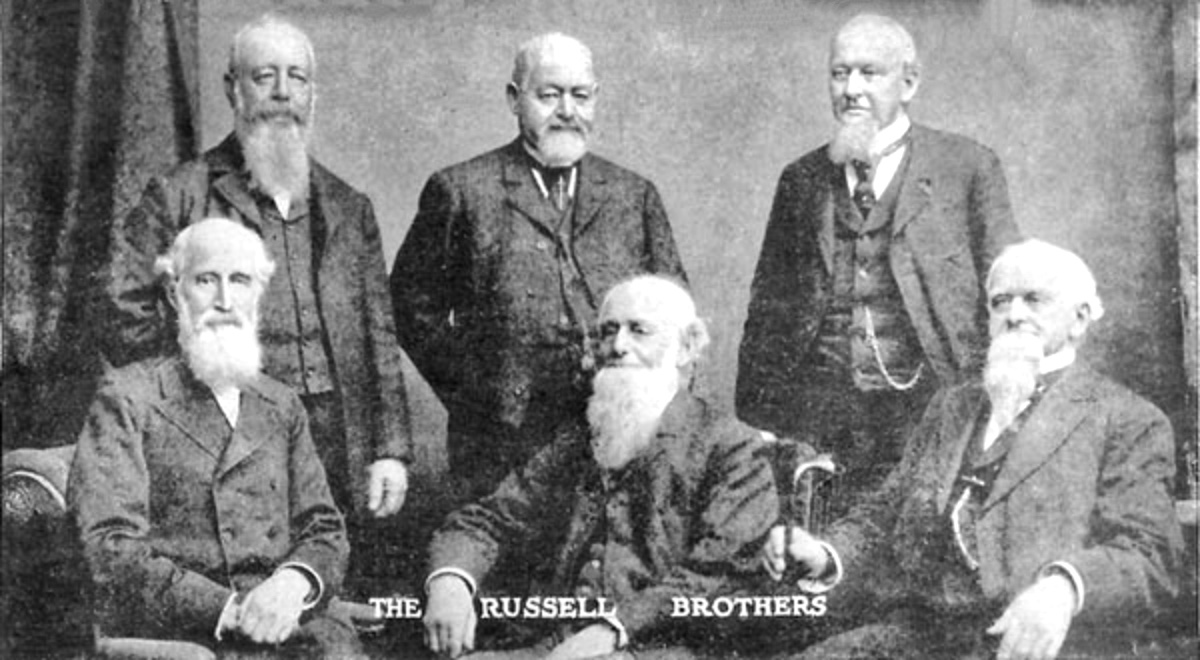
The Russell Brothers. Seated from left, Joseph (1823-1911), Nahum (1813-1891) and Clement (1817-1900); standing Thomas (1828-1893), George (1830-1894) and Allen ( )

Russell & Company of Massillon, Ohio, are best known for manufacturing farm and railroad machinery in the late 19th and early 20th centuries. They built 18,000 steam tractors and stationary engines and 22,000 threshing machines.

== History ==
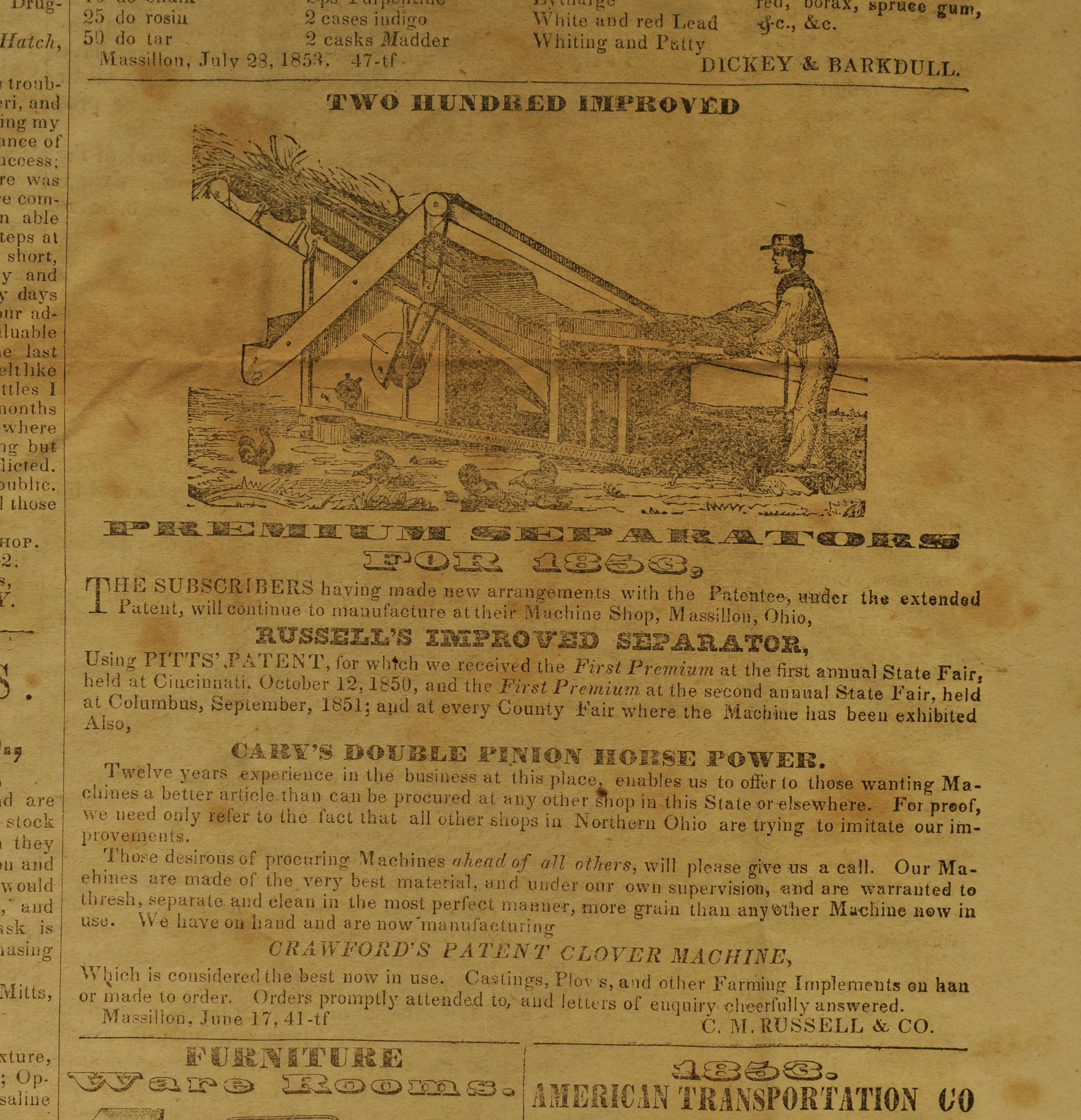
Russell 1853 Newspaper Ad for Russells' Improved Separator

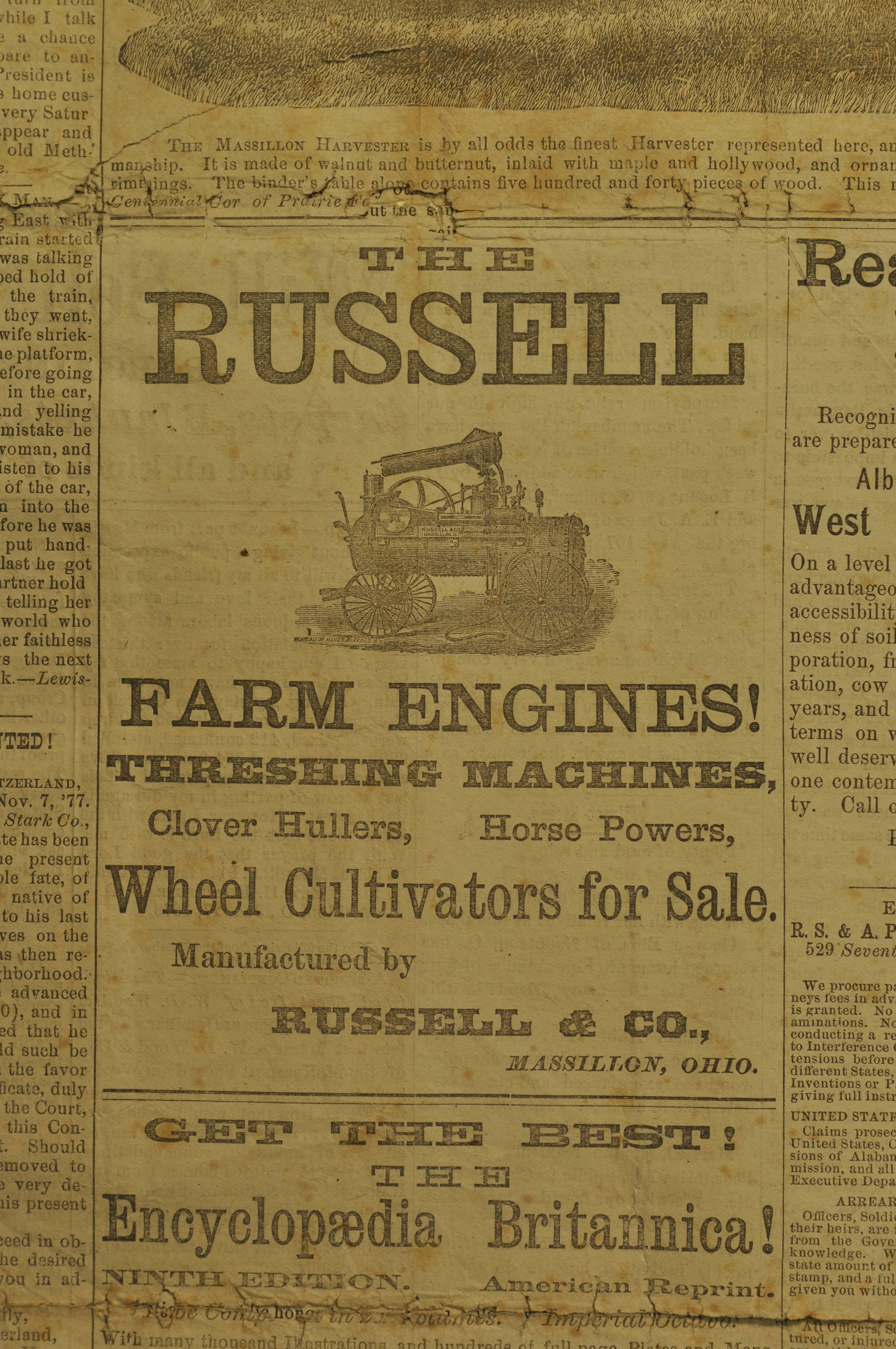
Russell Newspaper Ad for Farm Engines and Threshing Machines

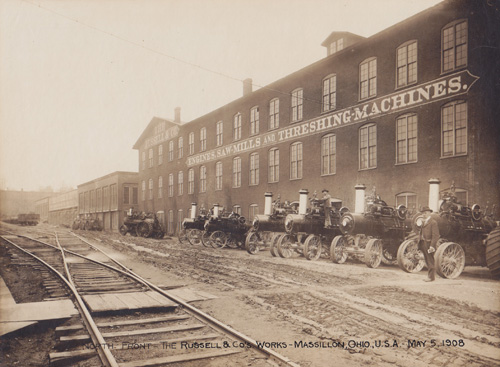
North front of Russell & Co Works, Massillon, Ohio, 1908. Banner states - Engines, Saw Mills and Threshing Machines

In 1838 Nahum and Clement Russell started a general carpentry business in Massillon, Ohio. They used a two-story frame building, and drove the machinery by horse-power. They made ploughs (plows) and agricultural implements, plus building houses, furniture, coffins, and more. The carpentry shop burned down in 1840.

Charles M, Nahum and Clement – formed C.M. Russell & Co. on Jan. 1, 1842, based in an old whitewashed building called the "White Shop". On seeing Hiram and John Pitts' Buffalo Pitts Separator (thresher) they understood its shortcomings such that their improved version took the honours at the Ohio State Fair at Columbus in 1845.

The Russells purchased stock in the Ohio & Pennsylvania Railroad, urged it to come through Massillon, and in 1852 they began producing handcars and stock cars for the railroad company. The business flourished, three more brothers joined and in 1864 it was incorporated as "Russell & Co".

In 1871 the company divided; C. Russell & Co. moved to Canton, Ohio to make agricultural reapers and mowers.

On May 17, 1878, a fire did $150,000 of damage to machinery, wagon stock and 36 years of patterns. Insurance covered only $53,100, a third of the total. Two-thirds of the main building was saved and new machinery was ordered, but 250 men were out of work. A new 250 foot long four-story brick warehouse was built.

Russell & Co reportedly started building steam traction engines after their 1878 incorporation, and by 1880, they employed 425 people on a seven acre site, with their own railroad sidetrack.

By 1884, they had become one of the largest producers of steam traction engines, plus building industrial, railroad and agricultural equipment.

By 1909, the 21-acre plant had produced 18,000 farm, traction and stationary engines, plus 22,000 threshing machines. They also made sawmills, pneumatic stackers, feeders and road rollers.

=== Merger and demise ===
By 1912, the company was in decline, and it merged with "Griscom-Spencer" Company of New Jersey. They created parts for Naval vessels during World War I, and earned an Army-Navy “E” for excellence during World War II.

In 1962, the company was purchased by Baldwin-Lima-Hamilton Company and the Massillon plant closed, laying off 800 employees).

== Products ==
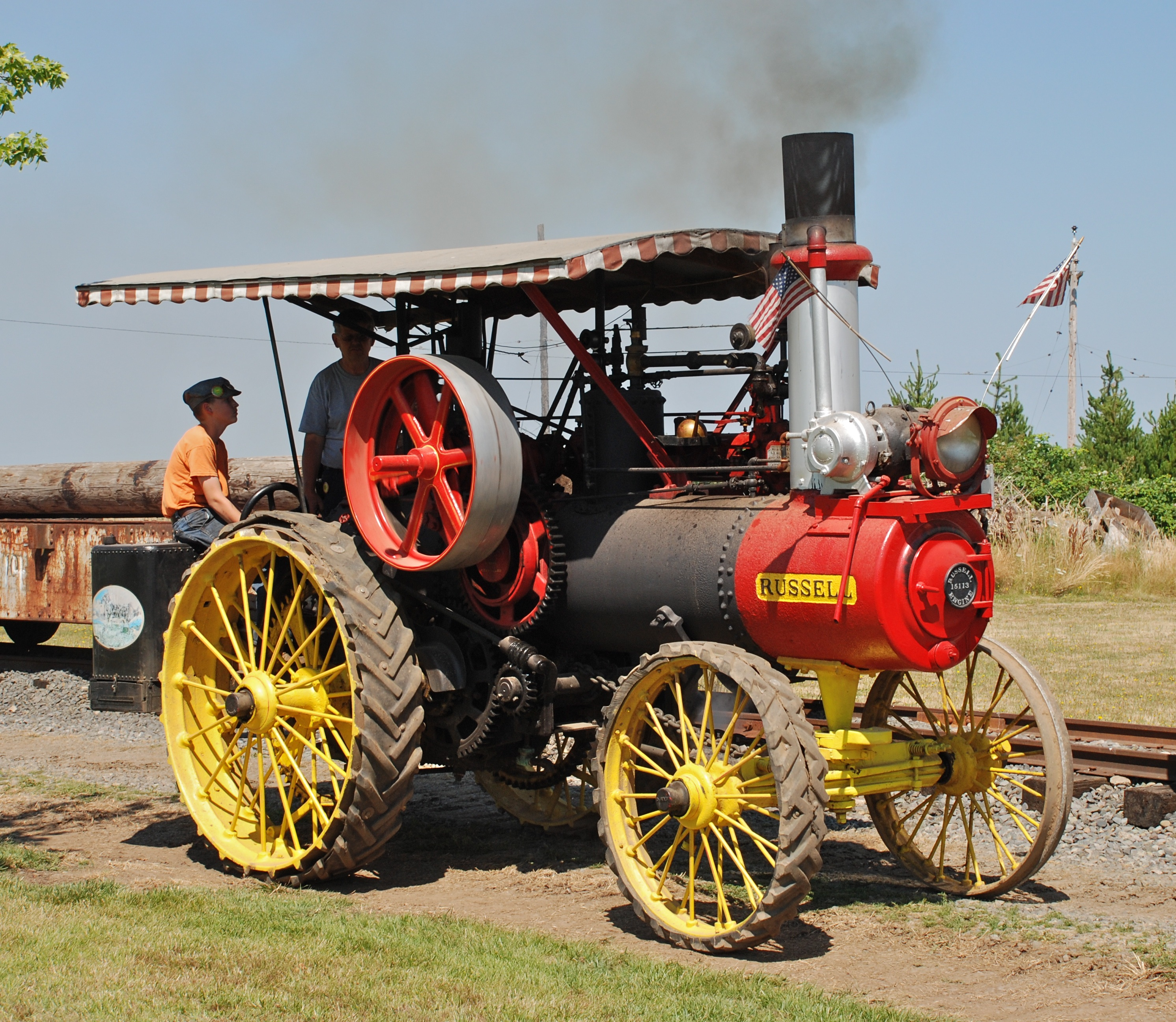
Russell steam tractor at 2010 Great Oregon Steam-Up

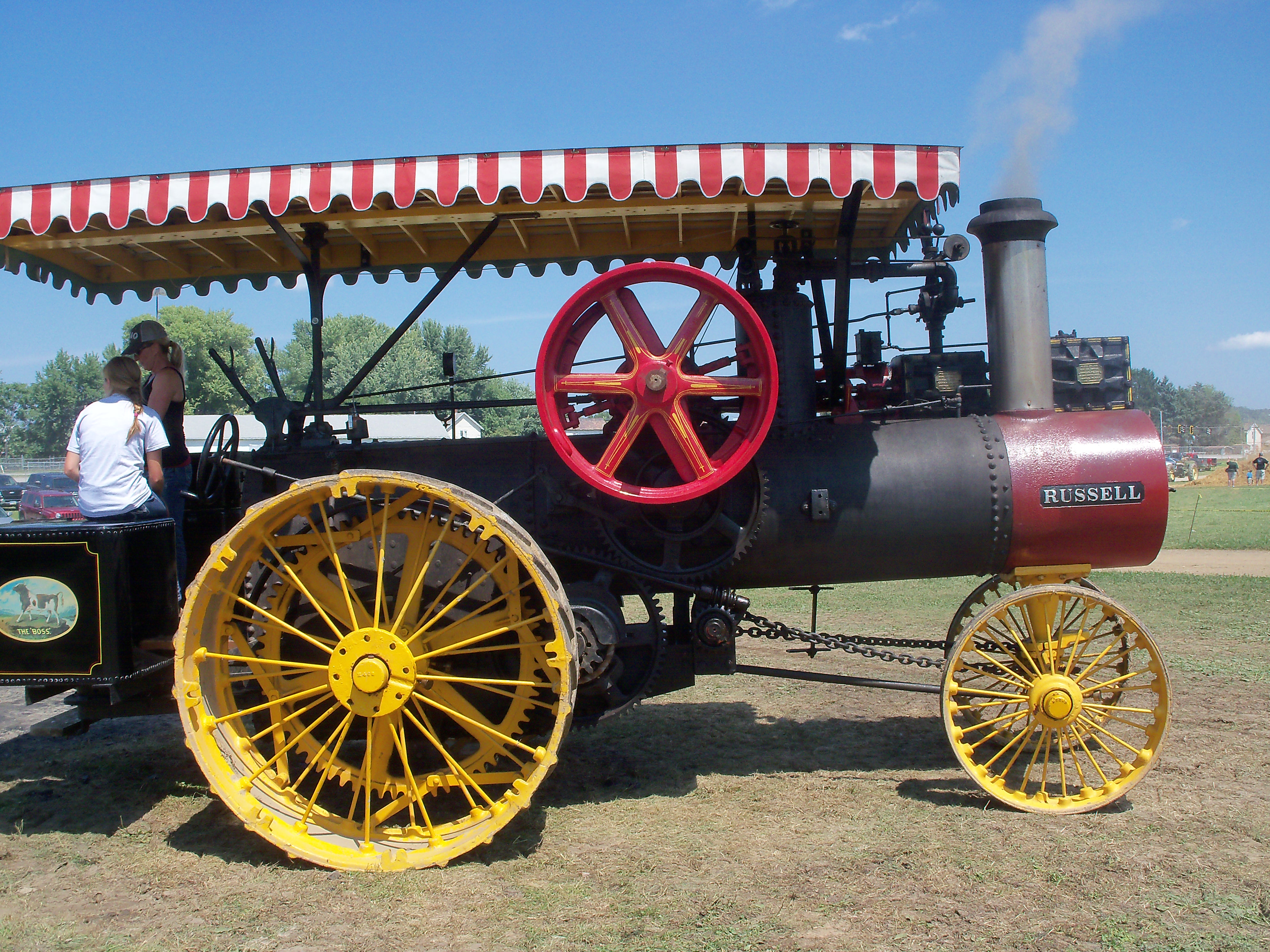
Russell & Co "The Boss"

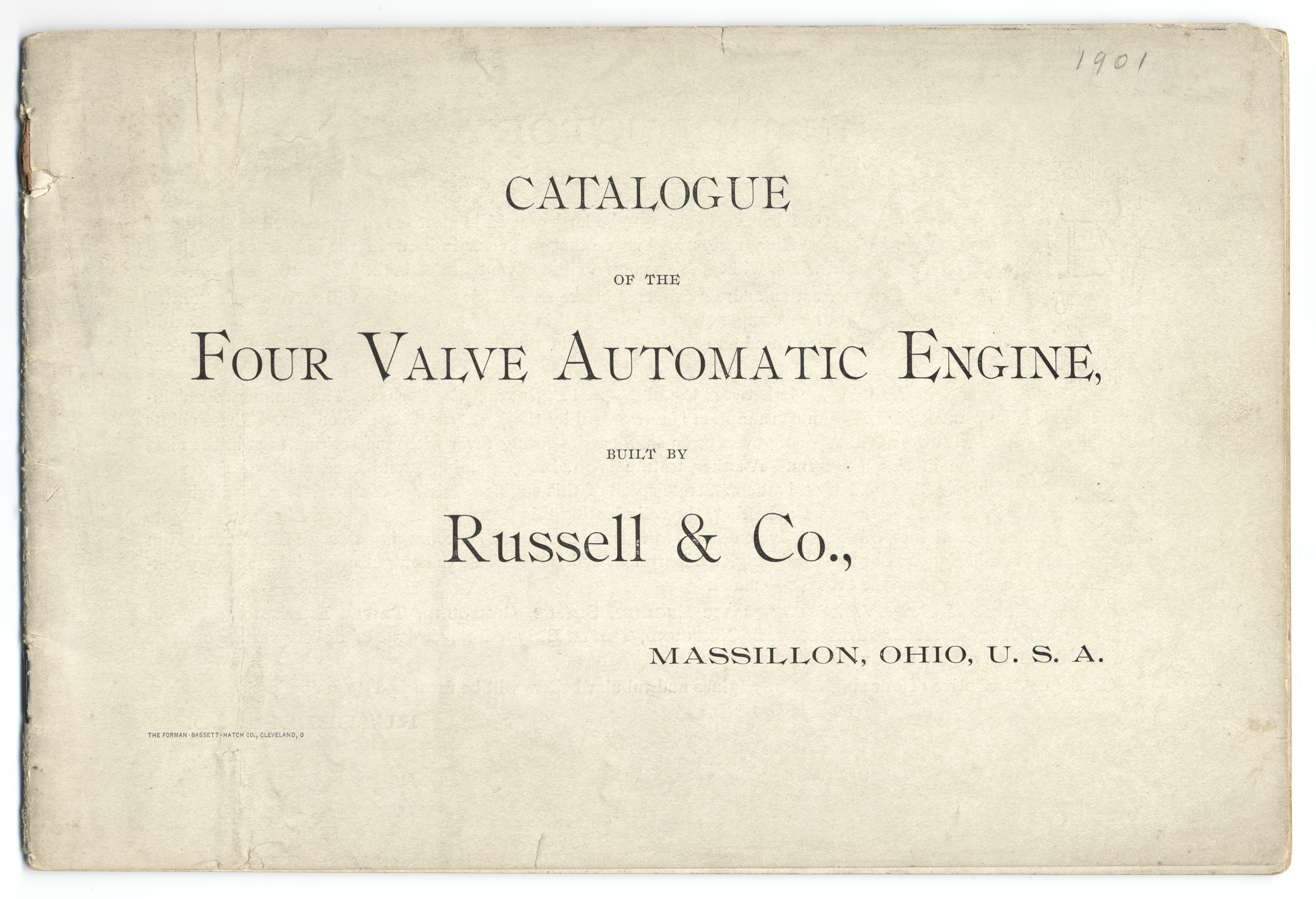
Russell catalogue, 1901

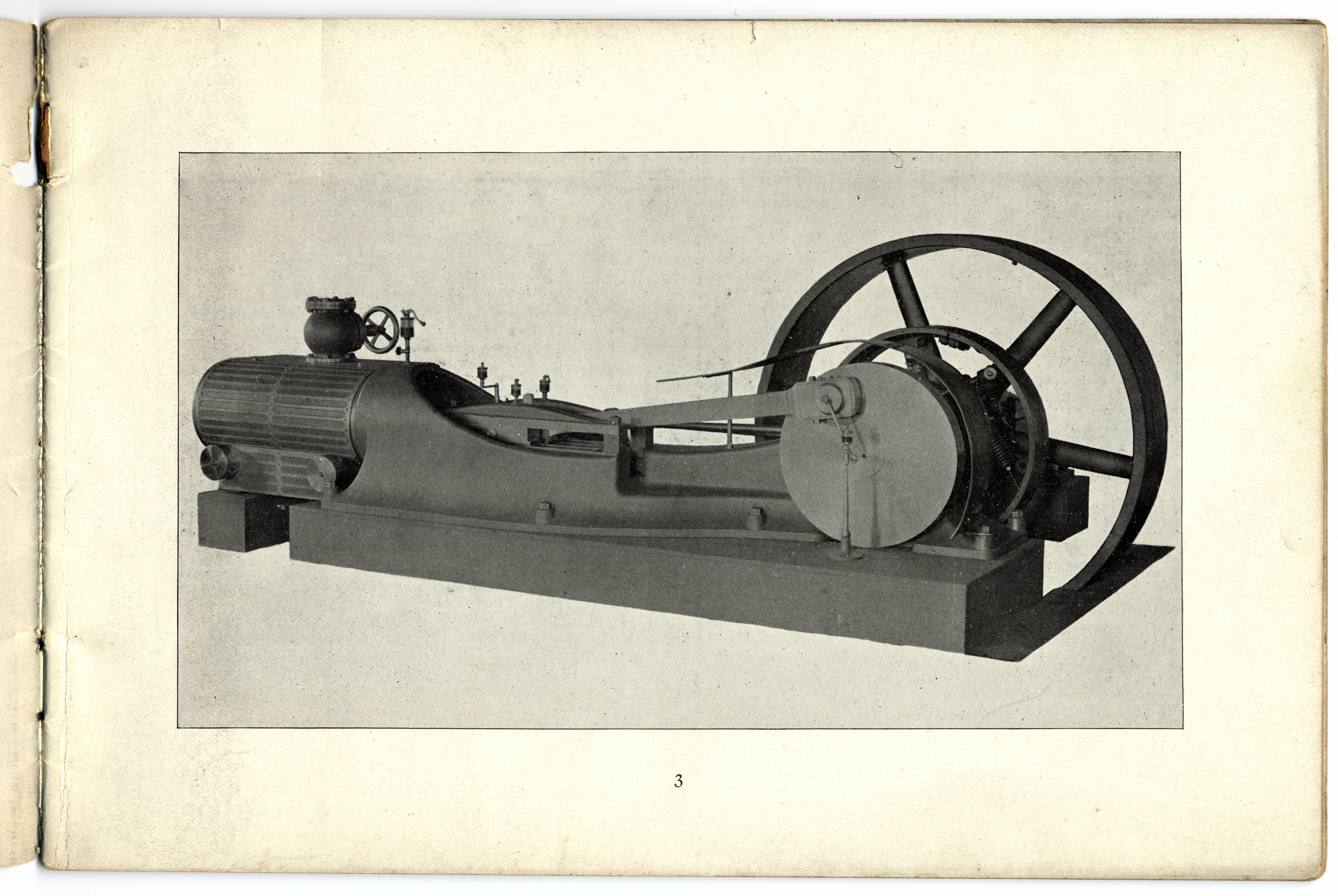
Four-valve engine, Russell, 1901

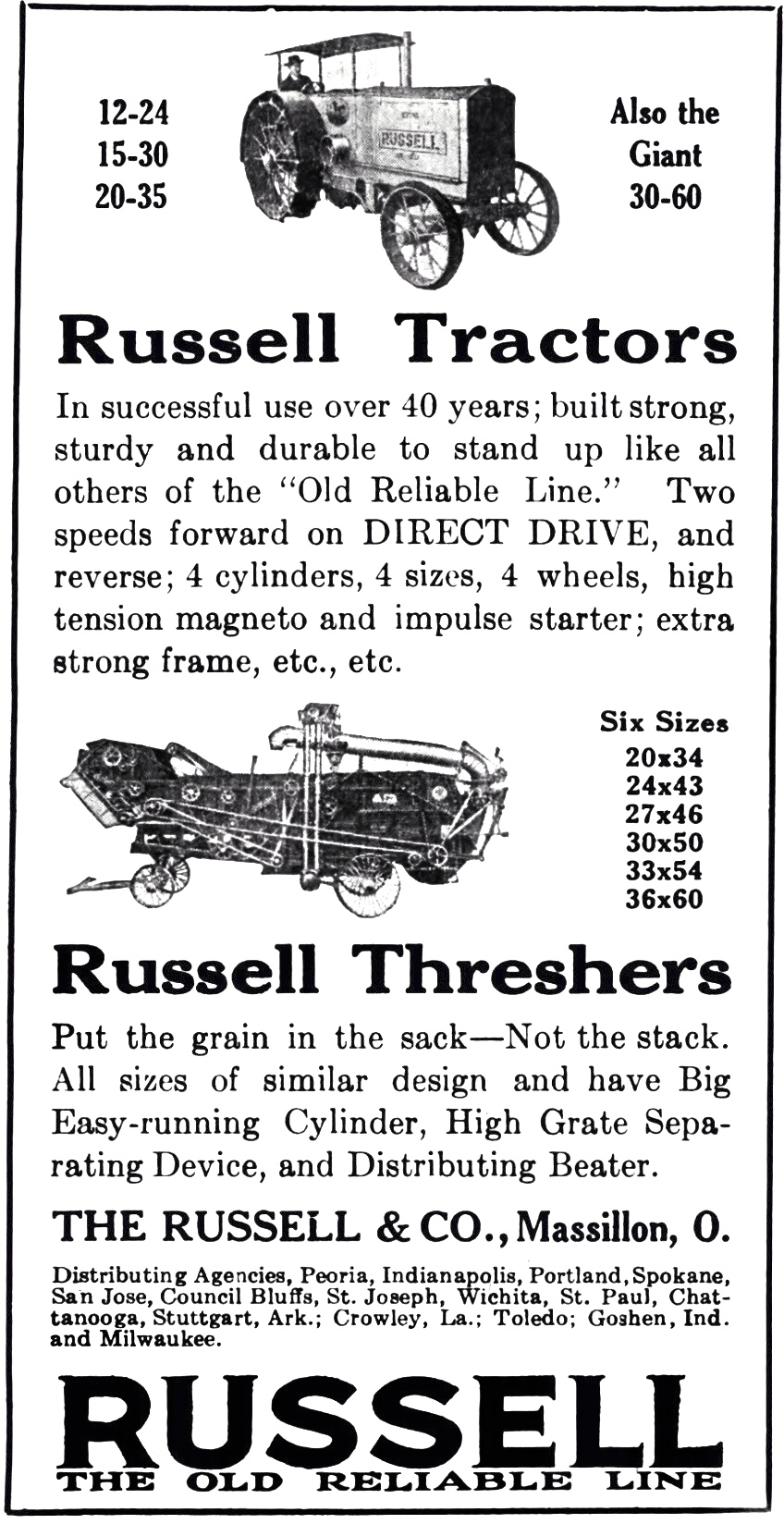
Russel advertisement (1921)

=== Steam Tractors ===
Russell steam traction engines ranged from 6 HP to 150 HP. Examples of all horsepower variations exist today, with the exception of a 150 HP engine.

- The 1887 6 HP Russell had self-adjusting piston rings, which would not require attention if properly lubricated.
- The 1887 10 HP Russells had a patented friction clutch, reverse gear, equilibrium valve and boiler.
- The 1891 10, 13 and 16 HP models, had throttle lever, brake lever, reverse lever, steam chest, cylinder cocks and rod operating the blower, all within reach from the footboard.
- The 1907 single-cylinder Russells were built with cylinder bore and stroke sizes of 6x8 inches, 7.5x10 inches, 8x10 inches, 8.25x12 inches, 9x13 inches and 10x13 inches. They burned coal or wood.

=== Steam roller ===
The first Russell steam roller was introduced about 1910, as a combination of a road roller and a hauling engine. The detachable rear wheel cleats enabled rolling use.

=== Static steam engines ===
The 1901 catalogue offered static engines for factory and machine shop work. Listed as 4-valve automatic engines.

=== Gas Tractors ===
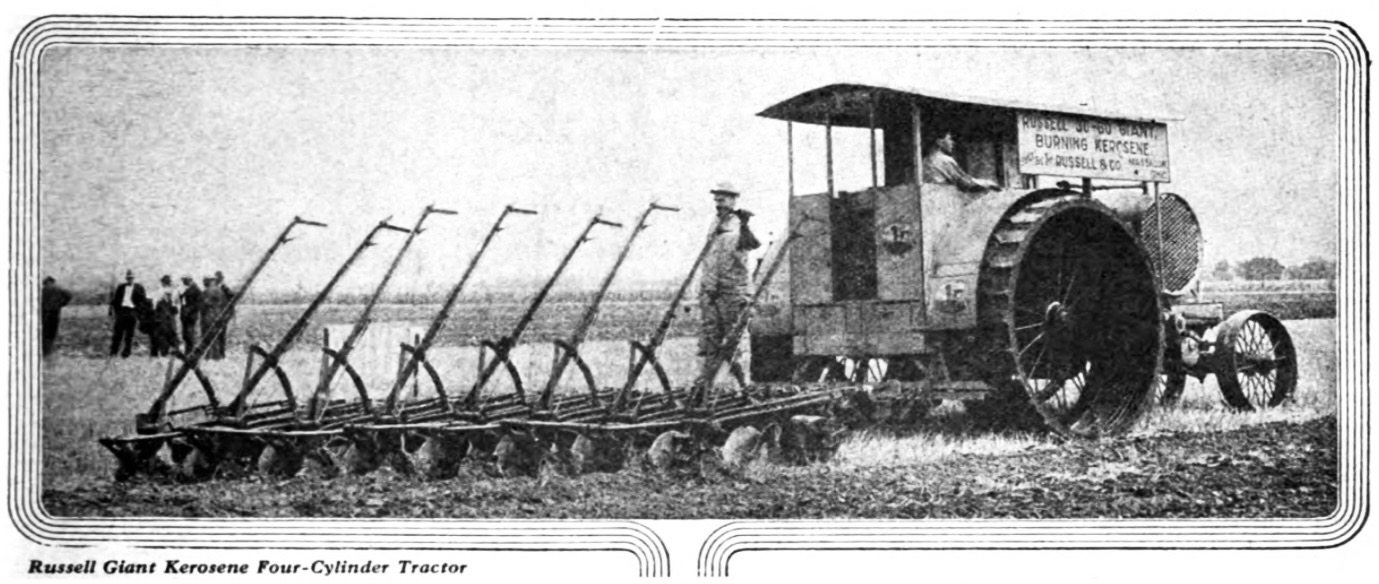
Russel 30-60 Giant (1910-1924)

In the year 1921, the following tractors were available for purchase.

- Russel 12-24
- Russel 15-30
- Russel 20-35
- Russel 30-60 Giant

== See also ==
- Oliver Farm Equipment Company
- Nichols and Shepard
