= Lübbert =

Lübbert or Luebbert is a surname. Notable people with the surname include:

- Eduard Lübbert (1830–1889), German classical philologist
- Friedrich Lübbert (1818–1882), German composer
- Orlando Lübbert (born 1945), Chilean screenwriter and film director
- Óscar Luebbert (born 1956), Mexican politician
