= Kemna Bau =

German construction company

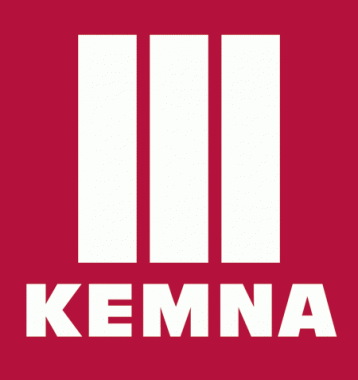
Logo

KEMNA BAU Andreae GmbH & Co. KG is one of the largest German construction companies and the largest street infrastructure provider in Germany with its headquarters inside the country. The company was originally founded under the name of J.Kemna/Breslau and was a Steam engine, steam tractor, locomotive, steam plow, road roller and tractor factory in Wroclaw, part of Germany until 1945.

== History ==
=== J. Kemna – Breslau ===
The company founder Julius Kemna originally came from Barmen, where he was born in 1837. In 1867 he started his business in Breslau (Silesia), which initially produced agricultural machinery. He worked with Fowler at times, but soon decided to build his own locomotives and steam plows. Following the example of Fowler, Kemna also built single-cylinder saturated steam engines, but soon recognized the advantages of high-pressure steam technology with superheated steam technology with compound or composite design, capable of significantly higher outputs with less consumption of heating material and water. With a keen sense for future developments, Kemna had recognized that the steam engine was not only revolutionary for industry, but also in agriculture and road construction. Julius Kemna died in 1898 and bequeathed 30 marks to his employees for each year of employment; enough money for many to build a house. In 1908 Kemna Bau presented a further development of the compound system: a superheated steam plow locomotive with overpowered steam and two high-pressure cylinders.

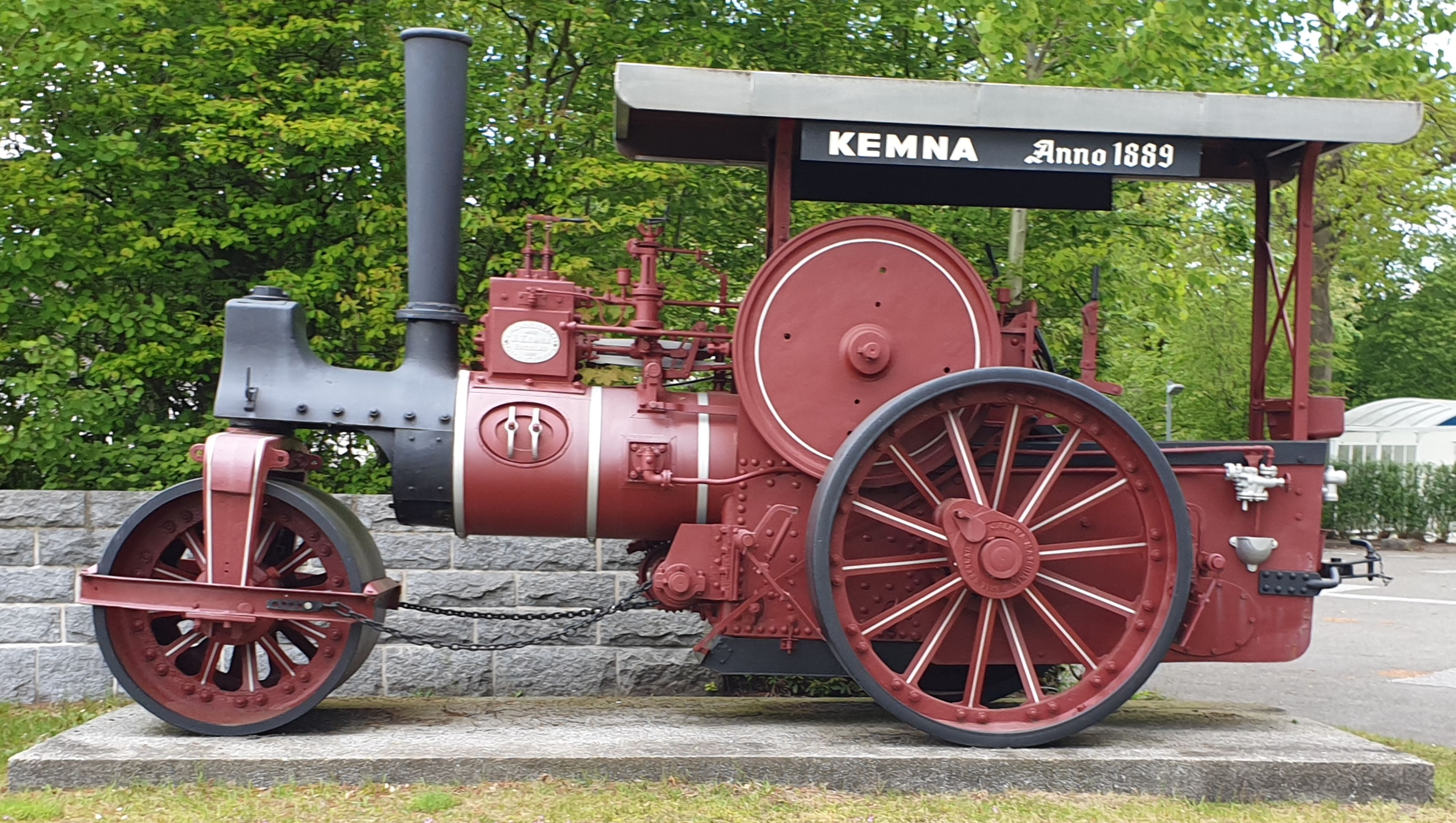
A Kemna road roller

=== 20th century ===
At the beginning of the 20th century, Julius Kemna became the "leading steam plow company on the European continent and entered the monopoly of English companies on the world market". The company developed into a "large industrial enterprise" around the turn of the century. Due to capacity expansions in 1905, approximately 900 employees were employed on a 52,000 m^{2} industrial site.

The First World War led the army management's demand that tractors be standardized across manufacturers to cope with the spare parts problem. Kemna thus introduced the road locomotive EM (unit engine), which was soon recreated by various manufacturers in the German Empire. Many of these machines were delivered to Europe as reparations for the First World War.

In 1919 Kemna advertised with its steam trucks, which were street locomotives with two trailers that were able to "transport 300 to 400 hundredweights with a range of up to 30 kilometers at a speed of 5 to 10 km / h". The traditional Steam plowing systems where two locomotives pulled the plow back and forth where gradually replaced in the 1920s by oil tractors independent of coal and water. The company adjusted to this market situation by relocating production. In 1923, Kemna's company was the first company in Germany to launch a road roller with a crude oil engine (Deutz-Diesel engine).Kemna, Julius – Deutsche Biographie

Kemna offered threshing machines and other equipment under the Wratislawia brand. After the First World War, Kemna also manufactured tractors with an internal combustion engine. Kemna road rollers were known throughout Europe. After the entry of Julius Kemna's son Erich Kemna into the company, Kemna focussed primarily on road construction. An asphalt mixture was created for this purpose in 1910. The location for the road construction division was relocated to Berlin.Kemna, Julius – Deutsche Biographie

The Wroclaw plant was completely destroyed in the Second World War. Due to the transfer of territory from Silesia to Poland, the J. Kemna plant was closed in 1945. After 1945, construction machinery, loaders and rollers were manufactured in Poland under the company FADROMA Wroclaw.

Three Kemna machines can still be viewed in museums in Sinsheim and Berlin as well as in the Polish National Museum of Agriculture near Poznan, another is freely accessible in the village of Veitsch in Styria (Austria).

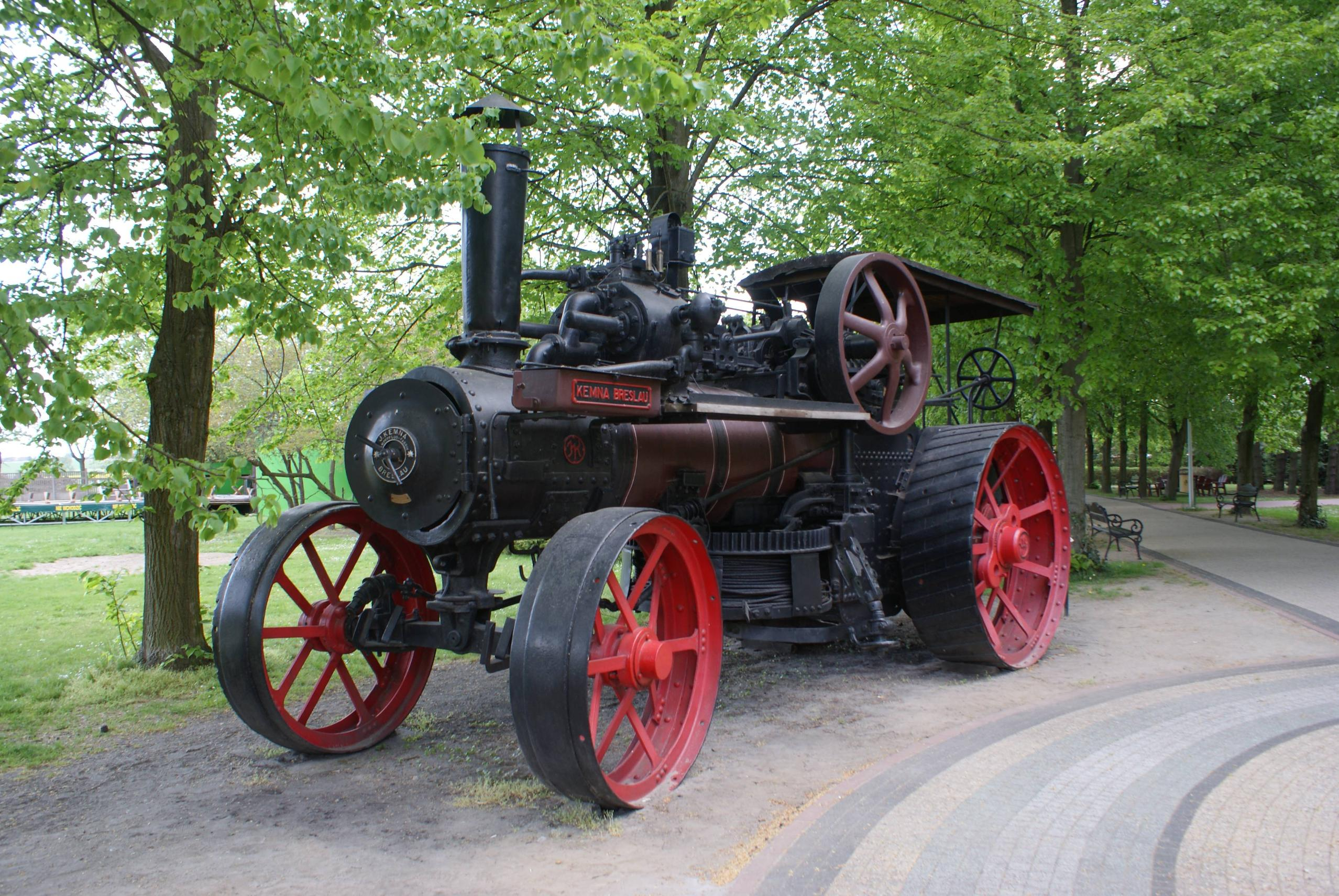
A Steam-ploughing engine

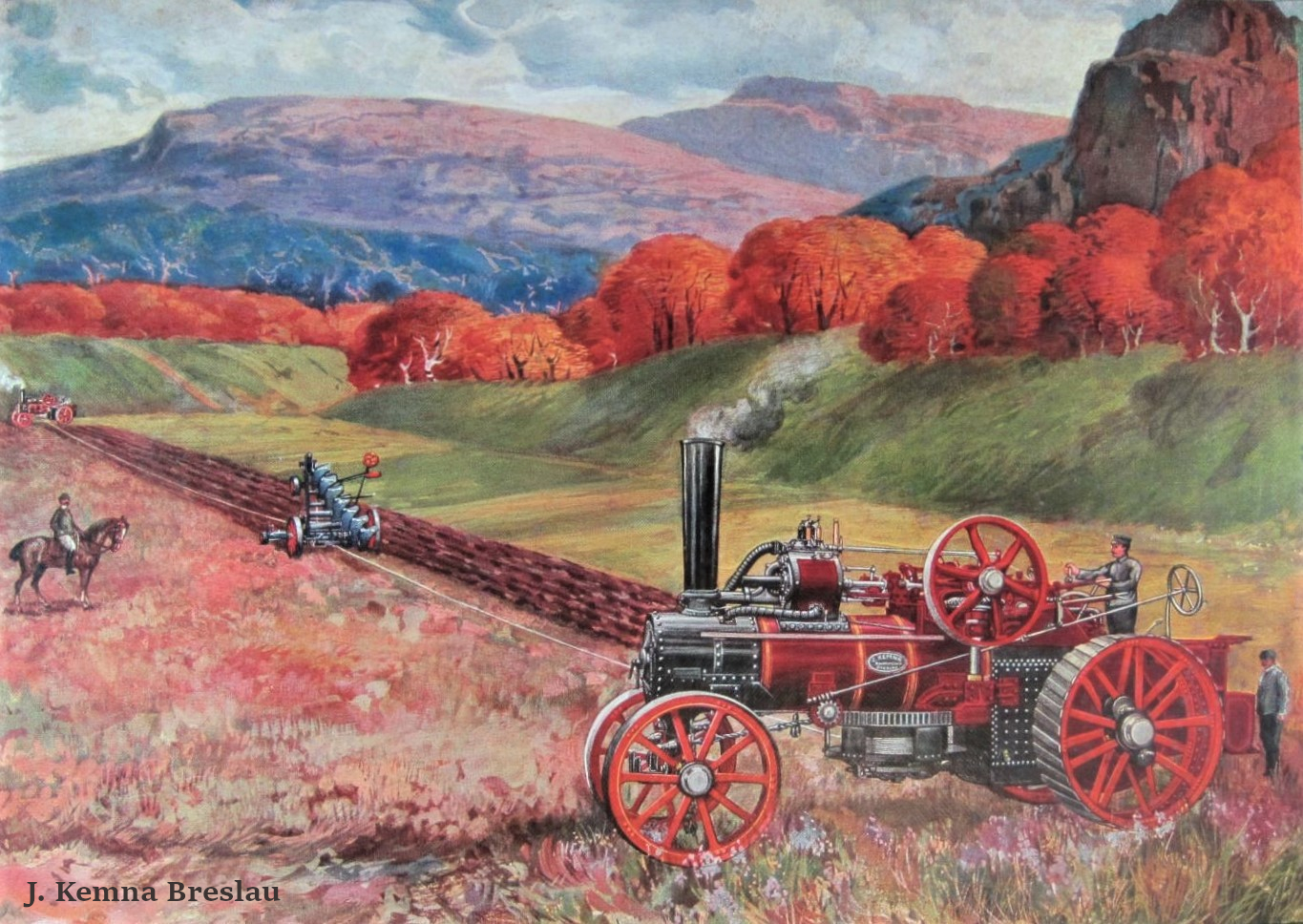
Kemna produced agricultural machinery up to World War 2 (as can be seen in this watercolor depicting a Kemna plow).

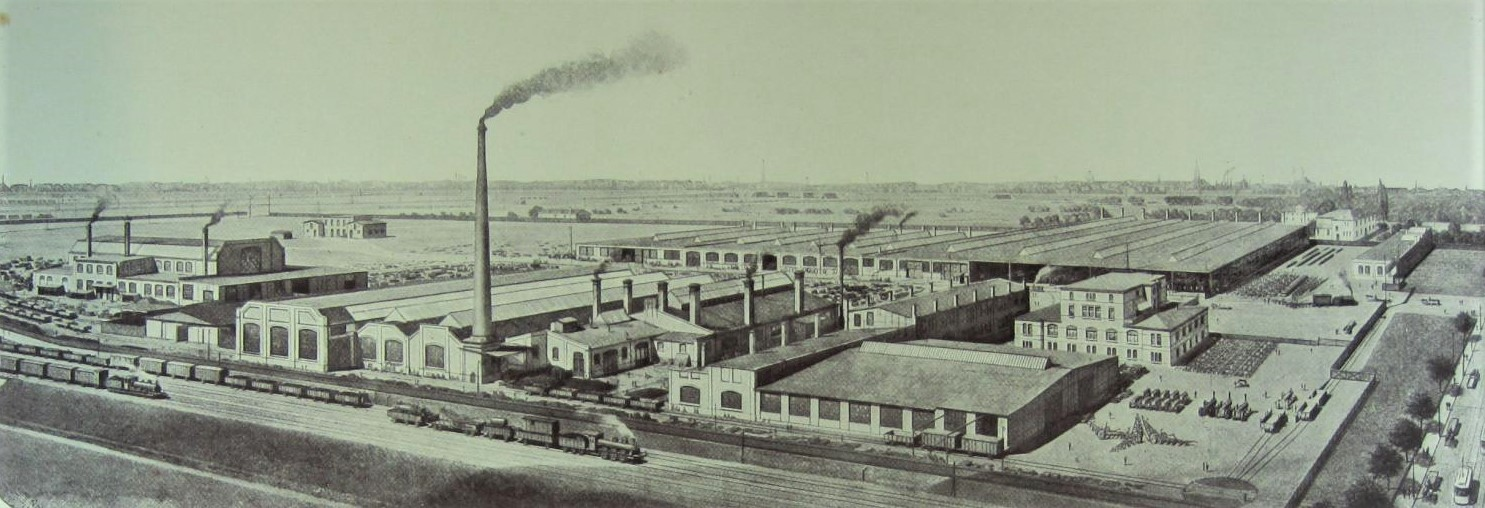
Kemna factory in Breslau

=== Kemna after World War 2 ===
After WW2, the company reformed, with little to no connection to its predecessor. The road construction segment of Kemna in Berlin was under the control of the Allied powers, which is why the Kemna Baugesellschaft GmbH was founded in Hamburg from a previously rather insignificant branch. After the end of the Allied control, the Berlin operation was reintegrated. Mastic asphalt was again offered and procedures for rationalizing road construction were also developed. Production units were purchased from around Germany and the company grew at a steady pace.

== Kemna Bau Andreae today ==
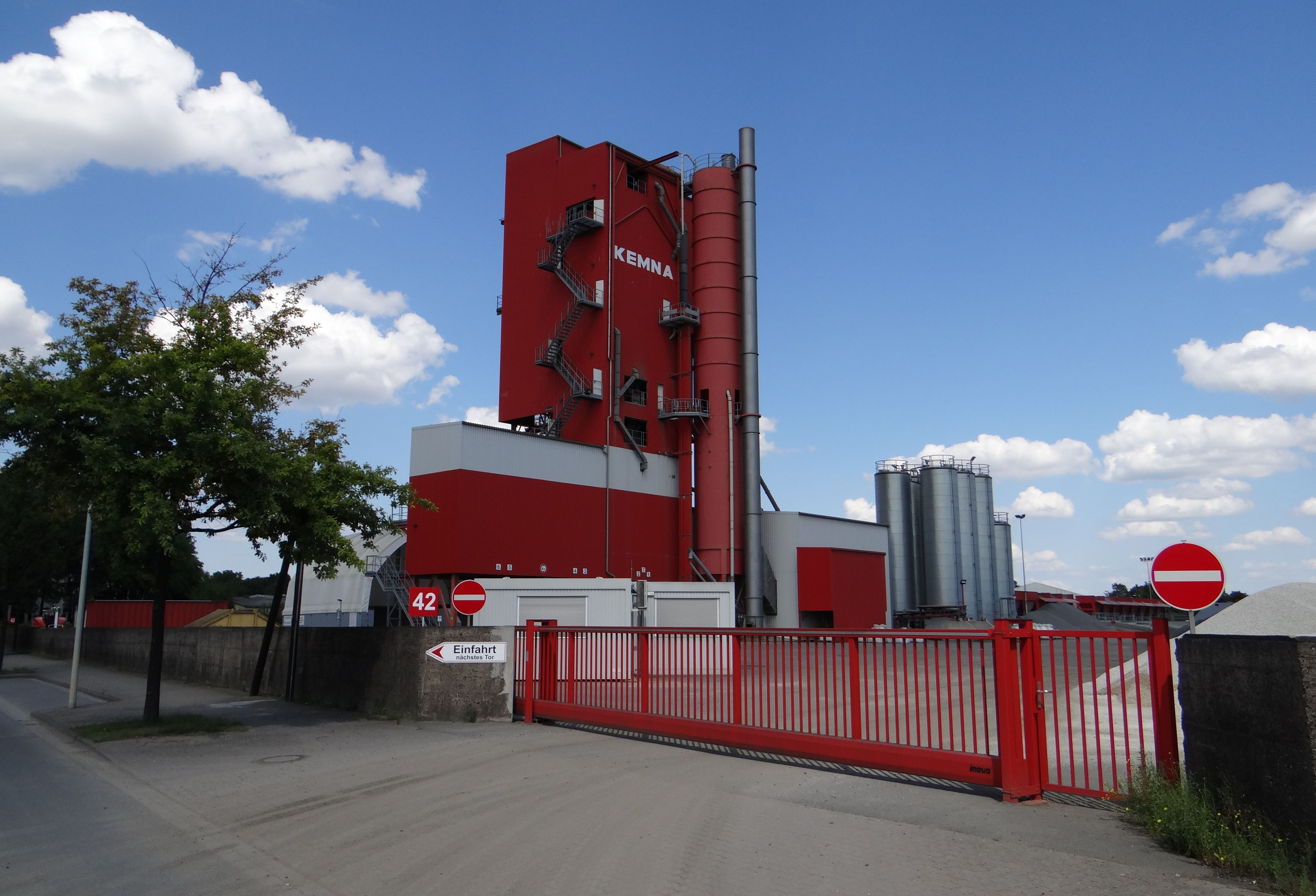
A Kemna plant

The name Kemna still exists under the company name KEMNA BAU Andreae GmbH & Co. KG. today. It is among the largest German construction companies, employing over 1 950 people and generating a yearly revenue of over 400 million Euros.

In 5 quarries and 10 gravel plants, minerals are either produced directly by Kemna or through a majority stake. Kemna Bau Andreae GmbH & Co. KG produces mixes for asphalt road construction in 13 asphalt chippings plants and 26 plants at 8 associated companies. Kemna Bau Andreae GmbH & Co. KG handles all services related to the construction of traffic routes, including some specific and ancillary work in the area of pavement in 9 construction companies and 4 affiliated companies. According to the company, it uses the "recycling of asphalt surfaces, the sealing and reinstallation of contaminated roads and the reprocessing of old materials for reuse as classified building materials", [3] for sustainability.
