= John Fowler (agricultural engineer) =

English agricultural engineer

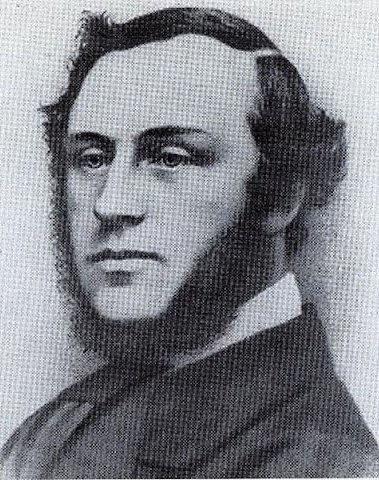
- Born: 11 July 1826; Melksham, Wiltshire, England
- Died: 4 December 1864 (aged 38); Ackworth, Yorkshire, England
- Occupation: Agricultural engineer
- Spouse: Elizabeth Lucy Pease
- Children: five
- Parent(s): John and Rebecca Fowler

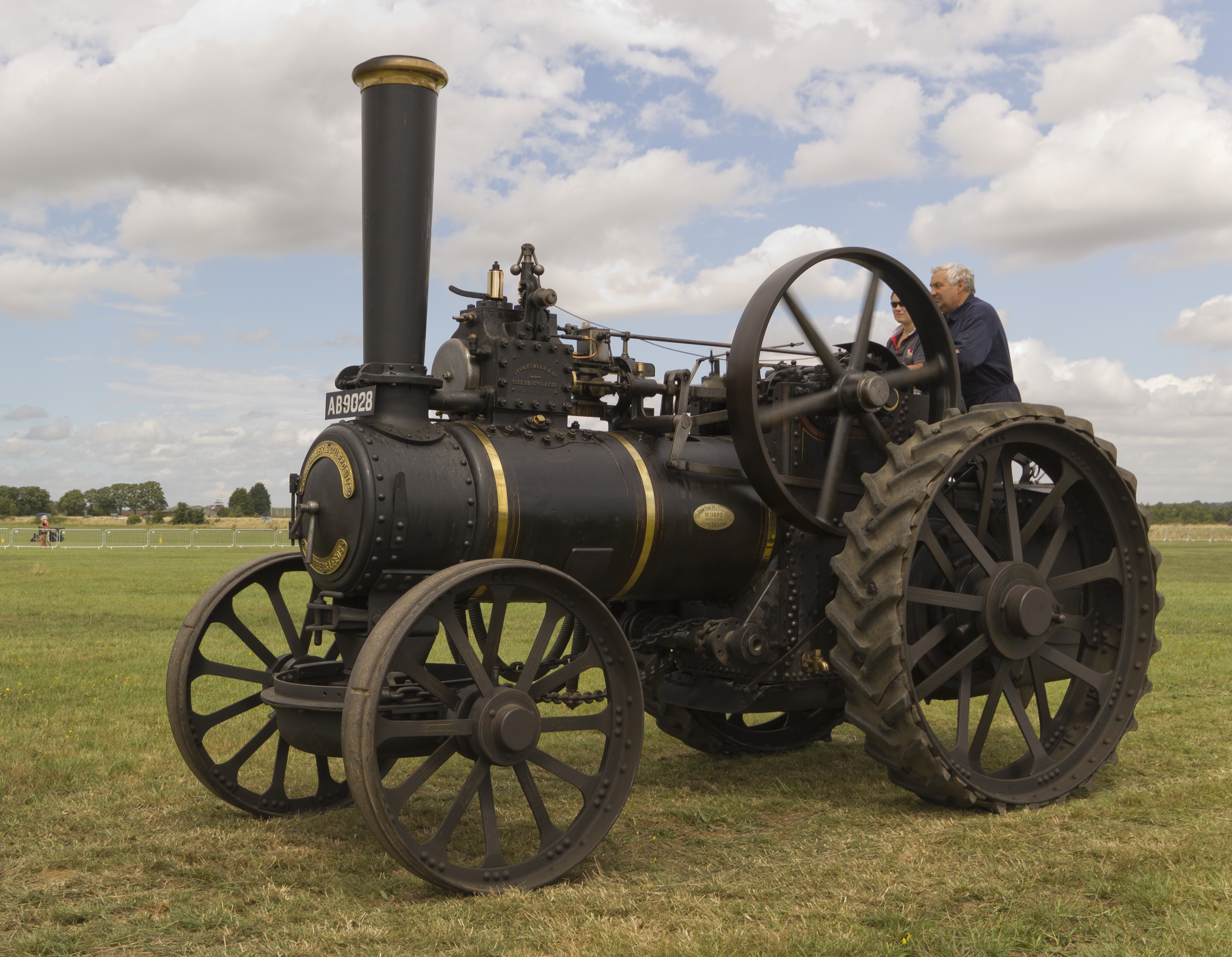
Fowler traction engine

John Fowler (11 July 1826 – 4 December 1864) was an English agricultural engineer who was a pioneer in the use of steam engines for ploughing and digging drainage channels. His inventions significantly reduced the cost of ploughing farmland, and also enabled the drainage of previously uncultivated land in many parts of the world.

== Early life ==
Fowler was born in Melksham, Wiltshire. His father, John Fowler senior was a wealthy Quaker merchant, who had married Rebecca Hull, and together they had three daughters and five sons, of whom Fowler was the third son. His father dealt most successfully in tea but also coal and animals. When he left school Fowler followed his father's wishes and began working for a local corn merchant, but when he came of age in 1847 he turned his back on the corn business and joined the engineering firm of Gilkes Wilson and Company of Middlesbrough. Amongst other things, the company was involved in building steam locomotives and colliery winding engines. The company built a number of locomotives for the Stockton and Darlington Railway.

== Change of career ==
Fowler might have remained with the Middlesbrough firm and made his reputation there, had it not been for a chance visit to Ireland in 1849, probably on business. This was at the time of the Great Famine, and Irish agriculture depended on the potato crop whilst much of the land was uncultivated due to poor drainage. This affected Fowler and he was convinced that there must be a way of bringing more land into production. The normal way to drain agricultural land was to use a mole plough to dig a subterranean drainage channel. The mole plough has a vertical blade with a cylindrical "mole" attached to the bottom. The mole is pointed at the front end, and as it moves through the soil, it leaves a horizontal channel into which porous drainage pipes can be laid. However this required considerable tractive power, so that the size of the plough was limited by the strength of the teams of horses that pulled it. Fowler returned to England and developed a horse-powered ploughing engine that would dig drainage channels.

John Fowler is described as being in partnership with Fry at the Bristol Waggon & Carriage Works circa 1850 before moving to Leeds.

== First drainage plough ==
Fowler's ploughing engine dragged itself across the field on rollers, pulling the mole plough as it went. The engine was driven by a team of horses that walked round a capstan, winding in a rope which was passed through a pulley securely anchored at the far end of the field. The mole would have a string of drainage pipes attached at the rear end and these would be dragged through the channel created by the mole. On completing each length of drains, the engine would be turned, the rope would be let out and the pulley repositioned ready for the next length. Fowler had trouble with the capstan gears and with the rope slipping on the capstan, but was able to demonstrate his engine at a meeting of the Royal Agricultural Society of England at Exeter in 1850. He was able to lay a drain at a depth of 2 ft 6 in (0.76 m) in heavy clay. His invention was awarded a silver medal and was reported as "altogether the most important feature of the exhibition."

== Second drainage plough ==
Fowler then decided to change his design so that the horse engine remained stationary at the corner of the field. The team of horses drove a vertical winch around which a rope was wound. The rope would pass along the edge of the field to a securely anchored pulley and would then pass at right angles across the field to the mole plough. As the horses drove the winch, the rope would drag the mole plough across the field, digging a drainage channel and inserting a length of drainage pipes. When each length had been completed, the pulley would be moved to a new position, the rope would be let out and the plough would be taken to the far side of the field, ready to start the next channel. The design was a vast improvement on the previous one, in that the horsepower was not being expended in dragging the machine across the field, only the plough. Fowler demonstrated his new drainage plough at the Great Exhibition in 1851 and at the Royal Agricultural Society of England meeting at Gloucester in 1853, where he was awarded another silver medal. He was able to lay drains to a depth of 3 ft 6 in (1.07 m).

== First steam-driven drainage plough ==
In his early career, Fowler had worked with steam engines and the logical progression was to apply this method of power to his drainage plough. This he did in 1852 when he designed a steam engine with a winch mounted out in front of the smoke box and a rope running from it, round a pulley anchored at the far side of the field and back to the engine. The engine pulled itself across the field, dragging the mole plough behind it. The design was therefore similar to his first design for the horse-powered plough. The experiment was a failure because the steam engine proved to be too heavy to move easily over soft ground. However, in the same year, on 21 October, Fowler was awarded patent number 480 for "Improvements in Machinery for draining land", believed to be one of the first patents for the use of steam power in agriculture.

== Second steam-driven drainage plough ==
Following the failure of his first steam-driven plough, Fowler reverted to the design used for his second horse-driven plough. His new design consisted of a steam engine placed in a corner of the field driving a winch. A rope led from the winch along the side of the field, around a securely anchored pulley and across the field to the mole plough. As the winch drew in the rope the mole plough was drawn across the field digging a drainage channel as it went. The engine also had a second winch with a rope passing round the same anchored pulley and then passing across the field and around a second pulley and back to the plough. This second rope would be used to drag the plough back to its starting point after completing a drainage line. Both pulleys would then be re-anchored at both ends of the next channel to be dug and the ploughing process would be repeated. The steam plough was demonstrated at the Royal Agricultural Society of England meeting at Lincoln in 1854.

== Steam-driven plough ==
It seemed an obvious progression to use Fowler's latest steam-driven plough for normal ploughing, rather than just drainage channels. However normal ploughing was much lighter work that could be achieved perfectly well by a team of horses and in comparison the steam-driven plough was rather cumbersome. One way of improving the plough's efficiency would be to design a plough that could plough in either direction without having to be turned round. Fowler achieved this by designing a frame for the plough that had two ploughs attached as a kind of see-saw. One of the two plough blades would be swung down to make contact with the soil, depending on the direction the plough was to travel. At the end of each furrow the anchored pulleys would be moved slightly ready for the next furrow.

The firm of Ransome and Sims built the new engine at its Orwell works at Ipswich, and on 10 April 1856 a trial was carried out at Nacton in which 1 acre (~0.4 ha) was ploughed in an hour. Despite the fact that the engine and plough coped well with the task, the effort of re-positioning the pulleys at either end of the field was too time-consuming.

Fowler got round the above problem by using a weighted cart with a pulley mounted beneath the frame. The cart had disc wheels that dug into the ground so that the cart acted as an anchor for the pulley. Two carts would be placed at opposite ends of the furrow so as to pull the plough in either direction, and after completing a furrow, the carts would be winched to the position for the next furrow.

Fowler's modified ploughing system was demonstrated at the Royal Agricultural Society of England meeting at Chelmsford in 1856. and at the following meeting at Salisbury in 1857. In 1854 the R.A.S.E. had offered a £200 prize for the best system of mechanical cultivation, and this had since been raised to £500. At Chelmsford, Fowler's ploughing system was pitted against a rival ploughing system designed by John Smith of Woolston. Smith's design did not fulfil all of the judges' conditions and it was disqualified. Fowler's system worked very well, but the estimated cost of his work was 7s 2½d per acre as against 7s for horse ploughing. The judges therefore decided not to award the prize, a bitter disappointment for Fowler who thought that the superior speed of his system over horse ploughing should have been taken into account.

A similar trial was held at the R.A.S.E. meeting at Salisbury in 1857, but again the prize was withheld. However, Fowler did receive £200 awarded by the Royal Highland and Agricultural Society of Scotland, after a trial at Stirling that same year, despite the judges agreeing that the sole entrant had not exactly fulfilled the conditions the efforts were impressive. Fowler returned to contest the R.A.S.E. ploughing trial at Chester in 1858. He was opposed by a number of competitors but was successful in being awarded the £500 prize.

== Marriage ==
On 30 July 1857 Fowler married his third cousin (once removed), Elizabeth Lucy (1833–1881), fifth child of Joseph Pease, MP for South Durham. Joseph Pease was a wealthy Quaker from Darlington who had supported his father Edward Pease's proposal for the Stockton and Darlington Railway. Fowler had become more closely acquainted with the Pease family when he was working at Middlesbrough. Fowler and his wife settled at Havering in Essex and had five children: Emma Mary Fowler (4 May 1858 – 13 Dec 1939), Edith Rebecca Fowler (15 Oct 1859 – 6 Dec 1895), Laura Elizabeth Fowler (16 Mar 1861 – 11 Oct 1941), John Ernest Fowler (3 Jan 1863 – 21 Apr 1884), Lucy Pease Fowler (25 Apr 1864 – 22 Aug 1909).

== Double-engine ploughing ==
In 1856 Fowler filed a patent relating to a method of ploughing using two self-moving engines, placed at opposite ends of the field and each using a winch to draw a plough backwards and forwards between them. This system did away with the need for pulleys and anchors, but was more expensive in that it required two engines, only one of which was working at a time. It is believed that Fowler persevered with his single-engine ploughing system because it was cheaper and he saw it as more affordable for average farmer. Eventually the double-engine ploughing method superseded the single-engine system that had won the prize at Chester. Because of its expense it was normally operated by contractors.

Fowler first showed his double-engine system of ploughing at the R.A.S.E. ploughing trial at Worcester in 1863. He competed in 1864 in Newcastle upon Tyne competing against a ploughing system designed by his great rivals, the Howard brothers of Bedford. Fowler's system carried off every prize.

Fowler Winching Ploughing Engines

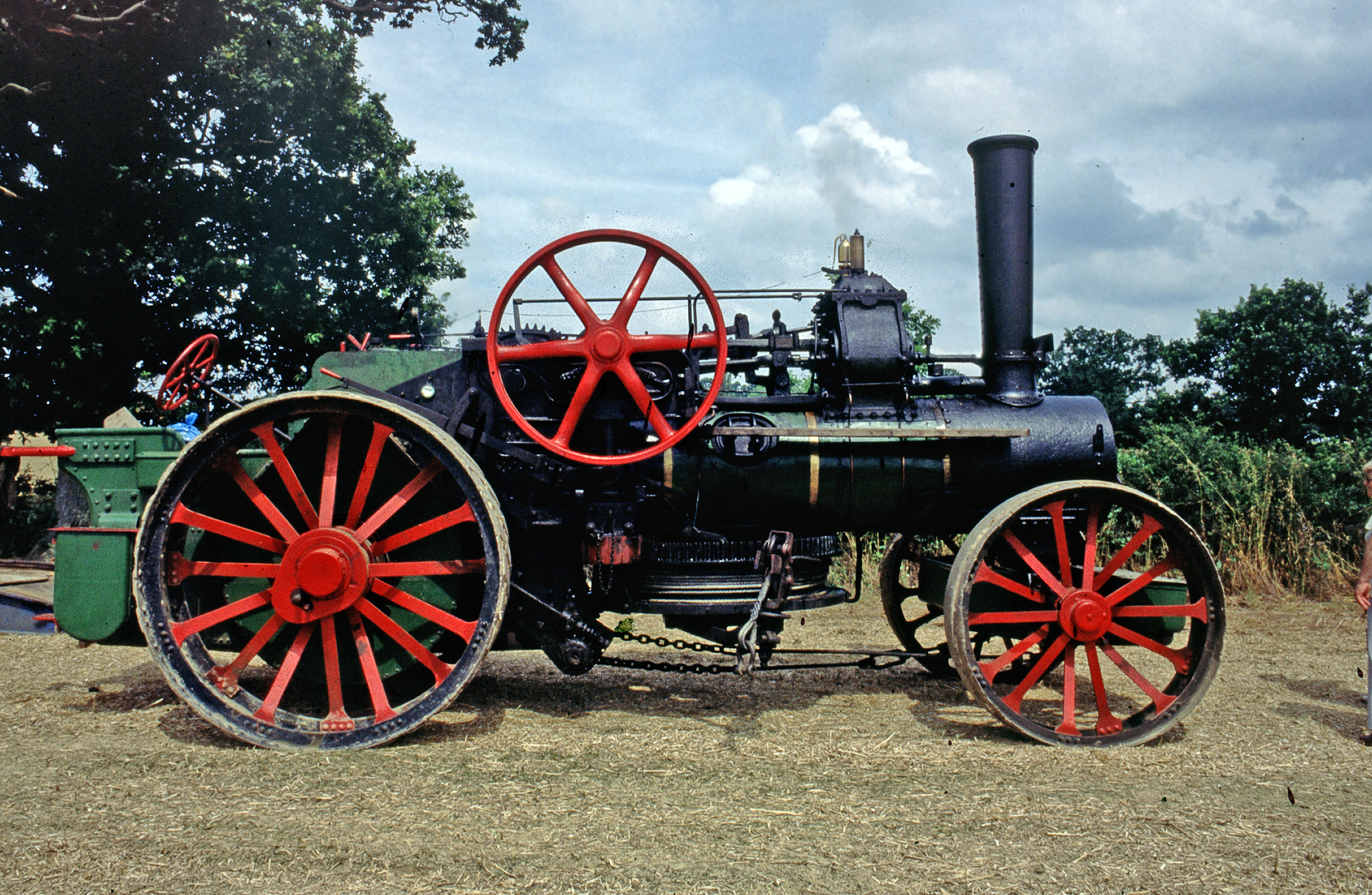
Fowler ploughing engine

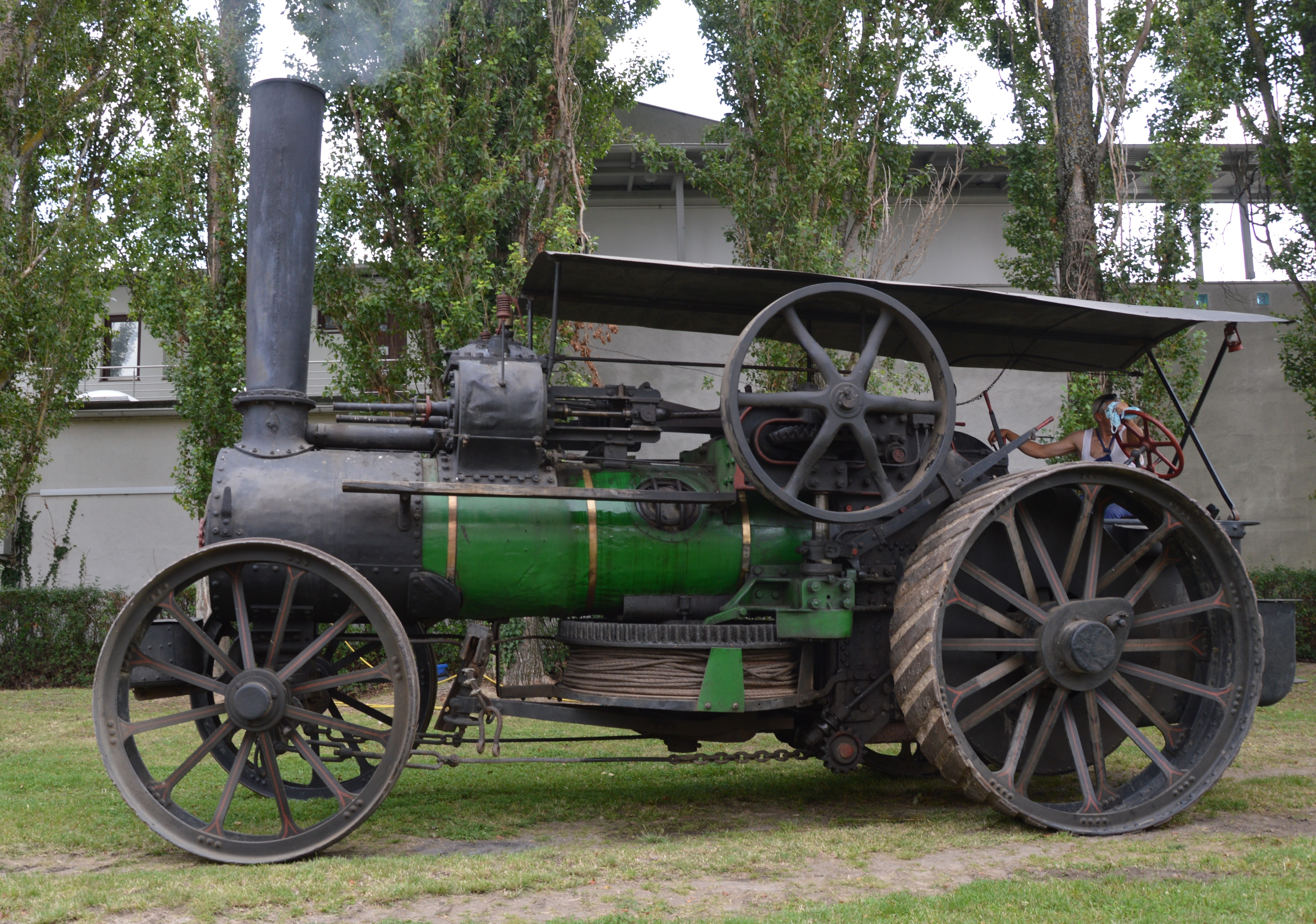
Fowler ploughing engine

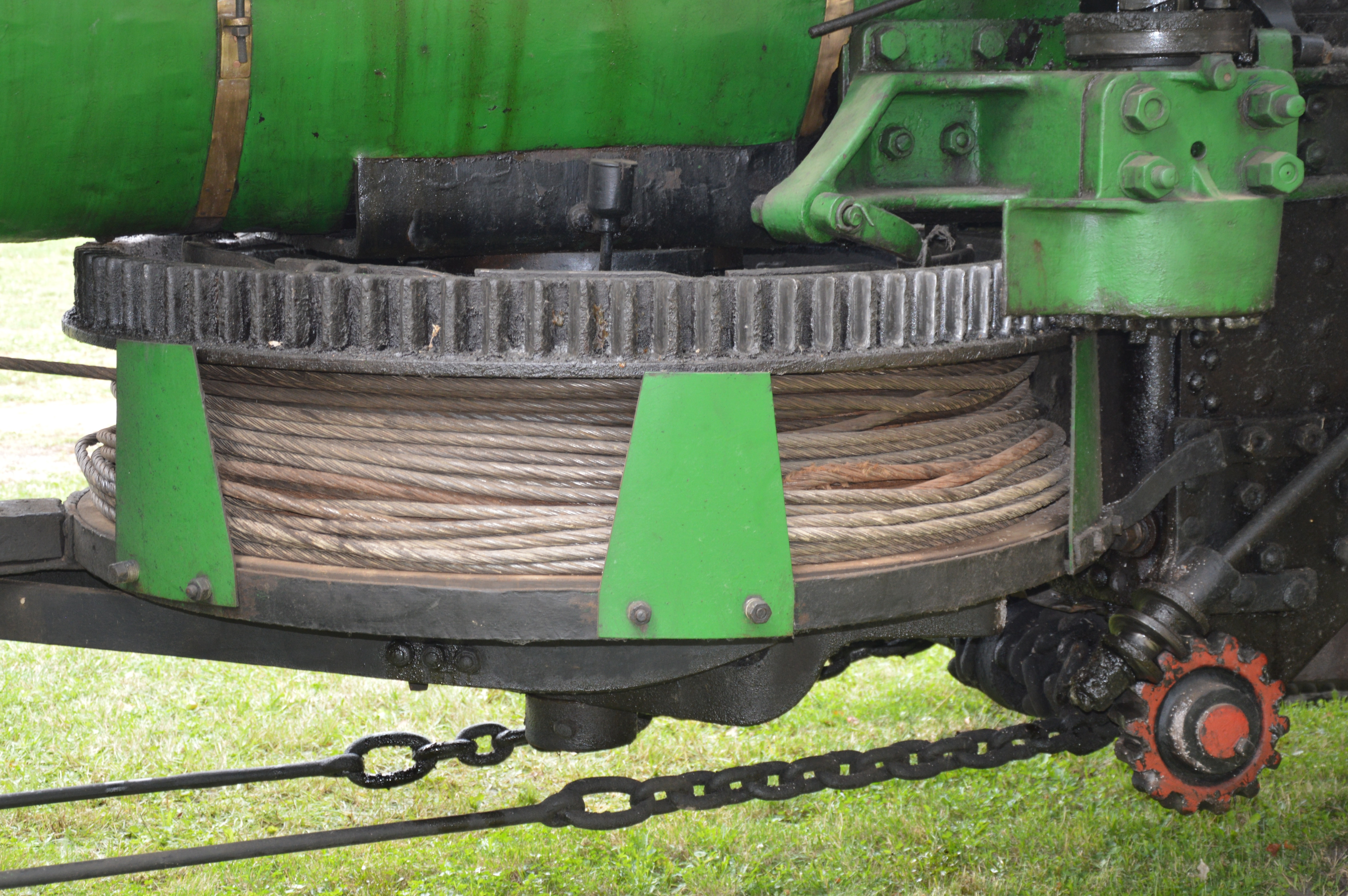
Winch and steering detail of Fowler ploughing engine

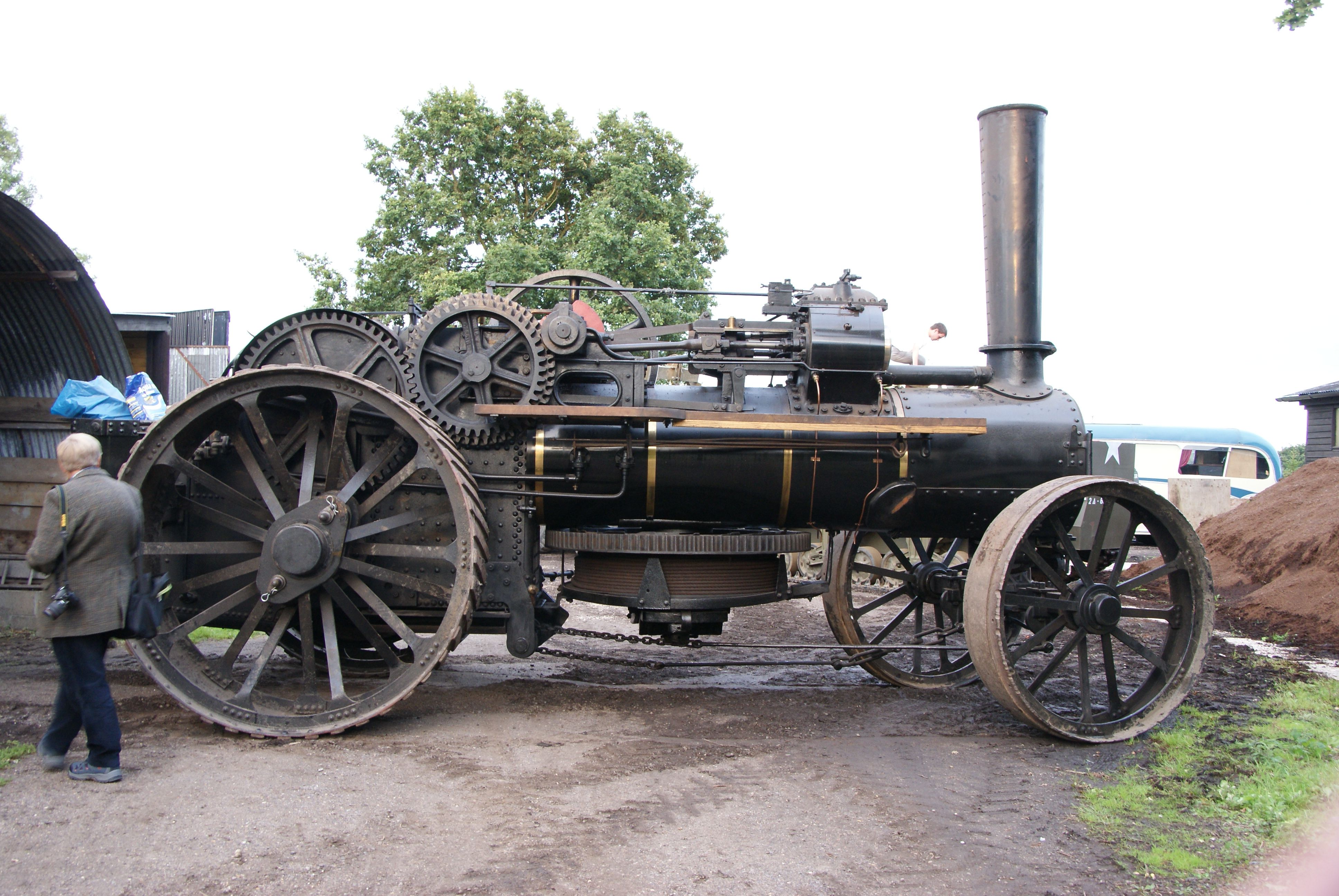
Fowler ploughing engine

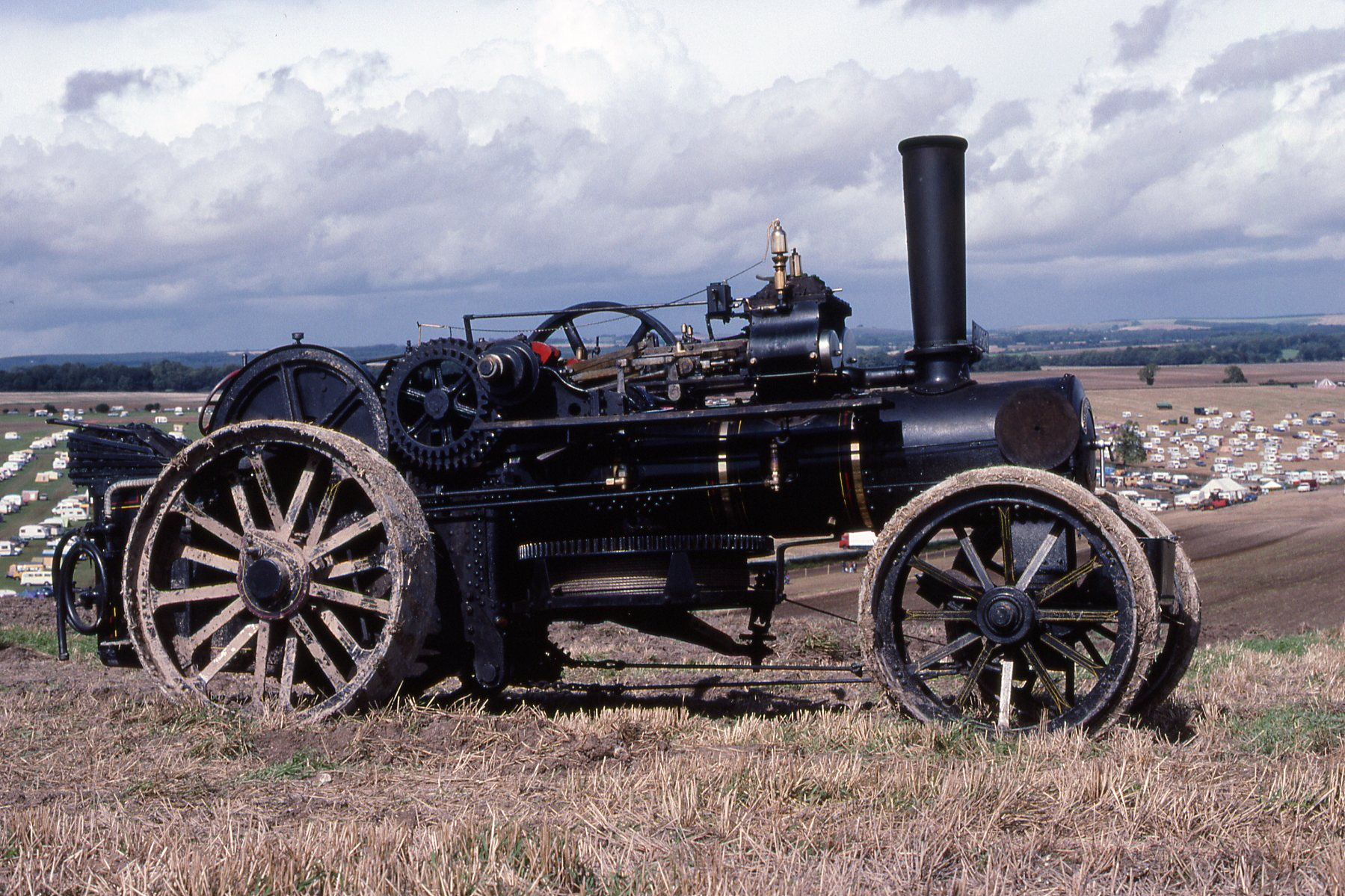
Fowler ploughing engine

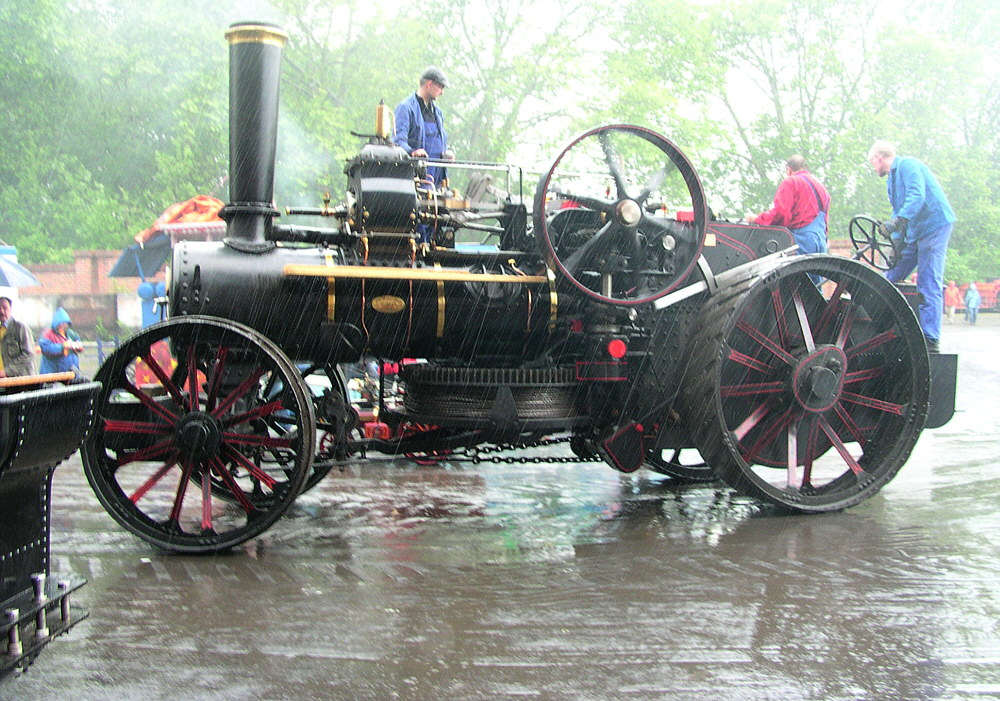
Fowler ploughing engine

== Later career ==
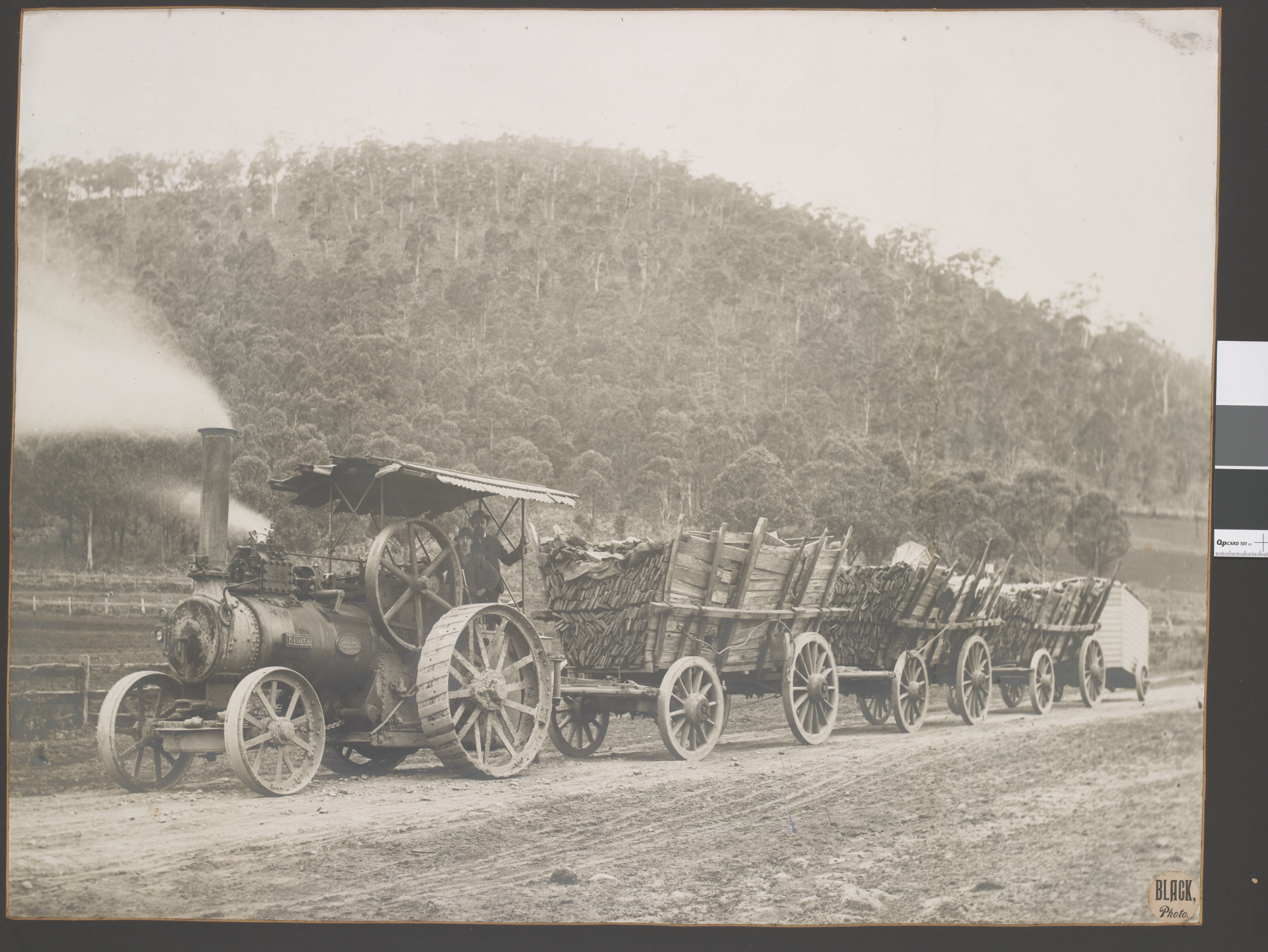
Steam traction engine at Mt Warrenheip near Ballarat

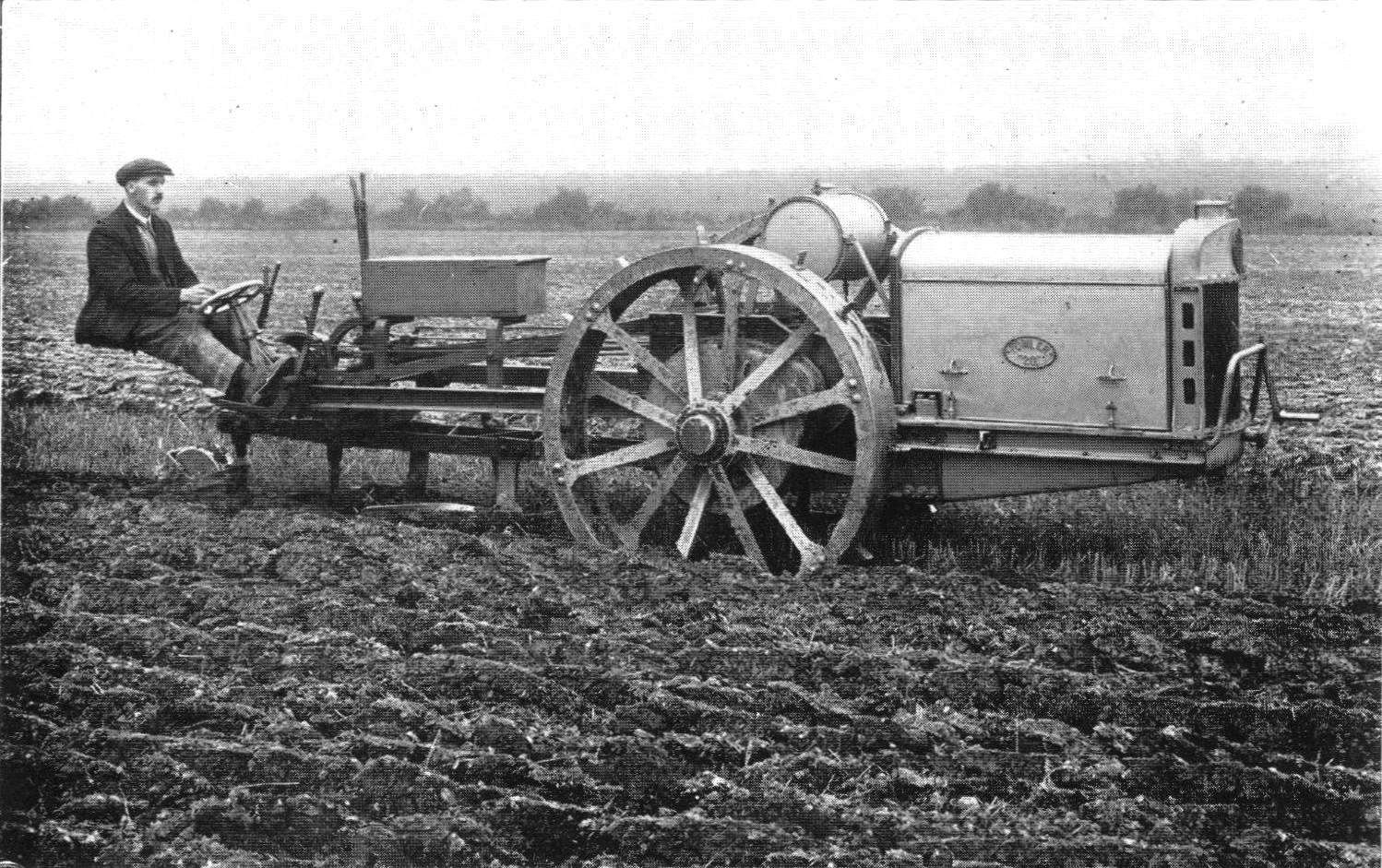
Fowler self-contained motor plough

Between 1850 and 1864 Fowler took out in his own name and in partnership with other persons thirty-two patents for ploughs and ploughing apparatus, reaping machines, seed drills, traction engines, slide valves, the laying of electric telegraph cables, and the making of bricks and tiles.

By 1858 Fowler had forty sets of ploughing tackle in use, and by 1861 he had one hundred sets working. From 1860 the manufacture of the ploughing machinery was carried out by the firm of Kitson and Hewitson of Leeds. Fowler inspired many industrialists, such as Julius Kemna (whom he cooperated with), to build (and later improve) his revolutionary steam-based machines.

=== John Fowler and Company ===
In 1862 Fowler formed a partnership with William Watson Hewitson of the above firm and founded Hewitson and Fowler based at Hunslet. A year later Hewitson died and the firm became John Fowler and Company. Fowler's ploughing sets were sold all over the world and were responsible for bringing land into production that was previously unable to be cultivated.

== Retirement ==
Fowler had worked so hard in developing his ideas that he had undermined his health. He was advised to take more rest and so he retired to Ackworth in Yorkshire, to recuperate. He was persuaded to take up hunting as a way of getting exercise and whilst out with the hunt he had a fall and sustained a compound fracture of his arm. Whilst recovering from this mishap, he developed tetanus and died on 4 December 1864, at his home in Ackworth. He died only months after his great triumph at the Newcastle ploughing trial, at age 38.

His brothers Robert, William and Barnard had joined him in the business he had founded and they continued to run the firm after his death. Fowler's method of ploughing continued to be used until well into the twentieth century when the internal combustion engine allowed the development of light but powerful tractors that could draw a plough behind them.

A monument to John Fowler's invention of the steam plough was placed on his father-in-law's Pierremont estate in Darlington in 1856, but was moved in 1870 to South Park, Darlington. The plinth may still be seen there, but the plough that it supported disappeared in 1970.
