= Julius Kemna =

German machine manufacturer and industrialist

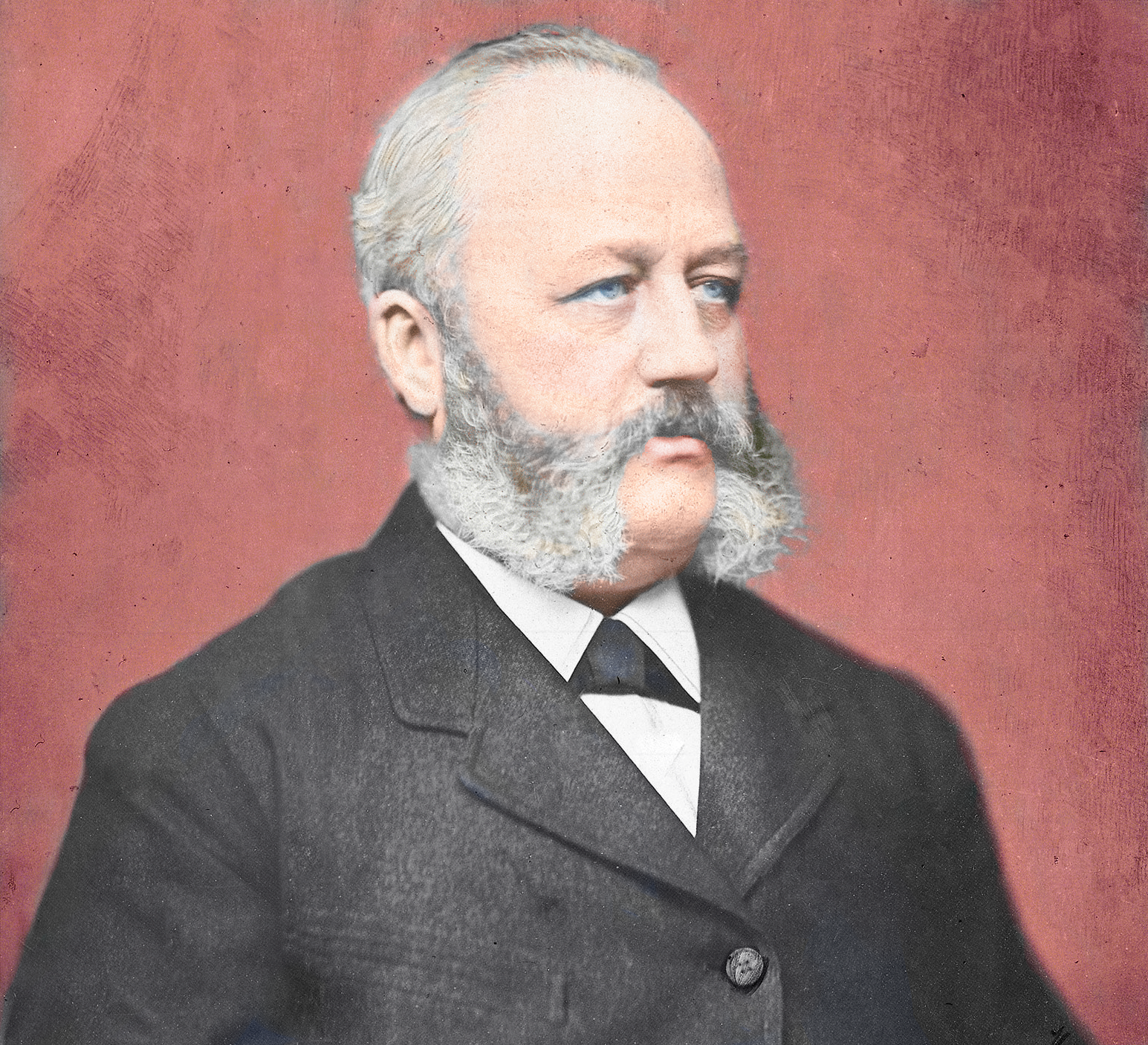
Julius Kemna

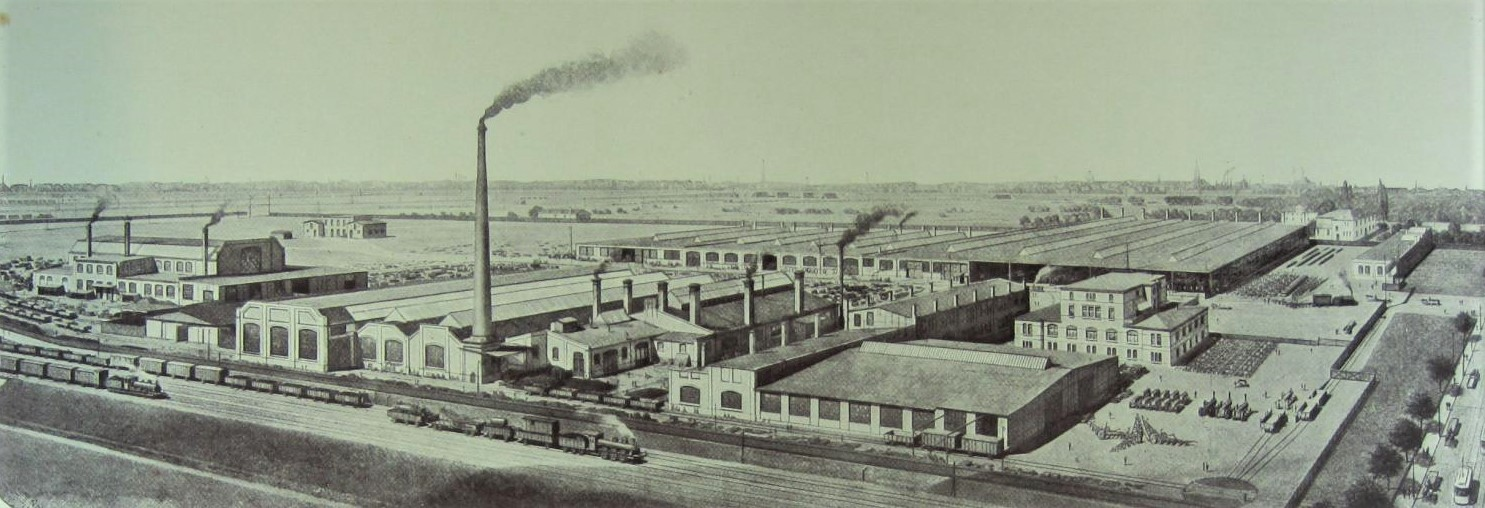
Kemna Factory in Breslau

Julius Kemna (December 8, 1837 – June 8, 1898) was a German machine manufacturer and industrialist. He was the founder of Kemna Bau.

== Biography ==
=== Early life ===
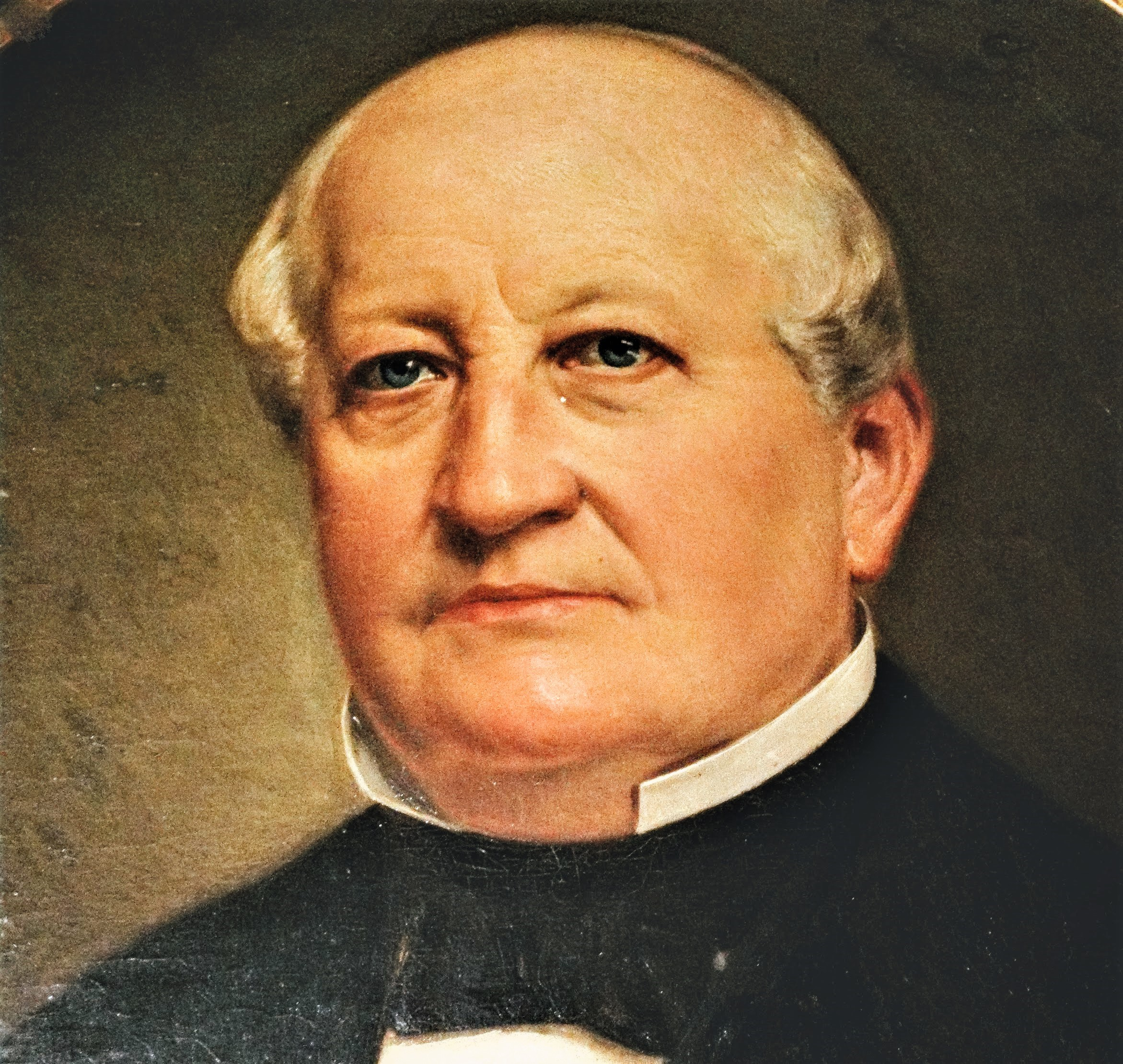
Johann Abraham Kemna, Julius Kemna's father

Julius Kemna was born the only son of Johann Abraham Kemna and Carolina Wilhelmina (Wilhelmine) van Hees on December 8, 1837 in Barmen. The family of Johann Abraham Kemna, a wine wholesaler from Barmen and Royal Prussian purveyor to the court (1810–1878), can be traced back to the 15th century, where they lived in the Kemna manor. Kemna's mother, Carolina Wilhelmina van Hees (1814-1880), was the niece of the well known Barmer school founder Susanna Sophia Antoinetta van Hees and granddaughter of the first pharmacist in Barmen Johann Hermann von Hees. Kemna associated with people of highest social standing from childhood and was therefore able to establish beneficial contacts for himself and his future company accordingly. It is also probable that Kemna felt encouraged to step out of the shadow of his illustrious parents and prove himself due to this.

Julius Kemna moved from Barmen to Silesia at a young age and initially worked in agriculture. In 1867, Kemna founded a workshop for "the construction of agricultural machinery". In 1870, Kemna married Philippine Lübbert (1847-1921), who grew up in Zweibrodt palace and was the sister of Eduard Lübbert ( a well-known classical philologist and archaeologist). Philippine Kemna bore 3 sons, one of them Erich Kemna.

=== The company's ascent ===
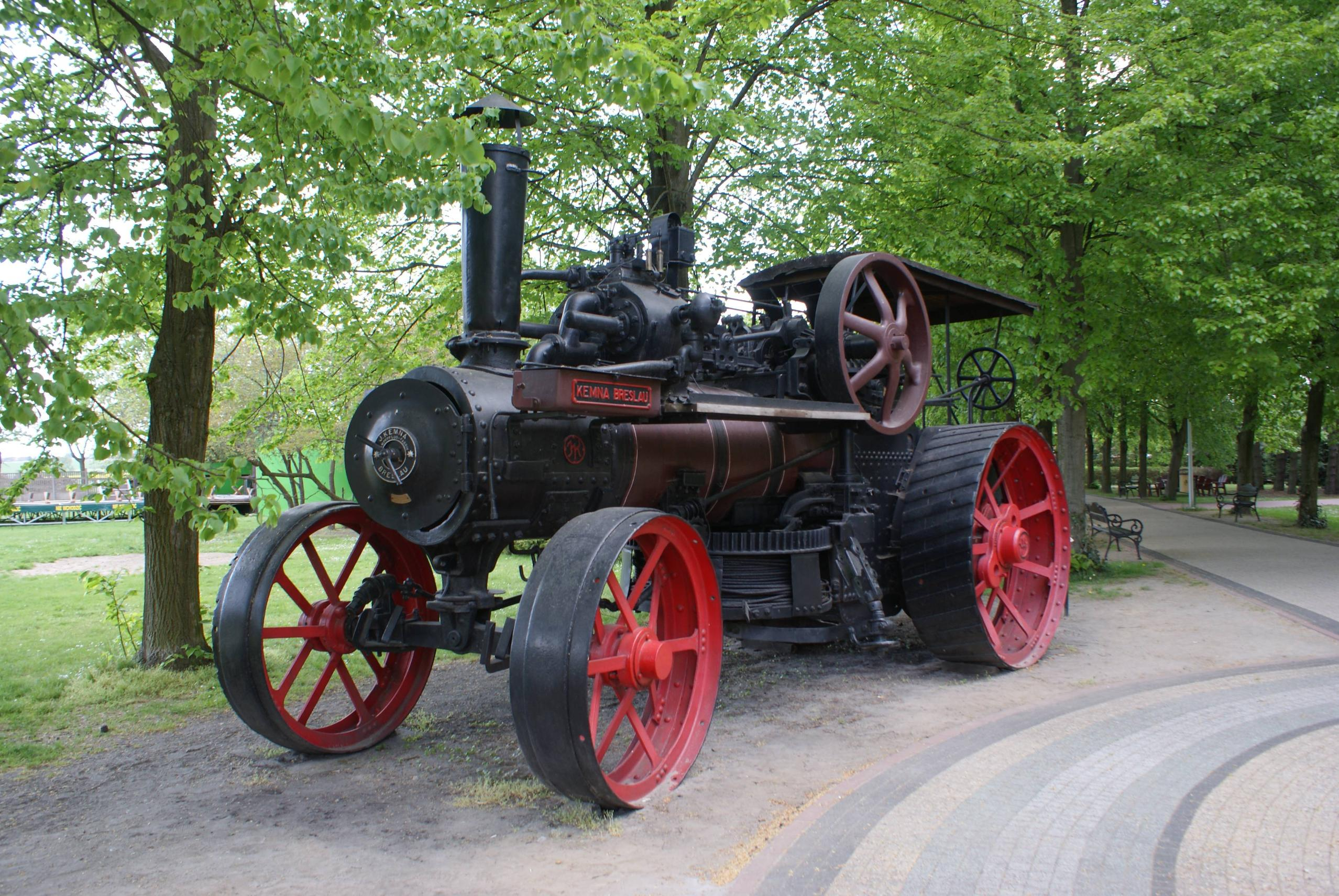
A Kemna steam locomotive

After the end of the 1870–1871 war, Kemna believed the time had come to bring steam plows to German agriculture in large numbers, achieving his desire by acquiring English steam plow etchers and making them known to landowners through contract plowing. This Practical experience led Kemna's company to free himself more and more from English producers and become a self-sufficient entity. One of the first steps in this process was to make the plows for the locomotives sourced from abroad (which means that Kemna adapted its plows to these locomotives and thus also became successful on the international stage). In 1882, Kemna started producing road construction machines and other steam engines. In the course of the next years, in which the production of steam road rollers made rapid progress, the construction of chopping machines for high-power drives was initiated, which became one of the primary production sectors within Kemna.

=== Death and legacy ===
Julius Kemna died in the year of 1898 in Breslau and bequeathed 30 marks to his employees for each year of service; enough money for many to build a house. Kemna had recognized that the steam engine was revolutionary for industry as well as for agriculture and road construction. His many years of experience with English steam plow systems supported his company's upswing. He is considered a "pioneer in agriculture and machine construction."

Following Julius Kemnas death, his company developed into a large-scale industrial enterprise at the turn of the century. Due to capacity expansions, about 900 workers were employed on a 52,000 m2 industrial site in 1905. At the beginning of the 20th century, Julius Kemna's company became "the leading steam plough company on the European continent and invaded the monopoly position of English companies on the world market". In 1923, Kemna's company became the first company in Germany to launch a road roller with a crude oil engine (Deutz diesel engine).
