= Friedrich Lübbert =

German conductor and oboist (1818–1892)

Friedrich Lübbert (26 March 1818 — 15 January 1882) was a German composer, military kapellmeister and oboist. He is best known as the composer of the Helenenmarsch, a popular piece for military bands written in honour of countess Helene von Hülsen. The march won the first prize in an 1857 competition sponsored by music publisher Bote & Bock.

He was kapellmeister for 27 years until his final retirement in 1881.
