= Eduard Lübbert =

German classical philologist (1830-1889)

Friedrich Wilhelm Eduard Lübbert (10 June 1830, Zweybrodt near Breslau – 31 July 1889, Bonn) was a German classical philologist known for his studies of Latin grammar and syntax as well as for his numerous published works involving the Greek lyric poet Pindar.

He studied at the Universities of Breslau, Berlin and Bonn, obtaining his habilitation in 1859 at Breslau. In 1865 he became an associate professor at the University of Giessen, where in 1871, he attained a full professorship. Later on, he served as a professor at the Universities of Kiel (from 1874) and Bonn (from 1881).

== Selected published works ==
- "De elocutione Pindari", 1853 (dissertation thesis).
- "Commentationes pontificales", 1859 (habilitation thesis).
- Beiträge zur Tempus- und Moduslehre des älteren Lateins, (Contributions to the tense and mode of teaching older Latin); 2 parts, Breslau 1867–1870 (Grammatical studies 1–2).
  - Part 1: Der Conjunctiv Perfecti und das Futurum exactum im älteren Latein. Breslau 1867. (The perfect subjunctive and futurum exactum in the older Latin).
  - Part 2: Die Syntax von Quom und die Entwickelung der relativen Tempora im älteren Latein. Ein Beitrag zur Geschichte der lateinischen Sprache. Breslau 1870. (The syntax of quom and the evolution of the relative tenses in older Latin; A contribution to the history of the Latin language).
- "Commentationes syntacticae", 1871.
- "De Pindari carminibus Aegineticis quattuor postremis", 1879.
- "De Pindari carmine Pythico secundo", 1880.
- Alexandria unter Ptolemaeus Philadelphus und Euergetes, 1880 – (Alexandria under Ptolemaeus Philadelphus and Euergetes).
- "Diatriba in Pindari locum de Adrasti regno Sicyonio", 1884.
- "De Pindari carminibus dramaticis tragicis eorumque cum epiniciis cognatione", 1884.
- "De priscae cuiusdam epiniciorum formae apud Pindarum vestigiis", 1885.
- "De poesis Pindaricae in archa et sphragide componendis arte", 1885.
- "De Pindari poetae et Hieronis regis amicitiae primordiis et progressu", 1886.
- "Commentatio de Pindaricorum carminum compositione ex Nomorum historia illustranda", 1887.
- "Commentatio de Pindaro dogmatis de migratione animarum cultore", 1887.
- "De Pindari studiis chronologicis", 1887.
- "De Pindaro theologiae Orphicae censore", 1888.
