= Aveling-Barford =

Former construction equipment manufacturer

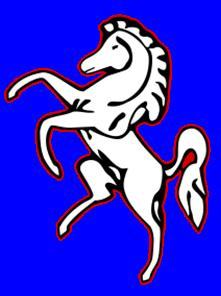
- The Invicta logo of the company, borrowed from Kent
- Company type: Private company
- Industry: Heavy machinery, construction equipment
- Predecessor: Aveling & Porter, Barford & Perkins
- Founded: 13 February 1934
- Founder: Ruston & Hornsby
- Defunct: 1988
- Fate: Sold in 1988 to Wordsworth Holdings
- Successor: Wordsworth Holdings (Barfords)
- Headquarters: Invicta Works, Grantham
- Area served: Worldwide
- Products: Off-road dump trucks, dumpers
- Owner: Ruston & Hornsby (1934–67); British Leyland (1967–88)
- Number of employees: c.2,000
- Subsidiaries: Barford Developments, Barford (Agricultural)

Aveling-Barford was a large engineering company making road rollers, motorgraders, front loaders, site dumpers, dump trucks and articulated dump trucks in Grantham, England. In its time, it was an internationally known company.

== History ==
Barford and Perkins, formed in 1840, were known for their smaller road rollers and dairy machinery. Aveling had made the first known steam road roller in 1867, and made larger types of road rollers. For many years the two companies had worked together, when selling around the world.

First established in 1850 its owners incorporated a limited liability company on 16 July 1895 to hold the business with the name Aveling & Porter. Though Aveling & Porter's operations remained independent in 1919 its shares were sold to a new holding company, Agricultural & General Engineers (AGE). The holding company was unsuccessful and collapsed in February 1932. Its fourteen subsidiaries – which in the mid-1920s had 10,000 employees – were sold by AGE's liquidator and most of them regained their independence.

In October 1931, the plan was that Barford would move to Kent in January 1932; it was a difficult financial time, and the collaborative move would hugely help the economies of scale. Frank Perkins (engineer), whose father owned Barford and Perkins, had worked at Aveling in Kent, where he worked with Charles Chapman (engineer) from 1929; Chapman would invent the first automobile diesel engine. Charles Chapman was the main technical innovator of Perkins Engines, itself founded in June 1932.

=== Ruston and Hornsby ===
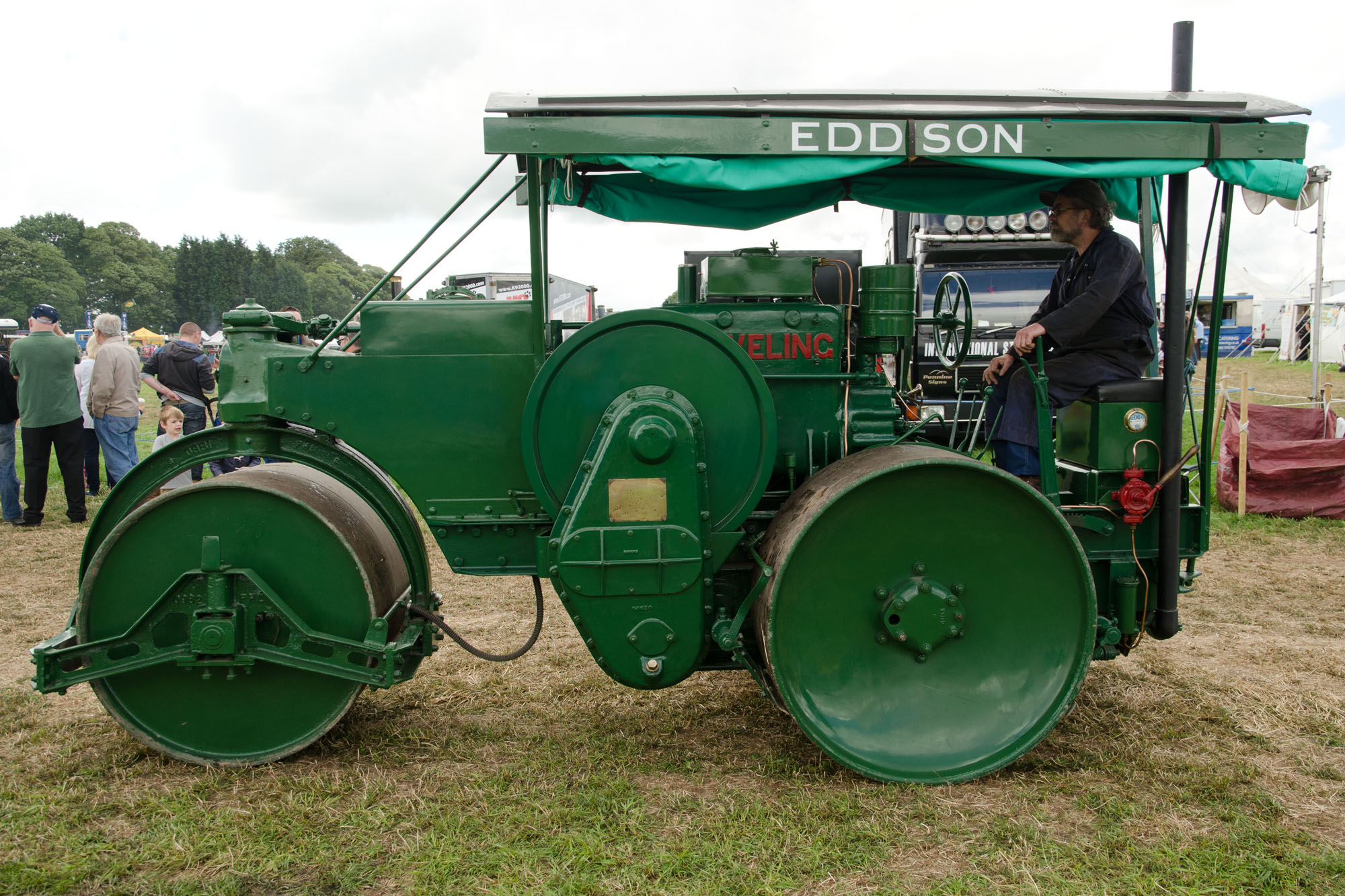
1938 Aveling-Barford diesel road roller

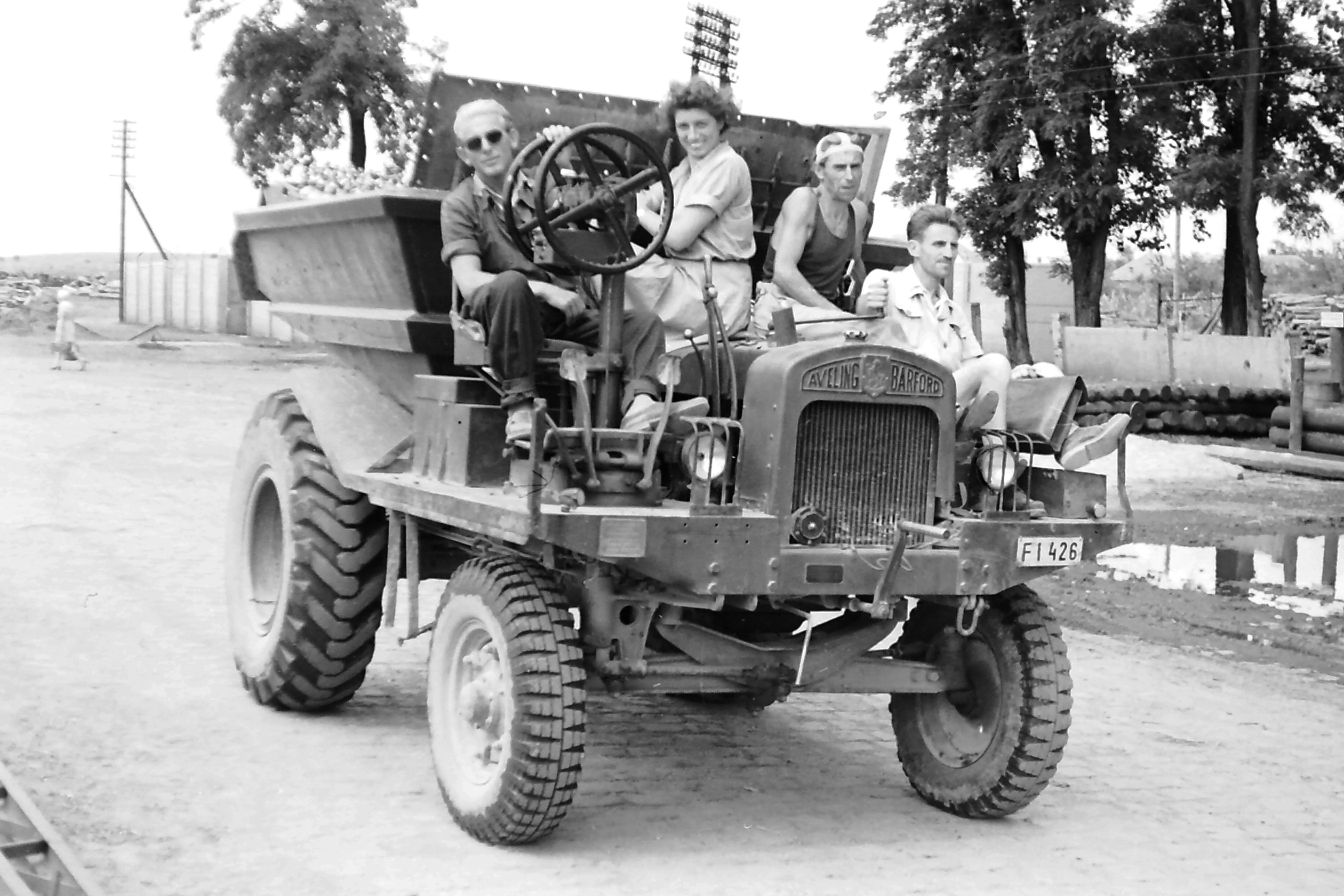
Dump truck, 1949

Aveling-Barford underwent a dramatic revival. Two subsidiaries, Aveling & Porter and Barford & Perkins, kept on operating profitably throughout the collapse of their parent. Edward Barford of Barford & Perkins also chairman of Aveling & Porter enlisted the help of R. A. Lister & Co and its associate Ruston & Hornsby. Lister and Ruston bought the two companies from the receiver. The products of all four businesses were fitted with diesel engines.

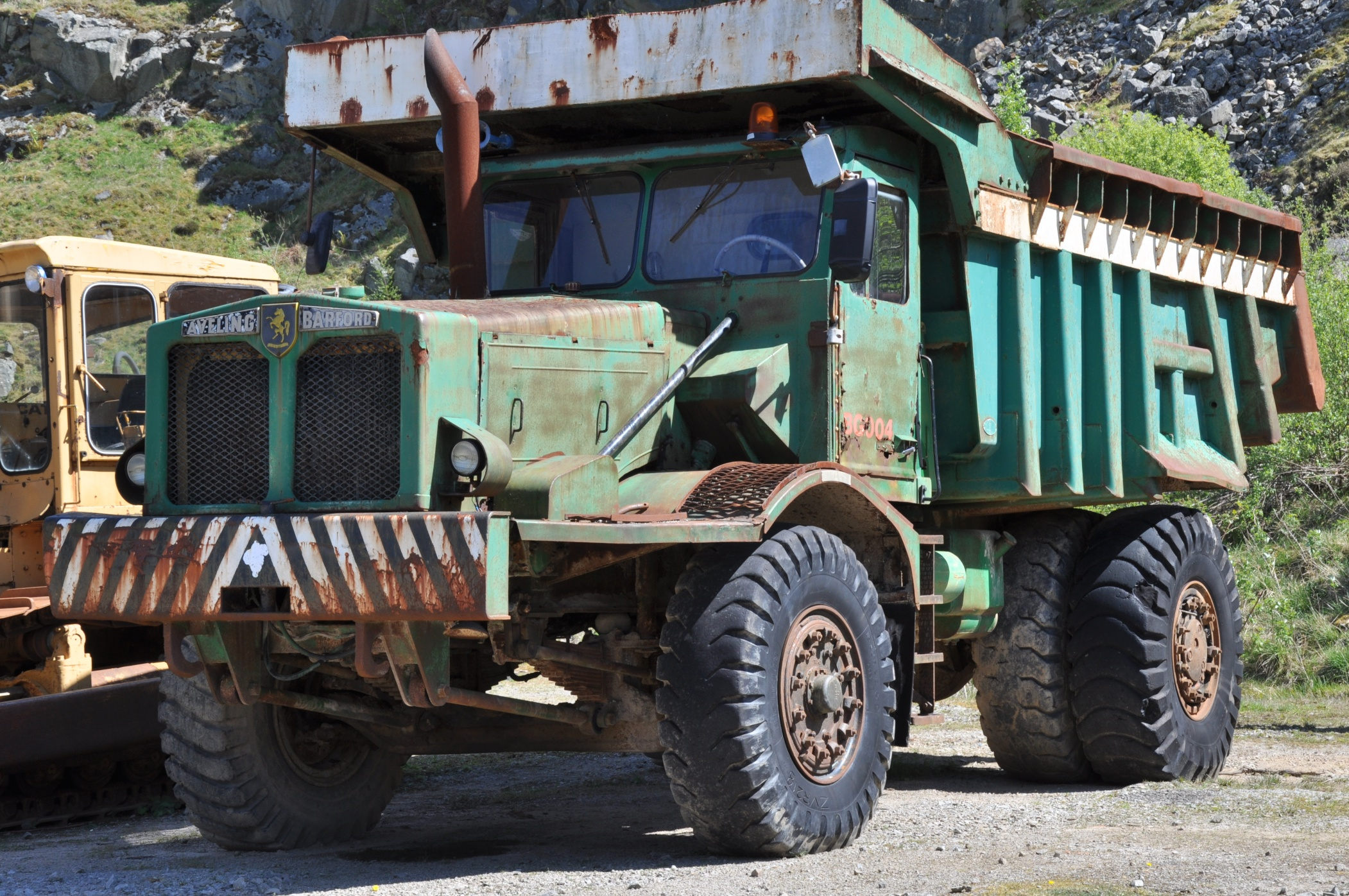
Aveling-Barford dump truck

Aveling & Porter immediately took over the activities of Barford & Perkins changing its own name to Aveling-Barford on 13 February 1934. Early in 1934 operations moved from Rochester to a 36-acre site, Invicta Works, on long-term lease (to 2009) from Ruston & Hornsby at Grantham. On the board of directors were Edward James Barford and William Geoffrey Barford (from Barford & Perkins), and John Heinrich Wulff Pawlyn, a director of Ruston & Hornsby based at the Ransomes subsidiary in Ipswich, and George Ruston Sharpley, the managing director of Ruston & Hornsby. For many years all the vehicles were powered by R & H diesel engines. R & H had also previously made road rollers, but concentrated this all at Grantham.

Aveling-Barford was listed on the London Stock Exchange in July 1937.

The company symbol, known as the 'Rampant Horse of Kent', is possibly derived from the Saxon Steed. As Stuttgart has a 'Rampant Horse' as its town symbol, so has Porsche. Continental AG, in Lower Saxony, also has a Rampant Horse as its symbol; and Ferrari of Italy has the symbol as well. It claimed to have invented the road-roller, possibly as an earlier incarnation in Kent.

=== Public company ===
For the first year, it had to pay a large amount of excess profits tax (EPT).

The jointing system had been developed on German autobahns in the late 1930s.

In the 1930s it made cooling equipment for dairy farms, and cooking equipment for hotels, hospitals, and canteens. It became a public company on 29 June 1937. At this time it claimed to make 75% of the road rollers in Britain, and world leaders in their field.

Edward Barford (23 April 1898 – 11 July 1979) became the chairman of the company from 1933, remaining until 1968. It began making its first earth moving equipment – the Aveling Dumper; the 12-ton Aveling Dumper was developed in 1938. Wieland joints in concrete roads was licensed as exclusive to the company, in England.

During the Second World War the company made Bren Gun Carriers, shell fuse caps and the Loyd Carrier.

The company also made calfdozers (small bulldozers). From April 1946 two subsidiary companies were formed – Barford Developments Ltd and Barford (Agricultural) Ltd. On 17 September 1946 a new factory in Newcastle upon Tyne was opened.

In 1949 it came to an agreement with Austin-Western Inc. of Aurora, Illinois to make their motor graders under licence, known as the Aveling-Austin motor grader.

In the early 1950s, 70% of equipment was being exported. It bought Goodwin Barsby of Leicester in 1954, which made 'Autobatch' asphalt plants.

It bought Hoveringham Engineering in July 1961, which made structural steelwork, and sand and gravel plants, being known as Invicta Bridge and Engineering from May 1965.

54 A-B 30-ton SN vehicles built stage 1 of the Aswan Dam, in Egypt, in the early 1960s.

It won the Queen's Award to Industry in April 1967. It won the same award for Export in April 1972. The company had a turnover of £15m and was Britain's largest manufacturer of construction equipment. The US had a smaller number of construction equipment manufacturers, largely led by Caterpillar and Euclid. In the 1960s, Caterpillar had two large European plants in Gosselies in Belgium, and Grenoble in France.

=== British Leyland ===
In November 1967 Leyland Motor Corporation offered £9.25m for the company, which was accepted.. In 1968, when Leyland Motor Corporation and British Motor Holdings merged, Aveling-Barford became part of the new British Leyland Motor Corporation conglomerate.

Leyland engines were to be used as part of the Leyland Motor Corporation deal, but there were reliability problems. JCB were also interested in taking over A-B. The takeover was completed on 1 January 1968.

In September 1975 Leyland bought Thomas Ward of Gainsborough for £3m, and moved A-B tractor shovel (loader) manufacturing there., and Aveling-Barford became Aveling Marshall after BLMC acquired Marshall-Fowler.

Leyland Special Products was headquartered at Sysonby Lodge, on Nottingham Road in Melton Mowbray. In the late 1970s, Leyland Special Products put £6.5m into improving the factories at Grantham and Newcastle, and took on 500 more staff. This division by 1978 was SP Industries, with David Abell as managing director. Aveling Barford Holdings was formed in September 1978, with David Abell as chairman and Leslie Wharton as managing director, followed by Jack Smart by 1980.

By December 1979, BL was looking to sell the company. By the early 1980s the company was not profitable, and 800 workers out of 1100 were looking at redundancy, unless the company was drastically restructured.

The company was bought on 21 December 1983. The company's turnover was £32m, but the company was still succeeding with dumper trucks and road rollers. It was bought by American businessman Reid Eschallier (3 December 1934 – 13 July 2007) from Pennsylvania. In 1979, the construction equipment company Acrow had wanted to take over Barfords

By 1985 the company was loss-making. On 14 June 1988, it became insolvent, from a debenture taken out in 1986. and by October 1988 it had been bought from the receivers by Wordsworth Holdings.

In the 1990s, a company was called Aveling Barford (Machines) Ltd.

=== Pension scheme fraud ===
In February 1989 Lincolnshire Police looked into the company pension scheme. In late April 1989 Royal Insurance agreed to fill a discrepancy in the pension fund. The pension fund had originally been run by Equity & Law (taken over by Axa).

The court case, in Birmingham, ran from 16 March 1992 to 14 April 1992. In August 1992, after four months, a pension scheme trustee was sent to prison in August 1992. Three people were cleared of fraud.

=== Visits ===
Conservative prime minister Alec Douglas-Home visited Grantham on Friday 29 November 1963, where he stayed overnight in Leadenham, at the home of Lt-Col William Reeve, the chairman of the local Conservative group. The prime minister toured the factory from 1pm, with Edward Barford and went for a day of pheasant shooting at Scopwick, and to Leadenham Hall; he had dinner at 6pm in the George Hotel.

=== Products ===
Aveling-Barford were best known for their line of three-point roadrollers including the small GA up to the GC, The "Master Pavior" 3-point roller was one of the most famous diesel rollers. However many other types of earthmoving machinery were designed and manufactured by Aveling Barford in England.

A-B were also significant for their all wheel driven and all wheel steering motor graders often using Leyland Trucks running gear as were also producers of ADT models called the RDX Series with 6X6. A line of rigid dumpers was manufactured from 30 tonne RD030 through to the 50 tonne RD050 and eventually a RD55 and RD65 were added.

A new dumptruck the RD44 was unveiled at Bauma to try and rejuvenate the line of dumptrucks but with limited success

During the 1970s to the 1980s A-B were producing their own range of front loaders with 4X4 axles and are fitted with Cummins, Leyland or Ford heavy duty diesel engines. They resembled the popular British made Bray or Ford loader models of the 1980s.

Site dumpers were first mass manufactured by A-B in the 1940s mostly with Fordson Tractor Diesel engines. Today these are still made and sold under the Barford name.

=== Modern day incarnation ===
The site was bought by Wordsworth Holdings in 1988, who went into administration in 2010. Barfords is now owned by Invictas Engineering.

12 October 2015 Invictas Engineering sold the Supply of parts to Shellplant.

In 2006 Singapore-based ST Kinetics bought the rights to the Aveling Barford RXD series articulated dumptrucks, which are now sold under the TRX Build brand.

In August 2007 Moxy Engineering of Norway announced plans to buy the intellectual property rights of the Barford rigid dump truck range.

In 2008 Moxy was purchased by the South Korean Doosan (formerly Daewoo), and renamed to Doosan Moxy As and later Doosan Infracore Norway AS. The project was later cancelled and the prototype of the new range earlier presented at Bauma in 2007 was scrapped.

Barfords' sports field is still in existence, called Arnoldfield, in Gonerby Hill Foot.

In October 2012 Gravity FM, Grantham's community radio station produced a tribute in words and music to Aveling Barford, on sale to raise funds to support the running costs of the station.

=== Managing directors ===
- 1956 Colin Ryan (5 September 1912 – 31 October 1983), until 1969, when he became chairman, originally from Blackpool, he joined the company in 1939, he died aged 71 in October 1983
- October 1975, Alan Cheetham
- February 1980, Roger Lockwood

=== Chairmen ===
- August 1976, J David Abell
- early 1980s, Brian Hoare

== Former employees ==
- David Anderson, chief executive from 2003 to 2005 of Jobcentre Plus, and from 1996 to 2003 of the Yorkshire Building Society (graduate trainee from 1977 to 1980)
- Geoffrey Barford lived at Harston Grange then Caythorpe; his daughter Catherine's wedding in April 1954 was attended by Derek Parker Bowles, father of Andrew Parker Bowles, and John Pearson, 3rd Viscount Cowdray; another daughter married the son of Sir George Briggs, of Harbury, in 1953; his daughter Catherine was a school friend of Margaret Thatcher, starting on the same day in September 1936, and Margaret Thatcher visited Catherine's house in Caythorpe for tea; Margaret Thatcher also had friends in nearby Fulbeck; W G Barford died on 17 November 1976 in Grantham Hospital, aged 80; he had fallen on a frosty path at his house in Stoke Rochford, breaking three ribs
- Edward James Barford, founder, died July 1979; from Deans Court, in Peterborough, the son of Mr James Golby Barford (1861- 29 June 1923) and Florence Mary Moon, and grandson of William Barford (1833–98), he attended Rugby School until the end of 1915; he married Grace Lowrey Stanley, daughter of Albert Stanley, 1st Baron Ashfield (1874-1948), chairman from 1919-47 of London Underground, on Tuesday 30 October 1928 at St Mark's, Mayfair, who with Frank Pick, her father had formed London Underground into what it largely is today; they had daughter born 27 November 1930, Edwina Patricia Lowrey, and boy-girl twins born on 11 May 1933, Clive Julian Stanley and Caroline Juliette Helen; Edward's daughter Edwina married Rudolph Eugene Burger, of Sands Point, New York on 5 December 1956 at the Grosvenor Chapel on South Audley Street, with a bridesmaid being Annabel Morley, daughter of Robert Morley, who also attended; Edward's son Clive married Gay Foster, daughter of Peter Foster, of Cadogan Gardens; Edward's daughter Caroline married Robin St Clair Hardy, from Folkestone, on 27 December 1962 in London; Edward's nephew Pilot Officer Charles Ralph Barford Everard DFM was an air gunner on Avro Lancasters with 83 Sqn at RAF Wyton, with the Pathfinder Force; Charles was the son of Edward's sister, Monica Mary Barford (17 May 1901 – 14 February 1970) and her husband, the chairman of Ellis and Everard, Charles Miskin Everard, bought by Vopak in 2000; on 4 July 1940 Edward's wife, Grace, remarried Herbert John Buckmaster (1881-1966), known for founding Buck's Club in 1919; Edward remarried Mrs Jessie Helen June Johnstone in November 1944; a son was born in late June 1947 Edward divorced on 10 July 1963; Edward remarried Mrs Marian Hubbard, his first wife's sister, on Friday 2 October 1964; Edward lived in London, Great Ponton House (around 1947) and Dane End in Hertfordshire (1950s and 1960s)
- Fitzherbert Wright (1 September 1905 – 10 April 1975) lived at Bridgewater House, Belton, the son of H. FitzHerbert Wright of Yeldersley Hall, Derbyshire, from 1947, when he moved from Bramcote Hills; he was Works director of the company throughout the war, when the Works Manager was Ernest Howlett of 12 Harrowby Lane; in July 1948, he became deputy managing director, with Mr E Odds; he left the company on Thursday 5 May 1949; he was the maternal grandfather of Sarah Ferguson

== See also ==
- Stothert & Pitt
- Thomas Green & Son, also made road rollers in the 1960s
- Unit Rig haul trucks
