= Christopher Perkins (artist) =

English painter

Christopher Edward Perkins (born 21 September 1891 at Peterborough, Cambridgeshire, died Ipswich, Suffolk, 8 April 1968) was a British artist who worked in England and New Zealand.

== Background and education ==
Perkins was the son of John Edward Sharman Perkins and his wife, Margaret Charlotte née Long. His older brother was Frank Perkins. Their father was an agricultural engineer who became managing director of Barford & Perkins.

He was educated at Gresham's School, Holt, then at the Heatherley School of Art in London, in 1907, an academy in Rome in 1908, and the Slade School of Fine Art, where his fellow students included Dora Carrington, Mark Gertler, Stanley Spencer and C. R. W. Nevinson.

== Career ==
By 1914 he launched his professional career, but joined the British army at the outbreak of the First World War, rising to the rank of acting captain. He then returned to painting, and in the 1920s he and his family lived in France. He published an essay, On Museums, in 1925. His work was becoming known, and in 1925 he was helped by Roger Fry and William Rothenstein for a teaching position. He held a major exhibition in London in 1927. In January 1929 he went to teach at the Wellington Technical College in New Zealand. In 1932 he let his contract lapse and moved to Rotorua, where the availability of Māori subjects was an attraction.

Perkins exhibited regularly with the New Zealand Academy of Fine Arts from 1929 to 1933. He held a solo exhibition in 1931. In 1933 he held a substantial exhibition in Sydney, Australia.

Important works include Silverstream brickworks (1930), Taranaki (1931), Activity on the wharf (1931), Meditation (1931), Haka, Maori meeting (1932–34).

Perkins returned to England in February 1934. He served in the army again during the Second World War and also worked as an unofficial war artist. He achieved a reputation as a portrait painter, showing pictures at the Royal Academy of Arts and holding many exhibitions, but never attained the leading position he had had in New Zealand.

== Family ==
Perkins was married on 1 April 1914, to Agnes Berry Shaw. They had three children; Jane Perkins married the mycologist Denis Garrett and published a memoir in 1986, An Artist's Daughter, recounting the family's time in New Zealand.

== Publications ==
- On Museums by Christopher Perkins (St Tropez, 1925)
