= Frank Perkins (engineer) =

British automotive pioneer (1889–1967)

Francis Arthur Perkins (20 February 1889 – 15 October 1967) was a British engineer, businessman, creator of the Perkins Diesel Engine, and founder of Perkins Engines.

== Background and early life ==
Perkins was born in Peterborough, the son of John Edward Sharman Perkins, a manufacturer of agricultural machinery, and his wife Margaret Charlotte Long. John Edward Sharman Perkins, his father, was the son of Thomas Perkins (22 November 1827 - 4 September 1908) of Hitchin and Frances Sharman (10 August 1822 - 10 May 1906) of Melton Mowbray. His father married Margaret Long, daughter of Robert Long of Stondon Manor at Upper Stondon near Shefford, Bedfordshire on 16 May 1888.

His brother Christopher Perkins became a noted artist, and both boys were educated at Gresham's School, Holt, Norfolk. Frank attended Rugby School (1902–1904), Gresham's (1904–1907), and Emmanuel College, Cambridge, (1907–1910) gaining a pass degree in mechanical engineering in 1910.

His father died on 28 June 1942 aged 82. His mother Margaret Charlotte Perkins died on 3 July 1956, aged 95, on Park Crescent.

== War service ==
At the beginning of the First World War, Perkins volunteered for the army and, in October 1914, was commissioned in the Royal Engineers. He served in its 34th divisional company in the Dardanelles, Palestine, and Egypt. He was demobilised in 1918 with the rank of major.

== Career ==
He was a third generation engineer, following both his grandfather and father, who both worked for Barford & Perkins, a family firm that manufactured road construction rollers/compactors, agricultural rollers, and other agricultural machinery. However, before joining the family firm at its Queen Street ironworks in Peterborough, he worked for Lawes Chemicals Ltd.

While later working at Aveling & Porter in Rochester, Kent, Perkins started working on a high-speed, light-weight, diesel engine with Charles Chapman. Before they could complete the project, Aveling & Porter went bankrupt. Convinced that the scheme would be profitable in serving the agricultural tractor market, the two formed their own company, F. Perkins Limited, on 7 June 1932, initially with four employees and based in a rented workshop. Chapman was the technical director and Perkins the chairman.

Perkins would go on building new engines and building the company until 1959, when at the age of seventy he sold a majority stake to his largest customer, Massey Ferguson. He was president of the Society of Motor Manufacturers and Traders (1956–57) and Sheriff of Cambridgeshire and Huntingdonshire (1956–57). He died at his home, Alwalton Hall, near Peterborough, in 1967. There is a plaque to his memory in Alwalton parish church where Henry Royce (1863–1933), co-founder of Rolls-Royce, is also commemorated. A section of the A1139 through Peterborough is named Frank Perkins Parkway.

== Family ==
Frank Perkins had previously lived in Shrewsbury, but moved to Little Offley. On 15 May 1915, while on leave from the Royal Engineers, Perkins married (Susan) Gwynneth Gee, the daughter of Hugh Roberts Williams, of Kingsland, Shropshire in Shrewsbury, at St Mary Magdalene's church in Great Offley in Hertfordshire, by the vicar of All Saints church at Southill, Bedfordshire.

They had one son and three daughters. He lived at Thornhaugh, then moved to Alwalton in 1943.

His son Richard married on 9 September 1950. Richard served in the war, moving to Thornhaugh Hall in December 1950, then lived at Stibbington House from April 1955. Richard had twin daughters, born 4 June 1951.

His daughter Claudia Margaret married (Ernest Henry) Claude Lillicrap on 17 December 1953 in Plymouth, and by 1954 they lived in the Cocos (Keeling) Islands.

His daughter Susan married Capt Edward Gerrard Bartlett, from Bridport who was educated at Corpus Christi College, Cambridge, at St Andrews Alwalton, in the mid-1940s; a granddaughter was born on 10 August 1947, when his daughter lived at Lolworth

His daughter Diana married Philip Goldman on 30 November 1964 in Las Vegas, and lived in Santa Barbara, California.

Gwynneth died on November 10, 1961, aged 70. The service was on 16 November 1961, and was conducted by John Grimes (priest).

He married again on Friday 1 January 1965 at St Andrew's church in Alwalton, to Vera Dixon (née Andrewes), assisted by Arthur Royle (priest). He died in October 1967.

== See also ==
- Perkins Engines
- List of Perkins engines
