= Agricultural & General Engineers =

Defunct British engineering company

Agricultural & General Engineers Limited (AGE) was a holding company formed on 4 June 1919 during a postwar economic "boom" to combine five British engineering companies: Aveling & Porter, E H Bentall, Blackstone, Richard Garrett and J & F Howard. The holding company's business was described to the judge considering its 1932 winding up as: "agricultural, transport, road, constructional and general engineers".

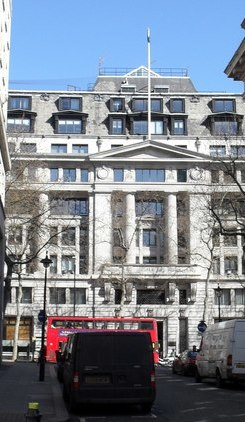
Headquarters and showrooms. The entrance to Aldwych House WC2 completed for AGE in 1926

It paid no dividend on any class of its shares and after a catastrophic trading loss in 1931 and allegations of fraud was liquidated following Barclays Bank's successful application for the winding up order made by the court in April 1932. Many of its subsidiaries were revived as independent businesses.

== Perceived benefits ==
Thomas Lake Aveling and Frank Garrett wanted to bring together a number of agricultural machinery businesses into one strong combine where they would be rationalised and their efficiency improved. They planned to end competition between members in their home market and create a business large enough to compete with the North American firms in export markets.

However, the centralisation of purchasing, which was soon dispensed with, sales and finance in expensive London headquarters created a heavy financial burden not justified by its benefits. As it turned out, the lack of competition in the home market seemed to inhibit innovation and responses to market conditions. Subsidiaries moved rather late from steam to internal combustion engines. The substantial profits of some combine members shored up weaker members and supported the expensive headquarters and that left no income for the shareholders.

== Public listed company ==
Shares were offered to the general public in November 1919 for the funds needed to carry out this large holding company plan and the issue was completed and listed on the London Stock Exchange a week later. The principal subscriptions may have come from the previous owners of the new subsidiaries.

Constituent companies were assigned sectors of the market to reduce competition within the group. The group headquarters were located in AGE's own impressive Aldwych House in Aldwych, London, but most of the member companies were in rural areas. Negotiations for the site in Aldwych were completed in early January 1920, AGE were in occupation in early 1924 and the building was finally completed in 1926.

== Difficult trading ==
Following difficult trading conditions the company's capital was "heavily written down" in 1924 from £8 million to £6.7 million.

== Over-expansion ==
In October 1928 the chairman was able to report that there were close to 10,000 "workpeople" in AGE's employ and the various works covered a total of 350 acres. The sharp slumps and difficult strikes of the 1920s had not been foreseen and with ample capital large extensions were made to the works and plants of the constituent businesses. By 1924 plant and buildings were utilised to less than one-third of their capacity. Speaking to shareholders in October 1928 the chairman hoped they would become fully employed in the 1930s. He also noted another major problem — changes to taxation laws meant losses by subsidiaries could not be offset against profits from sister companies.

In late 1930 the chairman proposed to offer shareholders an opportunity to invest further capital. There is no further mention of this proposal. The 70 per cent holding in Peter Brotherhood was realised in early 1931.

== No dividends ==
In December 1931 many of the main board directors circulated a letter to shareholders pointing out that the profits of the group's three most successful businesses, Blackstone, Barford & Perkins and Aveling & Porter, had never reached shareholders being swallowed up by the heavy expenses of the holding company and the unsuccessful businesses in the group. The holding company paid no dividend on any class of shares for eleven years. These directors asked for an investigation before the full board's now apparently inevitable reconstruction proposals and a formal request for new capital.

== Liquidation ==
There was a counter-suggestion to make the holding company a trading business by buying the businesses of all the subsidiaries but the directors remained divided and in the face of an enormous trading loss for 1931 a court order requested by AGE's bankers for the compulsory winding up of Agricultural & General Engineers Limited was issued 25 April 1932.

The financially healthy component businesses were bought from the receiver and re-established, often by groups of previous owners.

AGE shareholders lost all their investment after waiting more than twelve fruitless years for a report of good profits and their first dividend.

== Member companies ==
source Five original businesses:

- Aveling & Porter, Rochester established 1850 and incorporated 1895
- E.H.Bentall & Co, Maldon established 1805 and incorporated 1909
- Blackstone & Co, Stamford established 1837 as Smith & Ashby and incorporated 1889
- Richard Garrett & Sons, Leiston established 1778 and incorporated 1897
- James & Frederick Howard, Bedford established 1813 and incorporated 1916

Nine other businesses were acquired in 1920:

- Barford & Perkins, Peterborough established 1840
- Peter Brotherhood, Peterborough established 1867 (AGE's holding was 70 per cent)
- Bull Motors, Ipswich established 1898
- Charles Burrell & Sons, Thetford established 1770
- Burrell's Hiring Co
- Clarkes Crank & Forge Co, Lincoln established 1859
- Davey Paxman & Co, Colchester established 1865
- L R Knapp & Co, Clanfield, Oxfordshire established 1745
- E R & F Turner, Ipswich established 1837
