= Aveling and Porter =

Steam engineering company, best known for their road rollers

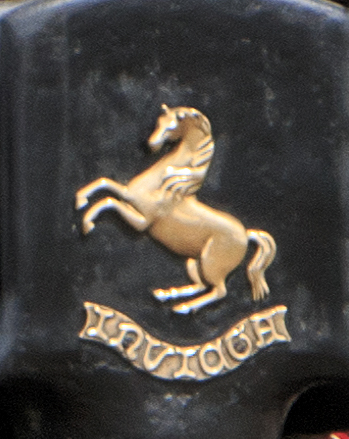
- Type: Private company
- Industry: Agricultural engine and steamroller (road roller) manufacturer
- Founded: 1862; 164 years ago England
- Founders: Thomas Aveling; Richard Thomas Porter
- Headquarters: Strood, United Kingdom

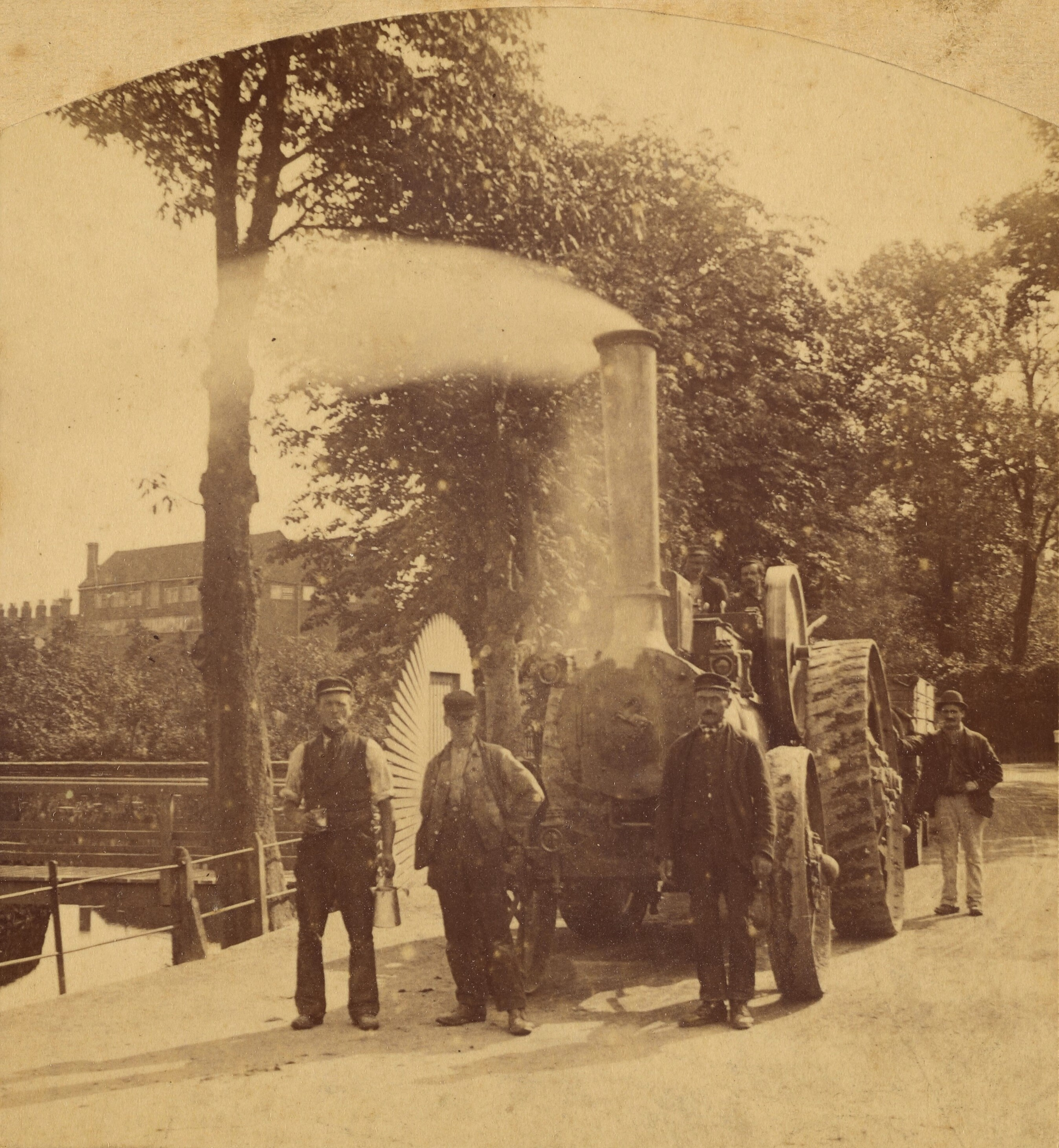
Traction engine (steam tractor) from Aveling and Porter, around 1865

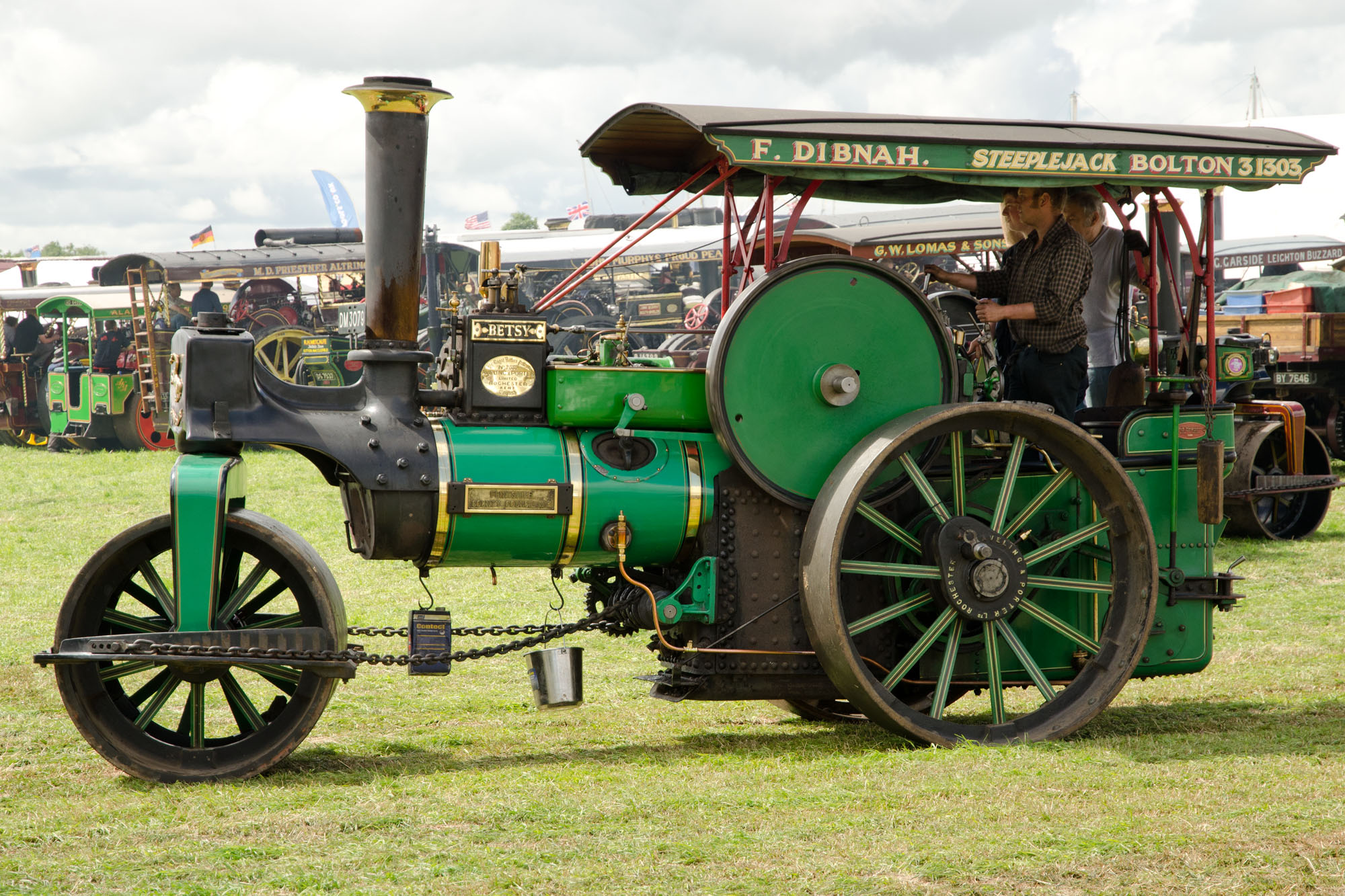
Steamroller (road roller) "Betsy", manufactured by Aveling & Porter in 1912

Aveling & Porter engine called Amy, recorded at Fawley Hill, 19 May 2013

Aveling and Porter was a British agricultural engine and steamroller (road roller) manufacturer. Thomas Aveling and Richard Thomas Porter entered into partnership in 1862, and developed a steam engine three years later in 1865. By the early 1900s, the company had become the largest manufacturer of steamrollers (road rollers) in the world. The company used a rearing horse as its logo (based on the traditional white horse symbol of Kent), along with the motto Invicta (meaning "unconquered"; the traditional motto of Kent).

== Partners ==
=== Thomas Aveling ===
Thomas Aveling was born 11 September 1824 at Elm, Cambridgeshire. In 1851 he was recorded as a farmer and grazier employing 16 men and 6 boys. The business also included a drainage tile works. In 1859, Aveling invented the traction engine when he modified a Clayton & Shuttleworth portable engine, which had to be hauled from job to job by horses, into a self-propelled one. The alteration was made by fitting a long driving chain between the crankshaft and the rear axle. Aveling later invented the steamroller in 1867. Thomas Aveling is regarded as "the father of the traction engine".

Aveling had a reputation as something of a martinet in business, only keeping on the best men. However, he did provide his staff with recreational facilities with a lecture room and mess room. Lectures were delivered on educational, social and political topics with Aveling himself in the chair and participation from the floor encouraged.

=== Thomas Lake Aveling ===
Aveling was the son of Thomas Aveling and his wife, Sarah. He was born on 25 August 1856 in Ruckinge, Kent. When he left school he worked for his father, taking control of Aveling & Porter in 1881. After conversion to a limited liability company in 1895 he became its chairman and managing director until he retired. In 1890 he married Richard Porter's niece, Rosita Marian Porter (1865—1904) daughter of Arthur Porter, manufacturing stationer, and his wife born Anna Maria Atkin. They had two sons, Thomas (1892-1982) and Arthur Francis (1893-1954).

As a prominent local businessman Aveling served on a number of public bodies. He was chairman of the Medway Conservancy, on the board of the Rochester Bridge wardens, and a Justice of the Peace. Like his father he was a member of the ICE and IME and RASE. He was president both of the Smithfield Club and the Agricultural Engineers Association. He was on the board of the Maidstone manufacturers of steam wagons Jesse Ellis Ltd. In 1899 he had a 100 foot (30 m) steam yacht built by Ramage & Ferguson.

Aveling retired from Aveling and Porter in 1928 and died of a heart attack on 5 June 1931 at home in Pettings Court, Ash near Wrotham, Kent.

=== Major Thomas Aveling MC ===
Major Aveling was the son of T.L.Aveling and therefore the grandson of the founder. He was born on 20 January 1892 and during the First World War rose to the rank of Major. He was awarded the Military Cross in 1917.

Major Aveling became a director of A and GE, taking control of Aveling & Porter on his father's retirement in 1928.

=== Richard Thomas Porter ===
Richard Porter's grandfather John (1736–1812) established a grocery business in Sheffield, Yorkshire. His son Thomas married Ann Girdler and they had Richard in around 1835. By 1861 Richard had moved to Enfield, London where he married Marianne Atkin (b. 1840) who had also been born in Sheffield.

In 1862 he went into partnership with Thomas Aveling and subsequently moved to Rochester where in around 1863 he had his first child, Edith. 1871 he is recorded as living at Boley Hill House with his wife, four children and four servants. His occupation is recorded in the census as "Manufacturing Engineer".

Ten year later in 1881 the census locates him at Raleigh, Fox Grove Road, Beckenham with the family and servants as before plus his widowed sister-in-law Mary Studer. He remained in Beckenham, the house being recorded as 26, Foxgrove Road after 1901. He died in 1913. His will was proven the following year when he was shown as "Engineer and Chairman of Aveling and Porter".

== Business ==
=== Thomas Aveling, "Ironfounder and Agricultural Engineer" ===
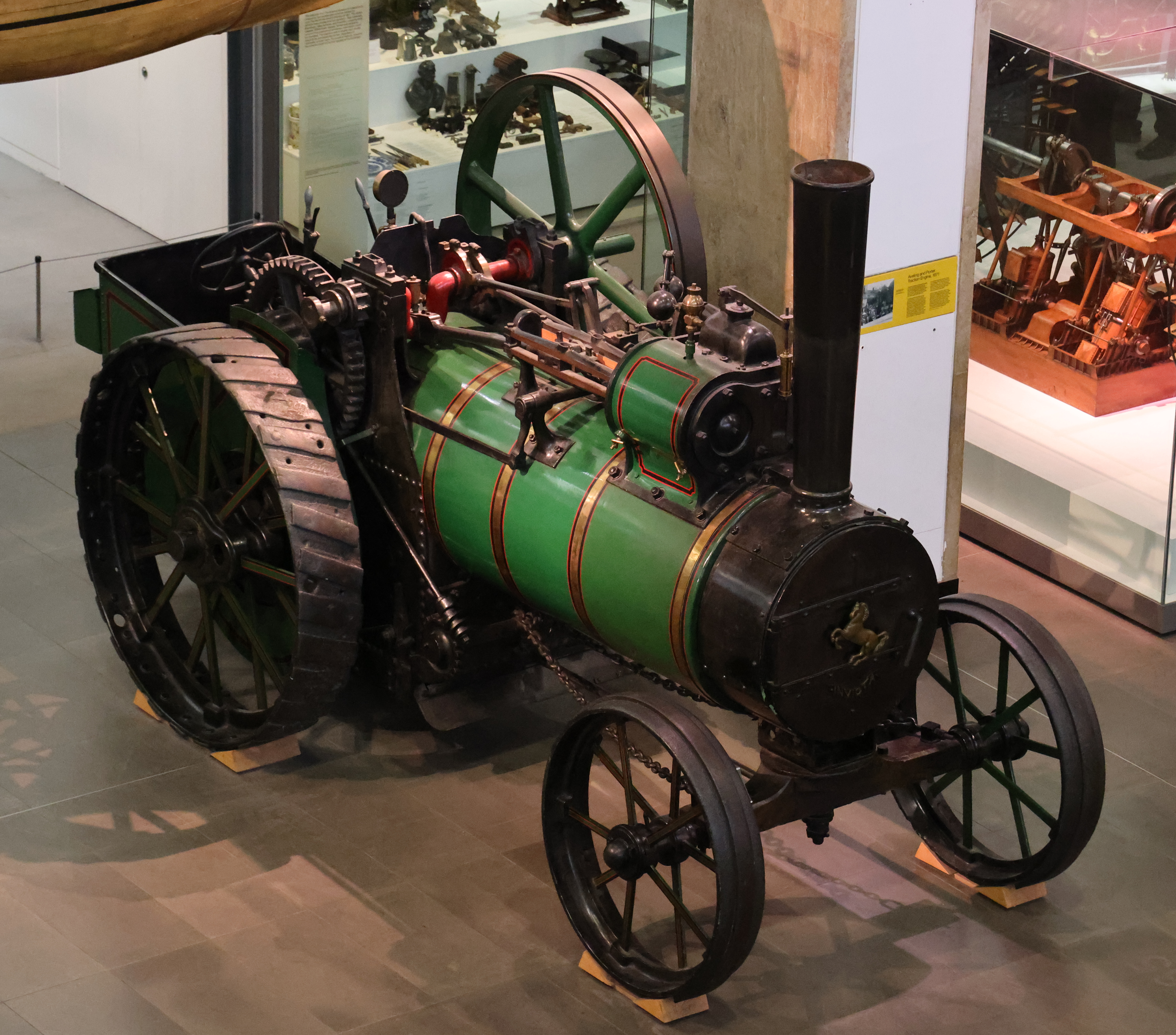
Aveling & Porter no. 721 of 1871 – The earliest surviving A&P engine in the UK in The Science Museum

With help from his father-in-law he was able in either 1850 or 1851 to buy a small millwrighting business at Edward's Yard, Rochester. The business produced and repaired agricultural machinery. Aveling had been concerned by the slow pace of agricultural labour arising from the "ancient and defective construction" of the machines. Starting from 1852 he concentrated on experiments in steam cultivation, culminating in the first steam plough in 1856. The plough was so successful that some Kent farmers presented him with an award of 300 guineas in 1858.

In 1858 Aveling had three premises: 24, High Street, Rochester; 27, Edwards Yard, Rochester; and a small foundry on the site of the future Invicta Works in Strood.

To Aveling, the idea of portable engines being dragged around by teams of horses when they were powerful to move themselves seemed nonsensical. He compared using six horses to pull such an engine as "six sailing vessels towing a steamer" which was "an insult to mechanical science". In 1858 he adapted Clayton, Shuttleworth & Co portables by attaching a chain from the flywheel to a cog on a rear wheel. In the following year he obtained a patent for this which included the specification for devices for varying the tension in the chain and for disengaging it "so that a traction engine can be used as a stationary portable engine at will". His foundry and other premises were too small for the construction of a complete traction engine, so the 1859 locomotive was built for him by Claytons.

His 1860 catalogue describes him as an "Iron Founder and Agricultural Engineer". He was the sole agent in Kent for Fowler's Steam Plough, for Burgess & Key's Patent Reaping Machines. He was an agent (though not apparently sole agent) for Claytons. The front page offers "Every description of Agricultural Machinery supplied at Manufacturer's Prices" and ends with "Castings to order", "Machinery and Steam Engines repaired". Inside was "Aveling's Patent Locomotive Steam Thrashing Train" with engine, threshing machine and straw carrier. Not withstanding his claims as an iron founder, this was made for him by Claytons.

Having solved the propulsion issue, Aveling next turned to steering. His first engines had required a horse in shafts attached to the front wheels for steerage. In 1860 he replaced the horse with a steerable wheel in between the horse shafts. The steersman sat on the back of the shafts and operated a tiller to turn the wheel.

In 1860, the business moved to Strood, on a site adjacent to Rochester Bridge. Preston reports the business as being established by 1861 at which time Aveling was able to build 7 1/2-ton engines.

=== Aveling and Porter up to 1881 ===
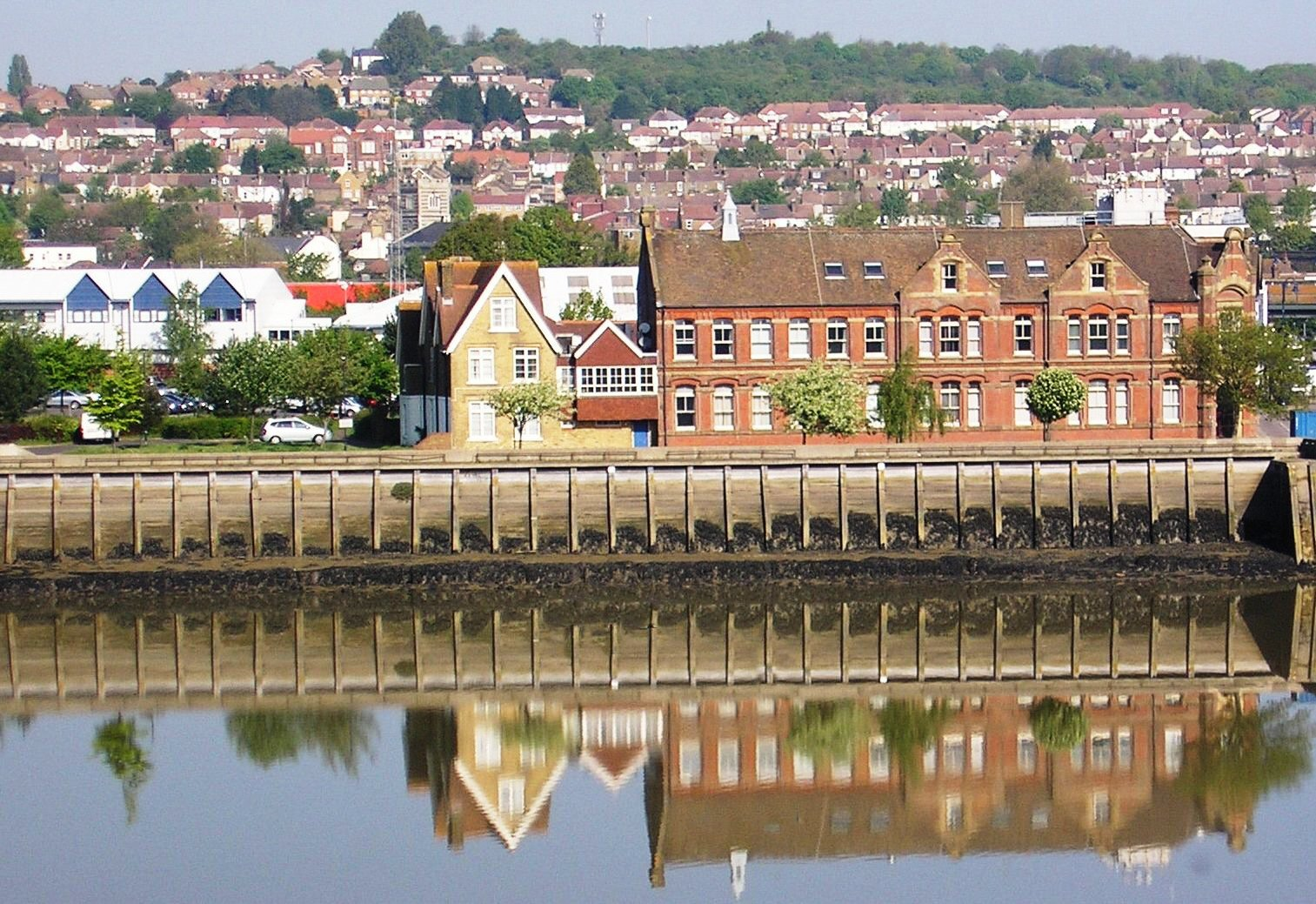
Aveling & Porter building in Strood immediately prior to demolition in 2010

With all this expansion Aveling needed extra capital, and so in 1862 he went into partnership with Richard Porter to create the firm of Aveling & Porter. As well as the capital, Aveling was freed of some of the commercial work.

The firm exhibited their Patent Agricultural Locomotive Engine for Threshing, Ploughing and General Traction Purposes at Battersea in 1862. Aveling moved the cylinder forward from over the firebox to the front of the boiler. The steam jacket that surrounds the cylinders did away with the need for a separate dome (the patent stated that the cylinders were placed within the dome). The jacket reduced condensation, and hence priming, in the cylinders, valve gear and now non-existent supply piping. Ports between the jacket and boiler communicated live steam. The crankshaft was now close to the wheels and the long chain could be first shortened, then disposed of in favour of gears. In 1863 Aveling patented two-speed gearing. Exports at this period were to Prussia and Australia.

Testing traction engines was a public affair, one was tested by driving it through Rochester to the station and back, another by driving it up Frindsbury hill. The local public turned out to see such trials and according to the Chatham News of August 1862 they were "well pleased and altogether favourably impressed". Whilst the local public might have been impressed, more generally opposition to road locomotives was building. The Locomotive Act 1865 (the "red flag" act) was introduced which reduced speeds from the previous limit of 10 miles per hour (16 km/h) to 2 miles per hour (3.2 km/h) in town and 4 miles per hour (6.4 km/h) outside. To enforce the speeds a man had to walk in front carrying a red flag to warn bystanders.

Aveling pursued his interest in steamrollers, producing the first practical example in 1865. It was tested in Military Road, Chatham, Star Hill in Rochester and in Hyde Park, London. The machine proved a huge success. Aveling and Porter steam rollers were exported to Europe and as far afield as India and North America.

Starting in 1868 Aveling & Porter started to supply the government with road locomotives, traction engines and rollers. Up until 1894 they were known as Steam Sappers, since they were built to requirements issues by the Royal Engineers (the Sappers). In 1875, the French government conducted trials of steam sappers and were satisfied enough to order some; subsequently the Russian government conducted extensive trials in 1876 involving soft ground, steep inclines and tests of the ability of a train to be safely brought down hill. The test engine was fitted with a wire cable by which guns could be pulled up hill. Several engines were subsequently purchased and gave satisfactory service in the Russo-Turkish war. Sappers were also sold to Italy.

Technical innovation continued. Unlike railway locomotives where equipment is mounted on a frame, traction engines use the boiler as the frame. This cuts down on weight but introduces stresses and holes for the rivets which could be a source of leaks or failures. In 1870 Aveling introduced horn plates which were extensions of the outer firebox and which carried all the motion, cranks and gearing. Preston regards this as one of Aveling's most important inventions. Also in 1870 he took out a patent on a simplified reversing gear. Eight years later he managed to move the gears between the bearings, not overhanging. The resultant motion was stronger and narrower allowing a more compact engine.

At the Royal Agricultural Society of England (RASE) meeting at Leicester in 1868 Aveling showed "Little Tom", a small engine fitted with a crane. By 1874 the catalogue listed a 2-ton crane engine with a rear differential to permit tight cornering without disconnecting either wheel.

On the 1873 Vienna World's Fair Aveling & Porter were awarded prize medals for their steam-rollers. Also a crane version was to be seen and used for the erection of buildings of Vienna Exposition. In 1874 the Scientific American reported about successful "Improved Road and Farm Locomotive".

=== Aveling and Porter after 1881 ===
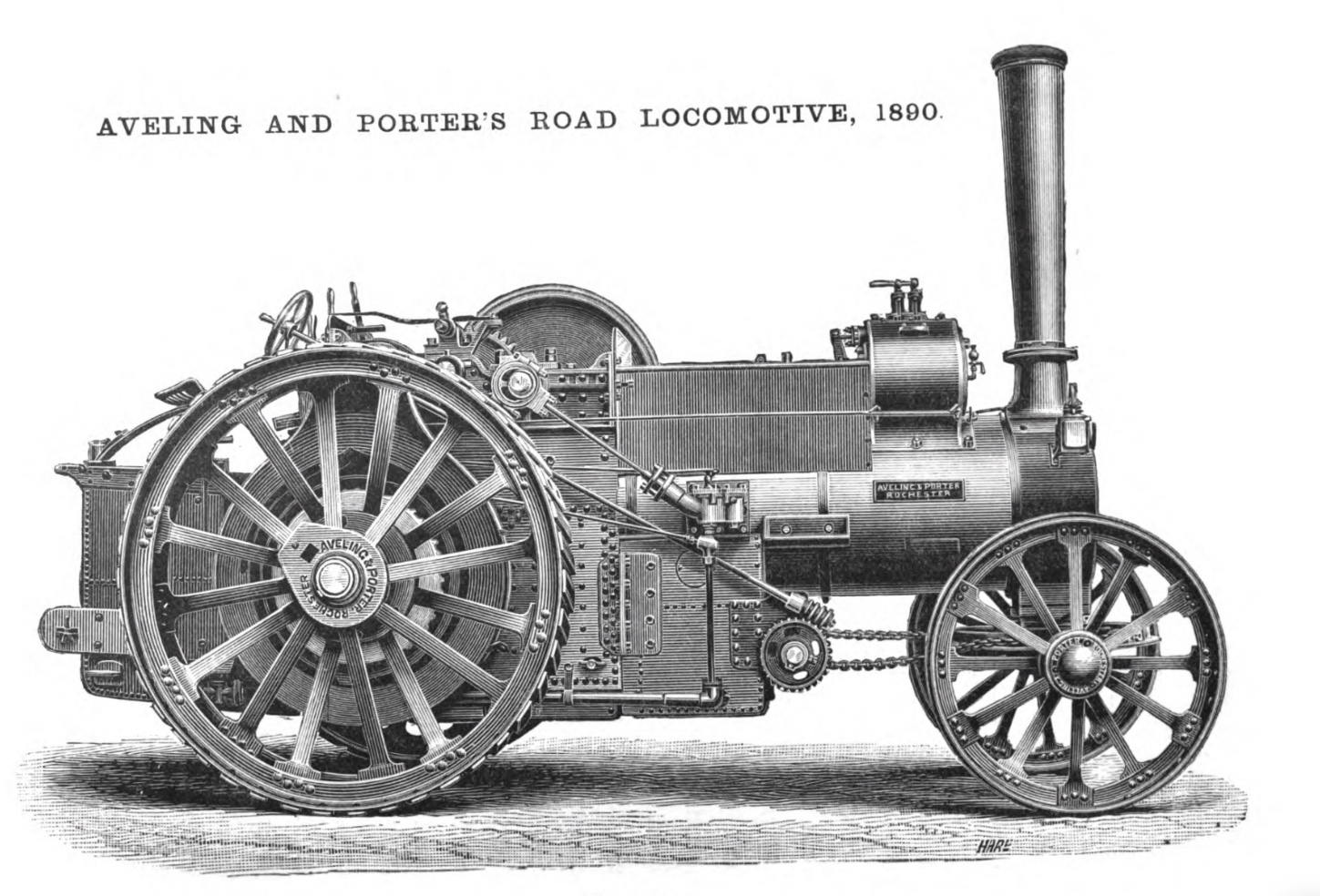
Aveling & Porter (1890)

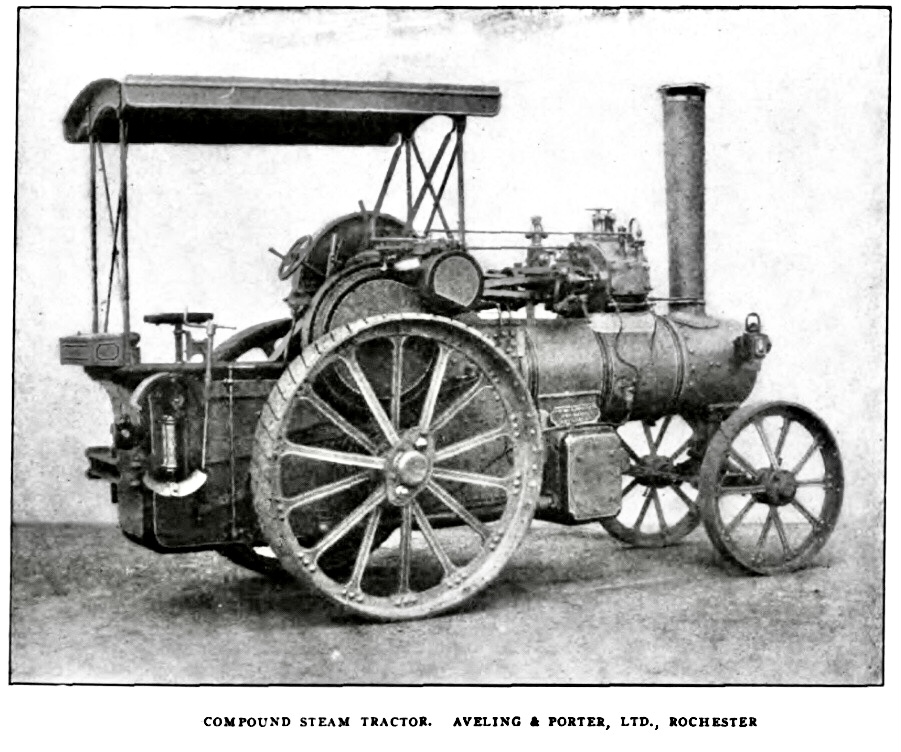
Aveling and Porter (1909)

In 1881 Thomas' son, Thomas Lake Aveling, took over control of the business. Writing in 1899 Henry Smetham commented that the business had "doubled in size about every six years". Employee headcount rose from 400 in 1872 to 1,000 in the mid-1890s and peaked at 1,500. A new office block was built in 1886, which subsequently housed the drawing office. The adjacent foundry business of Messrs Collis and Stace was purchased in 1895 along with the Pelican Yard. Avelings were now making cement manufacturing machinery (including concrete mixers), lamp posts and girders, the latter of which can be seen in the roof of the covered slip at Chatham Historic Dockyard. In the same year the company was incorporated as a limited company. In 1899 Avelings turned out "one large road engine per day", paid £70,000 pa in wages locally using "220 lathes and other tools". In common with most engineering works Avelings made a lot of their own machine tools themselves. However, in 1900 the Public Health Engineer magazine stated that "modern American machinery is rapidly replacing the older forms of lathes and shaping and planing machines".

In 1901 Aveling took part in a joint venture with Vickers Sons and Maxim to build a steel casting facility. Details were finalised and the plant constructed the following year. By 1903 Vickers were reporting poor results due to insufficient orders (in particular field guns) and in March 1904 pulled out, the works subsequently closing in October 1904. A 21-year lease to William Towler (trading as the Medway Steel Company) followed but then the works finally closed.

In the years prior to the First World War the Pelican Yard was built up and used for the assembly and testing of petrol engines for rollers and lorries. On the outbreak of war petrol work stopped and the works were used as a store. Although concentrating on steam rollers (for which there was an expanding market), the company also made traction engines, ploughing engines, steam wagons and tramway locomotives. Other agricultural products were contracted out. In the early twentieth century Aveling & Porter were supplying about 70% of the British market for road rollers.

=== Agricultural & General Engineers ===
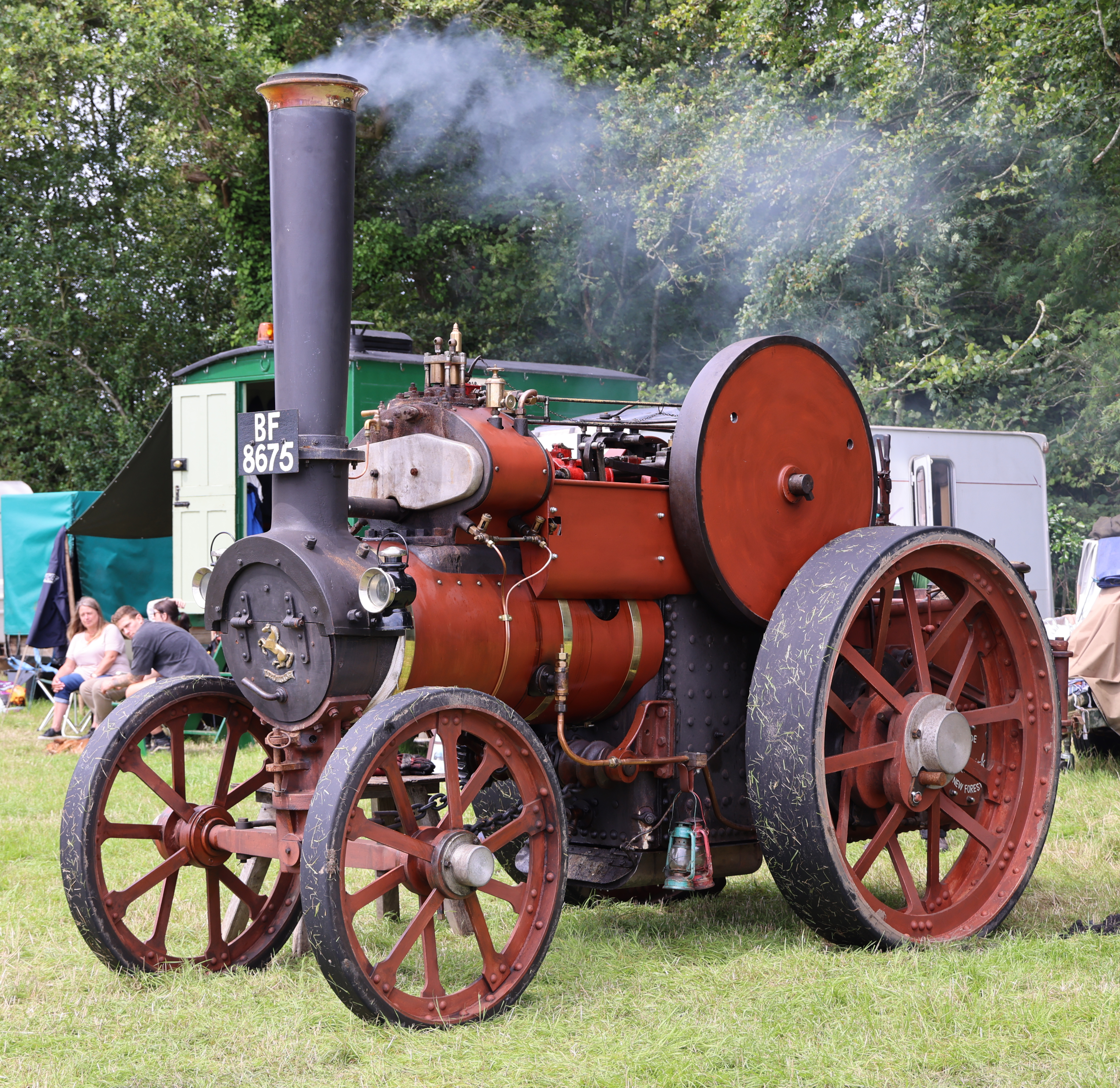
An Aveling & Porter steam tractor exported to Australia in 1929

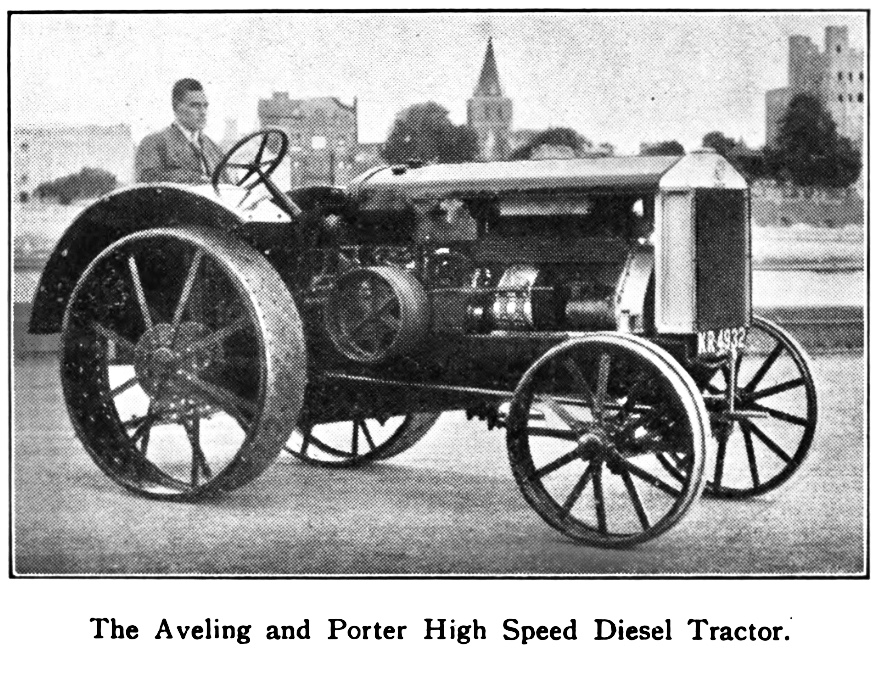
Aveling and Porter 22-38

In 1919 Aveling and Porter joined the Agricultural & General Engineers (AGE) combine. The combine had been formed at the joint instigation of T.L.Aveling and Archibald Maconochie. As well as Aveling & Porter, AGE took over James and Frederick Howard Ltd and twelve other companies. Production of Aveling and Porter steam wagons was transferred to Richard Garrett & Sons.

The holding company's overheads exceeded any savings of scale. The combine started to drag down A&P, and by 1928 headcount was down and short-time working had been implemented. In 1932 AGE went into receivership, bringing down Aveling and Porter with it. In the aftermath Aveling and Porter combined with Barford & Perkins in 1933 to form Aveling-Barford which continued to make steam and motor rollers. The rescue, part-funded by Ruston & Hornsby of Lincoln, involved the firm moving to Grantham, Lincolnshire, from the Rochester site. After the Second World War the company continued to make motor and steam rollers as well as expanding into other construction equipment.

The sole remaining building on the Strood site was demolished by Medway Council in 2010.

Aveling-Barford is now part of the Wordsworth Holdings Group, a family-owned company. The company is based in Grantham, and still trades under the name Barford which uses a modern version of the Aveling-Barford "prancing horse" logo. Barford manufacturers and sells a wide range of site dumpers.

== Products ==
Aveling and Porter built more steam rollers than all the other British manufacturers combined. They also built traction engines and steam wagons. Just under 600 of the company’s various steam engines survived to enter preservation.

The company also built a few pairs of ploughing engines. A pair of which (unique in the UK) survive in the collection at the Thursford Steam Museum at Thursford, Norfolk. The Thursford Collection includes 27 Aveling & Porter steam tractors and rollers and 16 more by other manufacturers. Aveling and Porter produced a single showman’s engine in 1904 but no orders resulted.

Another example of Aveling and Porters engineering skill can be seen in the massive covered slips at Chatham Dockyard. These vessels pre-date the great London train sheds of St. Pancras, King's Cross and Paddington—traditionally understood to be the oldest and largest metal framed structures of the time.

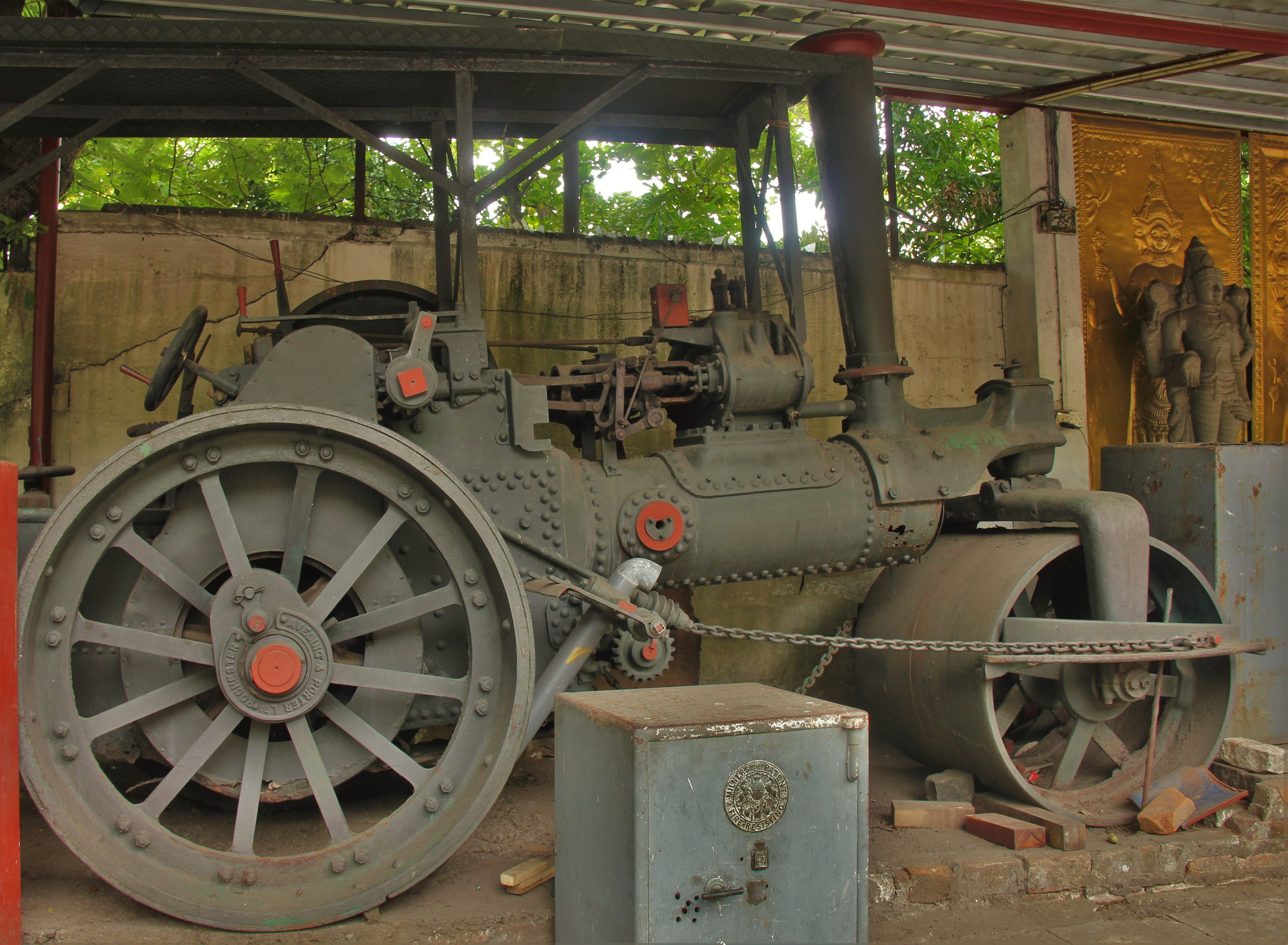
Steamroller by Aveling and Porter from early 20th century. On display at the Gangaramaya Temple in Colombo.

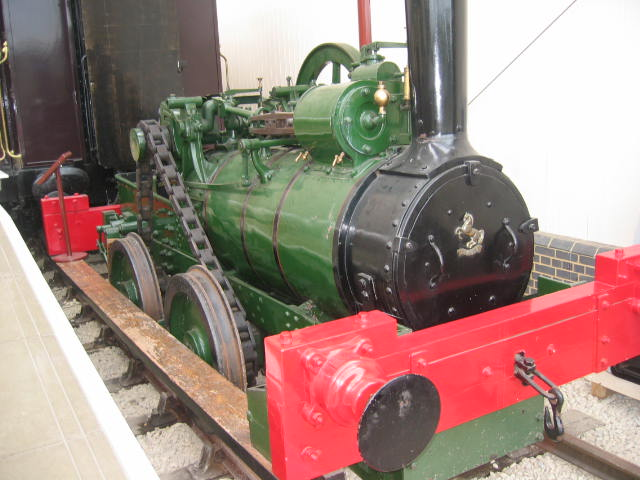
Traction engine-based railway locomotive, as used on the Brill Tramway

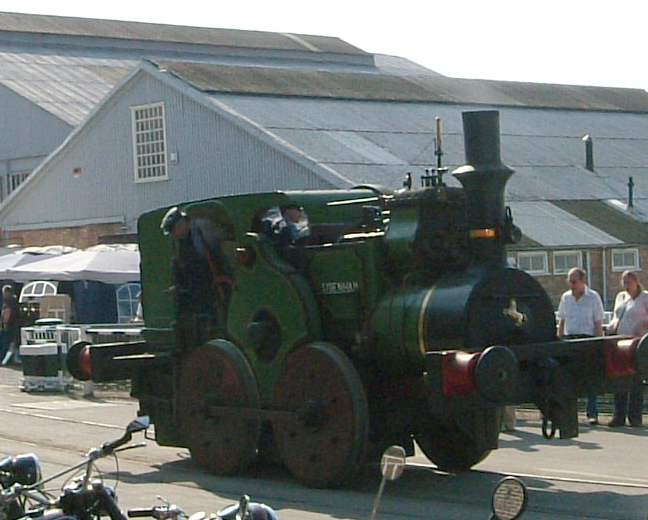
Early Aveling & Porter Loco "Sydenham" in Chatham Dockyard

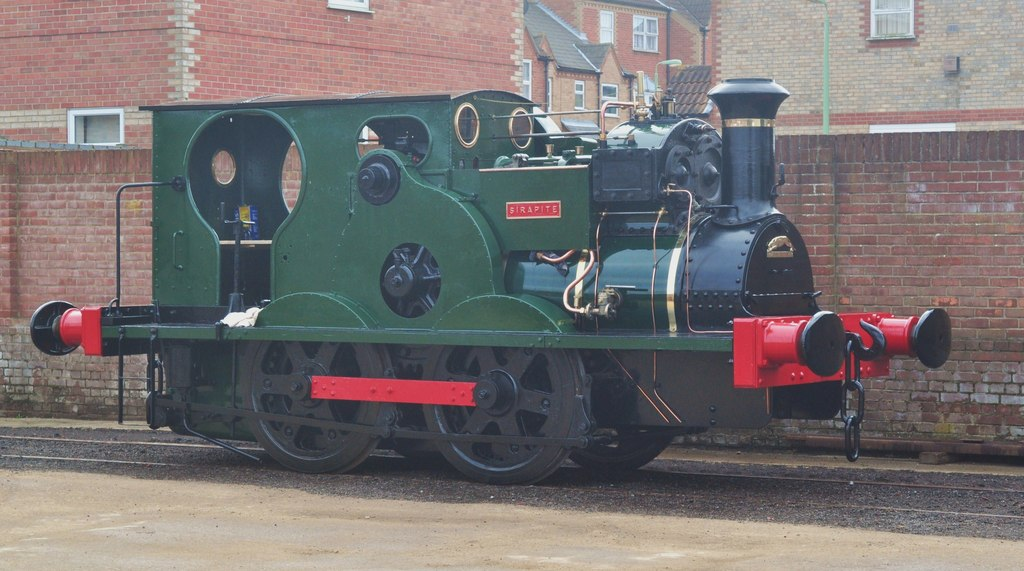
A&P locomotive "Sirapite" at the former Leiston Works of Richard Garrett & Sons

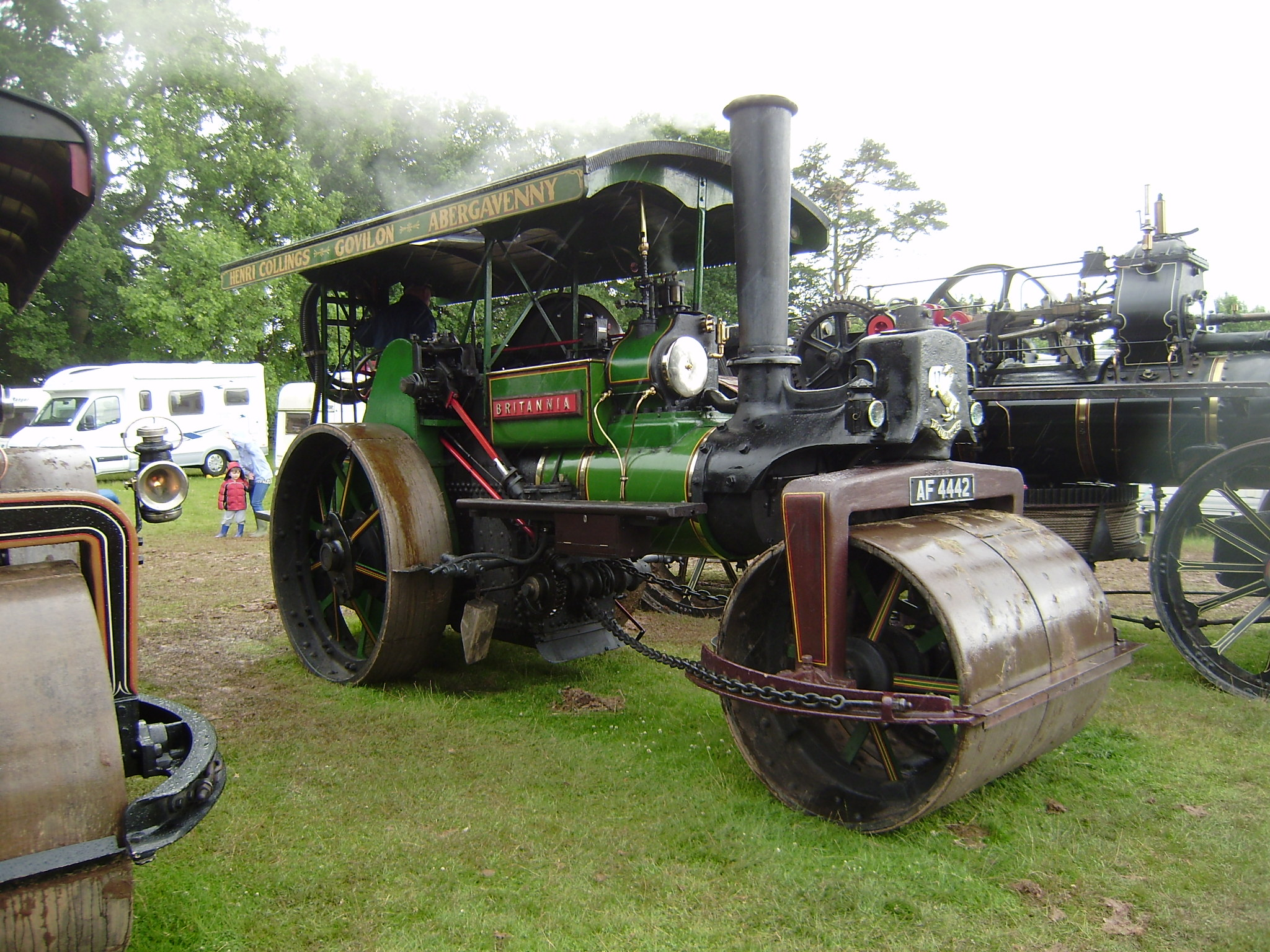
Aveling & Porter roller "Britannia" (s/n 8548) at Bromyard Gala show, Herefordshire 2008

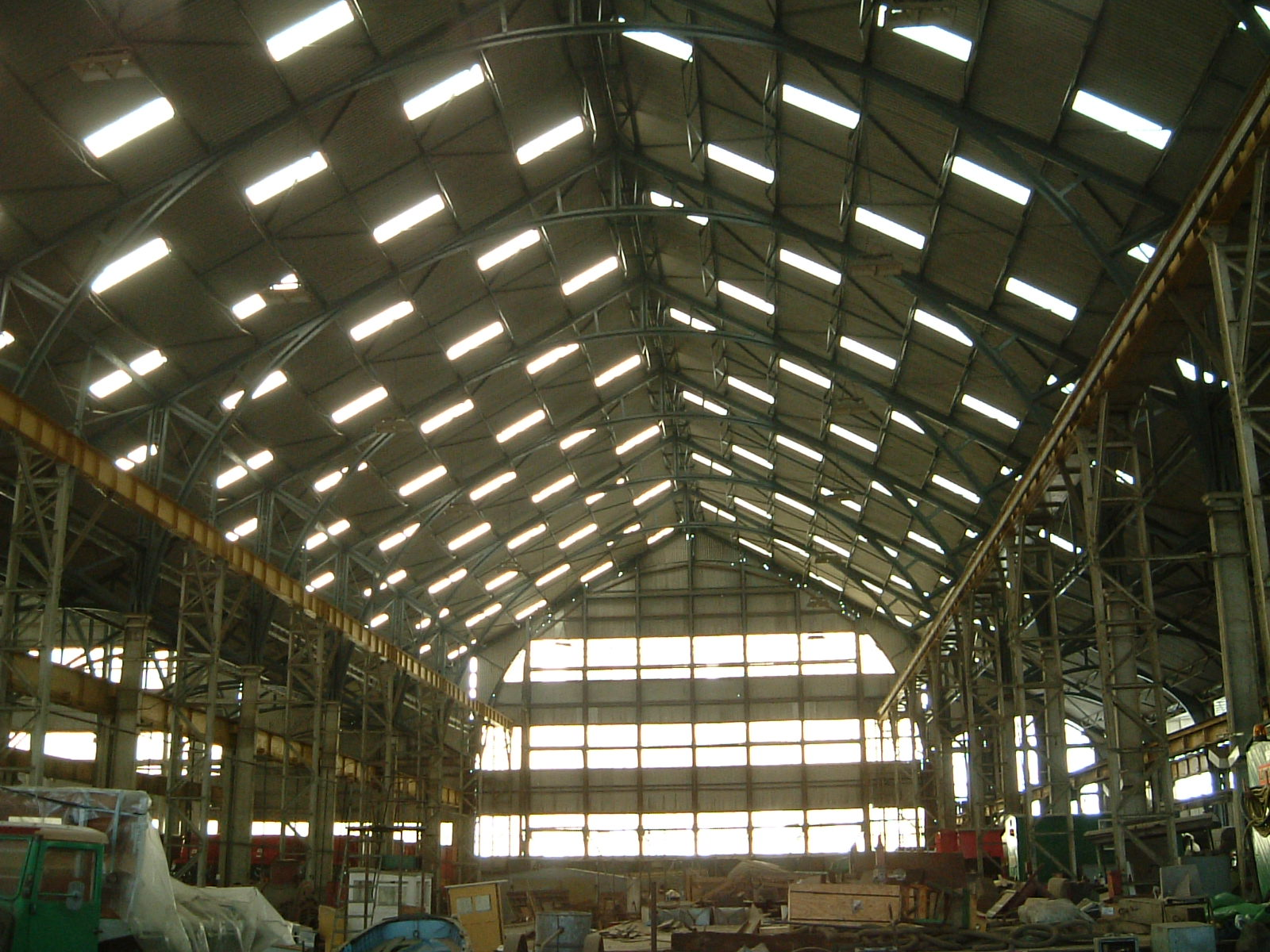
Inside the covered slips at Chatham Historic Dockyard

=== Locomotives ===
Aveling & Porter built several small shunting / tram locos based on their traction engines. They were basically traction engines with flanged wheels and no steering. Their advantages were that they were cheap to manufacture (and to design in the first place) and they could be operated with minimal training by someone who was familiar with traction engines.

Works Number	Places worked/been/owner	Name	Arrangement	Gauge	Tractive Effort(lb)	Weight	Status	Date Built	Location	Reference
	Booth Bros, Borstal		2-2-0WT	3 ft 6in						
	Nether Heyford		0-4-0WT	Std						
	Totternhoe Lime & Stone Co		2-2-0WT	Std						
	Johnsons Cements Works, Greenhithe		0-4-0WT	Std						
121	Grays Quarries Co Ltd, Essex			Std						
129	Chatham Dockyard, Kent/Devonport Dockyard, Devon/Portsmouth Dockyard, Hampshire; Lodge Hill & Upnor Railway, Kent		2-2-0T	Std				1865		
151	Grays Quarries Co Ltd, Essex			Std						
167	Grays Quarries Co Ltd, Essex			Std						
182	Chatham Dockyard, Kent/Devonport Dockyard, Devon/Portsmouth Dockyard, Hants; Lodge Hill & Upnor Railway, Kent		2-2-0T	Std				1866		
218	Chatham Dockyard, Kent/Devonport Dockyard, Devon/Portsmouth Dockyard, Hants; Lodge Hill & Upnor Railway		2-2-0T	Std				1866		
221	Brassey, Wythes & Lucas – East London Railway Contract		0-4-0WT	Std	(6 hp)			17/9/1866		
235	Brassey, Wythes & Lucas – East London Railway Contract		0-4-0WT	Std	(10 hp)			23/10/1866		
		Steam Sapper No. 1						1868		
524	William Jay – Hyde Park Contract		0-4-0WT	Std	(6 hp)			13/1/1870		
718	Chatham Dockyard; Lodge Hill & Upnor Railway		2-2-0T	Std				1871		
719	Chatham Dockyard; Lodge Hill & Upnor Railway		2-2-0T	Std				1871		
		Steam Sapper No. 2						1871		
807	Wotton Tramway/Brill Tramway (No 1); Nether Heyford Brickworks (Northamptonshire); War Department; Neasden Depot; Museum of British Transport, Clapham; London Transport Museum		0-4-0T	Std	(6 nhp)	9.4 tons	Static Display	24/1/1872	Buckinghamshire Railway Centre – On loan from London Transport Museum	
822	Lodge Hill & Upnor Railway	Steam Sapper No .3	2-2-0T	Std				1872		
829	Lodge Hill & Upnor Railway	Steam Sapper No .4	2-2-0T	Std				1872		
830	Lodge Hill & Upnor Railway	Steam Sapper No. 5	2-2-0T	Std				1872		
831	Lodge Hill & Upnor Railway	Steam Sapper No. 6	2-2-0T	Std				1872		
832	Lodge Hill & Upnor Railway	Steam Sapper No. 7	2-2-0T	Std				1872		
846	Wotton Tramway/Brill Tramway (No 2); Nether Heyford Brickworks (Northamptonshire); War Department		0-4-0T		(6 nhp)	9.4 tons	Used as spares for 807, then scrapped	June 1872		
939	Lodge Hill & Upnor Railway	Steam Sapper No. 8	2-2-0T	Std				1873		
1023	Chatham Dockyard; Lodge Hill & Upnor Railway		2-2-0T					1874		
1607	Scout Moor Quarry, Edenfield, Lancashire	Excelsior		3 ft				1880	Hollycombe Steam Collection	
3567	Beadle Bros, Erith, Kent; Erith Oil Works; Enfield Veteran and Vintage Vehicle Society; Luton; Buckinghamshire Railway Centre	Sydenham	0-4-0WT	Std	9,033		Operational	1895	Chatham Dockyard – On loan from Buckinghamshire Railway Centre, Quainton	
3592	Tom Price, Newman in northern Wairarapa; Tom Price, Petone; Puketapu Sawmilling Co, Matapuna; NZ Powell Wood Process Co., Rangataua; Ellis & Burnand Ltd., Ongarue; Marton Sash & Door Ltd	The Squirt	0-4-0WT				Probably scrapped	1896		
3766	Glenlossie-Glenlivet Distillery, Elgin		0-4-0WT				Replaced by 11042 in 1924	1896		
4006	Balmenach Distillery, Cromdale		0-4-0WT				replaced 1936			
4141	G Geddes, Mosstowie Quarry, Elgin		0-4-0WT							
4347	Norway (used in harbour or breakwater projects)	Putten	0-4-0WT	3 ft or 3 ft 6in				1893		
4371	Pepper & Son Ltd, Amberley, Sussex		0-4-0WT	Std			Scrapped 1958	1899		
4399	Aveling-Barford Ltd., Grantham		0-4-0WT					1899		
4445	South Suburban Gas Co, Lower Sydenham Gas Works	Bull Dog	0-4-0WT					1899		
4537	APCM – Stone Works		0-4-0WT					1900		
4780	Croydon Gas & Coke Co – Waddon Marsh Gas Works; South Eastern Gas Board		0-4-0WT	Std						
5935	London Brick Company: Newton Longville Works; Elstow; Calvert Works		0-4-0WT					1905		
6158	Gypsum Mines Ltd, Mountfield, Sussex; Richard Garrett & Sons, Leiston; Sir William McAlpine	Sirapite	0-4-0WT	Std		18 tons 10cwt	Operational	1906	Long Shop Museum, Leiston	
6369	Mitchell & Butler Brewery, Smethwick	John Barleycorn						1907		
8372	EMGB, Grimesthorpe		0-4-0WT	Std				1914		
8800	Vickers Armstrong Ltd, Erith; British Oil and Cake Mills, Erith; Hollycombe; Buckinghamshire Railway Centre, Quainton	Sir Vincent	0-4-0WT	Std	(18 hp)		In operational condition as of 2025	1917	Private railway, Scotland	
9449	Holborough Cement Co. Ltd., Kent; Bluebell Railway; Buckinghamshire Railway Centre; Chinnor and Princes Risborough Railway; Battlefield Line, Shackerstone	Blue Circle	2-2-0WT	Std			Returned to steam in 2025 after overhaul	1926	Nene Valley Railway	
11042	Glenlossie-Glenlivet Distillery, Elgin		0-4-0WT	Std				1924		
11087	Totternhoe Lime & Stone Co		0-4-0WT	Std				1925		

=== Steam Sappers ===
Prior to 1868 the Royal Engineers had been experimenting with steam traction. Early examples had used modified railway locomotives mounted on a variety of wheels to traverse soft land. The locomotives were far too heavy to be effective, on one occasion breaking through the road near the Royal Arsenal at Woolwich into cellars below. With the development of the relatively lightweight traction engine specifically for road use, the Royal Engineers turned their attention to them.

The first Steam Sapper was ordered from Aveling and Porter in 1868. Steam sapper number 1 was required to operate a 36-inch (910 mm) circular saw, grindstone, lathe and joiner as well as drawing 5 tons up a 1 in 12 slope. It performed this, but was more than a quarter of a ton over the specified maximum weight of five tons. The heaviest field gun in use at that time was the 64 pdr Armstrong breech loading siege gun weighing 95 long cwt (10,600 lb; 4,800 kg). Since pontoon bridges would be constructed to support this gun, steam sappers were required to weigh less than the gun so that they would not overload the bridges. Steam sapper number one had a loading on the rear wheels less than this, and so was accepted.

During 1869 military exercises in Dover included drawing a battery of guns from the railway station up to the castle, a high, steep hill. In September 1870 the 4 wheels (3 ft 6in front, and 5 ft rear) were fitted with bolted on steel and india rubber blocks (L. Sterne & Co Patent), and on 23 September it was subject to another successful trial. Towing a total of 13 tons on two "lorries" (trailers), it left the Rochester works, ascending the 1 in 12 Star Hill, and delivering the load to Chatham dockyard where it was driven across rough ground of cinder, bricks, clinker, stones and iron designed to test the rubber blocks. In a further trial in October it drew 3 "trollies" weighing in total 16 tons 16 cwt up Star-Hill (part of which was 1 in 11 slope), including stopping and making a complete turn on the steepest part of the hill in a circle of 23 feet. It then proceeded to 1 in 10 Chatham Hill which was described as slippery, and it had to detach the last trailer, and ascended towing the other two (12 tons 6 cwt). It was then tested on soft ground, where it drew trucks up to 6 tons, where a normal traction engine got stuck without a truck, and then after bolting paddles on the wheels it towed the normal traction engine out.

Steam sapper number 2 was purchased in 1871. This was a lighter and more powerful engine than number one. The engine was rated 7 nhp (compared to 6), used spur gears for the drive (compared to chain) and used a differential drive on the rear axle to avoid the need to disconnect one wheel which the earlier locomotive had required. On test it drew 15.5 long tons (15,700 kg) up the 1 in 11 gradient of Star Hill, Rochester.

In late 1871 the Inspector General of Fortifications was informed by the RE Committee that only Aveling and Porter had a suitable engine. As a result, five more were ordered in 1872.

Some of the steam sappers were fitted with railway wheels. Yeatman records steam sappers numbers 3–7 as being 2-2-0T locomotives on the Lodge Hill and Upnor Railway. Yeatman's editor, Mullett and Nowers disagree. Aveling-Barford have checked their records and have no records of any steam sappers being supplied other than for road use. Nowers states that sapper number 9 was fitted with railway wheels for a trial and that sapper number 12 was purchased with them. In 1873, in preparations for the Ashantee expedition, it is recorded "A second locomotive, called a steam sapper, arrived at Woolwich yesterday from Chatham, accompanied by several waggons to form a train, either for running upon rails or common roads, both engine and waggons being provided with flanged wheels for use if necessary". One of the two steam sappers planned to go to Ashanti was not shipped, and in October 1874 there is an account of a steam sapper propelling three "Ashentee" rail trucks containing dignitaries during an artillery demonstration in Eastbourne. In the table below possible railway use is recorded, in most cases this would be upon the LH&UR.

Sapper number 8 was dismantled and sent in parts to Cape Coast Castle in the Gold Coast to take part in the Ashanti Campaign of 1873. The absence of decent roads made its use as a traction engine unsatisfactory. However it performed well as a stationary engine, particularly working the saw bench.

Sapper number 24 was the last Aveling and Porter engine to be called a steam sapper. It was used by the newly formed Balloon Corps in 1885. The locomotive and another one ordered shortly afterwards were used to haul "balloon trains". Each train consisted of five wagons carrying gas cylinders, a water cart, and a wagon for the balloon, basket and winch. Balloons were normally employed as elevated observation platforms and as such were tethered though observers were trained in how to handle free flight in case the balloon broke away.

Aveling and Porter engines continued to be purchased up to 1899 though losing ground to Fowlers. At least one engine saw service in the Boer War and four were still in service in 1906 with the Army Service Corps which progressively took over responsibility for transport from the Royal Engineers between 1903 and 1906.

Works Number	Sapper Number	Nominal horsepower	Delivery date	Type	Unit	Remarks
437	1	6	14 Dec 1868	Traction engine	War Office, Chatham	Named "Prince Arthur"
554		6	20 Oct 1870	Portable engine	War Office, Shoeburyness	
684	2	6	21 Sep 1871	Traction engine	War Office, Chatham	
722	9	6	Jan 1872	Agricultural	War Office, Shoeburyness	Fitted with railway wheels for a trial in 1873
822	3	6	28 Mar 1872	Road locomotive	SME, Chatham	
829	4	6	1 Apr 1872	Road locomotive	SME, Chatham	
830	5	6	10 Apr 1872	Road locomotive	SME, Chatham	An illustration shows it fitted with railway wheels.
831	6	6	17 Apr 1872	Road locomotive	SME, Chatham	
832	7	6	26 Apr 1872	Road locomotive	SME, Chatham	
939	8	6	27 Jun 1873	Crane engine	SME, Chatham	Sent to Africa in the Ashanti expedition.
1306	11	8	1877	Traction engine	SME, Chatham	
1307	10	8	1877	Traction engine	SME, Chatham	
1316	12	6	17 Apr 1877	Traction engine	SME, Chatham	Purchased with railway wheels
1317	13	6	1877	Traction engine	SME, Chatham	
1424	14	8	30 Apr 1878	Traction engine	Dockyard, Woolwich	
1425	15	8	26 Apr 1878	Traction engine	Dockyard, Woolwich	
1426	16	8	30 Apr 1878	Traction engine	Dockyard, Woolwich	
1427	17	8	20 May 1878	Traction engine	Dockyard, Woolwich	
1529		8	1879	Traction engine	Curragh Camp, Ireland	
1593	20	8	1880	Traction engine	Bermuda	
1611	21	6	15 Jun 1880	Traction engine	War Office, Chatham	
1621		6	12 Aug 1880	Traction engine	Curragh Camp, Ireland	
1879	22	6	31 Jul 1883	Traction engine	SME, Chatham	
2051		8	1885	Road locomotive		
2058	24	8	1885	Crane engine	Balloon Corps, Chatham	Named "Balloon". Fitted with dynamo.
2060		6	27 May 1885	Road locomotive	Balloon Corps, Chatham	Possibly 1886. Possibly 8 hp.
2095		6	1886	Road locomotive	Chatham	
2105	?	6	1886	Traction engine	Chatham	Possibly 1885. Fitted with dynamo and spring wheels. Called a steam sapper but number unknown.
2465		4	23 May 1889	Traction engine	RLC*, Chatham	*Road Locomotive Committee. Possibly built 1880. Fitted with dynamo.
2482		6	26 Mar 1889	Semi portable	War Office, Chatham	
2749		12	13 Jan 1891	Semi portable	Royal Arsenal, Woolwich	
2763		7	22 Jan 1891	15T Roller	Royal Arsenal, Dublin	
2940		5	26 Nov 1891	10T Roller	Royal Arsenal	
3220	23	6	29 Aug 1893	15T Roller	SME, Chatham	Convertible
4422		10	4 Nov 1899	Road locomotive		"King" type. Sent to South Africa for the Boer War.

== In fiction ==
Three Aveling and Porter products are found in The Railway Series books by the Rev. W. Awdry and the TV series based on the books: George the Steamroller, Fergus the Railway Traction Engine, and Buster the Steamroller.

The road roller used in the 1953 comedy film The Titfield Thunderbolt, which has a duel with a railway locomotive, was one of their engines (works number 5590, Maid Marion).
