= Perkins Engines =

Diesel engine manufacturer

Perkins Engines Company Limited

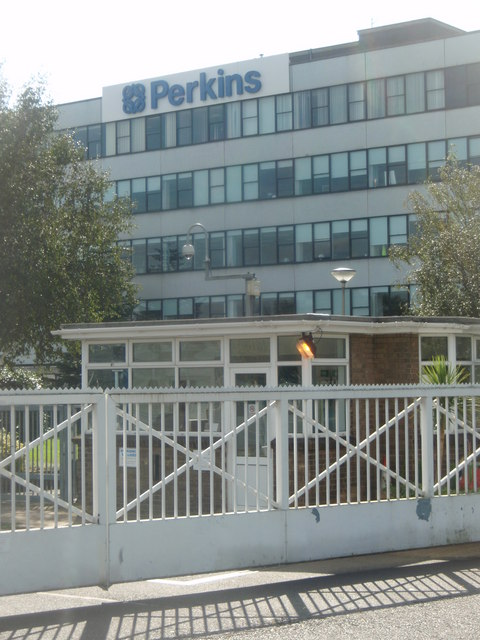
- Perkins headquarters in Peterborough
- Type: Subsidiary
- Industry: Machine industry
- Founded: 1932; 94 years ago
- Founder: Frank Perkins
- Headquarters: Eastfield, Peterborough, England
- Area served: Worldwide
- Products: Diesel engines Gas engines
- Parent: Caterpillar Inc.
- Website: www.perkins.com

Perkins Engines Company Limited is primarily a diesel engine manufacturer for several markets including agricultural, construction, material handling, power generation, and industrial. It was established in Peterborough, England in 1932 and has been a subsidiary of Caterpillar Inc. since 1998. Over the years, Perkins has expanded its engine catalogue, producing thousands of different engine specifications including diesel and petrol engine automotives.

== History ==
=== High-speed diesel engines ===
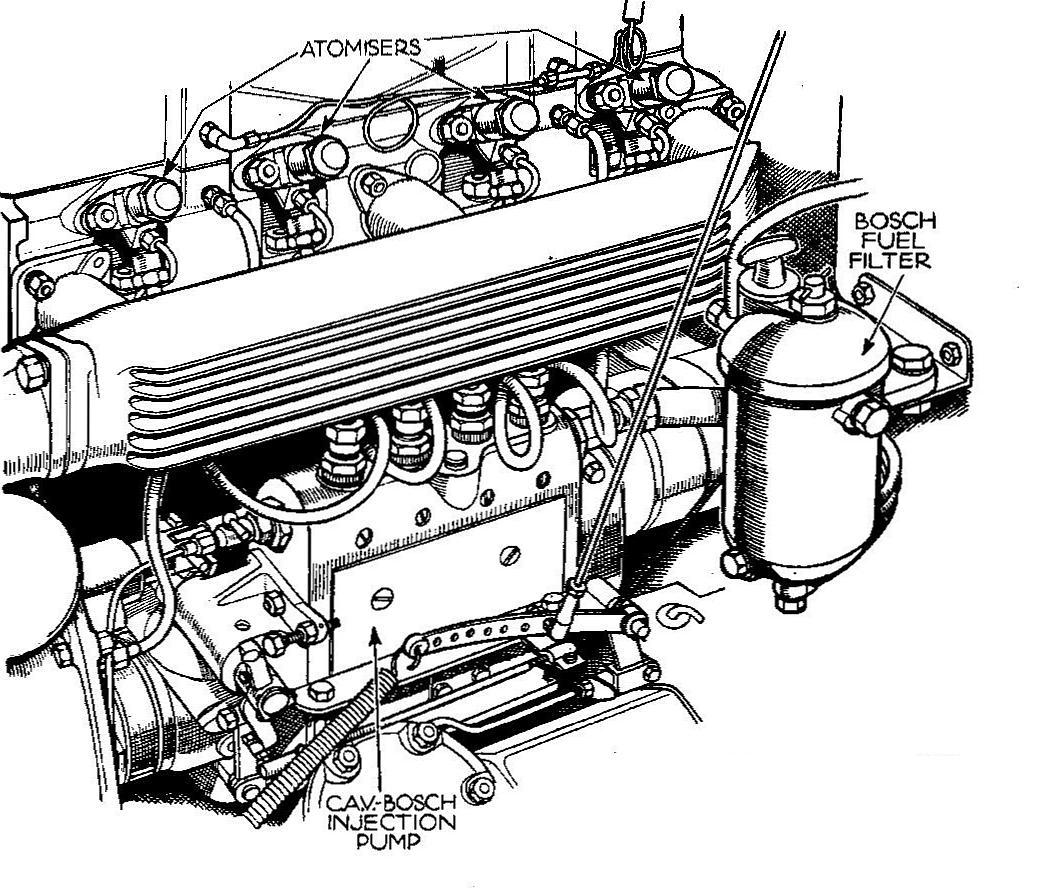
A 1935 Perkins diesel car engine (Autocar Handbook, 13th ed.)

F. Perkins Limited, established on 7 June 1932, was founded by Frank Perkins and Charles Wallace Chapman, on Queen Street, Peterborough, to design and manufacture high-speed diesel engines. Chapman was the design engineer (technical director) and company secretary and had a ten percent shareholding in the company. He continued working at F. Perkins Limited for more than a decade before re-joining the Royal Navy Reserve, though remaining a consultant to the company. Frank Perkins obtained further initial support from directors Alan J. M. Richardson and George Dodds Perks.

Before Chapman and Perkins, the diesel engine was considered a heavy and slow-revving workhorse, lacking performance. Chapman's concept was the high-speed diesel – an engine that could challenge petrol-driven ones as the primary motor power. The company's first high-speed diesel engine was Perkins' four-cylinder Vixen, which made its debut in 1932. In October 1935, Perkins became the first company to hold six world diesel speed records for a variety of distances, set at the Brooklands race track in Surrey. Sales were strong and by the time of World War II, the company made two series of engines, P4 and P6. Soon after the war, the company went public, and established a number of licensees for local manufacturing and sale.

=== Massey Ferguson ===
F. Perkins Ltd was purchased by its largest customer, Massey Ferguson, in 1959, with Perkins keeping its separate identity and branding. In 1990, Massey Ferguson took over Dorman Diesels of Stafford merging it with Perkins to form Perkins Engines (Stafford) Ltd. In 1984, Perkins acquired Rolls-Royce Diesels of Shrewsbury, continuing to supply British Rail with engines for its diesel multiple units until the site closed in 2002. In 1986 Perkins acquired L Gardner & Sons to complement their line of lighter diesel engines. Gardner exited the truck engine market immediately, although production for the bus, coach and marine markets continued under the Gardner brand. In 1994, the whole of Perkins was bought by LucasVarity, who immediately closed down the Gardner brand and sold off the Barton Hall Motor Works in Patricroft, Eccles, Manchester.

Development continued and Perkins updated its engines to meet stricter emissions rules while developing new engine series for power generation and forklift trucks. Manufacturers such as Dodge, Ford, Grosspal, and Ranquel used Perkins engines in their diesel-driven products for more than two decades. Other manufacturers including GEMA, Araus, Bernardin and Rotania used Perkins impellers for harvesters at length.

=== Argentina and Perkins Argentina/Pertrak ===
Pertrak was founded in 1961 as a licensee of Perkins Engines of England, and was dedicated to the manufacture of engines for pickups, trucks, and tractors. The most productive period for the company was in the 1970s when they produced 200,000 engines. In 2010, the last engine was made in Ferreyra, Córdoba, when the licence was dropped. Throughout this period of almost 40 years, more than 500,000 engines were produced. The factory continues to make engine parts for other makes such as Fiat and Scania.

=== Caterpillar ===
From the early 1970s onwards, Perkins was a major supplier to Caterpillar Inc., who were a major customer of Perkins's smaller and mid-sized engines; Caterpillar was a major producer of large diesel engines for stationary and mobile applications. In 1998 Caterpillar Inc bought Perkins from LucasVarity for US$1.325 billion, creating what they claimed was the world's largest diesel engine manufacturer. Perkins now had manufacturing facilities in the United Kingdom, United States, Brazil, China, India, and a joint venture with Ishikawajima-Shibaura-Machinery company in Japan.

On 1 June 2018, Steve Ferguson became President of Perkins Engines, replacing Ramin Younessi, after having worked as the general manager of Caterpillar's Advanced Component Manufacturing Department and overseeing operations at 15 global facilities. Ferguson is a vice-president of Caterpillar.

=== Discontinued products ===
Various Perkins diesel engines have been made for industrial, agricultural, construction, material handling, marine and power generation markets, and Perkins gas-based engines (natural gas, landfill gas, digester gas, bio gas and mine gas) are used for continuous power generation.

Perkins' 4.99 1.6 litre (99 cubic inch) and the P4C engine [192 cubic inch], producing 45 or 60 hp (45 kW), were popular in Europe and Israel for taxis and commercially driven cars during the 1950s and early 1960s; many cars, including American imports, were retrofitted with these engines for taxi use, with kits made by Hunter NV of Belgium. Perkins engines were also used as standard factory equipment in Jeeps and Dodge trucks in the United States in the 1960s. They also continued to be popular in European trucks from their original customer, Commer and other companies.

The Perkins 6.354 medium duty engine was designed to be compact enough to replace petrol/gasoline V8 engines in trucks, despite its in-line six-cylinder design. Producing 112 horsepower (84 kW) in early years (later rising to 120-hp), it had a small jackshaft driven by the timing gears for the auxiliary drive, with the oil pump driven by a quill shaft so it could run auxiliary equipment at engine speed with simple couplings.

Until the 2010s, Perkins manufactured engines for JCB, but since then JCB manufactures their own engines.

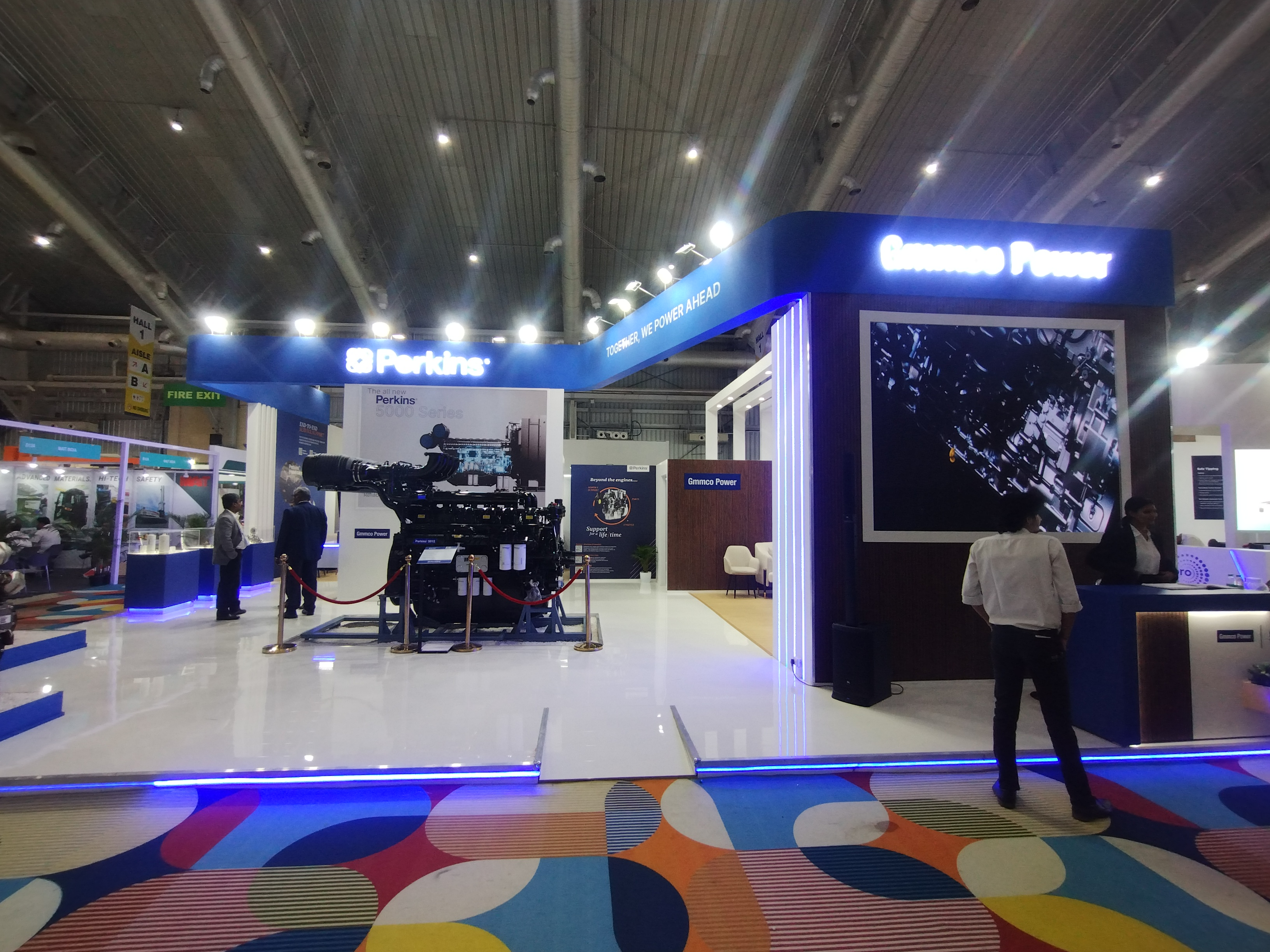
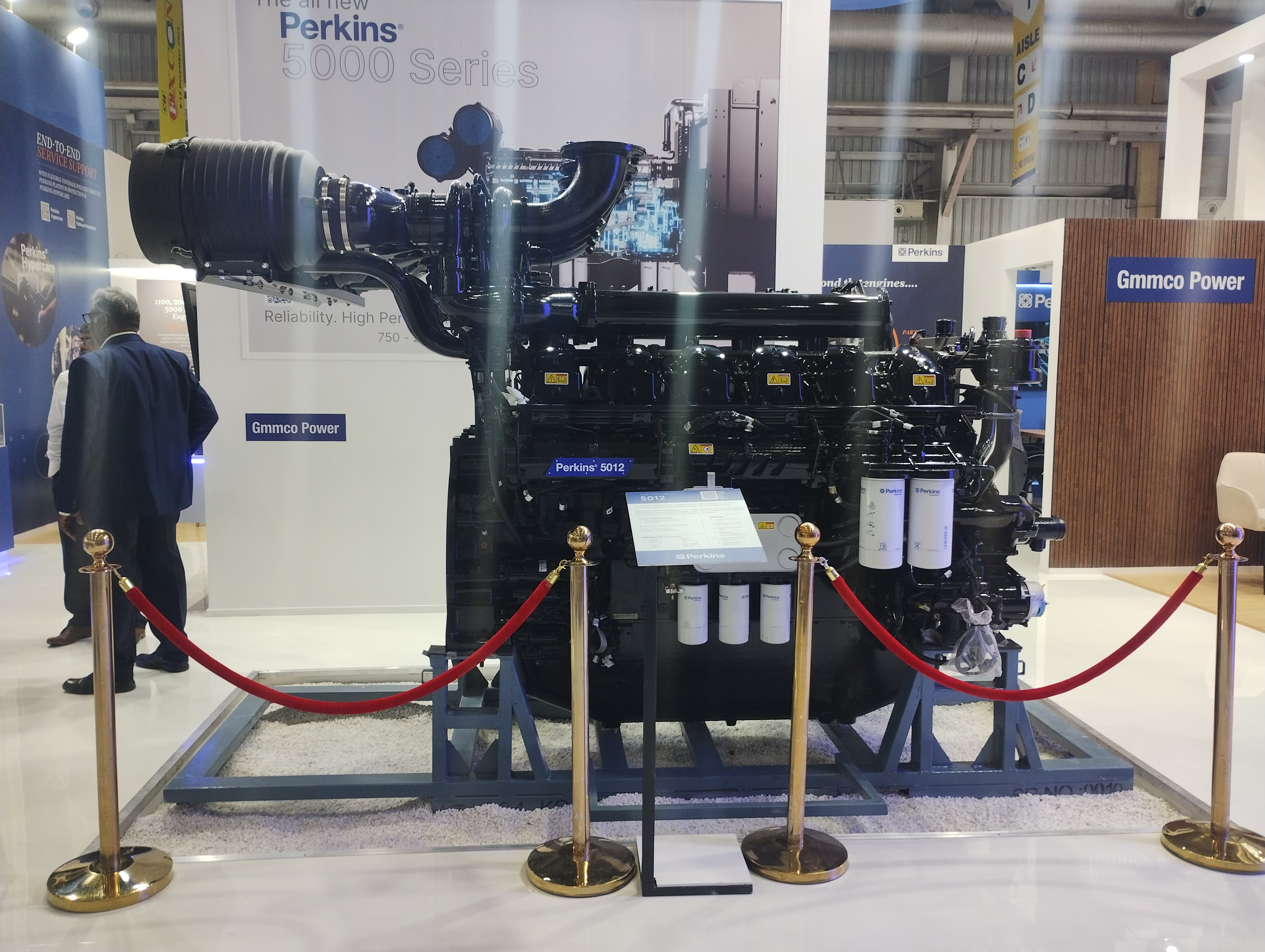
Perkins Engines (left), Perkins 5012 (12 cylinder powerhouse) industrial diesel engine (right), at EXCON 2025, BIEC

== Current users ==
Perkins engines are installed in tractors, generators, industrial tools, and other machinery. Their biggest customer is their parent company, Caterpillar, particularly for excavators and diesel generators. Perkins Marine also produces small engines for marine propulsion.

== See also ==
- List of Perkins engines
