= Charles Chapman (engineer) =

British mechanical engineer (1897–1979)

Charles Wallace Chapman (4 August 1897 – December 1979) was a British mechanical engineer, who designed the first diesel engine suitable for an automobile, the high speed diesel engine (compression ignition engine).

== Early life ==
He was born in Lancaster, Lancashire. He grew up at 'Ivy House' in Lancaster, the son of James Chapman. His parents moved to Dovercourt in Essex in 1925.

He attended Lancaster Royal Grammar School. He served in the First World War as a lieutenant in the RNVR. He later gained a master's degree in engineering from the University of Liverpool in July 1924.

== Career ==
=== Petters ===
In the 1920s he worked as personal assistant to Sir Ernest Petter, who owned Petters Ltd (Ipswich). At this company he worked with Frank Perkins.

=== Perkins Engines ===
On 7 June 1932 he jointly founded Perkins Engines in Peterborough (then in Northamptonshire) with Frank Perkins, who he first met in 1929. Perkins Engines was created to build high speed diesel engines. Francis Arthur Perkins was the businessman, and Charles Chapman provided technical skill.

When inventing his first engine, the difficulty was the ignition. This was overcome with a pintaux-type fuel injector, similar to a pintle injector. The pintaux injector has an additional hole in the side of the injector to introduce air. It first ran on 3 December 1932. He was the technical director of Perkins Engines. This first engine, in April 2009, won a IMechE Engineering Heritage Awards.

During the Second World War, he designed the Perkins S6 marine diesel engine, which powered the Royal Navy's air-sea rescue craft. He also designed the T1 engine for boats, which was not made. He resigned from Perkins in November 1942. Frank Perkins died in 1967.

In 1950s, his company was 'Compression Ignition Ltd', which made couplings, with a site at 104 The Green, in Twickenham, later known as Twiflex Couplings Ltd, which later made disc brakes and clutches, later a division of GKN in the 1980s. At one point Twiflex employed 900 people, but closed in the late 1980s.

=== Second World War ===
During the Second World War he carried out work for the Air Ministry.

== Publications ==
- 'Modern High Speed Oil Engines', a standard textbook, in three volumes
- The Directors Dinner, a novel featuring Sir Ernest Stark of Stark Engineering Ltd, published by Ward, Lock & Co., on 23 April 1964
- The Boardroom Battle, a novel, published by Ward Lock, on 26 October 1965

== Personal life ==
He married Eleanor on 28 July 1925 at St Mary's Roman Catholic Church in Lancashire, the daughter of John James McKeown OBE, who was awarded the OBE in the 1918 New Year Honours, a manager at Vickers Ltd; Mr McKeown was born in 1872 in Gateshead and attended St Cuthbert's RC Grammar School, and retired aged 64 in July 1936.

In the early 1930s he lived in Strood in Kent. From the 1940s he lived at 'The Stables' and 'Briar Cottage' on Church Road at Burstow in south-east Surrey, opposite the church. He had a son and daughter. He held events for the Burstow and Smallfield Conservative Association, being the local chairman, as well as for the local WI. The local Conservative MP was John Vaughan-Morgan, Baron Reigate. His wife was local Conservative chairman until December 1961.

He died at 'Chapel Plat' in Hiham Green, near Winchelsea in East Sussex, aged 82 in 1979. His wife Eleanor died on 27 September 1983 at Hiham Green.

== See also ==
- History of the diesel car
- List of diesel automobiles
