= Barford & Perkins =

Barford & Perkins Limited
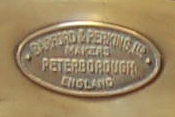

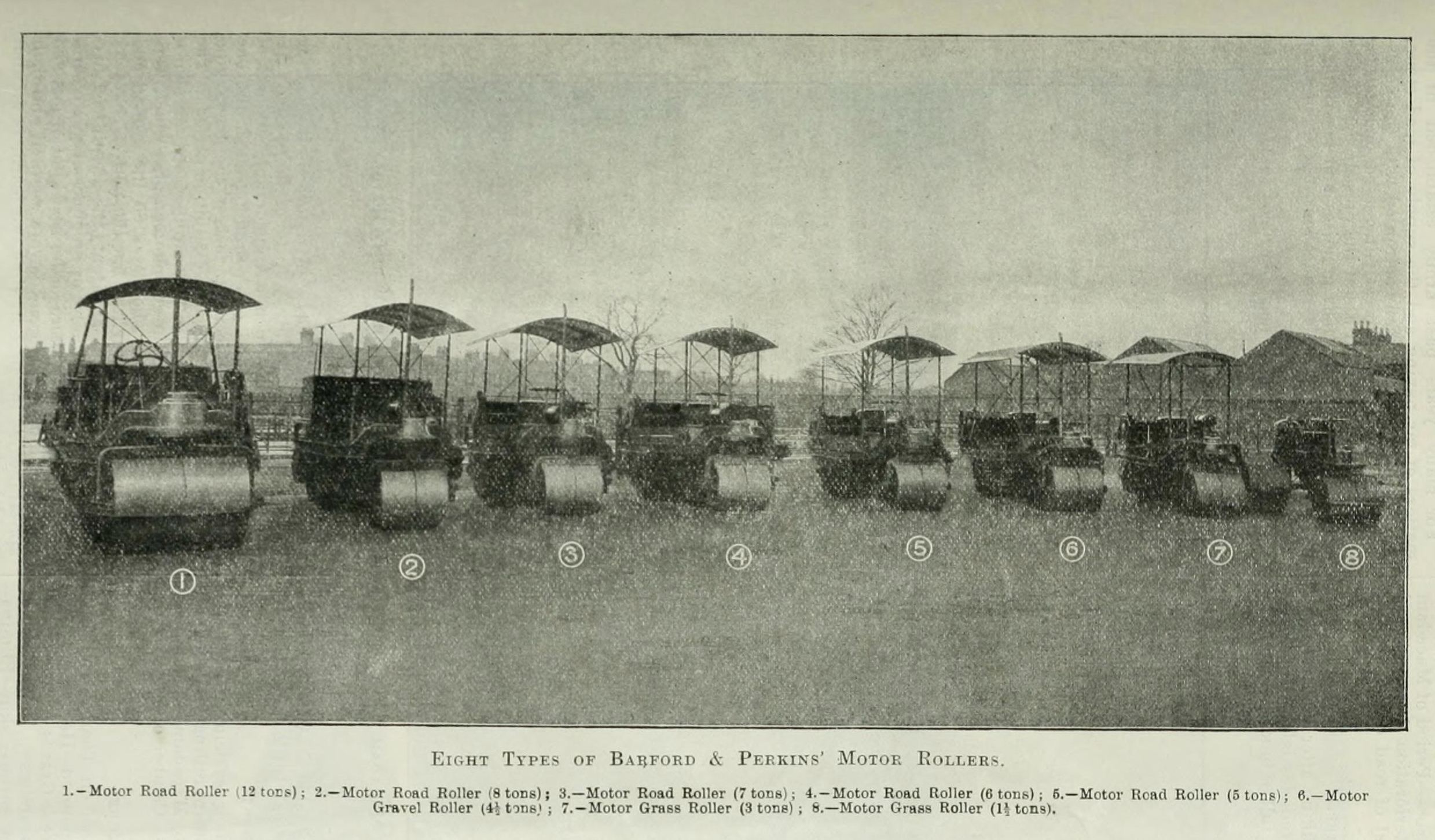
- Company type: Private
- Industry: Engineering
- Founded: 1840
- Defunct: 1934
- Successor: Aveling-Barford
- Headquarters: Peterborough, England
- Area served: International
- Products: Motor road rollers; Road-making machinery; Boilers; Dairy plant; Laundry machinery; Agricultural machinery
- Parent: Agricultural & General Engineers

Barford & Perkins were road roller and agricultural machinery manufacturers in Peterborough, England. The original business began in 1840. Their machinery was distributed internationally.

In 1920 it joined the engineering combine Agricultural & General Engineers (AGE) which failed in 1932. Barford & Perkins relocated from Peterborough at the end of the 1920s into part of the Aveling & Porter works in Rochester. Both companies made road rollers but the ranges were complementary, the Barford rollers were petrol-powered —the engines were made by Peter Brotherhood— and smaller than Aveling's steam-powered rollers.

At the instigation of chairman Edward Barford, Barford & Perkins's profitable business was bought from the AGE receiver along with Aveling & Porter with the support of Ruston & Hornsby, Ransomes, Sims & Jefferies and RA Lister & Company.

Barford & Perkins and Aveling & Porter were combined in 1933 and moved to Grantham in 1934 and Aveling & Porter was renamed Aveling-Barford that same year.

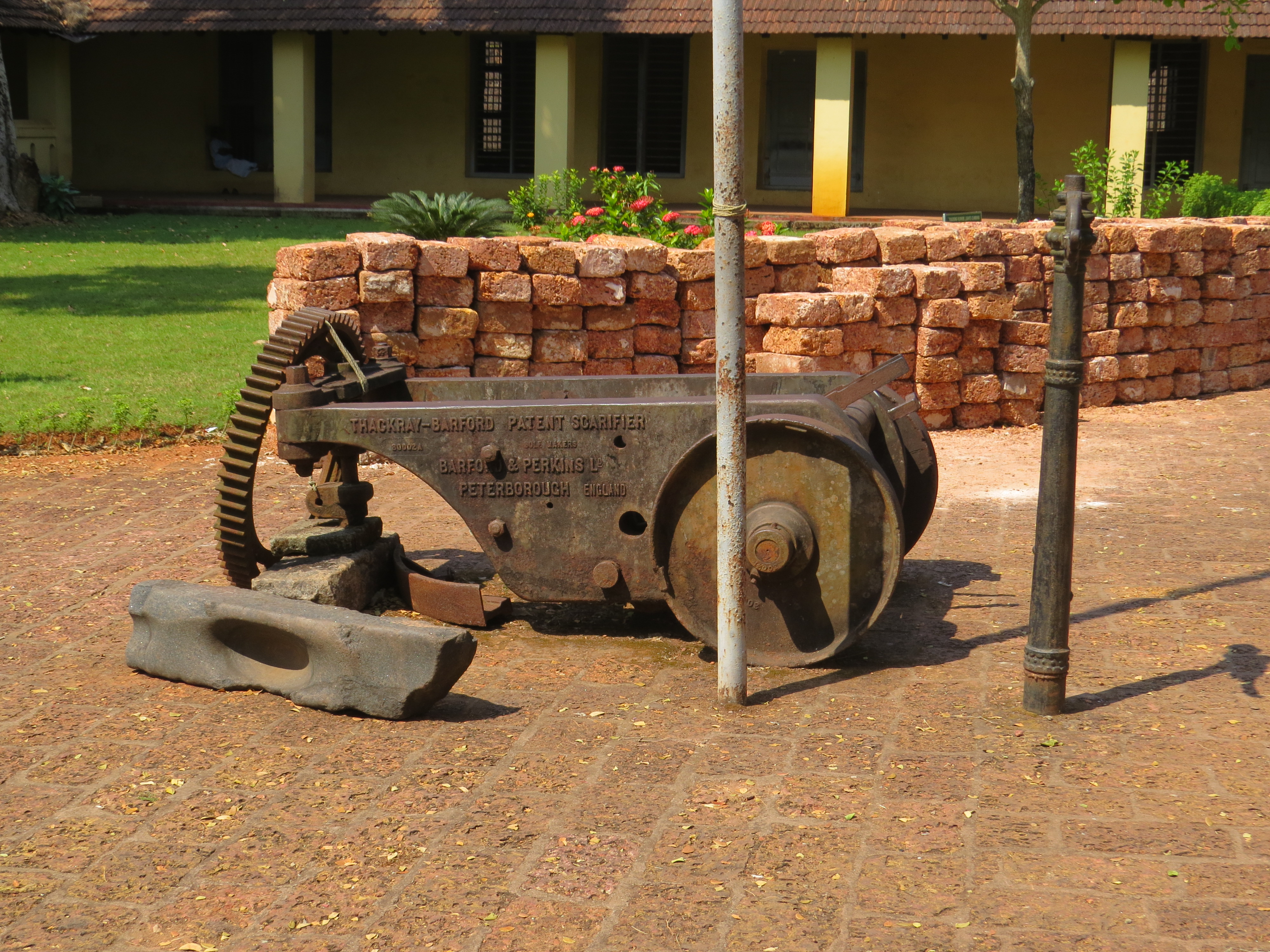
Surface scarifier, Kerala, India

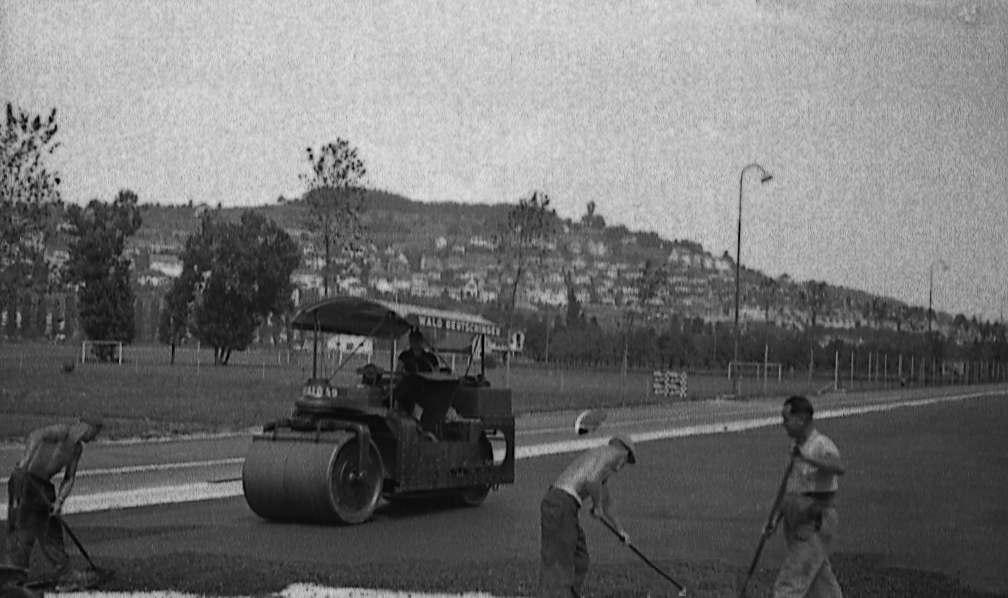
Roller in Zurich, Switzerland

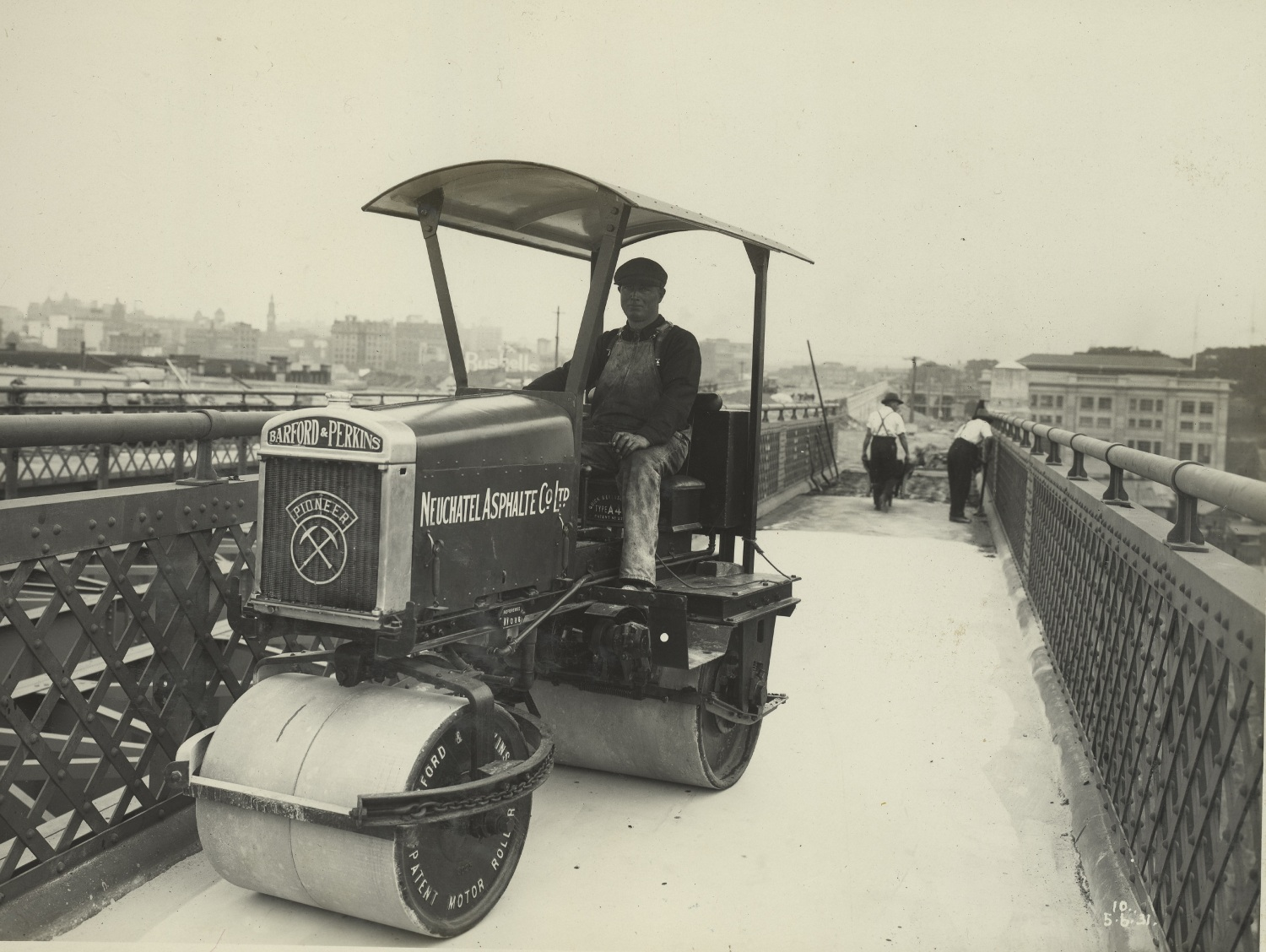
Road roller on Sydney Harbour Bridge, Australia
