= A421 road =

East-west road in southern England

Coordinates: 52.0099°N 0.7548°W

A421

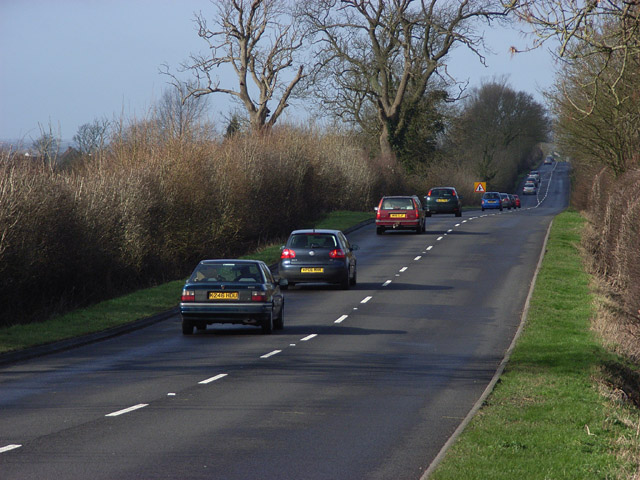
- The A421 looking towards Buckingham from Maywynn Farm.

Route information
- Length: 44.4 mi (71.5 km)

Major junctions
- East end: A1 Black Cat roundabout near St Neots
- A1 A6; M1 A4146; A5 A43
- West end: A43 near Brackley

Location
- Country: United Kingdom
- Primary destinations: Bedford; Milton Keynes

Road network
- Roads in the United Kingdom; Motorways; A and B road zones
← A420	→ A422

The A421 is an important road for east/west journeys across south central England. Together with the A428, the A43 and A34, it forms the route from Cambridge through Milton Keynes to Oxford. The section between the A1 (near St Neots) and the A5 (in Milton Keynes) is a national primary route.

== Route ==
As of 2025, the road begins as a grade-separated dual carriageway at the A1, just south of St Neots (and the junction with the A428 from Cambridge). The road bypasses both Great Barford and Bedford to the south to reach the M1 at junction 13. From there (rather than continue due west to the M40 south of Oxford as in the rejected Oxford Cambridge Expressway proposal) it swings north up through the southern part of Milton Keynes. Although it remains a dual carriageway, it encounters 16 roundabouts as it intersects the Milton Keynes grid road system (of which it is part). During this time it crosses the A5 (and connects to it via a short spur which is part of the V6 Grafton Street).

Continuing westwards now as a rural single carriageway, as the route approaches Buckingham it passes close by to the 14th century Thornborough Bridge, the only surviving mediaeval bridge in Buckinghamshire (bypassed by a new bridge in 1974). Close to here, it then forms the Buckingham by-pass, then a short section tof dual carriageway bypassing Tingewick, before joining the A43 (Northampton – M40 junction 10) near Brackley. (On crossing the A43, the route due westward becomes the B4031 through Croughton, Aynho and Deddington to join the A361 to Chipping Norton).

== Developments ==
=== M1 junction 13 to Milton Keynes ===
In 2010, in conjunction with the M1 widening schemes and dualling of the A421 between M1 junction 13 and the A1 near St Neots, proposals were made to widen the A421 between the M1 junction 13 in Bedfordshire and the Kingston roundabout in Milton Keynes. The upgrade was completed in December 2020.

=== A1–M11/A14 link ===
In the "Road investment strategy" announced to Parliament by the Department for Transport and Secretary of State for Transport on 1 December 2014, planning would begin to dual the section between the A1 and the A1198 at Caxton Gibbet. The link is to provide an uninterrupted dual carriageway route between the M1 (at junction 13) and the M11/A14 (at junction 14 and 31) near Cambridge. In September 2021, National Highways announced that this new section of dual carriageway will be designated A421.

In December 2023, work began on the new alignment that replaces the A1/A421 junction (the "Black Cat roundabout") with a three-level grade-separated junction, and that (further) bypasses St Neots. It also provides a route to the planned new town around Tempsford. As of August 2025, the new road was anticipated to be ready for traffic in "spring 2027".

=== Oxford–Cambridge Expressway ===
The Oxford to Cambridge Expressway was a proposed grade-separated dual carriageway between the A34 near Oxford and the A14 near Cambridge, via (or near) Milton Keynes. The proposal aimed to establish this route by linking existing roads and building new ones. The case for its creation was examined in a Strategic Study for the Cambridge – Milton Keynes – Oxford corridor, published by National Infrastructure Commission in November 2016. The NIC saw the road as being of national strategic importance by providing an outer orbital route around London, linking Southampton, the M3, M4, M40, M1, A1, A14/M11 and Felixstowe. Had this plan been realised, it would have replaced the congested (mostly) single carriageway road between Milton Keynes and the A43.

In March 2021, Transport Secretary Grant Shapps cancelled the plan, citing analysis that showed that its costs would exceed its benefits.

== Notable events ==
=== Speeding ===
The A421 Tingewick bypass has a minor claim to fame as the location of the then fastest speeding incident ever recorded by British police, in March 2003. Andrew Osborne of Leamington Spa was filmed by a mobile speed camera while travelling at 157 mph (253 km/h) on a motorcycle. His friend Neil Bolger of Gaydon was clocked at 148 mph (238 km/h). Both were convicted of dangerous driving, imprisoned for 28 days and banned from driving for two years (with a compulsory re-test).

=== Blind driver ===
Blind Martine Brooks drove along the newly constructed A421 Great Barford Bypass (From the A1 Black Cat roundabout to Bedford) and back to raise money for charity. The drive took place two days before the official road opening, and she was accompanied by Frank Branston (mayor of Bedford), Steve Clarke (teacher and navigator), and Denise Hubbard (driving instructor and car owner). She reached a speed of 65 mph (105 km/h) before doing a flawless three point turn, and returning to the A1.

=== Flooding ===
On 22 September 2024, the section of the A421 near Marston Moreteyne (between the A6 and the M1) was heavily flooded after a months worth of rain fell in under 48 hours. The road was closed in both directions for more than two weeks until more than 70 million litres (15 million imperial gallons) of water had been pumped away and the badly damaged road resurfaced. The underpass has a permanent pump at Lower Shelton but it was inadequate to deal with so much water in such a short time and failed after being submerged in the flood.
