= Caxton =

Caxton may refer to:

== Places ==
- Caxton Street, Brisbane, Australia
- Caxton, Cambridgeshire, a village in Cambridgeshire, UK
  - Caxton Gibbet, a knoll near the village
- Caxton Hall, a historic building in London, UK
- Caxton Building, a historic building in Cleveland, Ohio, US
- Saint-Élie-de-Caxton, Quebec, Canada

== Publishers ==
- Caxton Press (New Zealand)
- Caxton and CTP Publishers and Printers, a publisher in South Africa
- Caxton Press (United Kingdom)
- Caxton Press (United States)

== Other uses ==
- Caxton Associates, an American investment firm
- Caxton Club, an American social club in Chicago, Illinois, US
- Caxton College, a private school in Valencia, Spain
- The Caxtons, a novel by Edward Bulwer-Lytton
- William Henry Rhodes or Caxton, American attorney
- William Caxton, an English printer, credited as being the first person to introduce the printing press to England in the 1470s
