= Caxton, Cambridgeshire =

Village and civil parish in England

Coordinates: 52.20843°N 0.09450°W

Caxton
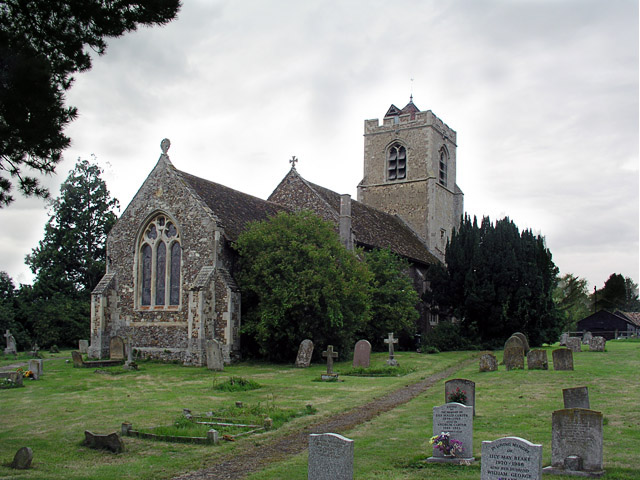
- St Andrew's Church

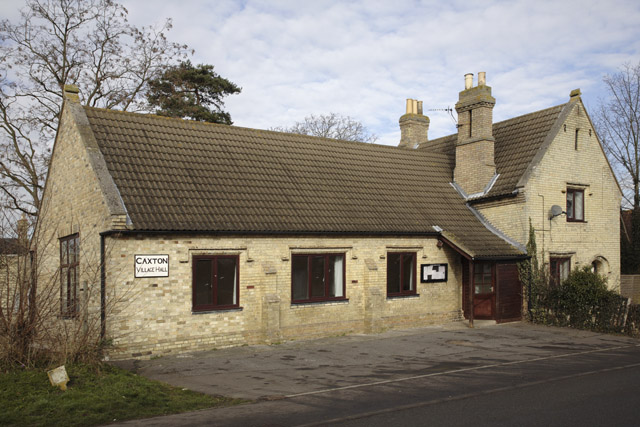
- Village Hall

- Location within Cambridgeshire
- Population: 572 (2011)
- OS grid reference: TL303584
- District: South Cambridgeshire
- Shire county: Cambridgeshire
- Region: East
- Country: England
- Sovereign state: United Kingdom
- Post town: CAMBRIDGE
- Postcode district: CB23
- Dialling code: 01954
- Police: Cambridgeshire
- Fire: Cambridgeshire
- Ambulance: East of England
- UK Parliament: South Cambridgeshire

Caxton is a small rural village and civil parish in the South Cambridgeshire district of Cambridgeshire, England. It is 9 miles west of the county town of Cambridge. In 2001, the population of Caxton parish was 480 people, increasing to 572 at the 2011 Census. Caxton is most famous for the Caxton Gibbet.

== History ==
The name Caxton is probably derived from 'farmstead of a man called Kakkr'. It was spelled Caustone in the 1086 Domesday Book when 35 peasants lived there. It is probable that the village came into existence as a late Scandinavian settlement in an area of woodland. The use of the names 'weald' and 'wald' in the 12th century indicate the influence of woods.

What was the Roman Ermine Street, now the A1198 road, bisects Caxton parish. The modern village has grown up around the road, although the church is a short distance south-west, along Gransden Road. There are also three medieval moated sites further from the road: Caxton Moats, which has signs of Anglo-Saxon or Norman occupation; Caxton Pastures, south-west of Caxton Gibbet, which may have belonged to John of Caxton, a 13th-century landowner; and Swansley, south-east of the gibbet. St Peter's Street (or, Lane), north and east of the church, may have been the centre of the original village.

The road provided passing trade; the market was held next to it and the Crown and George inns were built there. Parts of the Crown inn date from the 15th century and it was known by that name by 1545. Caxton benefitted from travellers passing through but highway robbers could also be a problem. The road became busier after the 16th century and a post office was opened at the Crown inn 'many years' before 1660. By the mid-18th century, Caxton post office was one of only two in the whole county.

After the end of the coaching era, Caxton declined. In 1863, a traveller described the village as "a small, rambling village, which looked as if it had not shaved and washed its face, and put on a clean shirt for a shocking length of time". Fires in 1896 and 1897 destroyed more than a dozen houses and, although the arrival of the motor car brought traffic back through the village, its former prosperity did not return. In 2004 a bypass was completed around Caxton to accommodate traffic for the newly built Cambourne to the north.

== Governance ==
Caxton is represented on South Cambridgeshire District Council by two councillors for the Caxton and Papworth electoral ward and on Cambridgeshire County Council by one councillor for the Papworth and Swavesey electoral division. It is represented at the House of Commons as part of the St Neots and Mid Cambridgeshire constituency.

== Geography ==
Caxton parish is 9 miles (14 km) west of Cambridge, 7 miles (11 km) east of the town of St Neots and 48 miles (77 km) north of London. It stands on the A1198 (Ermine Street, the Old North Road) between the villages of Papworth Everard, to the north, and Longstowe, to the south. Roads run from Caxton to the villages of Bourn and Great Gransden. It ranges from 44 to 68 m (144 to 223 ft) above sea level and the soil is clay with a blue gault subsoil. Bourn Brook runs through Caxton, eventually joining the River Cam.

== Sport ==
Speedway racing was staged at Caxton. The venue was described as being on the main Cambridge to St Neots road near Caxton Gibbet. The first meeting was staged on 6 April 1931 and a number of Sunday afternoon events were staged that year and again in 1932. Fewer meetings appear to have been staged 1933 and further research is needed to ascertain other activity. A greyhound racing track was opened adjacent to the speedway track on 11 September 1932. The racing was independent (not affiliated to the sports governing body the National Greyhound Racing Club) and was known as a flapping track, which was the nickname given to independent tracks. Totalisator and refreshment facilities were available in addition to a free car park.

== Demography ==
At the time of the 2001 census, the population of Caxton parish was 480 people. All residents were white and 72% described themselves as Christian, with 27.8% either having no religion or stating none. In 1881 the population was 129, and in 1921 the population had grown to 398.

== Landmarks ==
Caxton Gibbet stands by the side of the A428 road, north of Caxton village. The roundabout at the junction of the A428 and A1198 is also known as Caxton Gibbet.

A war memorial, commemorating Caxton men who died in the First and Second World Wars, stands at the junction of Ermine Street, Bourn Road and Gransden Road.

== Noted people ==
- Peter King (British Army officer)

== Religious sites ==
Caxton has two churches. The Church of St Andrew was built of stone and flint mainly in the Early English style. It has a low tower with six bells. There are some pictures and a description of the church at the Cambridgeshire Churches website. A Baptist church was built in 1842.

== See also ==
- List of places in Cambridgeshire
