= Black Cat roundabout =

A1/A421 junction in Bedfordshire, England

- Black Cat junction
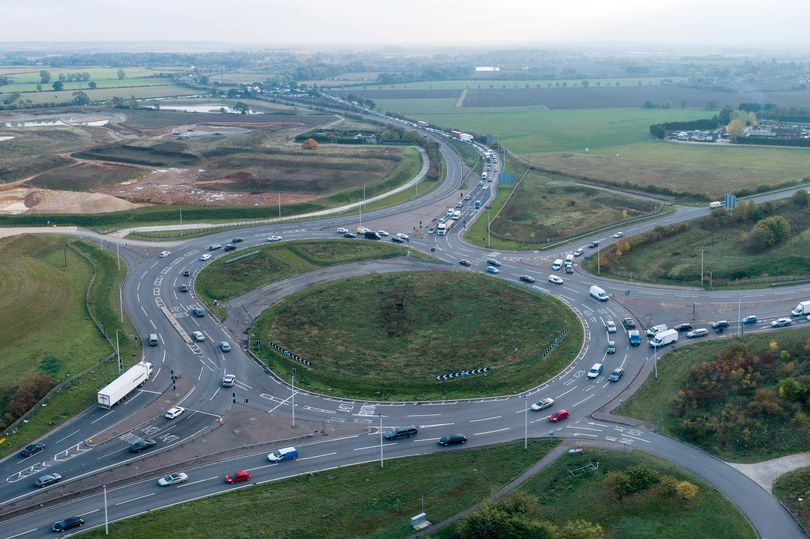
- The roundabout in 2019 looking south
- Interactive map of Black Cat roundabout

Location
- Roxton, Bedfordshire
- Coordinates: 52°11′05″N 0°18′19″W
- Roads at junction: A1 A421

Construction
- Type: Roundabout
- Maintained by: National Highways

Location in Bedfordshire

Black Cat roundabout (also Black Cat junction) forms the junction between the A1 and A421 (formerly A428) in Bedfordshire, England, just south of St Neots. It has been reconstructed twice since 2000 and, as of 2024, a third reconstruction is underway to completely replace it with a free-flowing junction, and becoming the Black Cat junction.

It takes its name from the garage and car repair workshop which opened in the 1920s at the junction called the Black Cat Garage. The garage was later converted to a nightclub and then a restaurant, before becoming derelict for many years. In the 1980s a covered petrol station and hotel was opened on the site. All the buildings in this northwest quadrant of the junction were demolished during the 2024 upgrade.

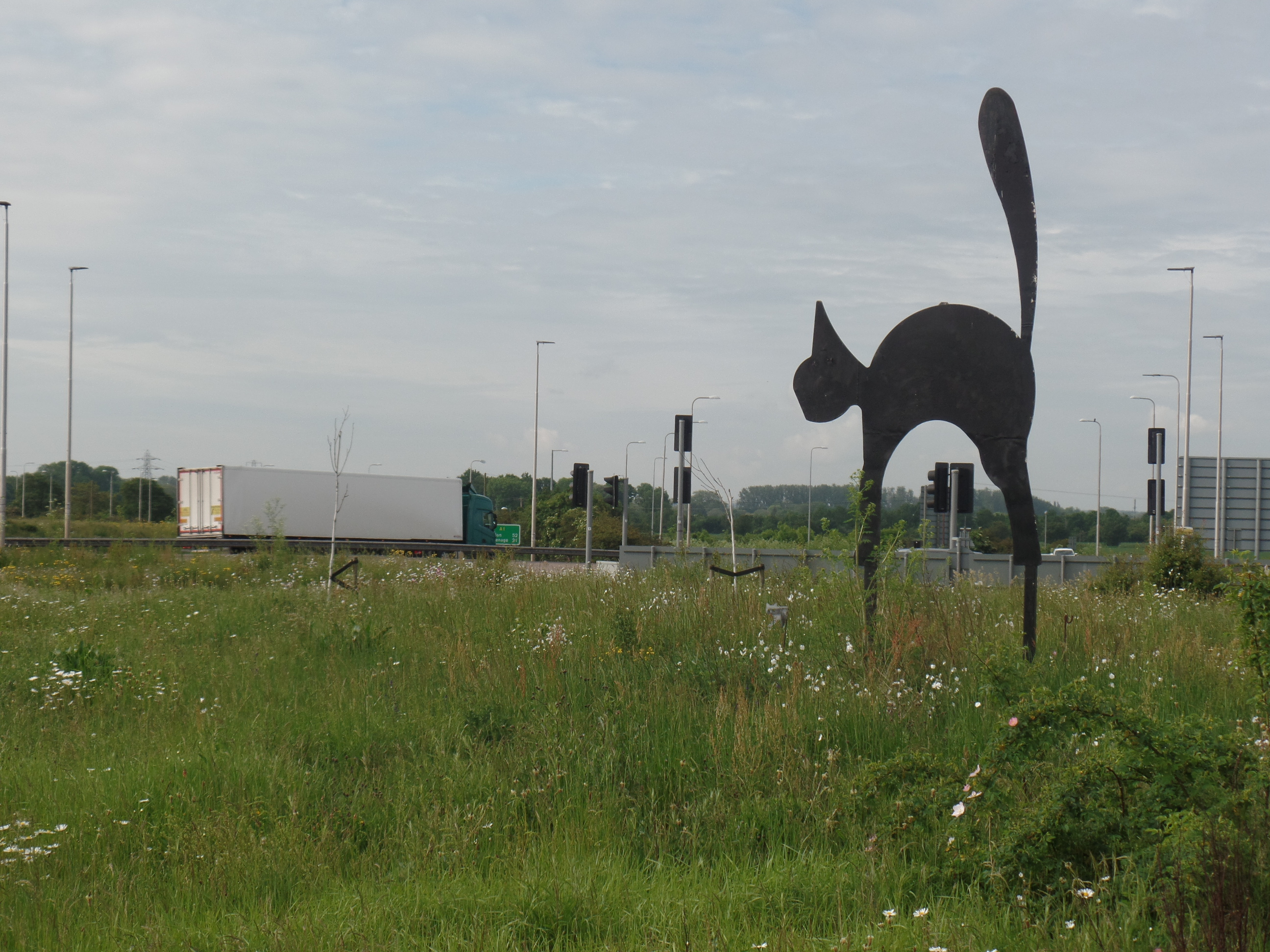
The black cat roundabout on the A1

The roundabout can regularly be heard being referred to on traffic reports because of the major traffic jams that it causes on the A1.

== History of the Black Cat sculpture ==
In January 2004, a (two-dimensional) metal sculpture of a black cat was installed on the roundabout, based on the original Black Cat Garage emblem and produced by local fabricators including Watson & Brookman. The installation is widely described as a locally driven initiative rather than a formal highways project.

During reconstruction works associated with the Great Barford bypass between 2005 and 2006, the original sculpture was removed and relocated. A larger replacement sculpture was installed following the completion of the works in 2006. This version was stolen in June 2007.

A further replacement sculpture was installed in August 2008. In April 2009, the previously stolen sculpture was rediscovered following a note indicating its location, being placed in a ditch near a roundabout in Upper Caldecote.

The sculpture has been subject to repeated vandalism and damage. In the early 2010s it was reported to have been bent and structurally damaged, requiring repair before being reinstated in January 2015 during further road works.

In May 2019, the sculpture was vandalised with white paint, altering its appearance and creating what was described as a "grimacing face". Following, the clean-up of this incident, two smaller kitten figures were added to the base of the main statue.

As part of the Black Cat to Caxton Gibbet improvement scheme led by National Highways, the sculpture was removed in early 2024 and placed into storage for safekeeping during construction. Plans indicate that the sculpture is intended to be reinstated at the upgraded junction upon completion of the works, although it is currently unclear whether the two smaller kitten figures will also be returned alongside the main statue.

== 2005–2006 reconstruction ==
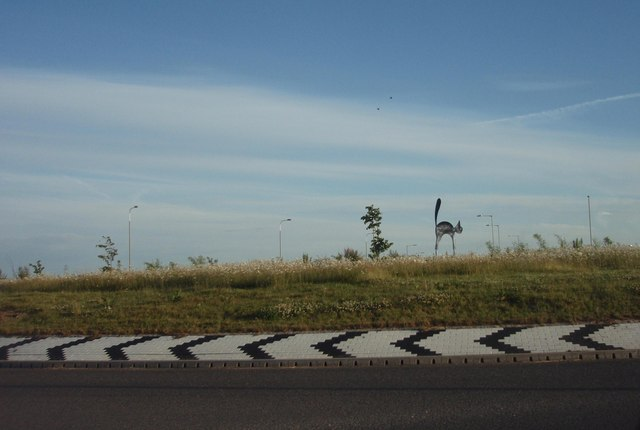
The Black Cat roundabout with black metal cat.

From 2005 to 2006, the roundabout was reconstructed as part of the A421 Great Barford Bypass works, to provide access to the new route. The roundabout was made much larger to incorporate a fifth exit connecting the bypass.

Despite the increased size and improved connectivity between the A421 and the A1, the junction remained an at-grade roundabout. No major measures were introduced to improve overall traffic flow, and the junction continued to experience congestion, particularly during peak periods.

== 2014–2015 reconstruction ==
In June 2014, Highways Agency began work to reconstruct the roundabout and its approaches.

The £5.6 million project, delivered as part of the government's 'pinch point' programme, involved further enlargement of the roundabout and the introduction of traffic signals to better manage vehicle movements and improve safety.

The works were completed in 2015. While they improved traffic control, the junction continued to be regarded as a significant congestion point on the strategic road network.

== 2023–2027 reconstruction ==
In February 2019, Highways England announced final route selection to replace the single-carriageway section of the A428 from Caxton Gibbet to the A1, with construction to begin in 2022.

In March 2021, Highways England signed a contract with Skanska to construct the new road, which it then expected to open to traffic in 2025–2026.

In December 2023, work began on the new alignment, which replaces the roundabout with a three-level grade-separated junction.

The scheme forms part of a wider upgrade programme for the east-west route between Cambridge and Milton Keynes, aimed at improving capacity, reducing congestions, and enhancing journey reliability.

As of August 2025, the existing roundabout remains in operation while construction of the new junction continues, with temporary traffic management measures and diversions in place. The scheme is expected to be completed and open to traffic in spring 2027.

The upgraded junction is commonly referred to in construction updates and marketing materials by National Highways as the Black Cat junction, reflecting the redevelopment from a traditional roundabout into a grade-separated interchange.

=== Road numbering ===
In September 2021, National Highways announced that this new section of dual carriageway will be designated A421, with the bypassed sections renumbered as A1428 and B1428.

== See also ==
- Oxford to Cambridge Expressway (M11/A14 to M40), which would have incorporated the routes currently designated A421 and A428, together with a new section between the M1 and M40. The latter was cancelled in 2021 and consequently the route terminates at the M1.
