= Rosanna Lavelle =

British actress

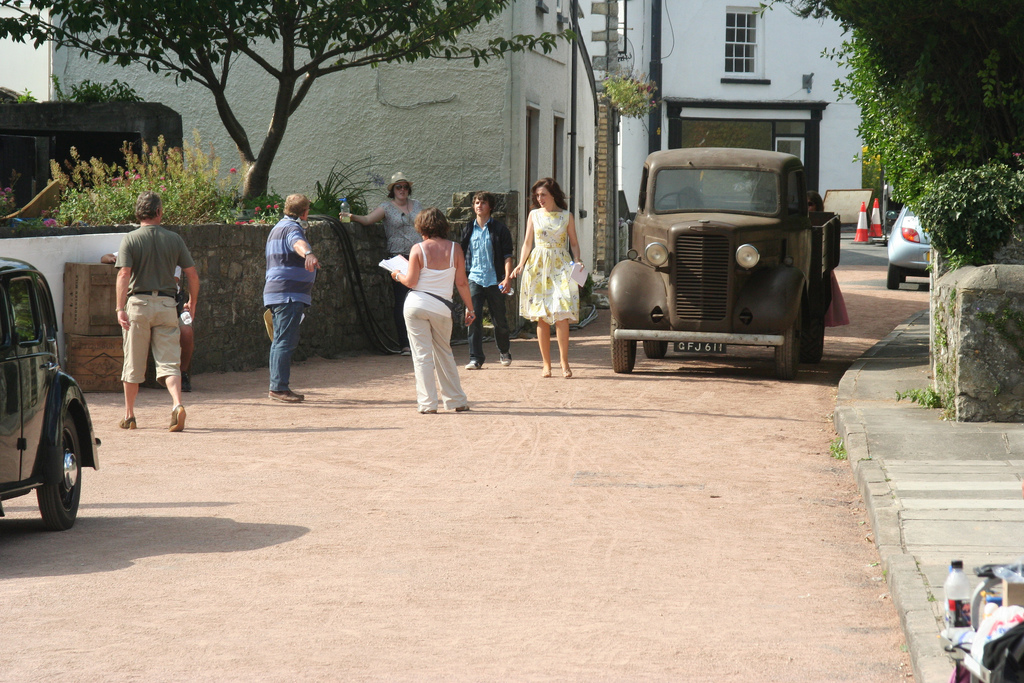
- Rosanna Lavelle (right) during the filming of The Sarah Jane Adventures
- Born: 8 August 1979 (age 46); Lancashire, England
- Years active: 2001- 2007

Sally Rosanna Lavelle (born 8 August 1979) better known simply as Rosanna Lavelle, is an English actress. She attended the National Student Theatre in 1997 and then studied at Cambridge University.

Lavelle has won critical praise for her stage roles. She was called the "emotional core" of the 2006 revival of An Inspector Calls. Lavelle's performance as Beatrice in A View from the Bridge with the National Student Drama Festival won a Sunday Times Outstanding Performance Award, Scarborough.

== Select Credits ==
Year	Format	Title	Role	Other notes
2001	Feature film	Charlotte Gray	Sophie the Telephonist	
2002	Feature film	Two Men Went to War	Emma Fraser	
2003	Feature film	Fix	Woman	
2004	TV series	Born and Bred	Pearl	Episode A Little Touch of Harry
2005	TV film	Casanova	Dresser	
2007	Feature film	Angel	Lady Irania	Also known as The Real Life of Angel Deverell
2008	TV serial	Sense and Sensibility	Lady Middleton	
2008	TV series	The Sarah Jane Adventures	Barbara Smith	serial The Temptation of Sarah Jane Smith
