= Two Men Went to War =

- Theatrical release poster
- Directed by: John Henderson
- Screenplay by: Richard Everett; Christopher Villiers
- Based on: Amateur Commandos by Raymond Foxall
- Produced by: Pat Harding; Ira Trattner
- Starring: Kenneth Cranham; Leo Bill
- Cinematography: John Ignatius
- Edited by: Kevin Finn; David Yardley
- Music by: Richard Harvey
- Production companies: Ira Trattner Productions; Little Wing Films
- Distributed by: Guerilla Films
- Release date: 1 November 2002
- Running time: 109 minutes
- Country: United Kingdom
- Language: English
- Box office: $218,378

Two Men Went to War is a 2002 British war comedy-drama film based on a true World War II story, from Raymond Foxall's book Amateur Commandos which describes the adventures of two army dental corps soldiers who sneak off on their own personal invasion of France. The film was directed by John Henderson with a screenplay by Richard Everett and Christopher Villiers.

== Plot ==
Sergeant Peter King and Private Leslie Cuthbertson of the Royal Army Dental Corps passionately desire to see active service, but are held back. Armed with two revolvers and a handful of grenades, they plan an unauthorised mission to occupied France. They write to the prime minister, Winston Churchill, explaining their intention to fight the Germans. After they finally succeed in getting to France, they stumble across a German radar station. They blow up what they take to be the main operations room, and then the entire compound unexpectedly erupts with gunfire and explosions. They narrowly evade the Germans and escape in a boat which is later blown up by a mine; the men are picked up by the British and interrogated as possible spies. Once their identities have been established, they are returned to barracks to be court-martialed as deserters.

An aide of Churchill had seen their letter, and knew of a commando raid on the radar facility which was facilitated by a diversion due to mysterious explosions in what they discover was actually the cookhouse. The aide intervenes in the court martial, establishes their presence at the enemy radar station and conveys an invitation to tea with the Prime Minister should they ever be in Whitehall. The court nevertheless demotes Sergeant King to the rank of corporal and remands Private Cuthbertson to military prison for 28 days, lenient sentences for desertion in wartime. A note on screen tells the viewer that the men never met again.

== Cast ==
- Kenneth Cranham as Sgt. Peter King
- Leo Bill as Pte. Leslie Cuthbertson
- Rosanna Lavelle as Emma Fraser
- Phyllida Law as Faith
- James Fleet as Maj. Bates
- Julian Glover as Col. Hatchard
- Anthony Valentine as SM Dudley
- David Ryall as Winston Churchill
- Derek Jacobi as Maj. Merton

== Facts on King and Cuthbertson from the closing screen notes ==
King went on to fight in Europe against the Nazis and was awarded the Military Cross for bravery. He also served in the Korean War in the 1950s and was awarded the Distinguished Service Order before moving to New Zealand where he died in a car crash in 1962.

After serving his sentence, Cuthbertson was posted to active duty in wartime Europe. In later life, he became Deputy Lord Mayor of the city of Newcastle upon Tyne. He died in 1995.
