= History of St Neots =

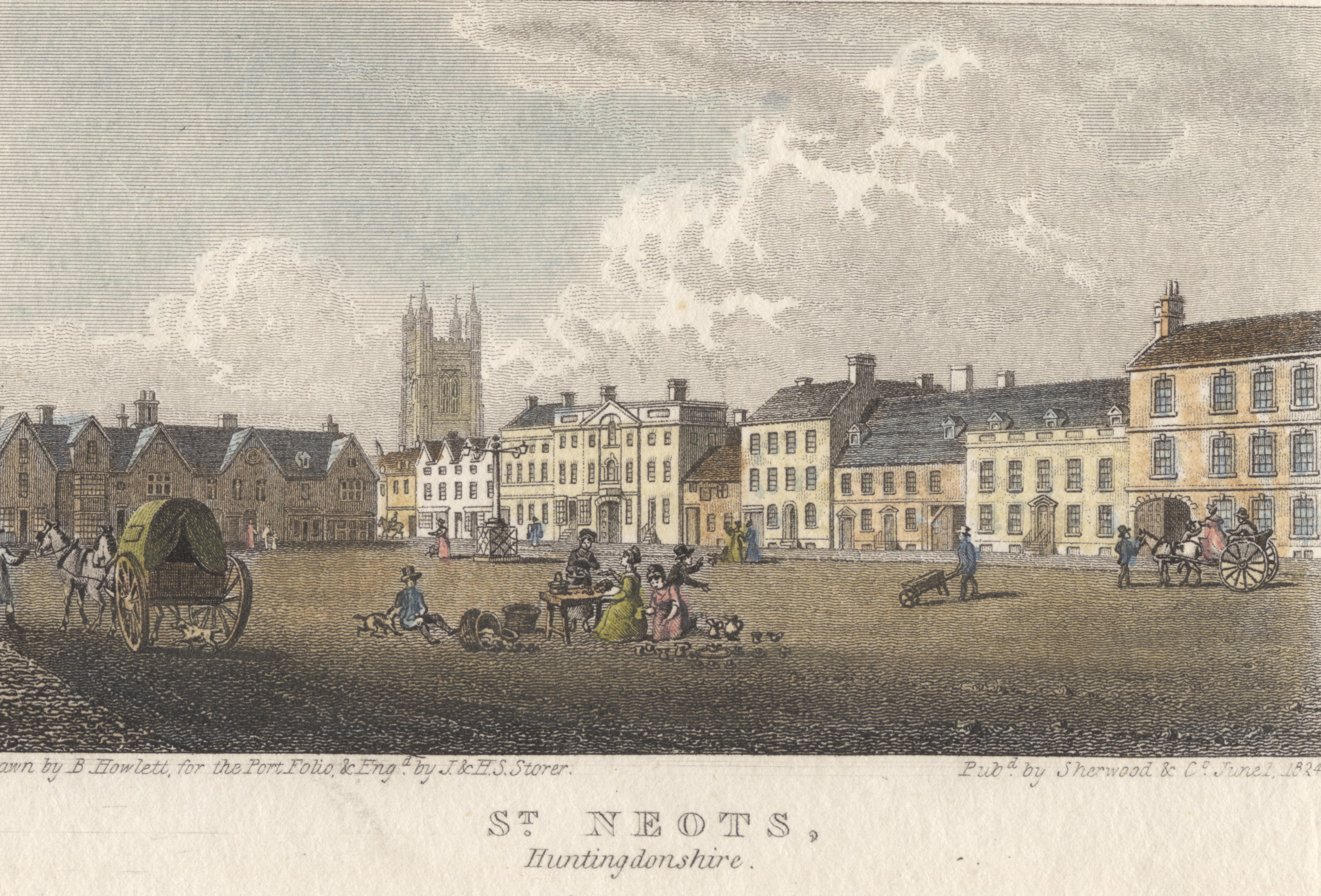
St Neots Market Square in 1824

St Neots, historically in Huntingdonshire, is one of the largest towns in Cambridgeshire, England, after the cities of Cambridge and Peterborough. There is evidence of very early occupation in the area. In Roman times a fortified settlement was established, and present-day Eynesbury in particular became important, in addition to scattered settlements west of the River Great Ouse. A holy man named Saint Neot had died about the year 877 AD and his relics were held for a century in a parish in Cornwall. About 974 AD a Priory was established in the northern part of Eynesburydowner took the relics of Saint Neot from the Cornish church and conveyed them to Eynesbury. This brought fame to the Eynesbury Priory, and gradually that part of the town became known as St Neots.

After the Norman Conquest the Priory was passed from the monastery at Ely to being a dependent branch of the Norman Abbey of Bec, and it grew in importance until the Dissolution of the Monasteries, when the Priory was destroyed and Neot's relics lost.

The importance of the town increased greatly in the early nineteenth century, when stage coach travel to the north of England became important. Eaton Socon was on the Great North Road and many coaches used inns there to change and stable horses, and to refresh passengers - four such coaching inns are still operating today as public houses. Some of the coaches travelled through St Neots as well, as did others on an east-to-west trajectory from Cambridge. The river too brought much trade to the towns. When the railway opened in 1850, St Neots had a wayside station, but the stage coach trade and the river traffic slumped, causing for a time a loss of prosperity in the area, though that was later regained.

After 1945 a considerable expansion of the housing stock took place as part of a national scheme named London overspill, designed to transfer London residents away from slum housing. The housebuilding programme continued sporadically under other names, and accelerated in the twenty-first century.

The county boundary between Huntingdonshire and Bedfordshire had been the River Great Ouse, but in 1965 the districts of Eaton Ford and Eaton Socon were brought into St Neots. Huntingdonshire was abolished (as a county-level unit - it continues to be a District Council) and replaced by Cambridgeshire in 1974.

This history article covers the modern urban area of St Neots, which includes Eaton Ford, Eaton Socon and Eynesbury.

== Before the Romans ==
There were probably small settlements in St Neots, Eynesbury and Eaton Socon in the Neolithic period, which lasted until about 1,700 BC. The Bronze Age followed, and more evidence of settlement has been found, including an axe head and evidence of a large building, possibly a temple, has been found in Eaton Ford near the Crosshall Road junction. Polished stone axes and beaker pottery of the early Bronze Age have been discovered in Eynesbury.

Archaeological excavations in the area now occupied by the Love's Farm houses, exposed the remains of a Bronze Age field system dating from around 1,500 BC. An agricultural community occupied the site for over 700 years from at least 200 BC to around the 5th or 6th centuries AD. From the Iron Age until the Romano-British period, and the Early Saxon period, successive generations lived on this land, improving drainage, growing new crops, managing livestock, and adding enclosures, buildings, roads and monuments.

There is also evidence for Iron Age settlement, and a pit containing pottery was found in the grounds of what is now Ernulf Academy. People of the later iron age made a settlement near Howitts Lane.

This pre-Roman activity altered the natural landscape quite markedly, mostly through the felling of timber to clear fields and construct buildings.

== The Roman period ==
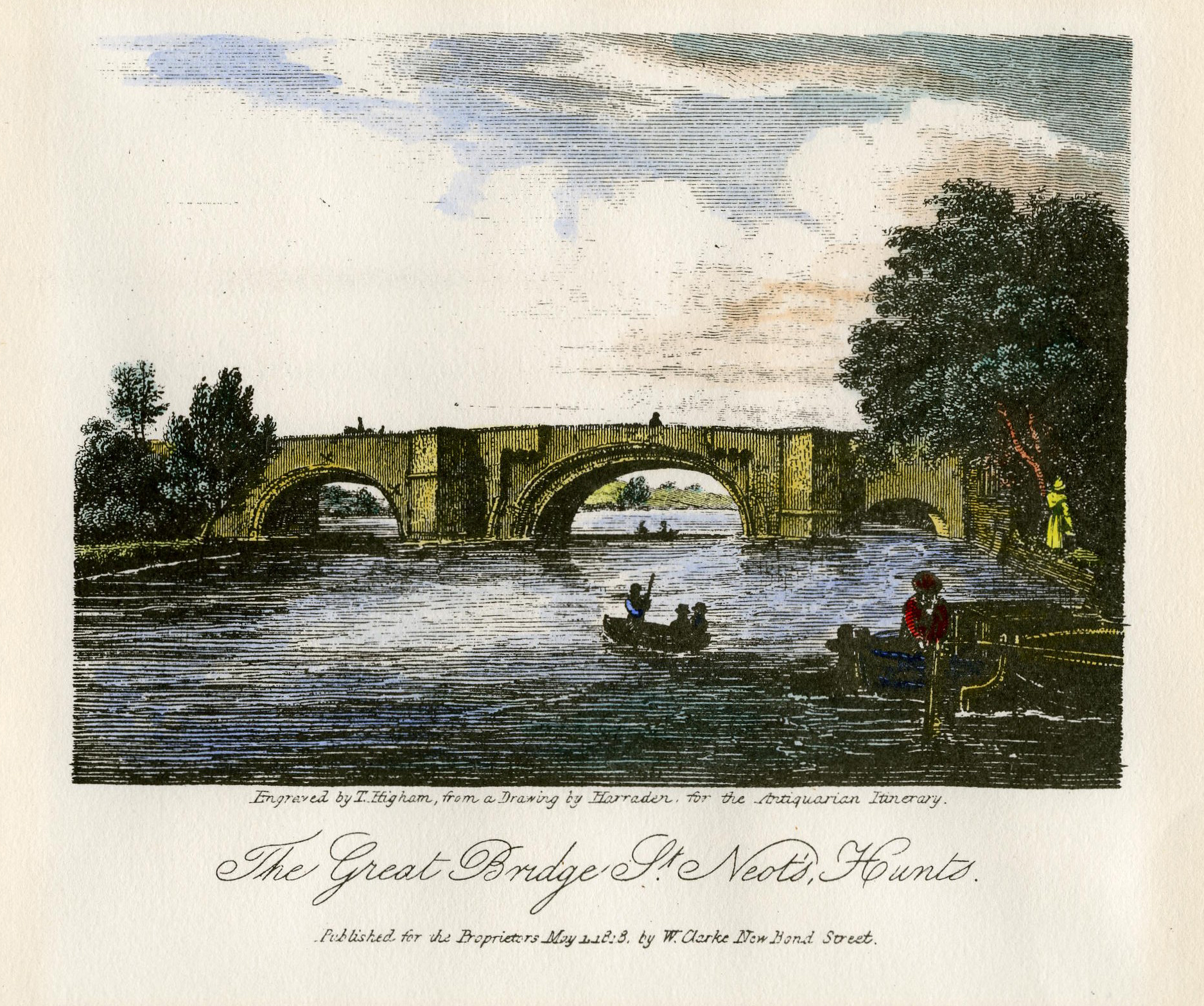
Hand-coloured engraving of St Neots Bridge, 1818

During the Roman period (43-410 AD) the Eynesbury settlement was extended towards the River Great Ouse, while staying above the level of the flood plain. A large Roman camp existed at the Conygeare area of Eynesbury.

Sites of at least two houses with hypocaust central heating have been located in this area. It is possible that agricultural produce was loaded here on to river transport for shipment down river, perhaps to supply food for the Roman army in the north by coastwise transport.

In addition Eynesbury had good road communications in Roman times. A road from Sandy to Godmanchester passed not far to the east, and there was a branch to Eynesbury. It is marked on present-day Ordnance Survey maps. A present-day footpath leading from Duck Lane towards Wintringham is on the line of a metalled Roman footpath, and pottery has been found near it.

== Anglo-Saxon and Viking period ==
The Romans left Britain between 446 AD and 454 AD, and new occupiers came in, chiefly the Angles and the Saxons. They subdued, or drove out, the indigenous population and established a system of local government in which the area was divided into hundreds, which may refer to an area containing one hundred families. The areas east of the River Great Ouse belonged to Toseland Hundred, and the western area to Barford Hundred.

A Saxon chieftain called Ernulf (or Eynulf, or Aynulf) took over the Roman encampment near the river crossing at Coneygeare and the area became known as Eanulfsbyrig, meaning Ernulf's fort. Later that became Einulfesberie, and then Eynesbury. St Neots did not exist as a separate place yet, and was simply part of Eynesbury.

To the west of the river, an Anglo-Saxon leader took control of a village near the water's edge, probably opposite the Coneygeare, and this was called Ea-tun, meaning waterside-village. Another settlement a little further north was called Forda, and later simply Ford. A further small settlement was on the hilltop near the Duloe windmill, and was then called Sudbury, meaning the southern fort.

Everyday objects have been found such as the clay weights used in weaving, broken pieces of pottery, a quern-stone, a plough share, and an iron axe. Burials from the period contained other objects such as a sword, spears, pagan brooches, and a knife.

Throughout this period the River Great Ouse was much wider and shallower than at present, with ill-defined banks. This made fording the river possible with care, and by choosing a dryer period to do so.

== Christianity ==
Although Christianity had been practised during the Roman period, the majority of the population were pagan. This was a situation disapproved of by the Pope, and in 597 AD he sent Augustine with some support, to re-convert the people. Augustine's work - alongside the mission from Iona via Lindisfarne - was successful and a hundred years later most of East Anglia was Christian.

A mother church was built in Eaton to serve as a focus for a large area on the west bank of the Great Ouse, while at Great Paxton on the east bank, another church served an area including the present-day St Neots and Eynesbury. Later in Saxon times Eynesbury built its own church.

== A priory and Saint Neot ==
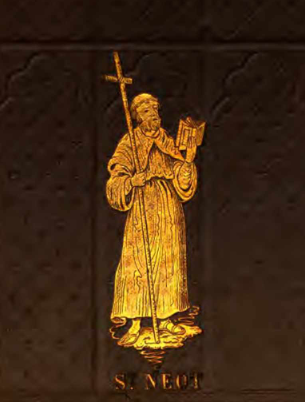
Saint Neot

About 972 AD an Anglo-Saxon landowner named Leofric (or Alric) and his wife Leoflaed founded a small monastery in Eynesbury (at that time known as Ernulph's Bury. The settlement was established at the junction of Huntingdon Street and Cambridge Street. However Leofric and Leoflaed built their priory near the river, adjacent to the present-day Priory Lane, St Neots.

The Priory had the potential to generate considerable income from the visits and donations of pilgrims, but to attract pilgrims they needed relics. Leofric decided to obtain the remains of Saint Neot, a much-revered Saxon monk who had spent much of his life in Cornwall. He had died in about 875 AD and been buried there. The present day village in Cornwall is known as St Neot. Leofric arranged to abstract Neot's bones, bringing them to his Priory. This had the desired effect and the Priory became a major centre of attention for pilgrims.

According to Gorham, the name of the locality near the Priory was changed to Neotsbury about 974 AD. (Note: Gorham adds, "Neotsbury, however, appears to have been rather the classical than the trivial name of this town; it was still, popularly, called Eynesbury".)

In 1765, a 12th century reliquary was discovered at Old Hall Place on Church Street. It is known as the Becket Casket and depicts the murder of the archbishop. While it is unknown how it came to be in the town, it is most likely linked to the town Priory. As an exemplary showcasing of the Limoges enamel technique, this reliquary is now located in the Victoria and Albert Museum in London.

== Viking incursion ==
In the late 10th and early 11th centuries, Viking raiders from Denmark started to occupy areas inland from their established coastal territories; they rowed longboats up the River Great Ouse, attacking religious houses to plunder their treasure; as pagans they held no qualms about the practice. It is likely that the Priory was destroyed by the Danes in about 1010 AD. As a precaution, St Neot's bones had been sent to Crowland Abbey in Lincolnshire for safe-keeping from the invaders. Neot's remains were brought back to the Priory in Eynesbury in 1020.

== Takeover by the Normans ==
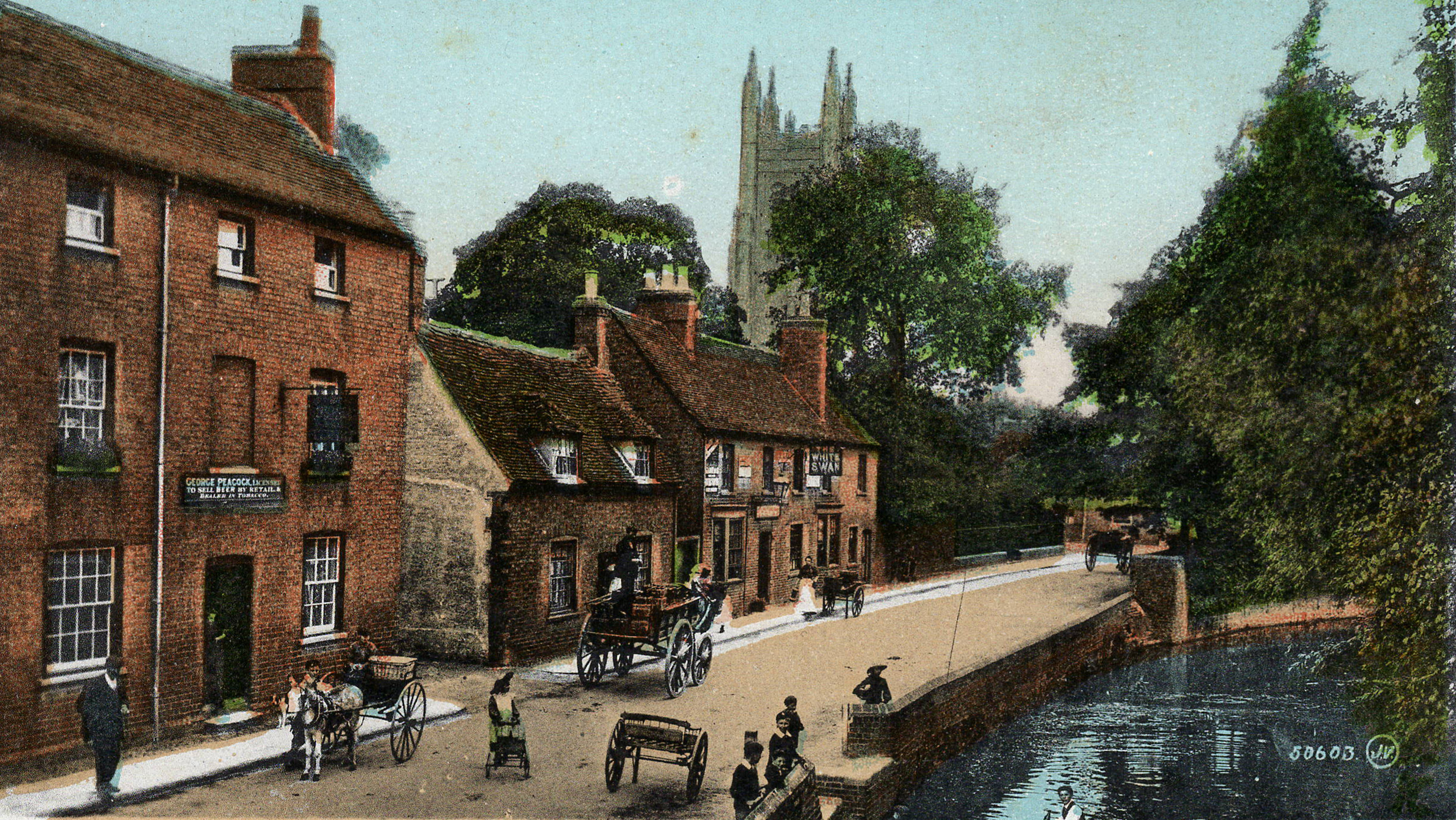
Brook Street, St Neots in 1905

In 1066 AD, William, Duke of Normandy launched an invasion of southern England, and defeated English forces at the Battle of Hastings. The resulting subjugation of the Anglo-Saxon indigenous people is referred to as the Norman Conquest. The Normans found their subject population to be a multiracial mix of Celts, Angles, Saxons and Danes. At Eaton, on the west side of the river, the local chieftain was Ulmar, a thegn (or "thane") and he was superior to two sokemen; the soke was a subsidiary area of land and control. In time the area became known as Soka de Eton by 1247 AD. In 1645 it was known as Eton cum Soca, and in the nineteenth century this had become Eaton Socon.

The manor of Eaton contained two water mills, a church and a priest; there were 38 villein families, seven smallholders and eight tied labourers.

On the east side of the river, there were two manors in Eynesbury: the southern manor was about the same size as Eaton, with about 42 houses and a church. These villagers kept sheep rather than pigs (as at Eaton) and they too had watermills. The northern community had about 25 houses, and it enjoyed fishing rights in the river as well as having a mill. In addition it had the Priory with its relics of Saint Neot, carrying considerable added prestige and income.

== Local Norman control consolidated ==
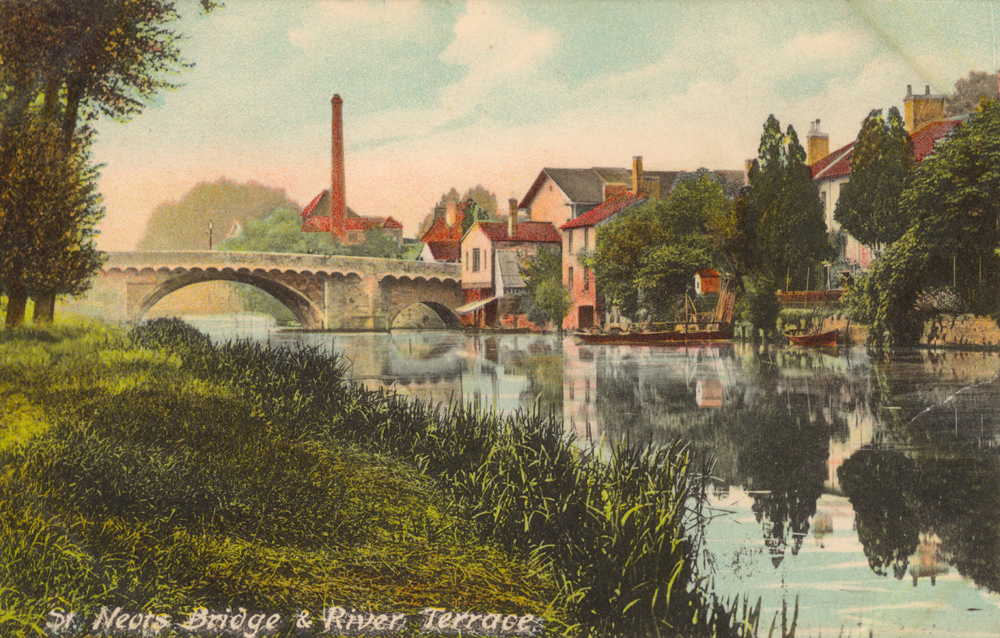
Hand-coloured image of St Neots bridge in 1905

William the Conqueror established his power as King William I, and he had fortifications built to impose local control. One was at Huntingdon, controlling the area east of the River Great Ouse, and another was at Bedford, controlling lands to the west. The local leader was called a baron and the area was a barony. Manors, local centres of agricultural and civil leadership, were allocated to favoured Norman individuals.

The northern manor of Eynesbury, roughly equivalent to modern St Neots, was owned Richard fitz Gilbert and his wife Rohese Giffard, alternatively known as Richard of Clare and Rohaïs, or Roys. Richard owned extensive lands elsewhere, and it may be that Rohaïs was in practical control at Eynesbury. The manor there included the Priory.

The southern manor at Eynesbury, located within present-day Eynesbury, was owned by a Saxon, Earl Waltheof; he had married Judith, who was the niece of King William. In 1075 Waltheof was implicated in a revolt against the King, and was executed, leaving Judith as Countess of the manor.

At Eaton the manor was allocated to Lisois de Moutiers, but by the time of the Domesday Book in 1086 it had been transferred to Eudo Dapifer; he was a steward in the Royal household, and therefore an extremely important person, bringing prestige to Eaton.

== Developments at St Neots Priory ==
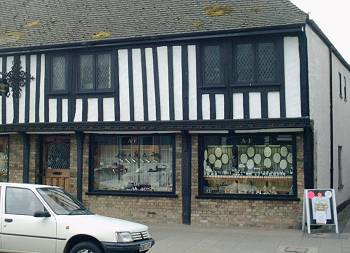
A 15th-century building in St Neots

By the end of the 11th century, the fame of the Priory due to the presence of Neot's remains led progressively to the name St Neots being applied to the area of Eynesbury north of the Hen Brook, and that name is used in the rest of this article.

The existence of the Priory outweighed the agricultural value of the St Neots manor. Some time after 1078 (and to the displeasure of the monastery at Ely) it became a dependant of the important Abbey of Bec in Normandy, whose former Prior Lanfranc had become Archbishop of Canterbury in 1070. Anselm followed Lanfranc as Prior of Bec and was elected Abbot of Bec in place of its founder Herluin in 1078. He took a particular interest in the St Neots Priory, seeing it as a means of developing Benedictine influence, and he made it the most important possession of Bec in England. About 18 monks were transferred from Normandy. Anselm visited St Neots a few years after this time, to "verify" for himself that the relics held in the Priory were indeed the bones of Neot; evidently he was satisfied. On his return to Normandy he took with him the jawbone of the Saint.

The rebuilding of the Priory was complete by 1110, but Richard of Clare had died. Rohaïs was now in sole charge of the entire manor, and gave it to the Priory and its monks at a re-dedication ceremony in 1113. The building consisted of a church with the bell tower, a refectory, a dormitory, a chapter house, and a central cloister area, as well as kitchens, a cellarium for food storage and outbuildings including stables, storage barns, workshops and pigsties. Foundations and column bases have been discovered, as well as other finds including glazed floor tiles, painted wall plaster, fragments of stained glass, and pieces of carved masonry. By this time the Priory was very extensive, stretching from the river nearly as far as New Street, and from the Common to the market square.

While St Neots was making progress, a small religious house was established in Eaton Socon in the 12th century. William of Colmworth and a group of monks, not affiliated to any particular order, was given a site at Bushmead by Hugh de Beauchamp, who had his base in Bedford, in about 1195. After 1215 the site became an Augustinian priory, but it never rivalled the prestige of the St Neots priory.

== Secular developments ==
About 1130 a weekly market on Thursdays was authorised to be held in St Neots, as well as four fairs annually. The St Neots market is said to be one of four early "plantation" markets, in effect new towns. This brought further income to the Priory. The market was held on a site very close to the present-day market square, immediately south of the Priory. In a further development, a wooden bridge was built in 1180, at the location of the present-day bridge; tolls were collected by the Priory. There had long been river-crossings – probably fords, or ferries – at Coneygeare and Crosshall, and these now fell into disuse. The Crosshall ford was further north than the present-day bridge: Crosshall Road from the junction with the Great North Road may have been constructed so as to aim in a straight line for the Priory and the ford. The existence of the market, and the visits of pilgrims to Neot's relics, encouraged the establishment of permanent trading places, and by 1180 St Neots was granted permission to form a parish of its own, independent of Eynesbury, and the name of St Neots, long used informally, was now made official.

Hugh de Beauchamp built a castle in present-day Eaton Socon around 1140. It was probably of timber construction with earthworks and may never have been completed, but the earth mound still exists. The castle was built during a period of civil war over the succession to the throne. Matilda was the heir to King Henry I but a faction of barons supported Stephen. In the civil war that followed several fortified positions were quickly thrown up in support of Stephen, and Eaton Socon Castle was one of them. Stephen's supporters won and he was installed as king. When he died in 1154, Matilda's son Henry succeeded as King Henry II. One of his first acts was to order the demolition of the castles, which were referred to as adulterine.

Some habitable accommodation must have remained, and was occupied in the 13th century by a Lady Juliana de Beauchamp. Notwithstanding its demolition, the castle and the remaining residential occupation conferred considerable prestige on Eaton.

Around 1204, a new parish church was built in St Neots, fragments of which can still be found in the fifteenth century church which now stands on the site - a separate parish of St Neots was created out of the parish of Eynesbury in 1204 by William of Blois, Bishop of Lincoln (in whose Diocese the town remained until 1837). Both Eynesbury and Eaton Socon parish churches were rebuilt around the same time; the North Arcade in Eynesbury church is probably the oldest substantial remains from this time. The Priory became highly respected and extremely wealthy during this period, and the settlements of Eynesbury, St Neots, and Eaton Socon were prosperous too. The increasing river and road traffic further enhanced the importance of the three communities, all of which flourished.

Throughout the 12th and 13th centuries, the prestige of the area and the Priory, and the commercial benefit of the main highways passing through, increased the importance of the towns. In 1156 King Henry II visited, staying at the Priory and bringing a very large retinue. King Henry III visited the priory, staying there in 1229, 1235 and 1236.

== The Hundred Years War and the Black Death ==
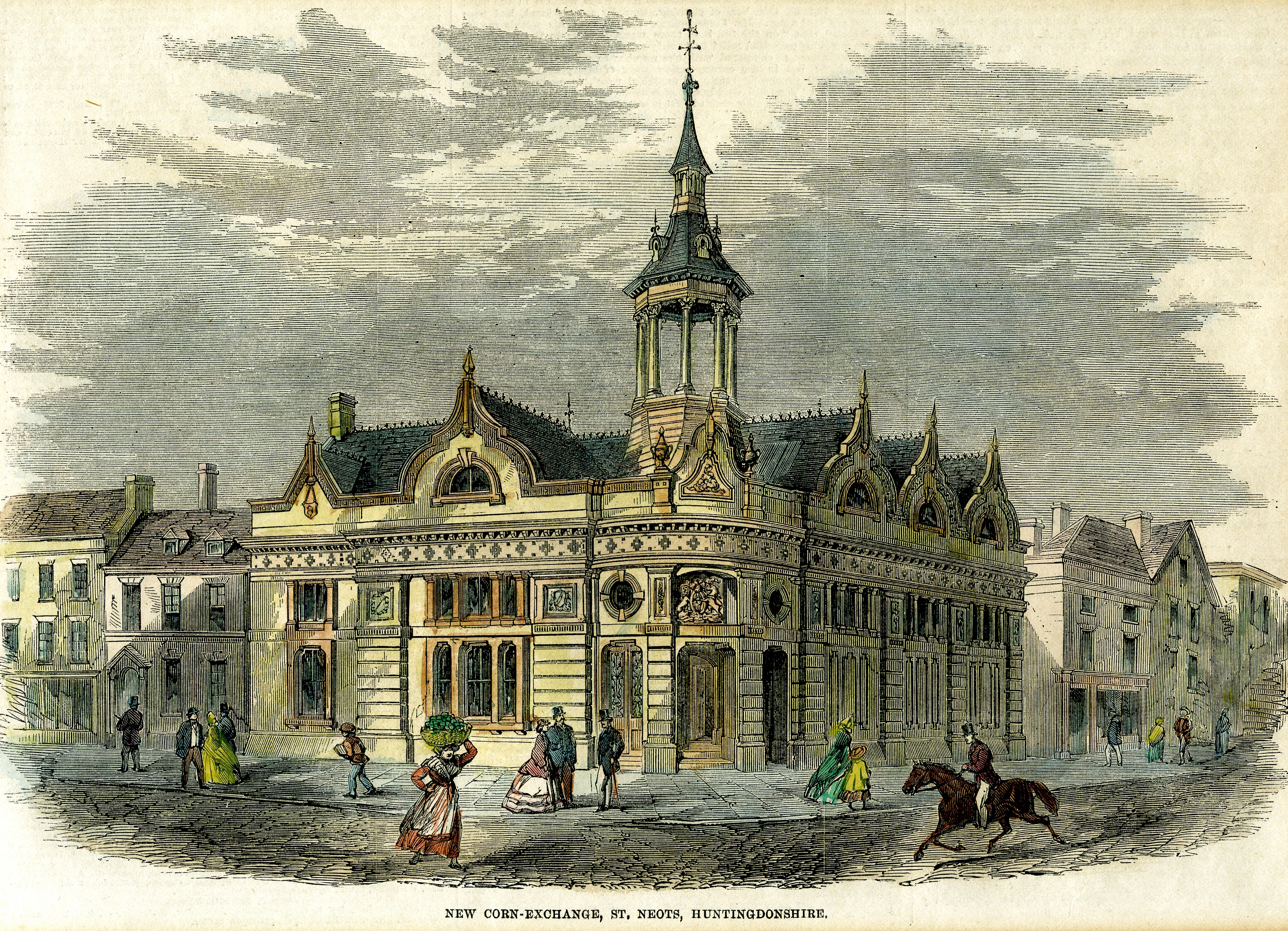
St Neots Corn Exchange in 1860; the turret was removed in 1929

The Priory and the town suffered two major setbacks in the fourteenth century. The Hundred Years' War (1337 - 1453) involved bitter enmity between England and France. The Priory was a subsidiary of the Norman Abbey of Bec, and was regarded with suspicion as an alien outpost. This drastically reduced its income from pilgrimages as well as leading to administrative financial sanctions. In 1409 the Priory was given its independence by Bec, and this allowed it slowly to regain a limited prosperity.

The editor of the Victoria History puts it rather differently: "... in 1412, the priory was declared independent of Bec, on the ground that divine service was neglected and revenues diminished by maladministration. An English prior, Edward Salisbury, was placed in charge, under obedience to the diocesan..."

In 1348 the Black Death broke out, resulting in the death of about a third of the population, and extreme fear of ordinary travel; pilgrimages to the Priory were unsafe. As well as more widespread devastation, it is believed that the plague wiped out the village of Sudbury, which was located at the junction of Crosshall Road and the Great North Road.

== Surviving buildings ==
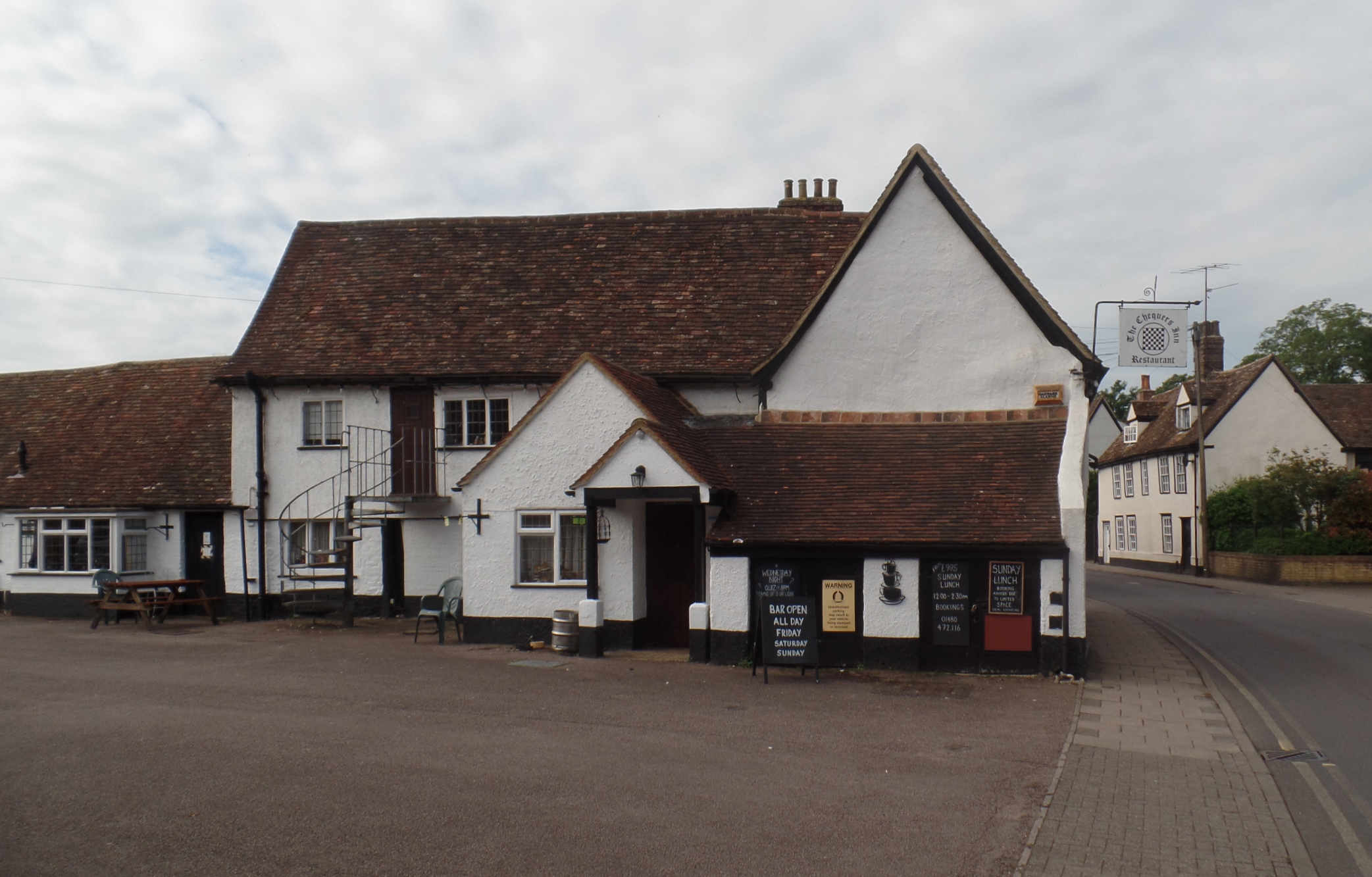
The Chequers, Eynesbury

Very few secular buildings have survived from the 15th century. A fine timber-framed building erected in the 15th has been revealed at the corner of Church Walk in St Neots. It is believed to have been built for a wealthy corn merchant. From the same period is the Old Falcon on the Market Square: its now dilapidated frontage conceals a much older interior. Eynesbury's oldest surviving secular mediaeval building is The Chequers in St Mary's Street. Although roughly dated to the early 16th century it is likely to have been there a century earlier.

== Tudor period, 1485 - 1603 ==
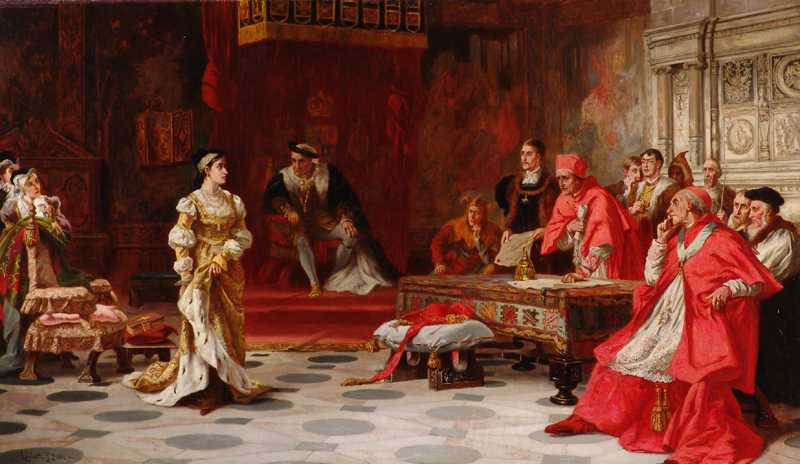
Katherine of Aragon Denounced Before King Henry VIII and His Council

Henry VIII became King of England in 1509, and when he severed the connection with the Roman Catholic Church, he brought about the Dissolution of the Monasteries, when he disbanded and physically destroyed most of the country's monasteries. St Neots Priory was closed in 1534, the remaining 12 monks being pensioned off. Many buildings and land, and movable possessions were confiscated and sold off, or given to the King's friends. Crucially there is no record of what happened to the bones of Neot. Eight years later, the buildings and land were sold, while the manor was given to the King's daughter Elizabeth, later to become Queen Elizabeth I. The site was built over by a brewery in Victorian times.

In 1591, there were 879 people living in Eaton Socon; as Eynesbury and St Neots may each have been a similar size, this suggests a total population of at least 2,000. St Neots Grammar School was in existence by 1556 when the schoolmaster was a Mr Faucet.

== St Neots Town Bridge ==
The first bridge across the River Great Ouse at St Neots was probably built in the 11th or 12th century to bring traders and pilgrims into the market place established by the monks of St Neots Priory: it probably replaced a ford. It was constructed entirely in timber and, because there were marshy areas both sides of the river, it included a long causeway.

In 1588, a new town bridge was built. A survey of the old bridge showed that it consisted of 72 arches, and it was 704 feet in length and 7 ft 6 in wide. The replacement bridge was to have masonry piers up to the flood water level. The river formed the boundary between Bedfordshire and Huntingdonshire, so both counties had to contribute to the costs of materials and labour.

The town bridge was replaced again, probably in 1617, but this time entirely in masonry. The bridge was clearly of great importance as it allowed river traffic to pass without hindrance (by elimination of the ford), and commerce was becoming increasingly important. Other improvements in the same period included river work to improve navigability. In 1670 the River Ouse (Bedfordshire) Navigation Act was passed for improvements to the River Ouse, to enable navigation as far as Bedford.

During the 19th century the superstructure of the bridge was widened and the "scallops" peculiar to the Huntingdonshire half were carried across the whole length of the parapet. (The scallops were in fact jack-arches supported on cantilever beams, supporting the footway extensions.) The end of the bridge at Eaton Ford was also widened to make less of a bottle-neck.

The old stone bridge survived well into the 20th century, but it proved inadequate for the weight of modern motor traffic, even when passage over it was restricted to one-way operation. There was a five mph speed limit. Because of its position on a county boundary, the negotiations regarding its replacement were prolonged, taking over 20 years to complete. Finally in 1964, the "picturesque but fragile structure was demolished and work began on the present more practical bridge".

== Stuart and Civil War period ==
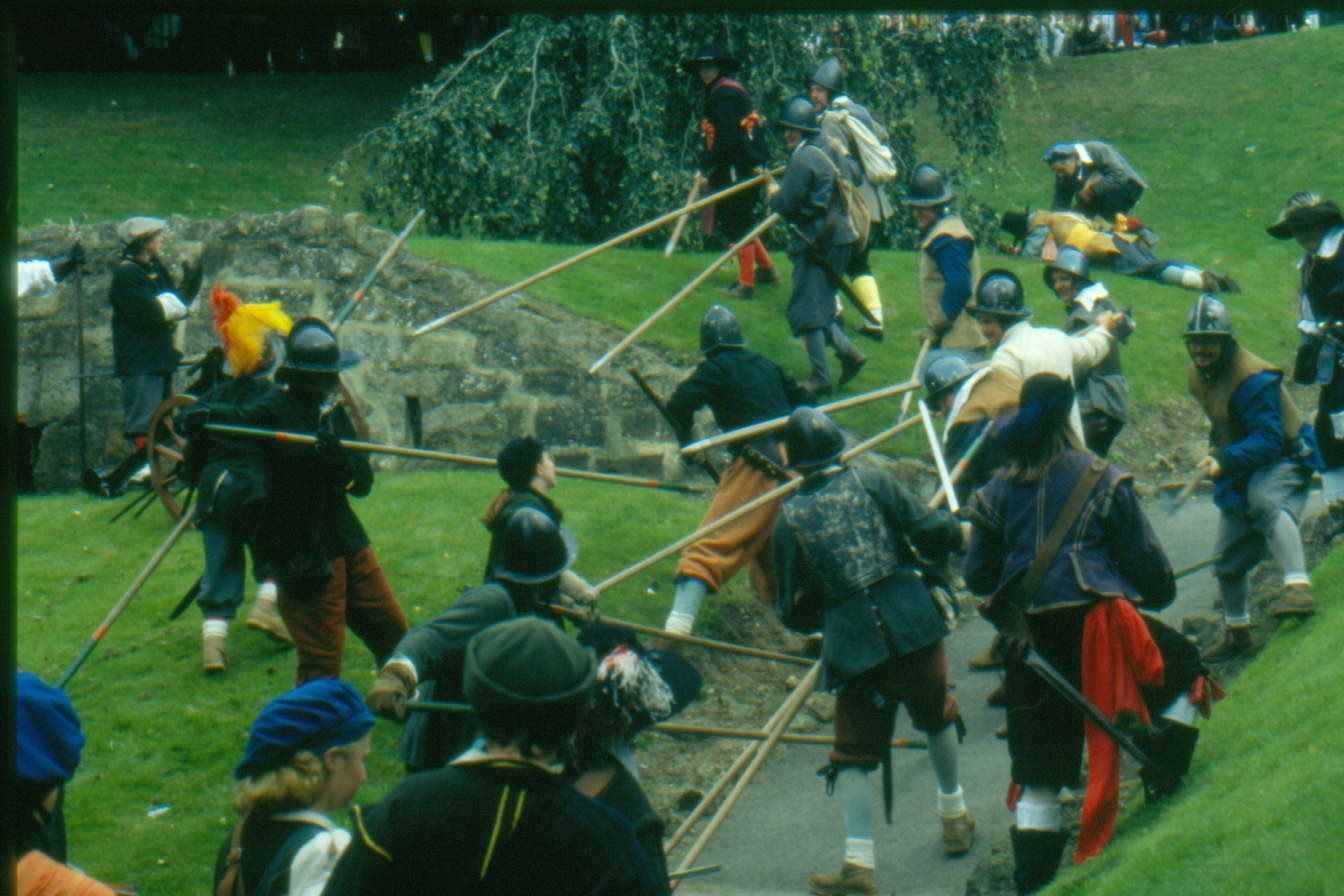
ACivil War re-enactment

St Neots Manor passed from royal ownership under King James I to Sir Sidney Montague. In the First Civil War, he supported the Royalist or Cavalier cause although his nephew, Edward, supported Parliament. As in most parts of the country, loyalties were mixed, but St Neots was firmly in Parliamentary hands and a detachment of Roundhead troops guarded the town. However, King Charles I passed through the town in 1645 and gathered willing recruits from local people.

On 10 July 1648 during the Second Civil War, a small battle took place when a group of 300 Royalists camped in the Market Square overnight. They were surprised, and overcome by a smaller group of Roundheads advancing across the bridge, and most of them were taken prisoner.

From 1653 there was a period known as The Protectorate when Parliament ruled the country under Oliver Cromwell. During this time much destruction -- even desecration -- of religious decoration took place, as it offended the strict philosophies of the Puritans. After seven years the monarchy was restored under King Charles II.

Things gradually returned to normal, and many buildings in St Neots and Eynesbury were constructed in the years following the Restoration. There were 543 houses in the town in 1674 when records were taken for the Hearth Tax (though some of these may have been in nearby villages). The Waggon and Horses public house in Eynesbury, and Ford House in Eaton Ford date from this period. Conversely Eynesbury Church was allowed to fall into disrepair, until in 1684 the spire collapsed, causing extensive damage. The building was repaired and the current tower was built in 1687.

== Resurgence of religion ==
The first dissenting chapel in the district was built at Hail Weston, and a Congregational church Meeting House was established on the north side of St Neots High Street in 1718. The chapel was enlarged for larger congregations in 1889. Meanwhile, Baptists who broke away from the Congregationalists in 1800, established a chapel in New Street. Methodism started in St Neots as a result of a visit by John Wesley in 1772, and the first Methodist chapel was built at the corner of Huntingdon Street in 1794. Other chapels built in the period include the Salvation Army citadel in 1891, and a chapel in New Street and one in East Street now converted for use by the Roman Catholic Church. In 1883, the Salvationists were accused by the magistrates of "thrusting their religious views upon the public in an ostentatious manner". By the time of the 1851 Census, there were as many Non-Conformists worshipping on Sundays as there were members of the Church of England.

It was a time of religious revival which showed itself not only in the growth of new denominations but also in the revival of the parish church. In 1847, at a cost of over £2,000, the church was refloored and the pews were renewed, with much stonework substantially repaired. A particularly fine set of stained-glass windows were put in between 1859 and 1902, largely paid for by C P Rowley. A new organ by George Holdich of London was installed in 1855.

In 1863 the Corn Exchange was erected on the corner of High Street and South Street. It was intended as an indoor market for farmers, but it also served as a venue for concerts and meetings, and after 1887, it housed a museum. Other facilities were provided by the Library and Literary Institute, founded in 1881, the Liberal Club, and the Constitutional Club, founded in 1895. There was a Workmen's Club at Eaton Socon from 1880, meeting in the school, and at Eynesbury a Reading Room was established in the school there in 1868.

== Lords of the Manor ==
The Lordship of the Manor was acquired by the Rowley family in 1902. The Rowleys first appear on the scene, however, in the 18th century at Upper Wintringham when they acquired the house formerly owned by the Payne family. Then in 1793, Owsley Rowley bought Priory Farm at the north end of Huntingdon Street from his father-in-law William King. He set about laying out the farm as parkland -- it amounted to 1,263 acres -- and, in 1798, he built a large house on it. Rowley's purchases of land, much of it to the east of the railway line, including Monks Hardwick Farm, the Mill at Little Paxton made him probably the most powerful man in the town, long before the family became Lords of the manor. He was a Justice of the peace and chairman of the Court of quarter sessions for 25 years.

On his death in 1824, his son George William Rowley succeeded and acquired the advowson of St Neots in 1864. Owsley Rowley's third grandson, Charles Perceval Rowley, who lived at Wintringham, was responsible for ten of the stained glass windows in St Neots Parish church. The second son, George Dawson Rowley became famous as an explorer and ornithologist. Some of his collection of stuffed birds is now in the British Museum. He and his father died within hours of each other in 1878, to be succeeded by his only son George Fydell Rowley.

== Support for the poor ==
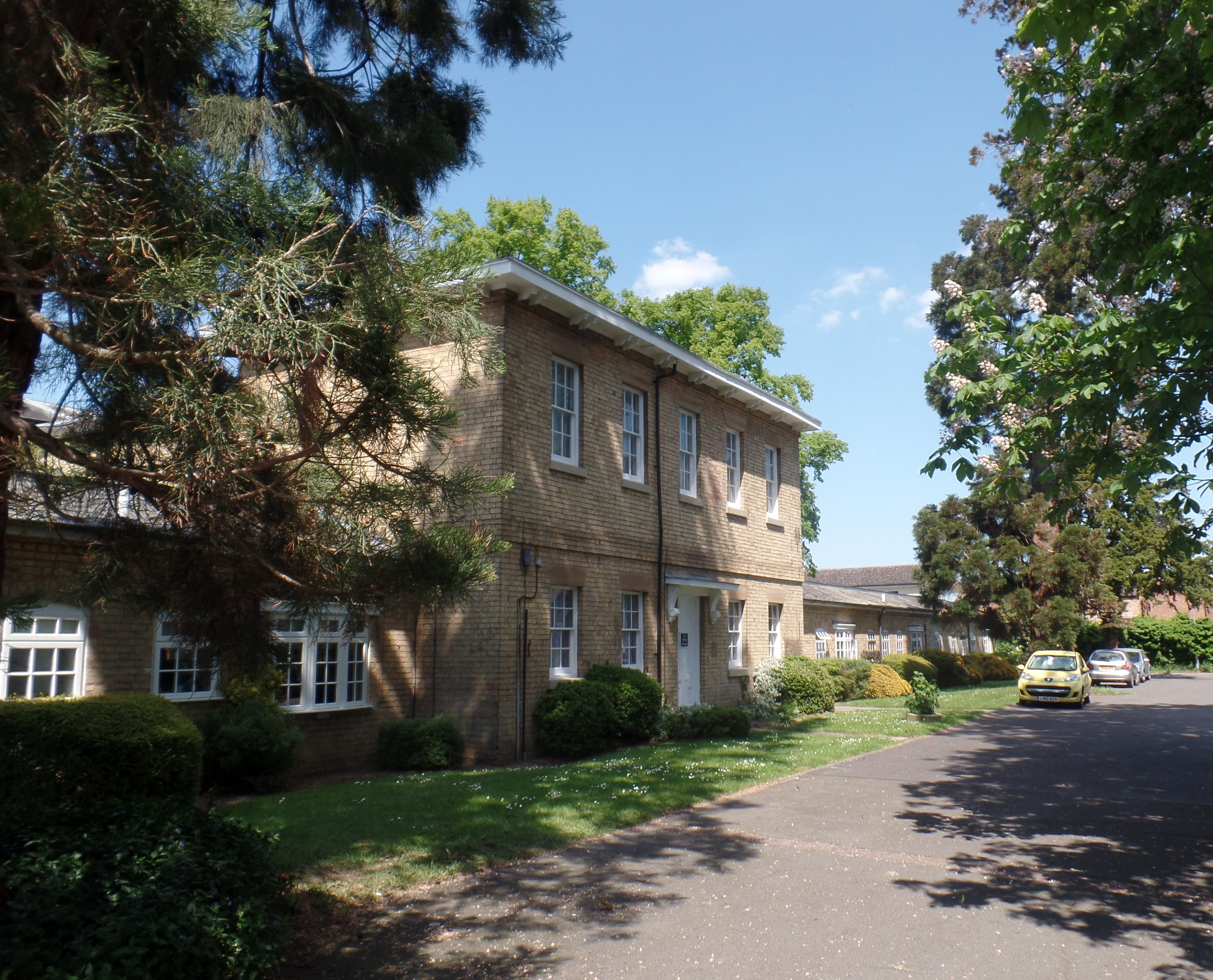
Former workhouse building in Eaton Ford

As the structure of society changed with the agricultural revolution and the early stages of the industrial revolution it became obvious that some organised system for supporting the destitute was necessary. St Neots and Eaton Socon had had local workhouses since 1722 and 1719 respectively. This became known as indoor relief, where the poor were given accommodation and food instead of money, and were put to work if they were capable of it. The Workhouse system was introduced nationwide following the Poor Law Amendment Act 1834.

This resulted in the formation of St Neots Poor Law Union on 24 September 1835. After some difficulty in finding a suitable site, a workhouse was built in Eaton Socon (the location is now considered to be in Eaton Ford). Its capacity was 250 persons. A separate infirmary block was ready in 1879, increasing the limited capacity of the workhouse.

The workhouse closed in that role in the late 1920s, and the building was used as a hospital for the elderly. It was renamed the White House. In the 1950s part of the building at the rear was converted into flats and in the 1980s the entire building was drastically converted, and was made into residential flats.

== Turnpikes and stage coaches ==
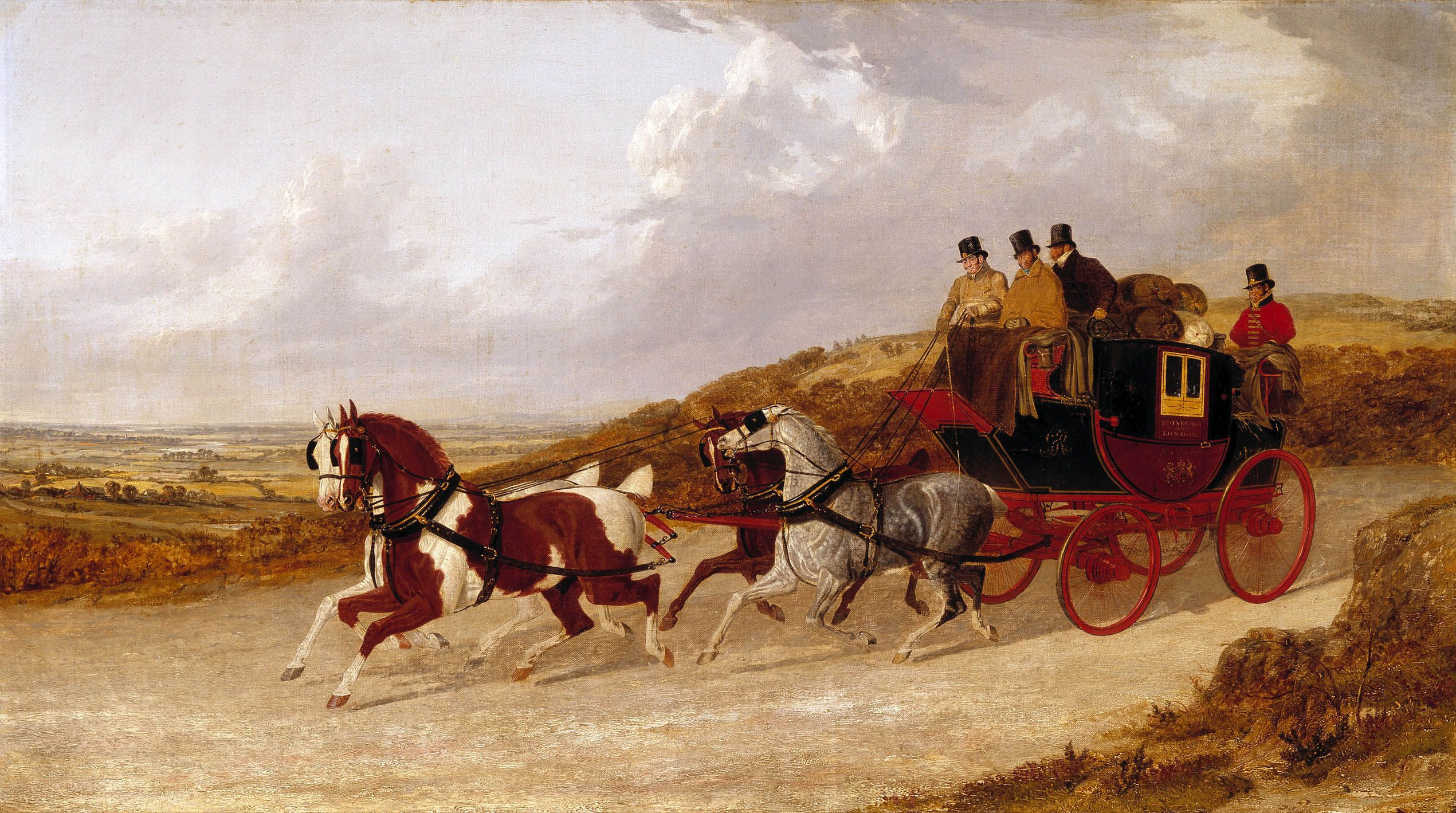
The Edinburgh and London Royal Mail

In the 18th century new ideas and ways of life began to develop, and the pace quickened as the decades passed. The roads that were adequate for static populations in the sixteenth century, were becoming a hindrance to the commercial progress. Local people were responsible for the maintenance, but "That a route connecting two great towns which have a large and thriving trade with each other should be maintained at the cost of the rural population scattered between them is obviously unjust." While stagecoaches catch the imagination, it must be remembered that slow goods carts formed a considerable traffic also.

By 1700 a few turnpikes had been set up: a turnpike was a toll road: the toll income was used to maintain the road surface. Eventually local Acts of Parliament were passed to enable Turnpike Trusts to manage sections of road. In 1725 a Trust was established to manage the Great North Road between Biggleswade and Alconbury. Another was founded in 1772 to manage part of the road between Cambridge and St Neots.

Improved roads meant more travelling and the number of coaches and carriages passing through St Neots and Eaton Socon increased. It was during the 18th century that road travel reached its zenith, when the stagecoach was introduced. Teams of horses were changed at intervals of 10 or 12 miles, known as stages, enabling the coach to keep going, stopping only for the change, and for meal stops. Coaching inns along the line of route arranged the feed and rest of the unharnessed horses, and had them ready at the specified time for the next run by the same coach operator. Overnight accommodation was provided, as any long transit took several days. Feed for the horses was the largest expense for the operators.

By 1754 coaches were travelling from London as far as Edinburgh (taking 8 or 9 days). At the height of stagecoach activity there were 20 coaches passing through Eaton Socon daily, "some of them going straight up the Great North Road after changing horses at The White Horse and others taking the loop through St Neots. At The Cross Keys Inn mail was collected as well as passengers".

At this time stagecoach travel was at its peak. Some coaches took the loop into St Neots and some passed through Eaton Socon. The two routes converged again at Alconbury Hill with stagecoaches using the Old North Road, the stretch from there to Norman Cross was the busiest length of road in England. Stagecoaches passed along this section at the rate of one every 20 minutes day and night, and the Bell Inn at Stilton, where teams of horses were changed, had stabling for over 300 horses.

== Education ==
In 1736 a school for 35 "poor boys" was established at St Neots; by the end of the century there was a school for poor children, and both sexes were taught. Classes were held at first in the Jesus Chapel of St Neots Church, but after 1745 they moved elsewhere. In 1760 Alderman Newton of Leicester left money in his will for the benefit of schools in Huntingdonshire and the school at St Neots received £26 to clothe as well as educate poor boys.

Huntingdonshire Education Committee long resisted the provision of a secondary school in St Neots; in 1926 about a hundred pupils travelled to Huntingdon every day to school. Following the enactment of the Education Act 1944, grammar schools were established. Local politicians in St Neots called for one to be provided, but it was said that there were not enough grammar pupils in St Neots to justify such a school. At this time Eaton Socon was in Bedfordshire, so a number of St Neots pupils travelled daily to school in Huntingdon, and a corresponding number of Eaton Socon pupils travelled daily to Biggleswade.

It was not until 1960 that a secondary school was established in St Neots. Eaton Socon was still in Bedfordshire, which complicated the position, and St Neots grammar school pupils still had to make a daily journey to Huntingdon. It was not until the establishment of Longsands and Ernulf comprehensive schools in 1966 and 1971 that full secondary education provision was made in St. Neots.

== The nineteenth century ==
=== Industrialisation ===
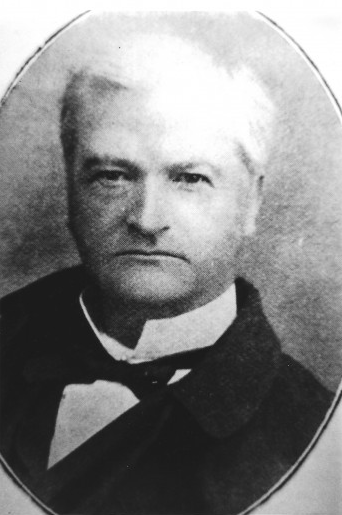
George Bower, about 1880

The oldest forms of industry grew out of the needs of agriculture. Corn milling was practised at Duloe using a windmill and at Eaton Socon using water power, and a malt mill was established in 1604. Industrialisation proper began in St Neots as elsewhere in the 18th century. The most notable contribution of St Neots was in the field of paper making. In 1808 Sealy and Henry Fourdrinier invented a process by which paper could be made in a continuous roll and it was at St Neots Mill (in Little Paxton) that the process was first put into action. The machines were powered by water, but later steam turbines were used.

Despite the technical success, the Fourdrinier brothers failed financially. Their business was taken over by Matthew Towgood. Towgood and his sons operated the mill until the early 1880s, when it was taken over by the St Neots Paper Mill Company.

A bell foundry was established in 1735 by Joseph Eayre. The foundry was in the conical building later called the 'Oast House' within the Brewery grounds. Eayre's business was continued by Edward Arnold and then Robert Taylor. Taylor was required to leave the brewery site near the end of the century, and for around two decades cast bells in the Cambridge Street area, before moving, in about the year 1820, to Oxford. The family business later moved again to Loughborough where it continues - in 2020 it was the last remaining bell foundry in England.

Brewing took on a more industrial character in the 18th century. James Paine acquired William Foster's brewery in the Market Square in 1831. The Priory Brewery, on the site of the old Priory, which was owned by the Fowler family, was sold to John Day of Bedford in 1814. John Day also provided St Neots with its first street lamps.

Writing in 1820 Gorham records that

The river Ouse is navigable from the port of Lynn to St. Neot's,[sic] and thence to Bedford. A considerable trade is carried on in corn, wine, coals, iron, timber, &c. The average breadth of the stream is 150 feet. The greater part of the town being a few feet above the ordinary level of the river, inundations are sometimes consequent upon sudden thaws or very heavy rains, to such an extent as to render a navigation of the streets not merely practicable but necessary.

St. Neots also became famous for the manufacture of gas appliances. George Bower (1826 or 1827 - 1911) built a foundry for making gas fires, light fittings and gas cookers. His business was successful for many years -- at its height his factory employed 200 workers -- until a major South American purchaser defaulted and Bower went bankrupt.

=== Railways ===
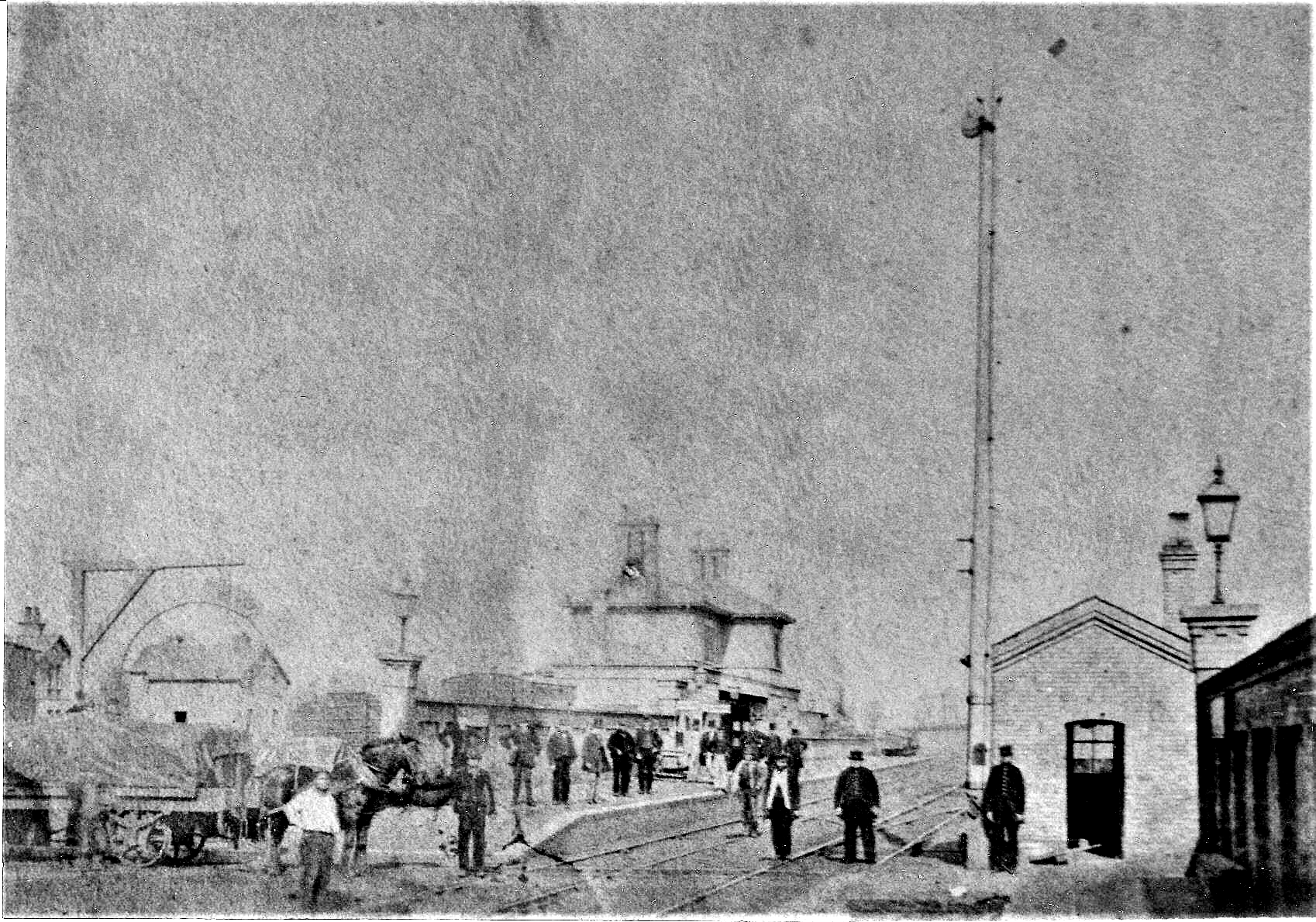
St Neots railway station just after opening in 1850

On 7 August 1850, a railway opened to the public through St Neots: the Great Northern Railway opened its line from a temporary station in London at Maiden Lane, to Peterborough. In succeeding years the company opened throughout from Kings Cross to Doncaster, and with other friendly railway companies, reached York and Edinburgh as well as much of Yorkshire, and later the Nottinghamshire coalfields and the east coast ports.

At St Neots the route planned by the railway lay well to the east of the town. This was done to avoid taking land from Priory Park, the estate of George William Rowley. The eastward alignment made an awkward location for the station; Parliamentary Committees scrutinised railway bills, and at this early date the Lords Committee was heavily favourable to land owners. Protracted argument in Committee would cost a fortune in money the promoters did not have. (Note: When the Great Northern Railway finally obtained its authorising Act of Parliament, its Parliamentary expenses -- mostly legal fees -- amounted to £590,335, equating to about £70 million in modern money.) Rowley had tried to force the railway company to adopt a route to the west of St Neots, far from his estate, but this was refused by Parliament, and the railway's compromise route was confirmed. This still took some land from Rowley's property, and this was valued by the railway's valuer at £8,000. Rowley demanded £12,000, which he later increased to £15,000. The matter had to be settled by a jury trial; the jury valuation went ahead, and returned a value of £8,000, exactly as the railway company had already offered.

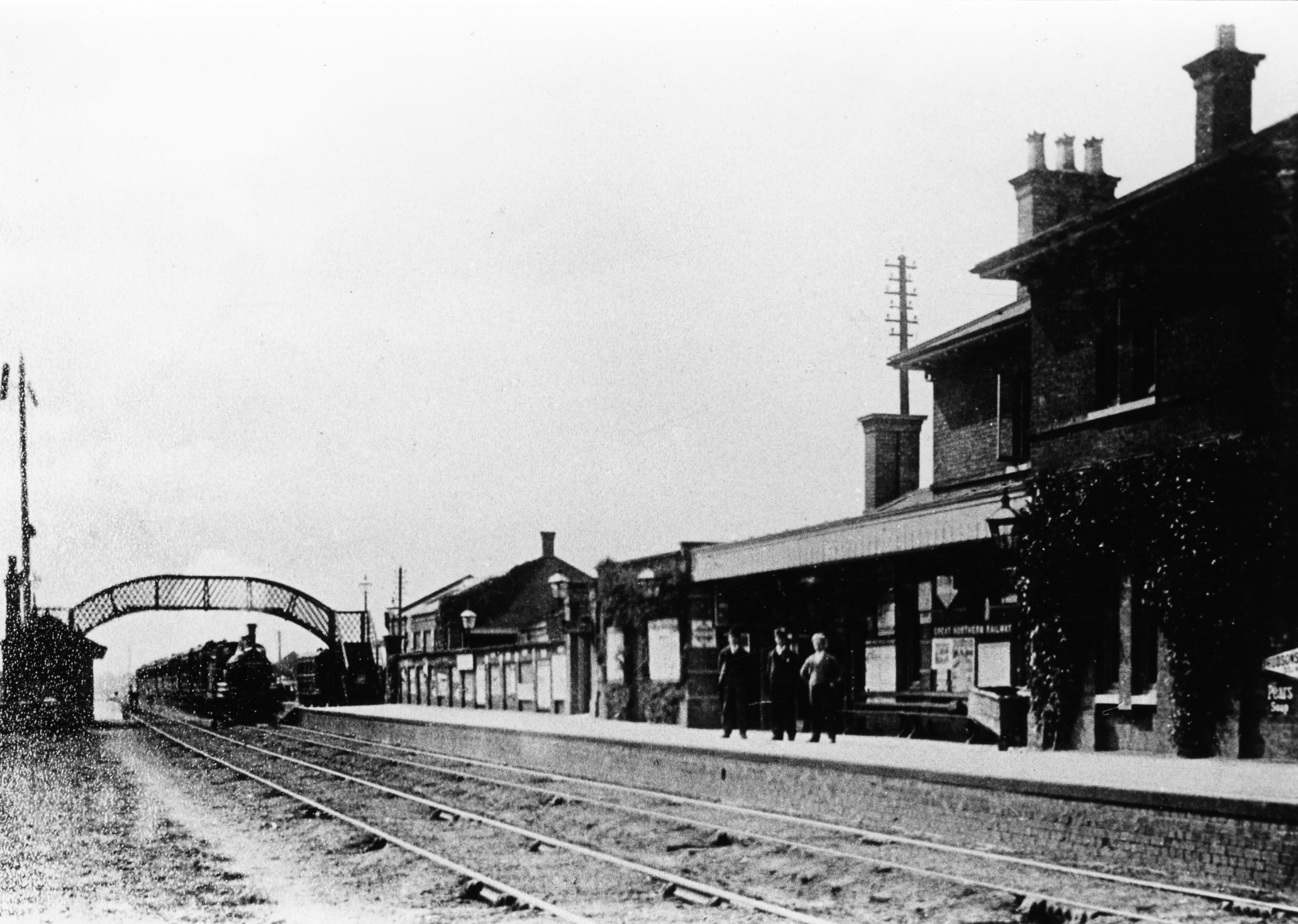
St Neots railway station and approaching train, around 1865

The railway rapidly ousted the stagecoaches. Apart from long-distance trains that reduced the time of travel to Scotland to less than a day, there were soon excursions to holiday resorts such as Skegness and Cromer, and also to London. However by far the biggest influence of the railway in the nineteenth century was the transport of goods and minerals: manufactured goods outward, and heavy commodities inward: coal, lime for improving soil, and cattle feed. Coal in particular: the price of coal often reduced by 80% the day after a town acquired a railway connection.

Unfortunately for St Neots, the rise of the railways led to the destruction of the stagecoach trade that had brought so much prosperity to the area. Long distance stagecoach travel was quickly wiped out, and river traffic declined steeply too: Bedford and St Neots merchants and farmers no longer required river transport for their materials. Employment in support of stagecoach travel, and water transport, collapsed. Toll income on the Upper Ouse was £7,656 in 1842 but fell to £4,508 in 1815; for the years 1852 to 1863 it averaged £1,974 per annum.

Nevertheless St Neots revived its industry and trade; returning prosperity was signalled when the Corn Exchange opened in 1863, and a livestock market was opened in the 1890s.

== Assassination of the Prime Minister ==
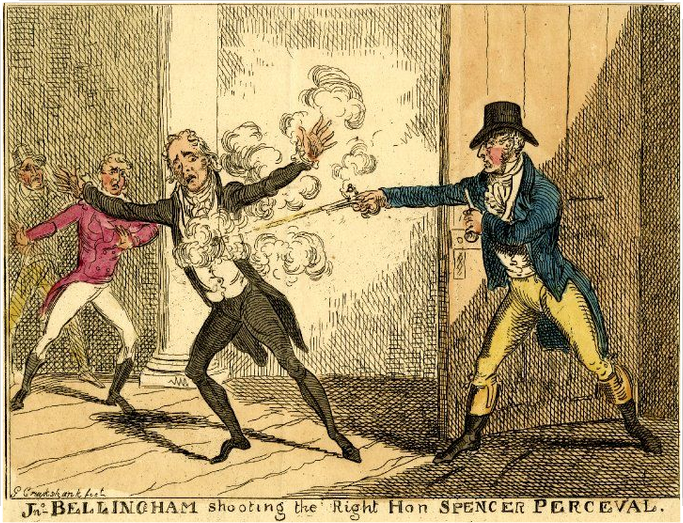
Assassination of the Prime Minister

On 11 May 1812, John Bellingham shot and killed the Prime Minister, Spencer Perceval. Bellingham was born in St Neots and had travelled widely for business purposes. He seems to have been defrauded and imprisoned in Russia, and on his return he attracted no help from the British Government. Harbouring extreme resentment, he carried out the assassination. He was immediately caught, and hanged a week later.

== Local government ==
The historic parish of St Neots was governed by its vestry, in the same way as most rural areas, until 1819 when the more built-up part of the parish was given improvement commissioners. In 1876 the commissioners' district was reconstituted as a local government district run by an elected local board. The district was enlarged at the same time to also include part of the neighbouring parish of Eynesbury, including the old village itself.

The establishment of Poor Law Unions, and from 1877 the setting up of a national system of prisons eroded the role of the Justices of the Peace. Elected County Councils were introduced in 1888.

Such local government districts were in turn reconstituted as urban districts under the Local Government Act 1894. That act also required that parishes could no longer straddle district boundaries, and so in 1895 the two parishes of St Neots and Eynesbury were both reduced to just cover the parts within the St Neots Urban District. The part of St Neots parish outside the urban district became a parish called St Neots Rural, and the part of Eynesbury outside the urban district became a parish called Eynesbury Hardwicke.

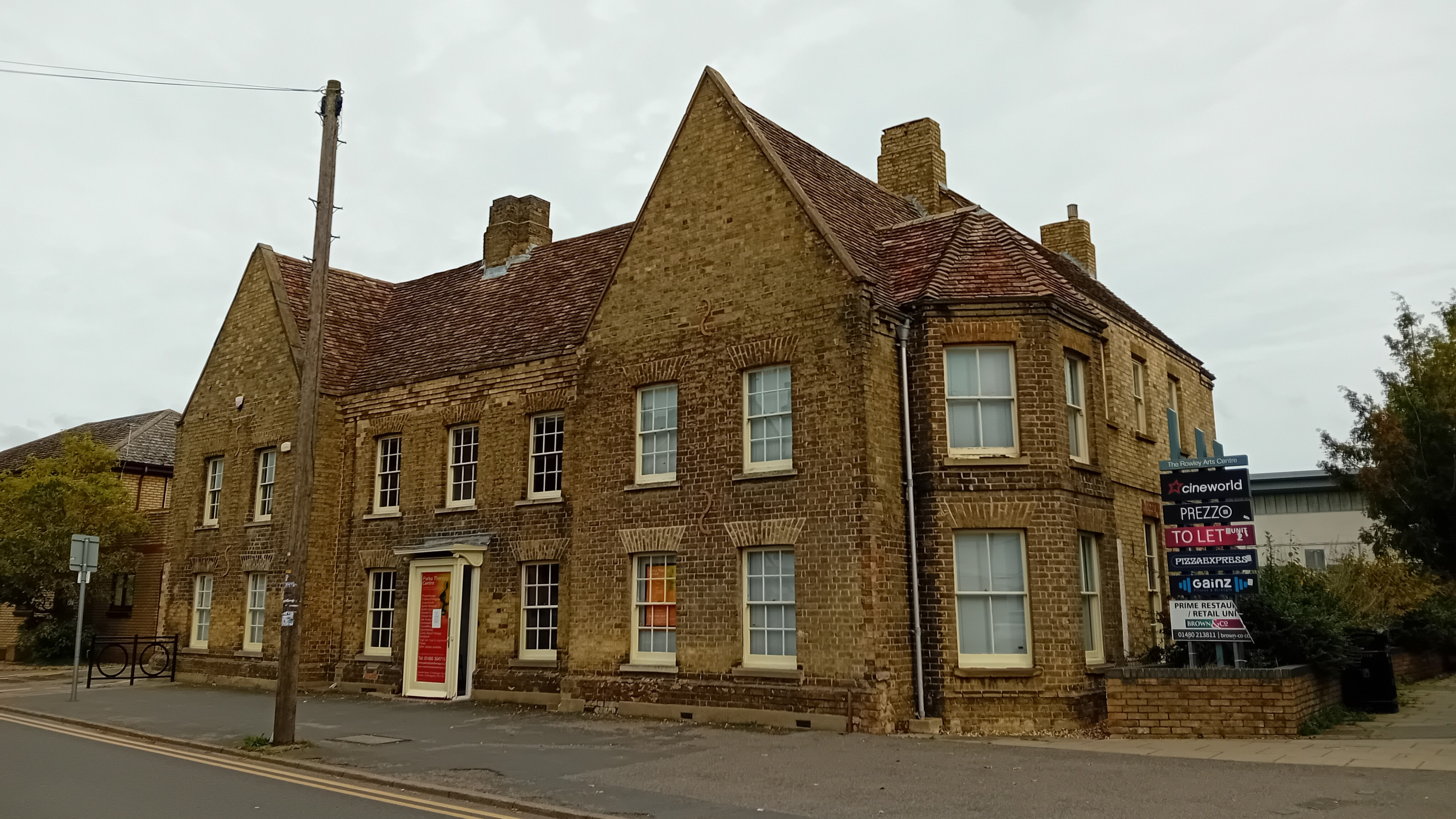
Cressner House, 12 Huntingdon Street

In 1938, the urban district council bought a large early 19th century house called Cressner (or Cressener) House at 12 Huntingdon Street and converted it to become its offices and meeting place.

In the early 1960s, serious proposals were put forward to reorganise the areas controlled by local government in the area. As it seemed likely that Huntingdonshire would be disbanded, it was repeatedly said by some that St Neots would prefer to join Bedfordshire rather than Cambridgeshire, as the town had limited affinity with the fen towns. A counterargument was that Bedfordshire had done little to improve Eaton Socon, whereas Huntingdonshire had done much to improve St Neots.

On 1 April 1965, Huntingdonshire was combined with the Soke of Peterborough to form an enlarged county. At the same time the urban area of Eaton Socon and Eaton Ford was transferred to St Neots Urban District, unifying the administrative control of the community. In 1974 Huntingdonshire and the Soke of Peterborough were finally merged with Cambridgeshire and the Isle of Ely, the entire new county being known as Cambridgeshire. The Huntingdonshire County Council therefore disappeared in 1974. The name of Huntingdonshire was maintained by the formation of Huntingdon District Council, which functions as a unit within the enlarged county of Cambridgeshire. The boundaries of the HDC are very similar to those of the former county of Huntingdonshire, with the addition of Eaton Socon and Eaton Fords. Huntingdon District Council altered its title to Huntingdonshire District Council on 1 October 1984. In 1973 St Neots had been granted power to create St Neots Town Council, to perpetuate some of the powers for the former St Neots UDC, which was abolished.

== Water mains and sewerage ==
In May 1885, the members of St Neots Local Board met Mr Spear, a Local Government Inspector, to discuss sanitation in the town. Spear drew attention to many of the cottages which were at that time crammed into the yards and courts behind other buildings. "Day's Court, for example, I find badly paved, very dilapidated, no windows in the bedrooms except into the court... and in this court are situated some foul privy pits." New buildings were considered to be little better. "In the new cottages in East Street the drains are only unsocketed pipes and the sewer gas escapes into the houses... Your Medical Officer of Health speaks almost pathetically of the sanitary conditions of the district, he speaks of the people drinking their own excrement." The Local Board were unmoved by this dramatic report.

This attitude persisted for another twelve years, when a group of local businessmen made sure that St Neots got a minimal water supply, and some semblance of a sewerage system: in 1898 the St Neots Water Company was formed. Pipes conveyed water to some houses and a septic tank system coped with some of the sewage disposal. In 1907 the local authority, by this time the Urban District Council, took the sanitation services over, but it was still by no means a solution to all the town's problems. There was still much open-drain sewerage, and wells were also in use in many homes. In 1914 there were only 250 "better class" homes on the main sewer, with 800 houses using pail privies and even a few earth closets. Water was being supplied to five hundred customers, but the wells were used elsewhere. Twice as much money was spent on scavenging as on sewerage in 1915, and as late as 1931 there were still 700 homes out of a total of 1,250 that were without proper sanitation. It was not until 1936 that St Neots at last acquired a sewage works.

== The river in the nineteenth and twentieth centuries ==
The river had been a major transport route before the railways: Navigation Wharf and Hen Brook were crowded with barges bringing commodities into the town, and many more barges passed from King's Lynn to Bedford, or onto the River Ivel for Biggleswade and Shefford. After the arrival of the railway in St Neots in 1850, the usage of the river for heavy goods transport declined steeply. The Ivel closed to commercial traffic in 1876 and by 1878 no barges went further upriver than St Neots. By 1890 they were only going up as far as St Ives. The river began to silt up and became choked with weeds. The owner of the navigation rights was John Kirkham; in 1892 he tried to sell the rights, and at first no-one wanted them. Then Leonard Taylor Simpson bought the rights in February 1893, for £6,170. He expended a great deal on improvements to locks and conservancy, but the low level of toll charges, set by statute in the 17th century, made profitability impossible. He lost a lot of money.

In September 1897, Simpson saw that his task was impossible, and he closed the navigation, physically securing the locks to make them impassable. A suit in Chancery was started, arguing that he had an obligation to maintain the river navigation, and also to limit his toll charges to the level originally determined. Appeal and counter-appeal followed, but in 1904 the House of Lords ruled in his favour, allowing him to close the navigation. He did so in August 1904.

The Great Ouse Catchment Board acquired the worthless navigation from him in 1934.

The first settlements in the St Neots area were located clear of areas where flooding might be expected. As the population expanded in medieval times, construction took place in vulnerable areas, resulting in flooding of dwellings. Efforts were made to train the waters, still resulting in flooding if the works were overcome. The worst floods in the nineteenth century were in 1908, 1916/17, 1933/34, and the great flood of 1947.

== Twentieth century wars ==
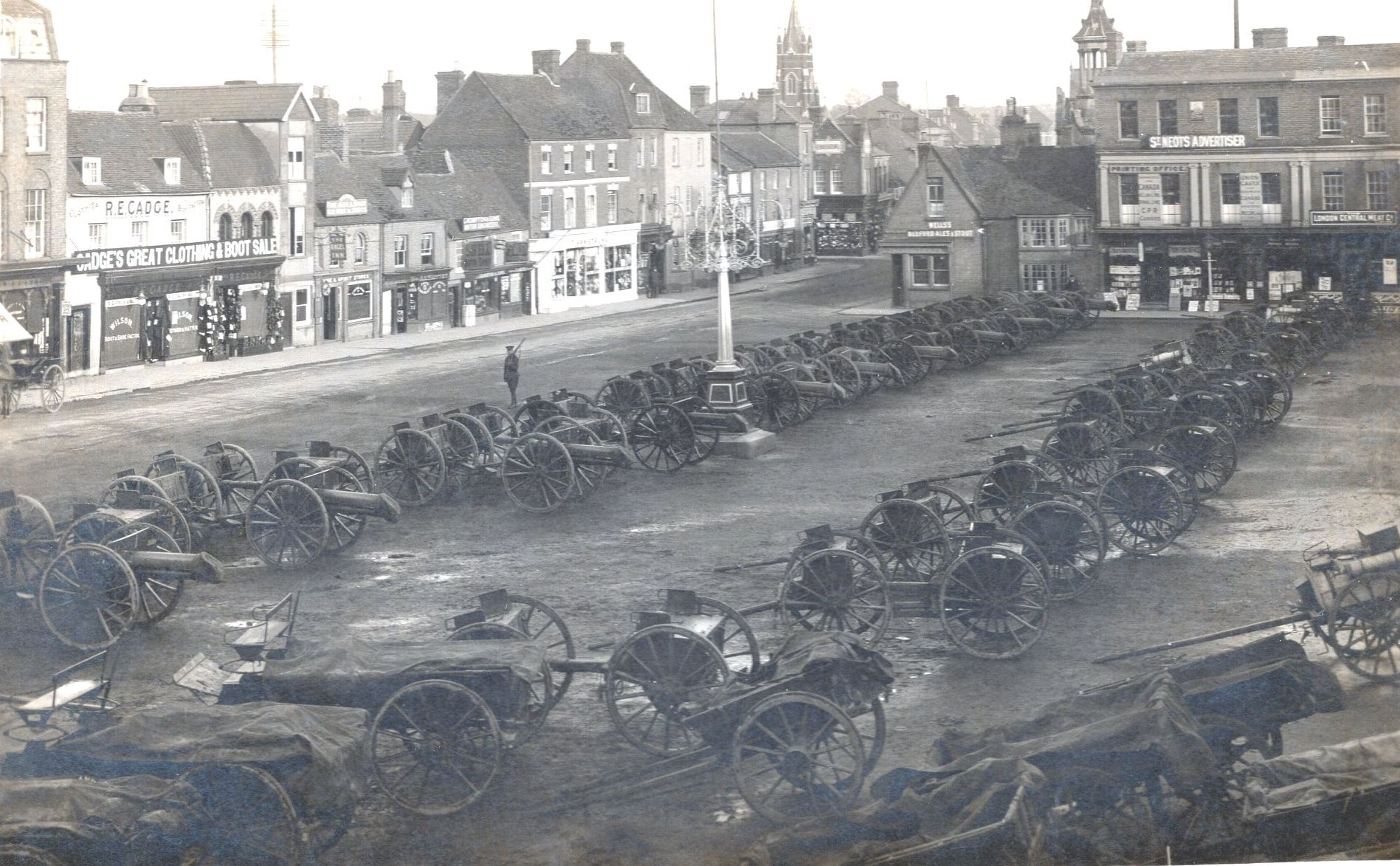
Artillery pieces of Highland Brigade Royal Field Artillery at St Neots 1915

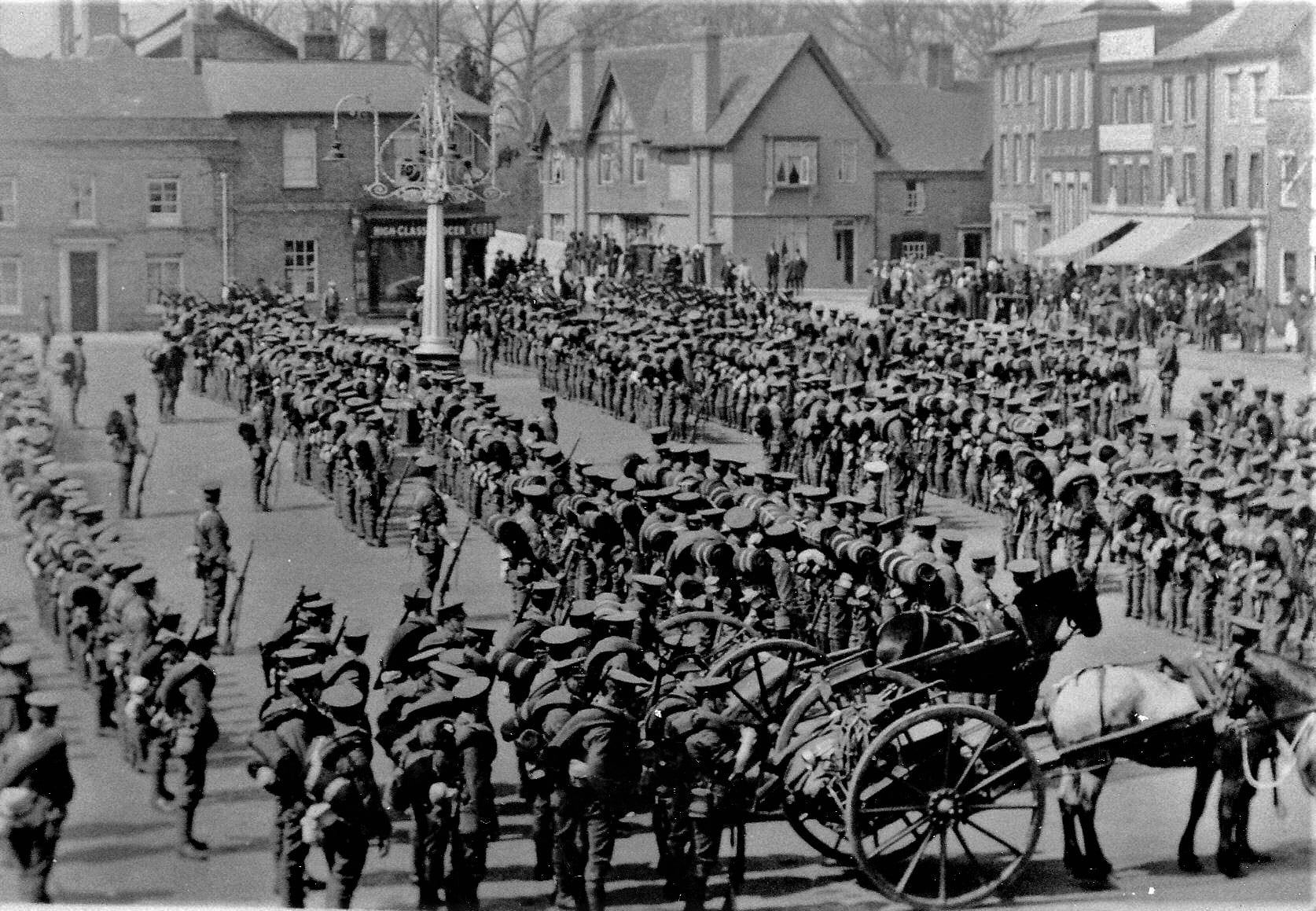
Infantrymen at St Neots, probably in 1915

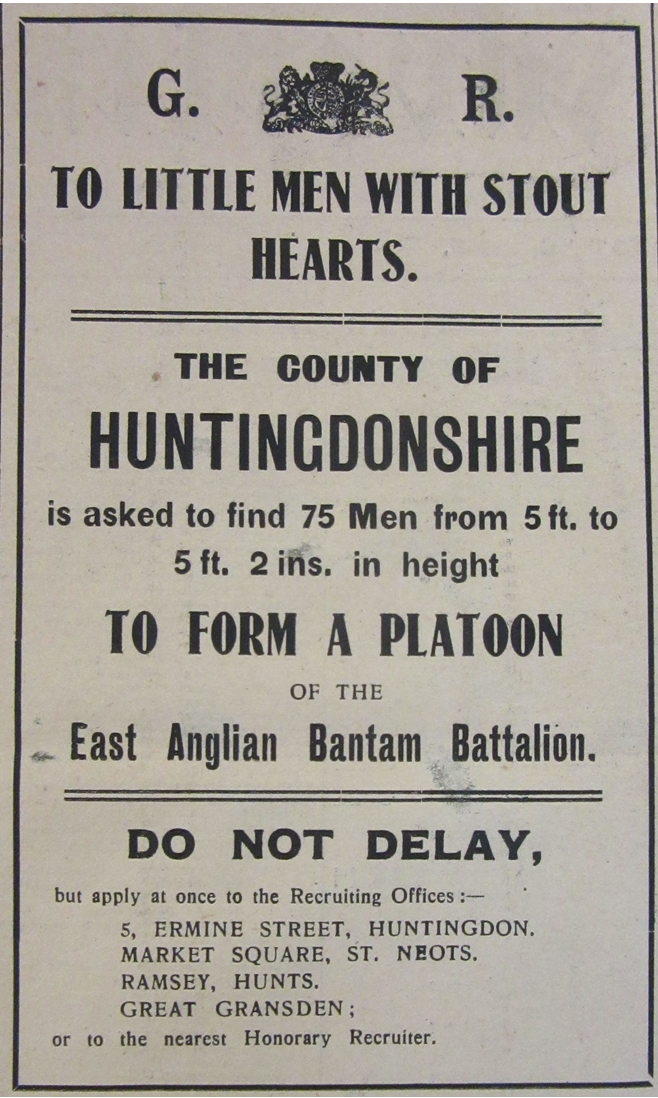
Recruiting poster for shorter men, 1916

=== World War I ===
World War I was declared on 4 August 1914. Towards the end of the month, the council was informed by the military authorities that soldiers were to be stationed in the town, and that the town water supply should be laid on to the areas where men and horses would be encamped. The Gun Park (now the site of the Priory Infants School) was made available for the troops, though it was soon realised that the army's heavy equipment needed a more solid and less muddy base. Consequently, from December 1915, all artillery and heavy wagons were kept on the Market Square.

The Highland Brigade Royal Field Artillery were stationed at St Neots from August 1914 to April 1915, prior to deployment to France. Three Highland Brigades were stationed at "Bedford", and it seems that either I Highland Brigade RFA(T) or II Highland Brigade RFA(T) were outbased in St Neots.

I Highland Brigade consisted of three batteries: 1, 2 and 3 Aberdeen Battery RFA(T). II Highland Brigade RFA(T) consisted of three batteries: Forfarshire Battery RFA(T), Fifeshire Battery RFA(T) and Dundee Battery RFA(T). Each battery was equipped with obsolete (Boer War era) 15-pounder field guns.

There was also III Highland Brigade RFA(T), with two batteries each with six howitzers, almost certainly not based in St Neots.

=== World War II ===
St Neots did not suffer any concerted bombing attack in World War II, although the numerous RAF stations in the surrounding area led to enemy bomber attention. An important issue was the reception of evacuated children. The primitive state of basic services is shown by the fact that as war became inevitable, it was urged that trenches should be dug to deal with the extra night soil. Three hundred children arrived two days before war was declared; they were all billeted in homes in Eynesbury. Well over 1,000 were billeted in 1940.

== Population growth ==
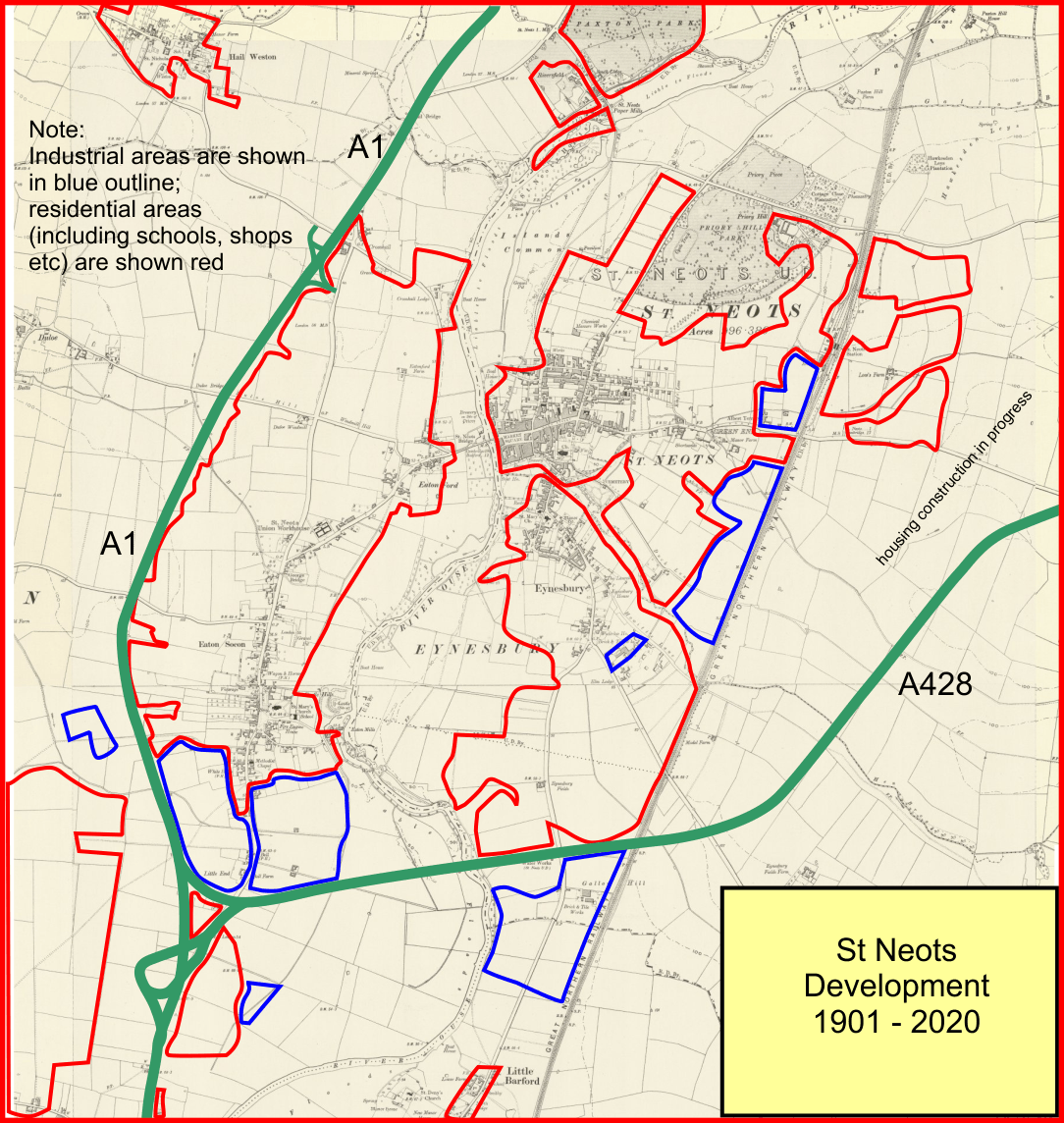
Growth of St Neots from 1901 to 2020

During the stagecoach era, Eaton Socon had rivalled St Neots in population terms:

- Census year 1801

Population growth
Census year	St Neots	Eaton Socon	Eynesbury
1801	1752	1625	575
1851	3157	2802	1233
1901	2789	2080	1091
1951	4700	3032	

Eynesbury had been incorporated into St Neots by the time of the 1951 census.

The Town Development Act of 1952 was aimed at reducing overcrowding in London, and it has led to the rapid growth of the towns of Huntingdon, St Ives and St Neots in recent years. The population of St Neots had risen to 21,660 in 1982.

== The twentieth century ==
=== The St Neots Quads ===
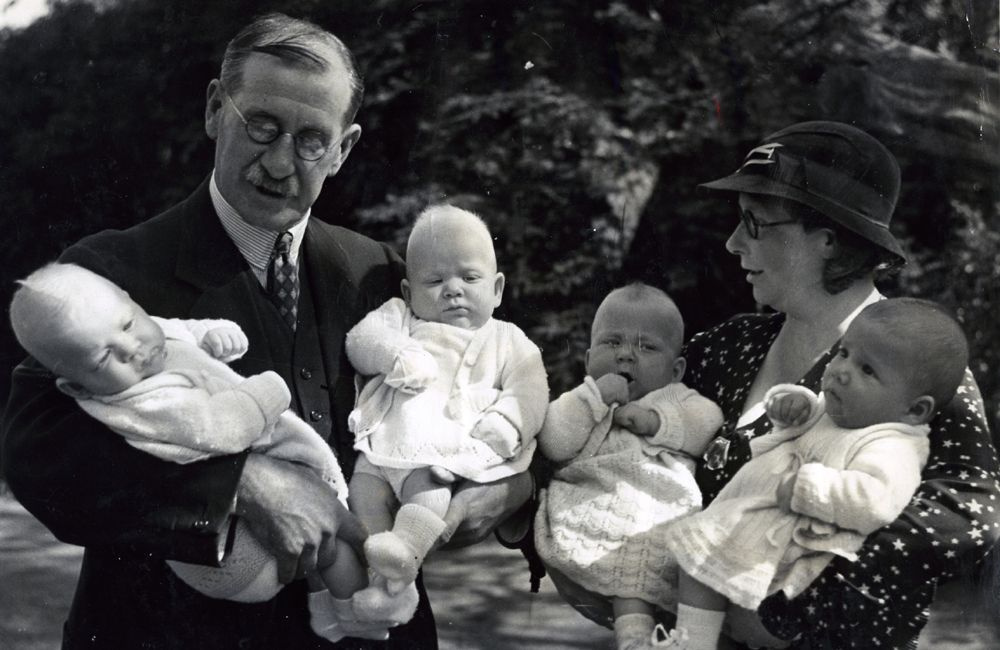
The Quads with Dr Harrisson and Mrs Miles

In 1935, quadruplets were born in St Neots to Mrs Doris Miles. This caused a media sensation, as they were the first British quadruplets to survive more than a few days. Careful attention was given to their early welfare, directed largely by the family doctor, Dr E H Harrisson, who made special arrangements to accommodate them. They were the subject of numerous press and newsreel reports following their progress. They are all alive today (May 2021).

=== Little Barford Power Station ===
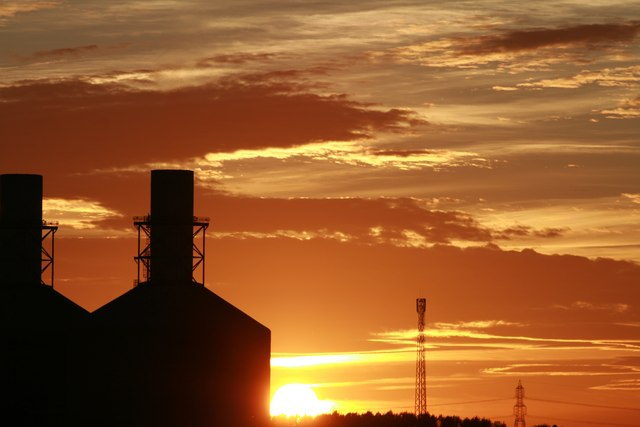
Little Barford Power Station

Little Barford A Power Station was commissioned in 1941; it had 126 MW capacity. It burnt pulverised coal, delivered by rail from the adjacent main line. Cooling water was taken from the River Ouse nearby, supplemented by a cooling tower. Little Barford B Power Station nearby was commissioned in 1959 with 127 MW capacity, also using pulverised coal fuel and with cooling towers. Decommissioning and demolition of both stations took place in 1989.

A gas fired station was commissioned on the same site in 1996. It is a Combined cycle power plant capable of an output of 256 MWe.

=== Loss of industry -- and revival ===
By the late 20th century, the de-industrialisation which characterised much of Britain affected St Neots with the loss of Courtaulds (formerly Kayser Bondor), Samuel Jones, Gates' Hydraulics and several others; Paine's Brewery was sold and closed. However, the developments associated with housing expansion also brought light and mid-scale industry to the town in modern industrial facilities.

Unemployment rates in Huntingdonshire are lower than the national average: 2.7% compared with an average for England of 4.1%. Full-time workers in Huntingdonshire earned a median weekly salary of £600 in 2018, compared to £575 across England.

== Recent history ==
St Neots has been designated for a considerable expansion of housing in the twenty-first century. As well as local in-fill sites, this involved the Loves Farm development in 2006. That development is currently (2021) being extended eastward, and the first stage of the Wintringham Estate, between Cambridge Street and the St Neots by-pass, has been constructed.
