= A428 road =

Road in England

A428

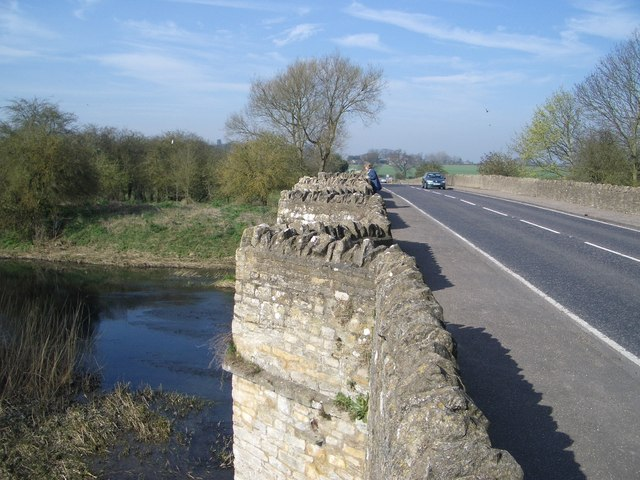
- The A428 bridge over the River Great Ouse at Turvey

Route information
- Length: 82.9 mi (133.4 km)

Major junctions
- Northwest end: Coventry; 52.4087°N 1.4925°W
- A4600 A444; A46 A4071 A426; A5; M1 A4500 A5080 A508 A5120 A4501; A45 A509 A422 A5141; A6 A5140 A421; A1 A1198 A1303; A14
- Southeast end: Cambridge; 52.2319°N 0.0779°E

Location
- Country: United Kingdom
- Primary destinations: Rugby; Northampton; Bedford; Cambridge; Coventry

Road network
- Roads in the United Kingdom; Motorways; A and B road zones
← A427	→ A429

The A428 road is a major road in central and eastern England. It runs between the cities of Coventry and Cambridge by way of the county towns of Northampton and Bedford. The A428 was formerly part of the main route from Birmingham to Felixstowe before the A14 was fully opened in 1993. As of January 2026, the eastern section of the A428 (A14/M11 at Cambridge to the A1 near St Neots) forms part of the route between Cambridge and Oxford via Milton Keynes: from spring 2027, this section is to be redesignated as the part of the A421 and the A428 will terminate at the A421 near Bedford.

== Route ==
=== Coventry–Northampton ===
The road starts on the A4600 Sky Blue Way in Coventry, heading eastbound out of the city and meeting the A444 and A4082 roads before crossing the A46 Eastern Bypass and into Warwickshire. The road then passes through the village of Binley Woods before becoming more rural in nature, meeting the Fosse Way and crossing the River Avon at Bretford. 3.8 miles (6.1 km) further along, the road enters Rugby where it meets the A4071 and A426 and passes Rugby School. It then continues out of the town to the east through the suburb of Hillmorton and crosses the A5 near Daventry International Rail Freight Terminal (DIRFT). It meets the M1 at its original terminus, junction 18, and bypasses the towns of Crick and West Haddon. The road passes the Althorp family estate, then enters Northampton.

=== Northampton–Cambridge ===
East of Northampton, the road passes Little Houghton, Brafield-on-the-Green and Yardley Hastings. After here it enters the City of Milton Keynes (and Buckinghamshire) where it meets the A509 at Warrington roundabout. Continuing towards Bedford, the road passes Lavendon and Cold Brayfield. Crossing the Great Ouse it enters Bedfordshire at Turvey, on to Bromham. It meets the A422 at a roundabout outside Bromham. The road bypasses Bromham and, leaving behind its former route east-bound through Bedford (which has become the A4280), swings southwards on a new alignment then, via a new bridge over the Great Ouse, merges with the A421 south of Kempston.

The A428 loses its identity here: the route continues as the A421 as it bypasses Bedford, Great Barford and Roxton and goes on to become the dual-carriageway A1 at the Black Cat roundabout. Heading north, the route leaves the A1 via a grade separated junction just south of St Neots and regains its identity. Crossed by the East Coast Main Line, it leaves Bedfordshire for Cambridgeshire. The A428 from here to Cambridge follows the former A45, which became the A428 when the A14 opened. It meets the A1198 (former A14) at Caxton Gibbet roundabout near Papworth Everard. From here the road is dual carriageway, bypassing the existing single carriageway section near Hardwick. The route terminates, merging into the A14 at Girton interchange, where traffic joins first from the M11 junction 14 and then from the trunk A14 road junction 31.

== Work in progress ==
=== A1–M11/A14 link ===
In the "Road investment strategy" announced to Parliament by the Department for Transport and Secretary of State for Transport on 1 December 2014, planning would begin to dual the section between the A1 (at Black Cat roundabout) and the A1198 (at Caxton Gibbet). The announcement said that the A1/A421 Black Cat roundabout would be replaced with a grade-separated junction, just a few years after this roundabout was expensively upgraded. The link would provide an uninterrupted dual carriageway route between the M1 (at Junction 13) and the M11/A14 (at Junction 14 and 31) near Cambridge.

On 18 February 2019, Highways England announced final route selection for the new road between Caxton Gibbet and the Black Cat junction (which will cease to be a roundabout and become a three-level GSJ).

In September 2019, geological survey work began on the route.

In March 2021, Highways England awarded contracts for construction of the Black Cat – Caxton Gibbet link.

In September 2021, National Highways (Note: rebranded from Highways England in August 2021) announced that this new section of dual carriageway will be designated A421, and the bypassed sections will be renumbered as A1428 and B1428. Construction began in December 2023. When the new road is completed ("spring 2027"), the A428 will be truncated to run between Coventry and Bedford.

== History ==
The section between Cambridge and the A1 was originally part of the A45.

=== Bypasses and realignments ===
- Crick (Bypassed, now unclassified)
- West Haddon (Bypassed, now unclassified)
- Little Houghton (Bypassed, now unclassified) (the 2-mile (3.2 km) £1.4 million bypass opened in December 1979)
- Bromham (the 2-mile (3.2 km) £4.8 million bypass opened in September 1986)
- Bedford – The first section of the Bedford Western Bypass opened December 2009. The route, 3.2 miles (5.1 km) in length, commences at the Bromham Bypass on the east side of the river for approximately 1 mile (1.6 km). It then passes southwards crossing the River Great Ouse flood plain and bypasses Kempston to meet the A421 (A1-M1 link). The original route through Bedford was reclassified as the A4280.
- St Neots bypass (opened in December 1985, originally designated as the A45. The former route through the town is now the B1428).
- Eltisley bypass (opened in 1972, originally designated as the A45).

=== Recent improvements ===
- Cambourne: Bypassed by a 1.2 miles (1.9 km) stretch of dual carriageway opened in May 2003.
- Caxton Gibbet: A two-lane £55 million dual carriageway section opened on 24 May 2007 after widening works started by the Highways Agency in August 2005, linking this point to a grade-separated junction at Hardwick (about 5 miles (8 km) further east).
