= Caxton Gibbet =

Small knoll in Cambridgeshire, England

Coordinates: 52°13′44″N 0°06′14″W

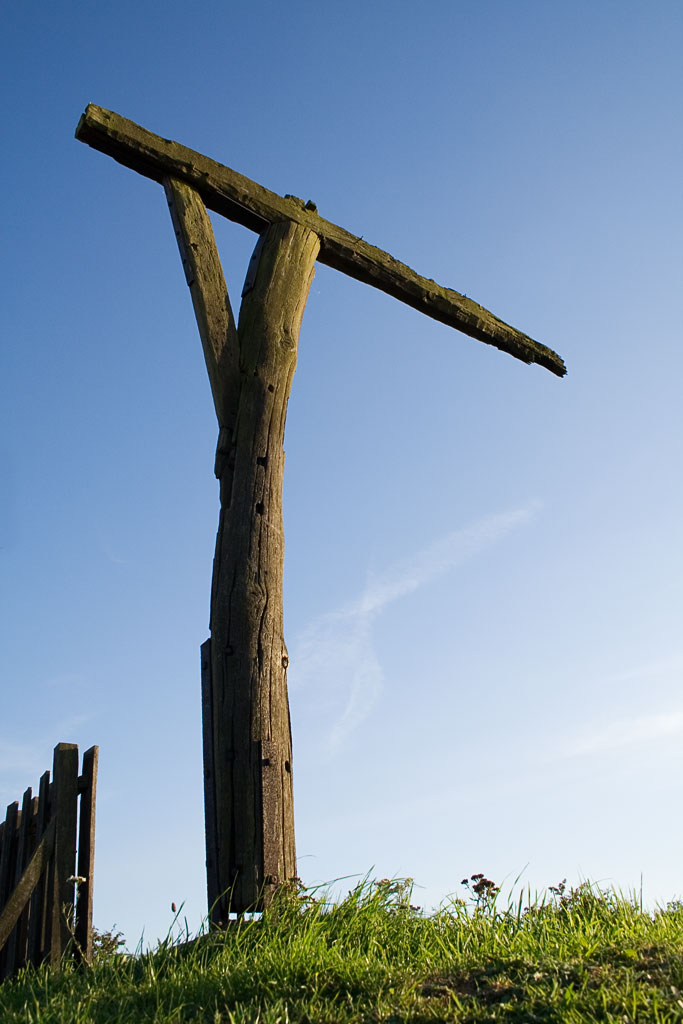
The reconstructed gallows at Caxton Gibbet

Caxton Gibbet is a small knoll on the Ermine Street Roman road (now the A1198) in England, running between London and Huntingdon, near its crossing with the road (now the A428) between St Neots and Cambridge.

== History ==
There are tales of murderers being hanged and displayed at the nearby village of Caxton in the 1670s, and records in a court case that the gibbet was still there in 1745. Several local writers say that it was no longer there by the early decades of the nineteenth century, but in January 1822, William Cobbett recorded seeing the gibbet in his "Huntingdon Journal" (published in his Political Register, vol. 41, no. 4, 26 January 1822), and in 1831 the Rev H. G. Watkins, whilst on a carriage tour of England, records passing, a mile from Caxton village, "a gibbet on the roadside with an inscription, Caxton Gibbet". There is a modern replica, which can be seen in photographs dating back to 1900.

It is reputed to be a gruesome example of the cage variation of the gibbet, into which live victims were allegedly placed until they died from starvation, dehydration or exposure. After execution, dead bodies were certainly suspended in cages as a warning, and this may have happened here. There are a number of folk tales reported on various websites and in secondary sources of people being hanged at Caxton, none of which can be verified from primary sources. The most gruesome concerns the murder of a man called Partridge, either by a poacher or a man who thought Partridge had killed his dog. The murderer, sometime after having escaped abroad for a period, boasted or was otherwise detected of the crime and ordered to be gibbeted alive. In some versions, a local baker who offered him bread suffered a similar fate. There is no contemporaneous record of anything that confirms any part of this story, either in court or in burial records. The practical difficulties of enforcing this penalty would be insuperable. There is little evidence of this practice anywhere in England.

Cambridgeshire County Record Office, which is part of Cambridgeshire Archives and Local Studies, says that the following entry in the manuscripts of William Cole, a Cambridgeshire antiquarian (1714–82), has been taken to refer to the Caxton Gibbet, although there is no more specific mention of the actual location in the text. He is clearly referring to a dead body.

About 1753 or 1754 the son of Mrs. Gatward being convicted of robbing the Mail was hanged in chains on the Great Road. I saw him hanging in a scarlet coat after he had hung 2 or 4 months; it is supposed that the screw was filed which supported him and that he fell in the first high wind after.

== Other nearby features ==
The erection of the modern replica may have been connected with the nearby public house The Gibbet Inn. The inn was a Paine and Co. pub and was later used as a Chinese restaurant, but has now been demolished.

The location gave its name to an RAF Relief Landing Ground, operated between summer 1940 and 9 July 1945, in the field to the east of Ermine Street. It was used by Tiger Moths of the 22 Elementary Flight Training School (Cambridge) and huts there were used to house personnel from 105 Squadron at RAF Bourn.

A milestone, south of the site of the Caxton Gibbet Inn, is Grade II listed.
