= A1198 road =

Road in Cambridgeshire, England

A1198

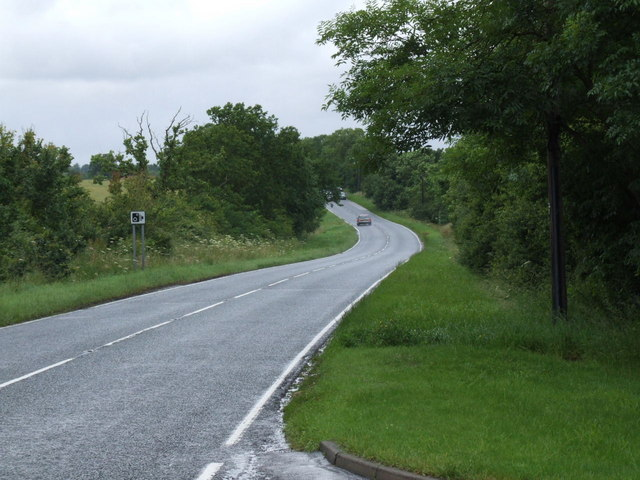
- A bend in the A1198 (Old Great North Road, Ermine Street).

Major junctions
- South end: A505 road near Royston
- A505 A603 A428; A14 A1307
- North end: Godmanchester, near Huntingdon

Location
- Country: United Kingdom
- Constituent country: England
- Primary destinations: Royston; Cambourne; Godmanchester

Road network
- Roads in the United Kingdom; Motorways; A and B road zones

The A1198 is a road in Cambridgeshire, England, which runs between the A505 at Royston, and the A1307 on the outskirts of Huntingdon.

== History ==
=== Roman Road ===
The road follows the route of Ermine Street between the A505 at Royston, Hertfordshire and Godmanchester, near Huntingdon.

=== 20th century ===
This road was designated as a major road during road classification in 1922, and originally carried the number A14. By 1991, most of the former A14 was renumbered as the A1198, with short section of the route from Huntingdon to Alconbury being renumbered as a spur of the A604.

=== 21st century ===
In August 2010, Cambridgeshire County Council announced the reduction of the road's speed limit from 60 mph to 50 mph in areas where concern was raised over the safety of traffic.
