= Transforming Infrastructure Performance =

Transforming Infrastructure Performance is a British government report on the UK construction industry issued by the Infrastructure and Projects Authority in December 2017. Its aim was to improve productivity in the sector and make savings of £15 billion per year. It proposed to do this by increasing innovations like off-site construction and new digital technology, improving government procurement procedures, and improving integration and collaboration. It was seen as a welcome initiative by the industry, and early implementation of its aims has been incorporated into the water industry's 2019 price review.

A follow-up report, Transforming Infrastructure Performance: Roadmap to 2030 was published on 13 September 2021 and, in combination with other documents, this report outlines UK government construction strategy through to 2030.

== Aims ==
The British construction industry has been in a period of stagnating productivity, and the Transforming Infrastructure Performance (TIP) report is seen as an opportunity to tackle this. Productivity in the rest of the UK economy has been improving at a greater rate than that in construction for some time. Research and development expenditure in that sector is reasonably high, but it has often been spent in an uncoordinated and unfocused way with poor returns. The existing business model of project-by-project transactional delivery has made cost the primary factor in determining the supply chain rather than a consideration of what is best for the project or client.

The TIP report was issued by the British government's Infrastructure and Projects Authority (IPA) in December 2017 and outlined three key aims for the ten years following publication:

- Ensuring investment is made in the "right" projects
- Improving the construction sector's productivity
- Maximising benefits of investment in infrastructure

These aims require improvements in the planning, procurement and delivery of projects. The report recognises that significant improvement has been made in long-term strategic planning since the 2015 establishment of the National Infrastructure Commission and the 2016 issue of the National Infrastructure Delivery Plan. This includes switching major infrastructure bodies such as Highways England, Network Rail, HS2 and the Environment Agency from annual budgets to multi-year spending plans. The government intends to save the industry £15 billion per year by implementing TIP. The programme was announced alongside details of new construction projects valued at £600 billion over the next 10 years.

== Proposed delivery ==
The IPA was given responsibility for delivering TIP with oversight by HM Treasury. Delivery would be supported by using the purchasing power of the government, implementing initiatives across all government departments and working closely with industry through the Construction Leadership Council, the Infrastructure Client Group and the Construction Industry Training Board.

Priorities for the first two years following the report are:

- Establishing benchmarking of current major project cost and performance in the UK, the G20 and the OECD
- Expanding use of the cross-sector integration approach pioneered on the Cambridge – Milton Keynes – Oxford corridor to other regional initiatives, such as the Northern Powerhouse, Midlands Engine and Thames Gateway
- Supporting the implementation of the Crown Commercial Service Procuring for Growth Balanced Scorecard
- Supporting a move to off-site construction methods as announced in the November 2017 United Kingdom budget
- Supporting implementation of the Construction Sector Deal to improve the level of innovation and skills in the industry
- Driving the implementation of digital technology in the sector, such as through the Digital Built Britain programme and the Infrastructure Industry Innovation Platform, to build on recent examples of good practice in this field, such as the Highways England Smart Motorways programme
- Focusing on the IPA's core role of advising ministers in planning and procurement of major projects, and refreshing the government's construction strategy in 2018

The IPA cautioned that the plan should not be seen as a means of driving down construction costs but rather that better whole life performance needed to be realised. A new benchmarking team will be established at the IPA to monitor the delivery of British infrastructure projects against global benchmarks.

The report cites the Institution of Civil Engineers' Project 13 as an example of how change can be driven in the industry. Project 13 seeks to alter the behaviour and processes of organisations to implement better assessment and incentivisation of productivity and to move from project-by-project delivery to more long-term and integrated approaches. One of its key aims is to improve collaboration in the industry.

One of the IPA's predecessor organisations, Infrastructure UK, launched a similar Infrastructure Cost Review in 2010, which achieved its aims of saving £3 billion in infrastructure spending by 2015. The TIP initiative has been linked to a rewrite of the government's construction strategy, the current version of which is the Government Construction Strategy: 2016–2020.

== Reception and implementation ==
There was a good reception for the report in the construction industry, though there was a desire for actual change to be implemented rather than for continual reviews and reports. Early adopters included Ofwat, which implemented direct procurement—tendering projects for its whole lifecycle, including finance, design, build and operation, rather than just construction—in its 2019 price review. An earlier scheme to have adopted this was Thames Water's £4.2 billion Thames Tideway Tunnel. Constructing Excellence, the sector-wide industry reform organisation, welcomed the report stating that it was a "positive step" for UK infrastructure and that improved collaboration would "achieve better performance through delivery, whole life asset performance and ultimately outcomes for customers".

Andrew Jones, Exchequer Secretary to the Treasury, said that the government would use its role as a client in 25% of all UK construction to implement the plan. He was keen that the industry reaps the benefits of off-site construction, which can reduce waste by 90% and speed up delivery by 60%. He cited examples of schools which could be completed in around 4 months, rather than in 12 months by traditional construction.

Deputy Chair of the National Infrastructure Commission Sir John Armitt welcomed the report and the potential for investment to be made on new High Speed 3 and Crossrail 2 railways. However, he stated that the government needed to provide a clearly defined strategy for the coming decades and not just for the short-term.

An editorial article in New Civil Engineer, the magazine of the Institution of Civil Engineers, stated that the industry needs to improve how it manages and releases data, particularly that related to productivity and risk assessment. It called for standardisation, transparency and better benchmarking of good performance to allow proper assessment against the TIP targets.

== Follow-up 'roadmap' ==
On 13 September 2021, a follow-up report, Transforming Infrastructure Performance: Roadmap to 2030, was published alongside the National Infrastructure and Construction Pipeline forecasting £650bn investment in UK infrastructure over the next decade. The Roadmap describes itself (p.9) as the successor to the Government Construction Strategy, alongside the December 2020 Construction Playbook and the National Infrastructure Strategy.
