= Oxbridge (disambiguation) =

Oxbridge is a portmanteau of the Universities of Oxford and Cambridge .

Oxbridge may also refer to:

== Places ==
- Oxbridge, Dorset
- Oxbridge, Stockton-on-Tees

== Schools ==
- Oxbridge Academy (South Africa)
- Oxbridge Academy, a private school located in West Palm Beach, Florida, United States

== Other uses ==
- Oxbridge Blues, a television series
- The route between Oxford and Cambridge
  - "Oxbridge Expressway" was sometimes used to refer to the proposed Oxford–Cambridge Expressway
  - "Oxbridge Line" is used to refer to the historic Varsity Line (1845–1967) or to East West Rail, its modern replacement (under construction).
- Oxbridge reject, a pejorative term
- William Oxbridge, English MP

== See also ==
- List of fictional Oxbridge colleges
- Oxbridge Arc: see Oxford–Cambridge Arc
- Uxbridge (disambiguation)
