= Sadie Morgan =

English architect, designer and founder of dRMM architecture practice

Sadie Anna Morgan OBE (born 28 February 1969) is an English designer. In 1995 she founded dRMM, the RIBA Stirling Prize winning architecture practice, with Alex de Rijke and Philip Marsh.

Morgan is the chair of the Independent Design Panel for High Speed Two (HS2) UK, and a board member of both the National Infrastructure Commission (NIC) UK and the Thames Estuary 2050 Growth Commission. She is one of the Mayor's Design Advocates for the Greater London Authority (GLA), a Non-Executive Director of the Major Projects Association, a Professor of Professional Practice at London University of Westminster, and a Fellow of the UK Royal Society for the Encouragement of Arts, Manufactures and Commerce. In 2019, she cofounded the Quality of Life Foundation.

The developer Dicle Guntas and Sadie Morgan launched a new initiative, Forefront, to activate underused urban spaces, transforming overlooked areas into vibrant, community-focused places in August 2025.

== Early life and education ==
Morgan grew up in Kent, England, in a cooperative community set up by her grandfather, a psychiatrist and progressive socialist. Morgan's father was an architect and her mother is a designer and design lecturer. She studied at Kingston Polytechnic between 1989 and 1991, and in 1993 completed an MA at the Royal College of Art, London, UK. In 2016 she was awarded an honorary doctorate from the London South Bank University.

== dRMM Architects ==
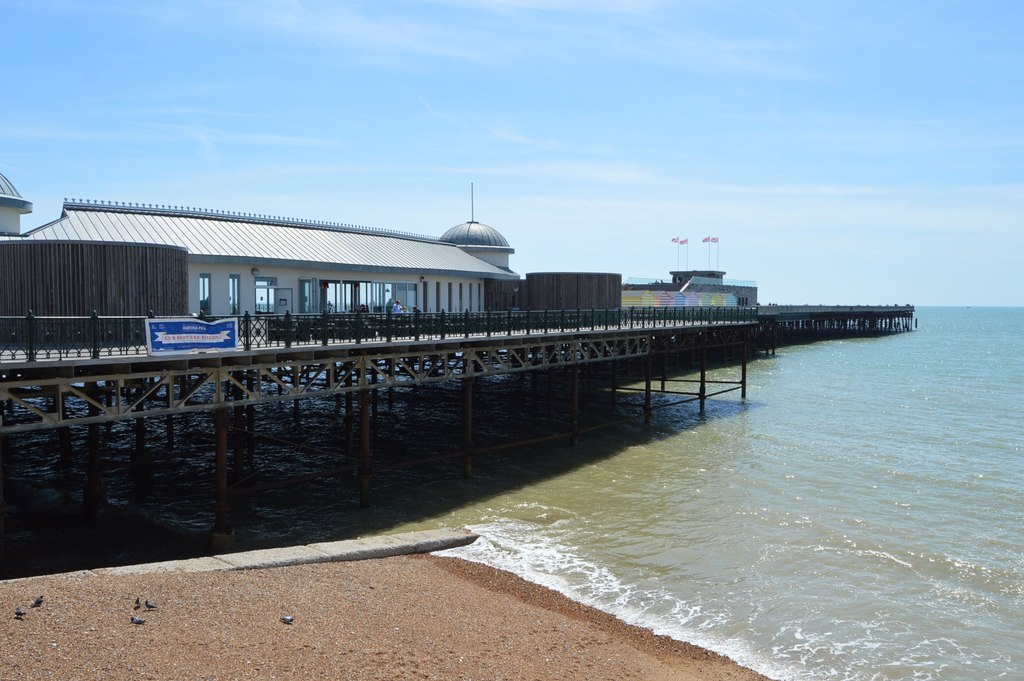
The redeveloped Hastings Pier, winner of the 2017 RIBA Stirling Prize

Morgan met Alex de Rijke and Philip Marsh during her studies at Kingston Polytechnic. In response to a competition to design a public education building for the London Docklands Development Corporation (LDDC), the three designers founded dRMM Architects in 1995. They won the competition and after a series of small-scale projects completed their first building – No. One Centaur Street – in 2003.

No. One Centaur Street, for which Morgan was design director, received praise from industry critics Jonathan Glancey and Barrie Evans, and won seven awards including the "RIBA London Building of the Year" and the "AJ First Building Award". In 2004 the studio won "Best New Architectural Firm", and in 2005 the "MIPIM Next Generation Award".

Other dRMM projects have included civic and educational buildings, such as the community-led Hastings Pier (winner of the 2017 RIBA Stirling Prize), Kingsdale School in Southwark, cancer care centre Maggie's Oldham and Clapham Manor Primary School (shortlisted for the 2010 RIBA Stirling Prize).

The practice has also undertaken residential projects, including individual dwellings such as the Sliding House and Woodblock House, and large-scale housing developments, including Trafalgar Place in Elephant & Castle (shortlisted for the 2016 RIBA Stirling Prize and winner of the Development of the Year Award at the 2016 British Home Awards), Faraday House at Battersea Power Station and Wick Lane in Hackney Wick.

The practice won the "BD Education Architect of the Year" in 2014, the overall "BD Architect of the Year Award" in 2014 and, most recently, the "BD Housing Architect of the Year" in 2015. As well as winning several National RIBA Awards, the practice has received the UK's top architecture award, the RIBA Stirling Prize, for which it received two further nominations.

In 2013, Morgan became the fourth female President of the Architectural Association School of Architecture (AA) and the youngest individual to hold the position. Prior to her Presidency, Morgan was Honorary Treasurer of the AA between 2009 and 2013.

To mark their 30 year anniversary in June 2025, Sadie Morgan stepped down as director of dRMM.

== Government advisor ==
In March 2015, the UK's Secretary of State for Transport appointed Morgan Design Chair for High Speed Two (HS2) to oversee the design of the £36 billion project and to ensure the HS2 Design Vision is adhered to throughout the lifespan of the project. Following her appointment, she recruited a group of approximately thirty design experts to form the HS2 Design Panel.

In October 2015, Chancellor George Osborne announced Morgan's inclusion on the government's National Infrastructure Commission (NIC), tasked with producing a report at the start of each five-year Parliament to offer recommendations for priority infrastructure projects. The budget for infrastructure projects in the UK up to 2020 has been set at £100 billion. Morgan's fellow commissioners include Lord Adonis (Chair), Sir John Armitt (Deputy Chair), Dame Kate Barker, Professor Tim Besley, Professor David Fisk, Andy Green, Dr Demis Hassabis, Julia Prescot and Bridget Rosewell.

In 2016, Morgan was made commissioner on the Thames Estuary 2050 Growth Commission and in 2017 became a Mayor's Design Advocate for the Greater London Authority.

in August 2019, Sadie Morgan was appointed a member of the Homes England board, a non-departmental public body that funds new affordable housing in England.

== Advocacy ==
Morgan co-founded dRMM at the age of 26 and has maintained a gender-balanced workforce within the studio since foundation.

In 2015 she joined the board of PedELLE, a cycling group specially created for women to network, and has cycled to promote the role of women in design and property, and to raise money for charity.

Through her government advisory roles, she advocates the importance of design that connects back to people and place, and in 2017 she joined a panel of built environment specialists to respond to the Mayor of London, Sadiq Khan, as he launched his Good Growth by Design vision for the future of London.

== Quality of Life Foundation ==
In 2019, Morgan co-founded with brother Matthew Morgan, the Quality of Life Foundation, a charity promoting healthier and more sustainable homes and neighbourhoods. Its Quality of Life Framework, developed with URBED, identifies six themes—Control, Health, Nature, Wonder, Movement and Belonging—as measures for better design and planning. Under her leadership the Foundation has expanded its board and influence across housing and infrastructure sectors, published guidance on community consultation, and advocated for post-occupancy feedback in housing design.

== Press and lectures ==
Morgan is a regular columnist for the Estates Gazette and Building magazine, she has written feature articles for the Financial Times, London Evening Standard, The Observer, New London Quarterly, and the Architects' Journal, and has appeared numerous times on BBC Radio 4. She has lectured at institutions including the Royal College of Art, Royal Institute of British Architects (RIBA), London Metropolitan University, Glasgow School of Art, the World Architecture Festival and Inside Festival. She was a member of the RIBA National Awards Advisory Panel from 2013 to 2016, and was an expert interviewee for the RIBA feature production entitled, The Role of the Architect. Morgan is an external examiner at the University of Westminster, London and the University of Kent.

Morgan is an Expert Assessor for the NLA New London Awards, she sits on the Advisory Board at the London South Bank University, and is a professor at the University of Westminster, London.

== Honours, awards and recognition ==
Morgan was shortlisted for the Architects' Journal's Woman Architect of the Year in 2014, and won a 2015 Confederation of British Industry (CBI) First Women Award in recognition of her twenty-year career and her contribution to the built environment. She is a Fellow of the Royal Society for the Encouragement of Arts, Manufactures and Commerce. In 2016 she was appointed Visiting Professor of Interior Architecture at the University of Westminster.

In 2016 she was awarded an honorary doctorate from the London South Bank University, was named one of Debrett's 500 most influential people in Britain and became the first woman to receive the Building Magazine Personality of the Year Award. In 2017 she received the New London Architecture (NLA) New Londoner of the Year Award for her work in championing design at the highest political level.

In 2019, Morgan was awarded the 'AJ100 Contribution to the Profession' award, as well as the inaugural 'Female Architectural Leader of the Year' award at the Building Design awards.

Morgan was appointed Officer of the Order of the British Empire (OBE) in the 2020 New Year Honours for services to the advocacy of design in the built environment.
