= Jim Hall (civil engineer) =

Professor of civil engineering (born 1968)

- Born: 6 May 1968 (age 58); Sidcup, England
- Known for: Infrastructure systems, water resource systems, adaptation to climate change, flood and coastal risk analysis
- Awards: Fellow of the Royal Society (2025) Prince Abdulaziz International Prize for Water (2018), Fellow of the Royal Academy of Engineering (2010), Institution of Civil Engineers' Robert Alfred Carr Prize (2004), Institution of Civil Engineers' George Stephenson Medal (2001), Institution of Civil Engineers' Frederick Palmer Prize (2001).

Academic background
- Education: University of Bristol

James Hall, FREng FRS is a British civil and environmental engineer. Professor of Climate and Environmental Risks in the Environmental Change Institute at the University of Oxford where he leads the Oxford Programme for Sustainable Infrastructure Systems. He is Senior Research Fellow at the Department of Engineering Science and Fellow of Linacre College. Hall is a member of the UK Prime Minister's Council for Science and Technology, a member of the Council of Expert Advisors the National Infrastructure and Service Transformation Authority and is President of the Institution of Civil Engineers for the year November 2024 to October 2025. He was appointed a Fellow of the Royal Academy of Engineering in 2010 and a Fellow of the Royal Society in 2025. He was a member of the Adaptation Sub-Committee of the UK Climate Change Committee from 2009 to 2019, and was chair of the Science and Advisory Committee of the International Institute for Applied Systems Analysis from 2020 to 2022.

== Career ==
Hall was born in Sidcup, England, and studied civil engineering at the University of Bristol, with a stage at the Ecole Nationale des Ponts et Chausses before graduating in 1990. He was a civil engineer with Taylor Woodrow Construction from 1987 to 1990 and then served with VSO in Guyana from 1991 to 1993 working on flood protection and drainage projects. He worked with water specialist HR Wallingford from 1993 to 1995 before returning to Bristol University to undertake a PhD in engineering systems and uncertainty analysis which he completed in 1999. He was awarded a Royal Academy of Engineering Post-doctoral Research Fellowship from 1999 to 2004 and became reader in civil engineering systems at the University of Bristol. In 2004, he was appointed as the inaugural Professor of Earth Systems Engineering at Newcastle University where he served until 2011. He represented Newcastle University as a member of the Tyndall Centre Consortium, leading the centre's cities research programme and became deputy director of the Tyndall Centre. He was appointed director of the Environmental Change Institute at Oxford University and was instrumental in the establishment of the Oxford Networks for the Environment (ONE) which bring together research in the University of Oxford on energy, climate, water, biodiversity and food. In 2018, he stood down as Director of the Environmental Change Institute.

== Research ==
He researches risk analysis and decision-making under uncertainty for water resource systems, flood and coastal risk management, infrastructure systems and adaptation to climate change.

Water Resources: Hall developed methods for planning water resources in the context of uncertain future climate changes. In 2018, Hall and his former doctoral student Edoardo Borgomeo were awarded the Prince Sultan Abdulaziz International Prize in the category of Water Management and Protection for developing a new risk-based framework to assess water security and plan water supply infrastructure in times of climate change.

His research has focused on the quantification of risks from water resource systems especially the risks of water shortages and harmful water quality for people and the environment. This has contributed to the concept and literature of water security although this approach has been criticised as reductionist. With Claudia Sadoff and David Grey he was co-chair of the Global water partnership/OECD Task Force on the Economics of Water Security and Sustainable Growth.

Hall's analysis of water risks in Britain provided evidence for the National Infrastructure Commission's 2018 report Preparing for a Drier Future, for the Environment Agency's National framework for Water Resources and for the UK water Regulators' Alliance for Progressing Infrastructure Development (RAPID). He was editor of the AGU journal Water Resources Research from 2017 to 2022.

Flood risk: Hall developed the flood risk analysis for the first National Flood Risk Assessment (NaFRA) in England and Wales. The same research now also underpins the Environment Agency's Long Term Investment Strategy. He also developed the framework for uncertainty analysis in appraisal of options for protecting London from flooding over the 21st century, as part of the Environment Agency's 2012 Thames Estuary 2100 project. He was coordinating lead author in the Government Office of Science and Technology's Foresight Future Flooding project and was a member of the Scientific Advisory Group for Emergencies (SAGE) for the 2014 floods emergency. He was advisor during the 2016 floods and the subsequent National Flood Resilience Review.

Hall has published two books on flooding: Flood Risk Management in Europe: Innovation in Policy and Practice and Applied Uncertainty in Flood Risk Management.

Coastal Change: With Mike Walkden, Hall developed the SCAPE model, which can predict coastal cliff erosion decades into the future. SCAPE has been used to predict the impacts of climate change for coastal towns and nuclear sites. He was part of the team that developed the Tyndall Coastal Simulator which models the response of the East Anglian coast to climate change. Hall conceived the CoastalME modelling environment for simulating decadal to centennial morphological changes. He led the Committee on Climate Change's 2018 report Managing the coast in a changing climate.

Climate Change: Hall's research on adaptation to climate change has focused on climate change risk assessment and decision-making under uncertainty. He was a contributing author to the Fourth Assessment Report of the Intergovernmental Panel on Climate Change which won a Nobel Peace Prize. He was an advisor to the Stern Review on the Economics of Climate Change and led the infrastructure background paper for the Global Commission on Adaptation. Between 2009 and 2019, Hall was a member of the UK Adaptation Committee which is part of the Independent Climate Change Committee established by the 2008 UK Climate Change Act.

He was chair of the Steering Group of the £18.7m UKRI UK Climate Resilience Programme and served on the Governance Board and the Peer Review Panel for he UK's national climate projections, UKCP 18.

Infrastructure Systems: Jim Hall founded the UK Infrastructure Transitions Research Consortium which received two research Programme Grants from the Engineering and Physical Science Research Council. Hall led the development of the National Infrastructure Systems Model (NISMOD) which simulates the behaviour and interactions between energy, transport, digital, water and waste systems. NISMOD was used for the National Needs Assessment led by Sir John Armitt and for the UK's first National Infrastructure Assessment.

Hall now chairs the £8 million Data and Analytics Facility for National Infrastructure (DAFNI) at the Rutherford Appleton Laboratory. His book The Future of National Infrastructure sets out the challenges of sustainable infrastructure in the 21st century and provides a template for assessing long-term policy, planning and investments. NISMOD has been taken up by the UN Office for Project Services (UNOPS) in pursuit of the Sustainable Development Goals and has been used to inform infrastructure planning in Curaçao, St Lucia and Ghana. Hall developed several methods for analysing risks to infrastructure networks and prioritising actions to enhance network resilience. The work was used as part of the National Infrastructure Commission's 2020 study of infrastructure resilience. The work has twice been recognised with the award of the Lloyd's Science Prize and it has been applied to the analysis of infrastructure network resilience in Tanzania, Vietnam, Argentina and China and at global scale.

Uncertainty and decision analysis: Hall applied generalised theories of probability to civil engineering and environmental systems, including random set theory, the theory of imprecise probability and info-gap theory. He applied the theory of imprecise probabilities to analyse tipping points in the Earth System.

== Mountaineering ==
Jim Hall has climbed new routes in Europe, North America, South America, the Himalayas and the Antarctic. He achieved the first ascent of South Face Thunder Mountain (Alaska) with Paul Ramsden and Nick Lewis, along with the first winter ascents of Cerro Poincenot, Aig Guillaumet, and Fitzroy Supercouloir (Patagonia), with Paul Ramsden, Nick Lewis, and Andy Kirkpatrick. These expeditions are recounted in Kirkpatrick's book Psychovertical.

== Honours ==
- Fellow of the Royal Society (2025).
- Prince Sultan Abdul Aziz International Prize for Water (2018).
- Fellow of the Royal Academy of Engineering (2010).
- Institution of Civil Engineers' Robert Alfred Carr Prize (2004).
- Institution of Civil Engineers' George Stephenson Medal (2001).
- Institution of Civil Engineers' Frederick Palmer Prize (2001).
