= Government Major Projects Portfolio =

UK government portfolio of large and complex projects

Agency overview
- Formed: 2011
- Jurisdiction: Government of the United Kingdom
- Headquarters: London, United Kingdom
- Parent agency: National Infrastructure and Service Transformation Authority / HM Treasury
- Website: www.gov.uk/government/collections/major-projects-data

The Government Major Projects Portfolio (GMPP) is a collection of the United Kingdom government's largest, most complex, expensive, or strategically significant projects and programmes. It includes infrastructure, defence, digital transformation, and major service-delivery initiatives. The portfolio exists to strengthen oversight, accountability, and transparency across the government's highest-risk and highest-value projects.

== History and governance ==
The GMPP originated with the creation of the Major Projects Authority (MPA) in 2010, a joint venture between the Cabinet Office and HM Treasury to improve major project delivery. In 2016, the MPA merged with Infrastructure UK to form the Infrastructure and Projects Authority (IPA).

In 2025, major project oversight responsibilities transitioned to the new National Infrastructure and Service Transformation Authority (NISTA). The portfolio continues to be administered jointly by HM Treasury and the Cabinet Office, with annual publication of data and assurance reports through the IPA and now NISTA.

Projects qualify for inclusion in the GMPP if they require HM Treasury approval, exceed departmental spending limits, involve primary legislation, or are considered novel, contentious, or high-risk.

== Scope and composition ==
As of the 2024–25 reporting cycle, the GMPP contained 213 live projects with a total whole-life cost estimated at £996 billion. Projects are grouped under categories such as:

- Infrastructure and construction
- Government transformation and service delivery
- Digital and ICT
- Military capability

Each project appoints a named Senior Responsible Owner (SRO) whose details are published as part of the transparency framework.

Project performance is monitored using a Delivery Confidence Assessment (Red–Amber–Green rating).

== Transparency and evaluation ==
The Infrastructure and Projects Authority publishes data on the GMPP annually through its Major Projects Data releases. These reports disclose project costs, delivery status, timescales, and performance indicators.

The Government Major Projects Evaluation Review assesses how departments evaluate outcomes and benefits from major projects. According to the 2023–24 review, about two-thirds of projects have evaluation plans in place, while roughly one-third have high-quality evaluation frameworks.

Oversight is supplemented by reports from the National Audit Office (NAO) and inquiries by parliamentary committees such as the Public Accounts Committee. These bodies examine governance, value for money, and lessons learned from major programmes.

== Challenges and criticism ==
The portfolio has faced criticism over persistent cost overruns, schedule delays, and inconsistent project performance. A significant proportion of projects have been assessed as Amber or Red in Delivery Confidence Assessments. Observers note that evaluation quality varies, and that cross-departmental coordination remains a challenge. The NAO has called for stronger governance and more consistent sharing of lessons learned.

== Notable projects ==
Notable projects within the GMPP have included:

- Crossrail
- The New Hospital Programme
- Major defence capability and digital transformation projects
- Large-scale education, health, and transport infrastructure investments.

Department-specific subsets of GMPP data are published by departments such as the Ministry of Defence and the Department for Education.

== Significance and future directions ==
The GMPP is central to the UK government's efforts to strengthen project delivery and ensure accountability for public investment. The transition to NISTA in 2025 represents a renewed focus on integrating infrastructure and service transformation. Future priorities include enhanced evaluation, transparency, and cross-government collaboration to improve delivery confidence and value for money.

== See also ==
- National Infrastructure and Service Transformation Authority
- Infrastructure and Projects Authority
- All-Party Parliamentary Group for Project Delivery
- HM Treasury
- Public Accounts Committee (United Kingdom)
- National Audit Office
