= Infrastructure Client Group =

The Infrastructure Client Group (ICG) brings together UK economic infrastructure clients in partnership with government and industry. Its key purpose is to lead the acceleration of the improvement and alignment in the delivery and development of UK infrastructure for the benefit of the economy, society and the environment. The ICG contributes to a people-focused, system-based view of infrastructure by: benchmarking, sharing and adopting best practice in the development and delivery of infrastructure programmes and projects, and providing a single route to and from government and industry on behalf of economic infrastructure clients.

== History ==
The Infrastructure Client Group (ICG) was founded in 2010 to support the implementation of the British government's 2010 Infrastructure Cost Review which highlighted an opportunity to make efficiency savings of 15% in infrastructure procurement by 2015. It was originally supported by the Infrastructure and Projects Authority (formally Infrastructure UK). In 2022, it has 20 members, including Government arm's-length bodies, from across transport, energy, water, nuclear and broadband. The founding chairman from 2010 to 2014 was Simon Kirby, who is currently a senior advisor at PwC. The chairman from 2014 to 2018 was Andy Mitchell, CEO of Bazalgette Tunnel Limited, delivering the Thames Tideway Scheme. Dale Evans, formerly managing director of Anglian Water's @one Alliance, was chair from 2018 to 2020, and then took over as chair of Project 13. Secretariat services are provided by the Institution of Civil Engineers.

== Programme ==
In 2019, there was a strategic review which led to the current programme of the ICG, which focuses on the areas where clients can have the biggest transformational impact: Project 13 - a new Enterprise delivery model for infrastructure, Digital Transformation, Infrastructure Carbon, Productivity and People. These reflect the themes of the Infrastructure and Projects Authority Transforming Infrastructure Performance, the cross-government change programme, in partnership with departments, industry and academia, launched in 2021. As part of its Digital Transformation workstream, ICG has worked with Mott MacDonald since 2018, to produce a Digital Maturity Benchmarking Report using the Smart Infrastructure Index, and in 2021 piloting the Augmented Delivery Index. In early 2020 the ICG was asked by the Construction Leadership Council to lead the Infrastructure Industry Working Group to assist with the implementation of the CLC Roadmap to Recovery.

== Project 13 ==
In May 2018 the ICG launched Project 13, a global industry-wide change initiative which aims to improve the way high-performing infrastructure is delivered and managed. It identified that the transactional model for delivering major infrastructure projects and programmes is broken. It prevents efficient delivery, prohibits innovation and therefore fails to provide the high-performing infrastructure networks that businesses and the public require. It advocates the shift to an enterprise delivery model for infrastructure delivery. An Enterprise brings together owners, partners, advisers and suppliers, working in more integrated and collaborative arrangements, underpinned by long-term relationships. Participating organisations are incentivised to deliver better outcomes.

Project 13 is defined by five Pillars and a set of Principles. The Project 13 framework summarises the five Pillars, the core Principles provide a simple maturity matrix, illustrating the journey to a high performing Enterprise. The five Project 13 pillars are: Capable Owner, Governance, Integration, Organisation and Digital Transformation. In 2022, 14 projects and programmes were putting the Project 13 Principles into practice. The Adopter Community meets regularly to share its learning. In March 2021, ICG launched the Project 13 Network, a web-enabled community established to foster connections and collaboration across practitioners interested in delivering Infrastructure differently and putting the Project 13 Principles into practice. Project 13 is a flagship initiative of the World Economic Forum.
