= Oxford–Cambridge line =

The term Oxford–Cambridge line has more than one meaning

- The Varsity Line (1845 to 1967) describes the original railway line between Oxford and Cambridge;
- East West Rail is the proposed new line between these two cities.
  - Oxford–Bicester line is to become the western section of East West Rail
  - Marston Vale line (Bletchley–Bedford) is a remnant of the Varsity Line that is to be repurposed for East West Rail

== See also ==
- Oxford to Cambridge Expressway, a proposed roadway.
