= All-Party Parliamentary Group for Project Delivery =

Cross-party UK parliamentary group focused on improving project delivery

- Abbreviation: APPG for Project Delivery
- Formation: February 2025
- Type: All-Party Parliamentary Group
- Headquarters: Palace of Westminster, London, United Kingdom
- Chair: Henry Tufnell MP
- Parent organization: Parliament of the United Kingdom
- Website: www.appgprojectdelivery.org

The All-Party Parliamentary Group for Project Delivery (APPG for Project Delivery) is a cross-party group within the Parliament of the United Kingdom established to improve the delivery of major national projects and infrastructure, and to promote best practice in project management across government and industry.

== History and establishment ==
The group was launched in February 2025, with its inaugural meeting held in the UK Parliament. It was convened with the support of the Association for Project Management (APM), which acts as the group's secretariat. The APPG's Chair is Henry Tufnell, with cross-party representation from both the House of Commons and House of Lords.

One of the group's first activities was launching a public “call for evidence” inquiry on improving the delivery of national infrastructure projects.

== Purpose and activities ==
The APPG for Project Delivery provides a forum for parliamentarians, practitioners, industry representatives, academics and civil servants to discuss challenges in project delivery.

Its stated aims include:

- Promoting the adoption of project management best practices across government programmes.
- Ensuring the UK has the skills, policies and people required to deliver major projects that drive economic growth and innovation.
- Producing reports and policy recommendations addressing delivery challenges, governance, collaboration and technology.
- Engaging stakeholders through inquiries, hearings and workshops.

== Governance and membership ==
As with other All-Party Parliamentary Groups, the APPG for Project Delivery is informal and has no official parliamentary status. Its secretariat is provided by the Association for Project Management, with support from policy consultancy Tendo Consulting.

Membership includes MPs and peers from multiple political parties. The chair is Henry Tufnell MP.

== Key outputs and initiatives ==
- In March 2025, the APPG launched an inquiry into national infrastructure project delivery, inviting written submissions from stakeholders. Its terms of reference focused on delivery barriers, international lessons, skills and digital innovation.
- In June 2025, the APPG issued a response to the UK Government's 10-Year Infrastructure Strategy, highlighting the need for delivery capability and supporting the creation of the National Infrastructure and Service Transformation Authority (NISTA).

== Significance ==
The APPG for Project Delivery represents a dedicated parliamentary forum on the performance of major projects in the UK, connecting legislators with industry and academic expertise. It contributes to the policy debate on efficiency, governance and innovation in project delivery across the public sector.

== See also ==
- All-Party Parliamentary Group
- Association for Project Management
- National Infrastructure and Service Transformation Authority
- Government Major Projects Portfolio
