= Oxbridge line =

Oxbridge line has more than one possible meaning:

- The Varsity line, the historic railway line between Oxford and Cambridge, that was in use between 1845 and 1967.
- East West Rail, a current project to re-establish a line between the two cities (and beyond), partly on the same route.

== See also ==
- Oxford to Cambridge Expressway, a proposed roadway.
