= Infrastructure Cost Review =

The Infrastructure Cost Review was a 2010 report commissioned by the government of the United Kingdom and written by Infrastructure UK to find efficiency savings in the delivery of infrastructure projects. The British government aimed to make savings of up to £3 billion per year on current expenditure by 2015, primarily in the pre-construction phase. The report made a series of recommendations for changes in government procurement and planning. Cost savings were quickly realised and Infrastructure UK reported savings of £1.5 billion at the end of the first reporting year and £3 billion by 2014. The programme was projected to have saved £50 billion in expenditure by the end of the 2010s. Infrastructure UK was absorbed into the Infrastructure and Projects Authority which launched its Transforming Infrastructure Performance in 2017 which aims to make £15 billion in annual savings.

== Background ==
The incoming Conservative-Liberal Democrat coalition government made a commitment in the June 2010 United Kingdom budget (dubbed an "emergency budget") to launch an investigation into how to reduce the cost of major infrastructures and to report back by the end of the year. The report was issued in December 2010. The government had committed to spending £200 billion on infrastructure projects over the following five-year period.

== Findings ==
The report showed that no single factor was driving excessive costs but rather a combination of factors, they were mainly incurred during the pre-construction phases:

- Stop-start investment with a poor pipeline of guaranteed future works
- Lack of clarity in planning and design decisions with projects often starting before design is complete
- The perception that the contingency budget forms part of the overall budget and is available to spend
- Over-specification and use of bespoke designed solutions rather than off-the-shelf products
- Overly complicated bidding procedures
- Lack of strategic thinking by the supply chain
- Lack of investment in skills and training

The report showed that increasing fragmentation of the construction industry and a shift towards greater use of sub-contracting had also led to cost increases. The report writers considered that there was an opportunity to make savings of around 15% in infrastructure spending (£2-3 billion per year).

== Objectives ==
The report set five objectives in an attempt to improve cost efficiency:

- Publish a National Infrastructure Plan to provide forward visibility of work and continuity of investment
- Provide for clear ownership of responsibility for key decisions in public sector management of projects
- Allow for increased challenges to specifications and cost estimates, rather than accepting them upon submission
- Allow procurement options to vary depending on the risk profile of the client
- Allow for cost savings and value engineering for projects to be proposed by the industry

== Reviews ==
The benchmarking process began in March 2011. At the time of the one-year review in March 2012 Infrastructure UK estimated that their measures had already saved £1.5 billion. This included a 20% saving on 20 major projects being delivered by the Highways Agency and £400 million saved on London Underground works. Commercial Secretary to the Treasury Lord Sassoon said: "Every pound saved through this Cost Review programme is a pound more that can be spent on new infrastructure for the UK". In 2013 Infrastructure UK claimed in a year which saw significant infrastructure projects being developed such as HS2 and the Thames Tideway Tunnel. An estimated 25% saving was made on Highways Agency and Environment Agency projects, 4.9% savings on the Network Rail renewals programme and more than £1 billion on HS2 phase 1. The progress towards more collaborative behaviours was more notable in the rail, highways and water sectors than in energy, waste and telecoms.

The final review period ending in 2014 showed annual savings on infrastructure spending and reached the target of £3 billion. Infrastructure UK estimated that the efficiencies achieved as a result of the report would save the taxpayer more than £50 billion in the following decade. Commercial Secretary to the Treasury, Lord Deighton stated that "The Infrastructure Cost Review programme has helped to establish a refreshed relationship and more open dialogue between government and industry. This has been a success for the third year running. However, we cannot be complacent. As the economy recovers, we will redouble our efforts to ensure that we have the necessary skills, capacity and innovation to embed cost and efficient delivery".

The programme concluded in 2014 and Infrastructure UK was amalgamated with the Major Projects Authority in 2016 to form the Infrastructure and Projects Authority (IPA). The IPA launched the Transforming Infrastructure Performance report in 2015 aimed at saving £15 billion annually in the industry.
