= Tony Meggs =

Anthony Jan Michael Meggs CB is a British petroleum industry executive and former civil servant; the chairman of Crossrail, and the former chief executive of the Infrastructure and Projects Authority, jointly part of the Treasury and the Cabinet Office.

Meggs worked at BP in a number of roles, eventually as head of technology until leaving in 2008, after which he worked for companies including Talisman Energy, and co-chaired an MIT study on the future of natural gas.

Meggs was appointed as chief executive of the Major Projects Authority in the Cabinet Office in mid-2015, before his organisation was merged with the Treasury's Infrastructure UK body to form the Infrastructure and Projects Authority from 1 January 2016. As of September 2015, Meggs was paid a salary of between £190,000 and £194,999, making him one of the 328 most highly paid people in the British public sector at that time. He left the IPA in January 2019 to become chairman of Crossrail when that project ran into difficulties, replacing Sir Terry Morgan. He was succeeded at the IPA by Matthew Vickerstaff on an interim basis, and by Nick Smallwood in July 2019.

Meggs was appointed Companion of the Order of the Bath (CB) in the 2019 Birthday Honours.

Political offices
Preceded by David Blackall	Chief Executive, Major Projects Authority; 2015–2016	Succeeded by Himself as Chief Executive, Infrastructure and Projects Authority
Preceded by Himself as Chief Executive, Major Projects Authority	Chief Executive, Infrastructure and Projects Authority; 2016–2019	Succeeded by Nick Smallwood
Preceded by Geoffrey Spence as Chief Executive, Infrastructure UK	Chief Executive, Infrastructure and Projects Authority; 2016–2019	Succeeded by Nick Smallwood
Preceded by Sir Terry Morgan	Chairman, Crossrail; 2019–	Incumbent
