= Data and Analytics Facility for National Infrastructure =

UK Government infrastructure computing platform

The Data and Analytics Facility for National Infrastructure (DAFNI) is a computing platform which supports advanced research into national infrastructure including transport, water, energy and city-scale modelling. DAFNI was established in 2017 and spent four years in development before launching in July 2021. It brings together data, computing resources and expertise to support UK infrastructure research. It provides software allowing researchers to study complex infrastructure systems in cities, such as sewage systems or transportation networks. The DAFNI Annual Conference is addressed by experts in these disciplines.

The chair of the DAFNI Strategy Board is Jim Hall. He is Professor of Environmental Risks in the School of Geography and the Environment at the University of Oxford, a senior research fellow in the Department of Engineering Science at the University of Oxford and Fellow of Linacre College.

== History ==
In 2017, development began on DAFNI at the Rutherford Appleton Laboratory in Didcot, with £8 million in UKRI/EPSRC funding. The platform was intended to support government and industry by modelling infrastructure systems such as transport, energy, water, and communications. Led by Jim Hall, the project's first application was NISMOD (National Infrastructure Systems MODel), a modelling tool also used by the National Infrastructure Commission. A consultation was launched to assess user needs and address data access and security concerns.

In 2019, Chancellor Philip Hammond identified DAFNI as an example of how advanced computing could support improvements in the resilience of UK infrastructure. Developed over four years by the Science and Technology Facilities Council, the platform integrates data from multiple sources to model infrastructure systems using advanced visualisation tools. Hammond referenced DAFNI in commissioning a national study on infrastructure resilience, describing it as an opportunity to conduct "stress tests" of infrastructure networks and support evidence-based government decision-making.

In 2023, UK Research and Innovation launched a £4 million virtual Centre of Excellence for Resilient Infrastructure Analysis, which uses the DAFNI platform. The initiative supports research into the resilience of UK infrastructure against threats such as climate change and pandemics. DAFNI's data-sharing and modeling capabilities were cited as central to enabling collaboration between government, town planners, and researchers across the UK.

== Funding and Partners ==
From 2017 to 2021, DAFNI was funded by an UKRI EPSRC £8m investment in the UK Collaboratorium for Research on Infrastructure and Cities (UKCRIC) to provide infrastructure systems research capabilities. Since then, the DAFNI programme has received a £1.4m grant under EPSRC's Resource Only Strategic Equipment and in March 2023 UKRI awarded £4m to STFC Scientific Computing to establish a national Centre of Excellence for Resilient Infrastructure Analysis based on the DAFNI platform. Further UK Government funding was received in 2024.

Institutions working with DAFNI include Imperial, University of Bristol, Cranfield University, UCL CASA, Newcastle University and University of Southampton.
