= Uxbridge Township =

Uxbridge Township may refer to one of the following places:

In Canada

- Uxbridge Township, Ontario County, Ontario

In the United States

- Uxbridge Township, Barnes County, North Dakota

See also

- Uxbridge (disambiguation)
