= Tim Broyd =

English civil engineer

Tim Broyd is an English civil engineer who was elected the 152nd President of the Institution of Civil Engineers, taking office in November 2016.

== Early career ==
Broyd was born in Carshalton in Surrey, grew up in Wallington and Addington and went to Trinity School, in Shirley. After leaving Trinity School, he went to the University of Birmingham to study science and civil engineering, completing a PhD in 1979.

== Professional career ==
He then began employment at design, engineering and project management consultancy Atkins in Epsom, where he stayed for 20 years, including spells as chief engineer and group research and innovation director. During the early 2000s (2002-2007) he was chief executive at the Construction Industry Research Information Association (CIRIA), before joining the Halcrow Group (later CH2M), where he was group technology, innovation and sustainability director until 2012.

Broyd's interests include digital engineering and infrastructure resilience.

Broyd is now Professor of Built Environment Foresight and Honorary Professor of Civil Engineering at The Bartlett, University College London. He is also a Fellow of the Royal Academy of Engineering and the ICE, a Vice Chairman of the Construction Industry Council and a director of BuildingSMART (UK) Ltd and CEEQUAL Limited.

He was formally elected as the President of the ICE in December 2015, succeeding Sir John Armitt in November 2016.

== Family life ==
He married his wife Ros at St Mary's Church in Addington in 1978, and has lived in Warlingham since the 1990s. He has three children: Edwin, Aidan and Imogen.

Professional and academic associations
Preceded by John Armitt	President of the Institution of Civil Engineers; November 2016 – November 2017	Succeeded by Robert Mair, Baron Mair
