= Hastings Pier =

Pier in Hastings, England

Coordinates: 50.852202°N 0.572645°E

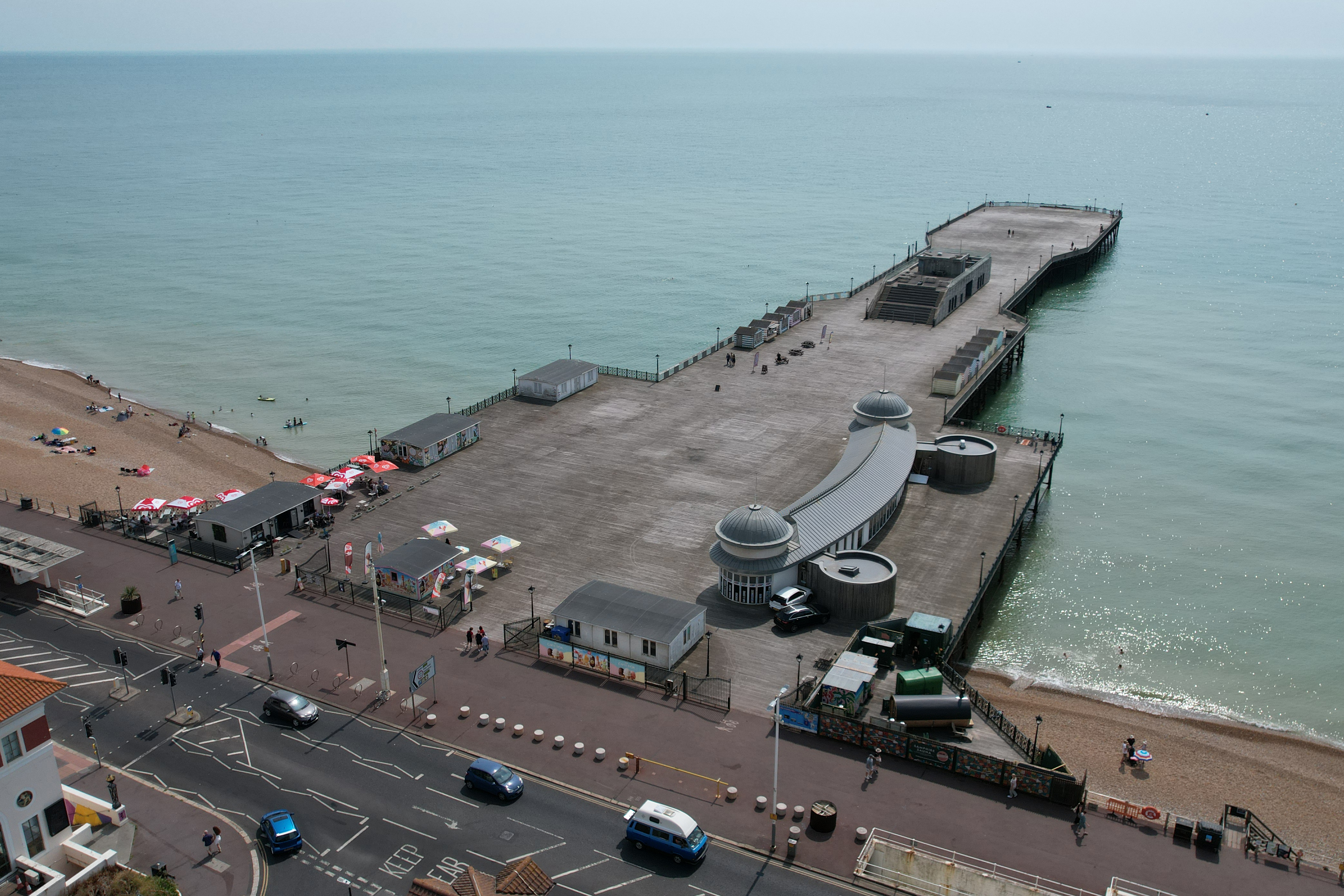
- Hastings Pier as of August 2026
- Type: Pleasure Pier
- Location: Hastings, East Sussex
- Owner: Abid Gulzar
- Website: hastingspier.org.uk

Characteristics
- Total length: 910 feet (280 m)
- Width: 45 feet (14 m) to 190 feet (58 m)

History
- Designer: Eugenius Birch; Redevelopment by dRMM
- Opening date: 5 August 1872

Hastings Pier is a public pleasure pier in Hastings, East Sussex, England. Built in 1872 and enjoying its prime in the 1930s, it became a popular music venue in the 1960s. The structure suffered major storm damage in 1990, and was closed to the public for a time before closing completely in 2008, and 95% destroyed by a fire in 2010. Hastings Pier Charity oversaw a rebuilding project, with the pier reopening on 27 April 2016. The redeveloped pier won the 2017 Stirling Prize for architecture.

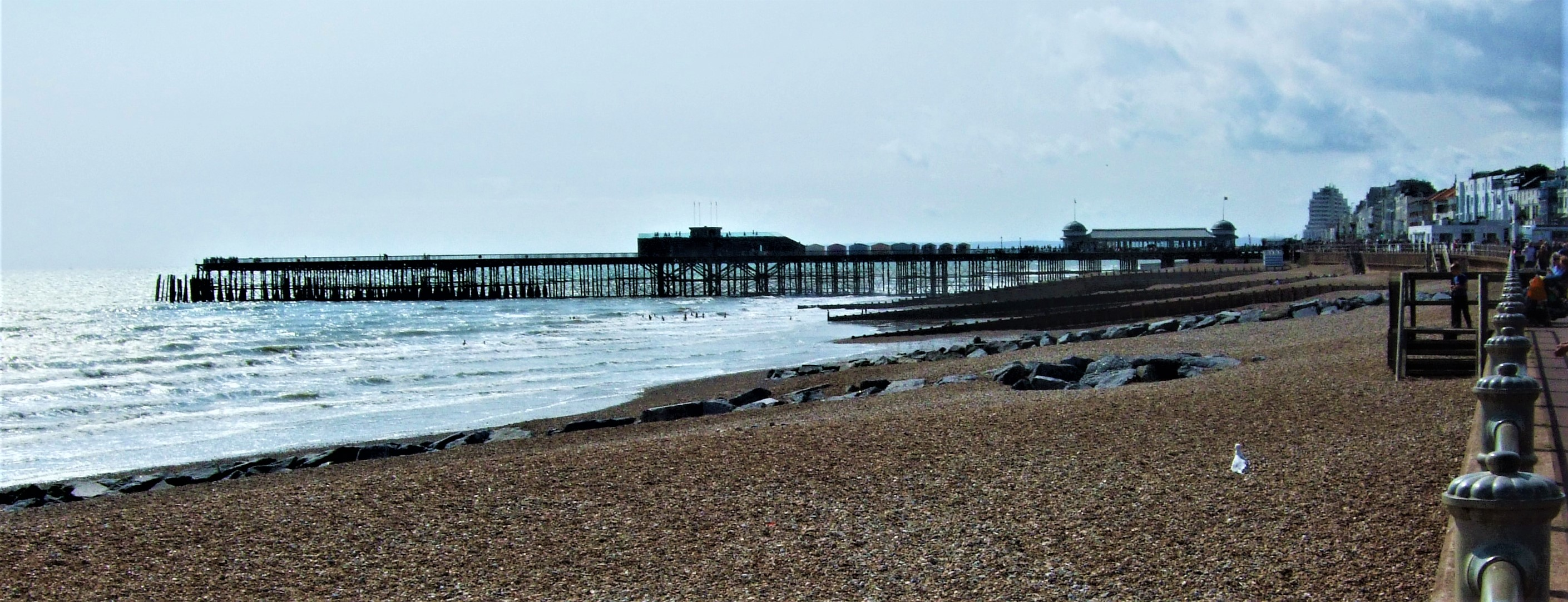
Hastings Pier after the 2016 redevelopment

The charity went into administration in 2017 and the pier was sold to a private buyer in 2018. The pier re-opened on 1 April 2019.

== History ==
Hastings Pier Act 1867
- Act of Parliament
- Parliament of the United Kingdom
- Long title: An Act for the Construction of a Pier at Hastings in the County of Sussex; and for other Purposes.
- Citation: 30 & 31 Vict. c. clxxxvii

Dates
- Royal assent: 12 August 1867
Other legislation
Repealed by	Hastings Pier Act 1985

Status: Repealed

Text of statute as originally enacted

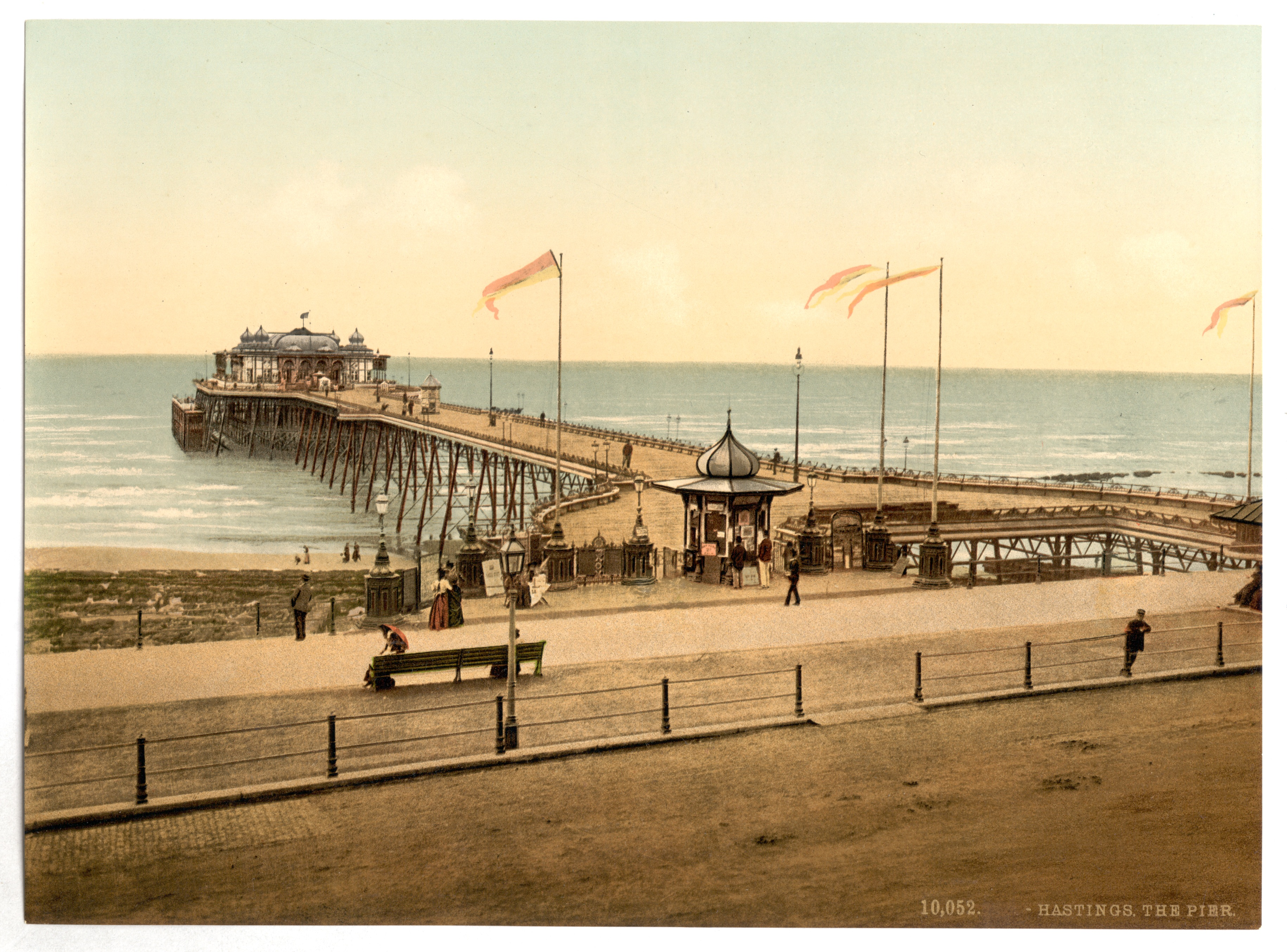
An early view of the pier

Hastings Pier Act 1937
- Act of Parliament
- Parliament of the United Kingdom
- Long title: An Act to authorise the Hastings Pier Company to raise additional capital and for other purposes.
- Citation: 1 Edw. 8 & 1 Geo. 6. c. li

Dates
- Royal assent: 1 July 1937
Other legislation
Repealed by	Hastings Pier Act 1985

Status: Repealed

Text of statute as originally enacted

Hastings Pier Act 1960
- Act of Parliament
- Parliament of the United Kingdom
- Long title: An Act to increase the powers of the Hastings Pier Company and for other purposes.
- Citation: 8 & 9 Eliz. 2. c. xxxviii

Dates
- Royal assent: 29 July 1960
Other legislation
Repealed by	Hastings Pier Act 1985

Status: Repealed

Text of statute as originally enacted

Hastings Pier Act 1985
- Act of Parliament
- Parliament of the United Kingdom
- Long title: An Act to repeal, and re-enact with amendments, the Hastings Pier Acts and Orders 1867 to 1960; and to make further provision with respect to the Hastings Pier Company; and for other purposes.
- Citation: 1985 c. xxxiii

Dates
- Royal assent: 25 July 1985

Text of statute as originally enacted

The pier was authorised by the Hastings Pier Act 1867 (30 & 31 Vict. c. clxxxvii), and opened on 5 August 1872 by the then Lord Warden of the Cinque Ports, Earl of Granville. It was designed by Eugenius Birch, who also designed the West Pier, Brighton and Eastbourne Pier, both west of Hastings, and it is often seen as an innovative design considering the technical constraints of the late Victorian period. The pier was "constructed by a local company", while the contractors were the firm R Laidlaw & Son, Glasgow. 600 guests sat down to lunch on the pier immediately following the opening ceremony, and included the local member of parliament Thomas Brassey and Egyptian princes.

The original 2,000 seater pavilion was destroyed by fire in 1917. This was eventually replaced in 1922 and played host in the 1960s and the 1970s to notable artists such as The Rolling Stones, The Who, Jimi Hendrix, Genesis, Tom Jones, Ten Years After, and Pink Floyd. Pink Floyd founder Syd Barrett played his last show with the band here on 20 January 1968.

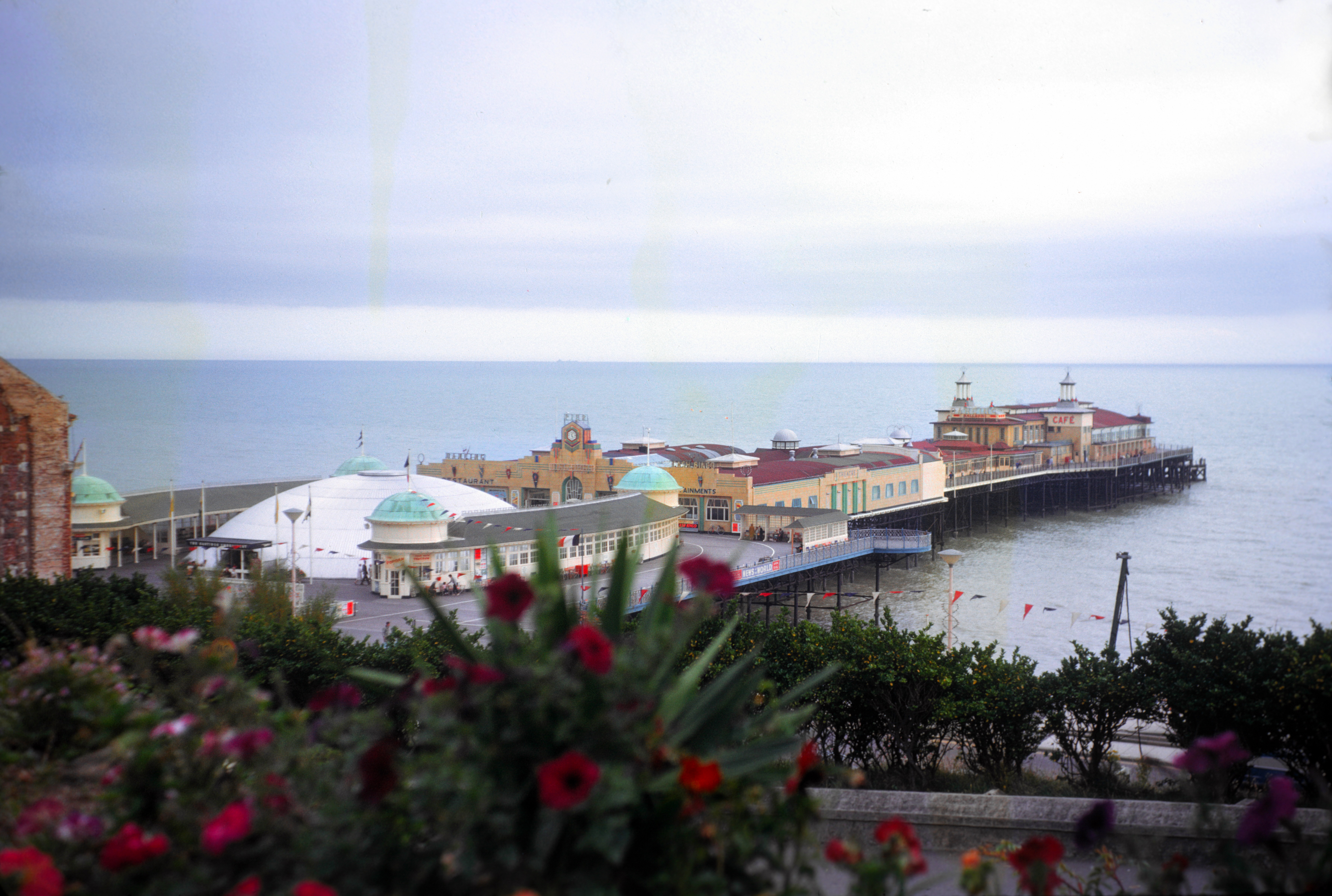
In 1966 the Hastings Embroidery was displayed in the white domed structure for the 900th anniversary celebrations of the Battle of Hastings.

During the 1930s, the pavilion extension buildings received an art deco facelift and a theatre rebuild. This was to be its prime era.

Like most piers on the south coast of England, Hastings Pier was closed during the Second World War due to concerns about it being used as a landing station for enemy craft. It also suffered minor bomb damage.

More renovation followed its temporary closure during WWII and in 1966 it housed the Hastings Embroidery during the 900th anniversary celebrations of the Battle of Hastings. The Embroidery was housing in the specially built 'Triodome' which was initially intended as a one-year temporary structure.

Hastings Pier became a Grade II listed building as a historic structure in 1976. From the 1980s onwards, ownership and management of Hastings Pier changed hands on a regular basis with erratic structural renovation input from its owners. The 'Triodome' was removed from Hastings Pier in 1986, nineteen years longer than it had been intended to remain for, and was rebuilt temporarily on Brighton Palace Pier as a replacement for the demolished Palace Pier Theatre, where it was intended to remain for five years. It remains on Brighton Palace Pier as of 2026.

In 1990 it suffered considerable storm damage, requiring a £1 million refurbishment. In 1996 it was put up for sale, but the future of the pier was put in grave doubt as interested buyers were reluctant to invest due to the serious amount of capital needed to improve the unstable structural supports. Financial losses led to the appointment of liquidators Leonard Curtis who closed the pier in 1999.

The pier was eventually sold in 2000 and reopened under new ownership in 2002. It was passed to Ravenclaw, an offshore enterprise in 2004.

=== Pier access withdrawn ===
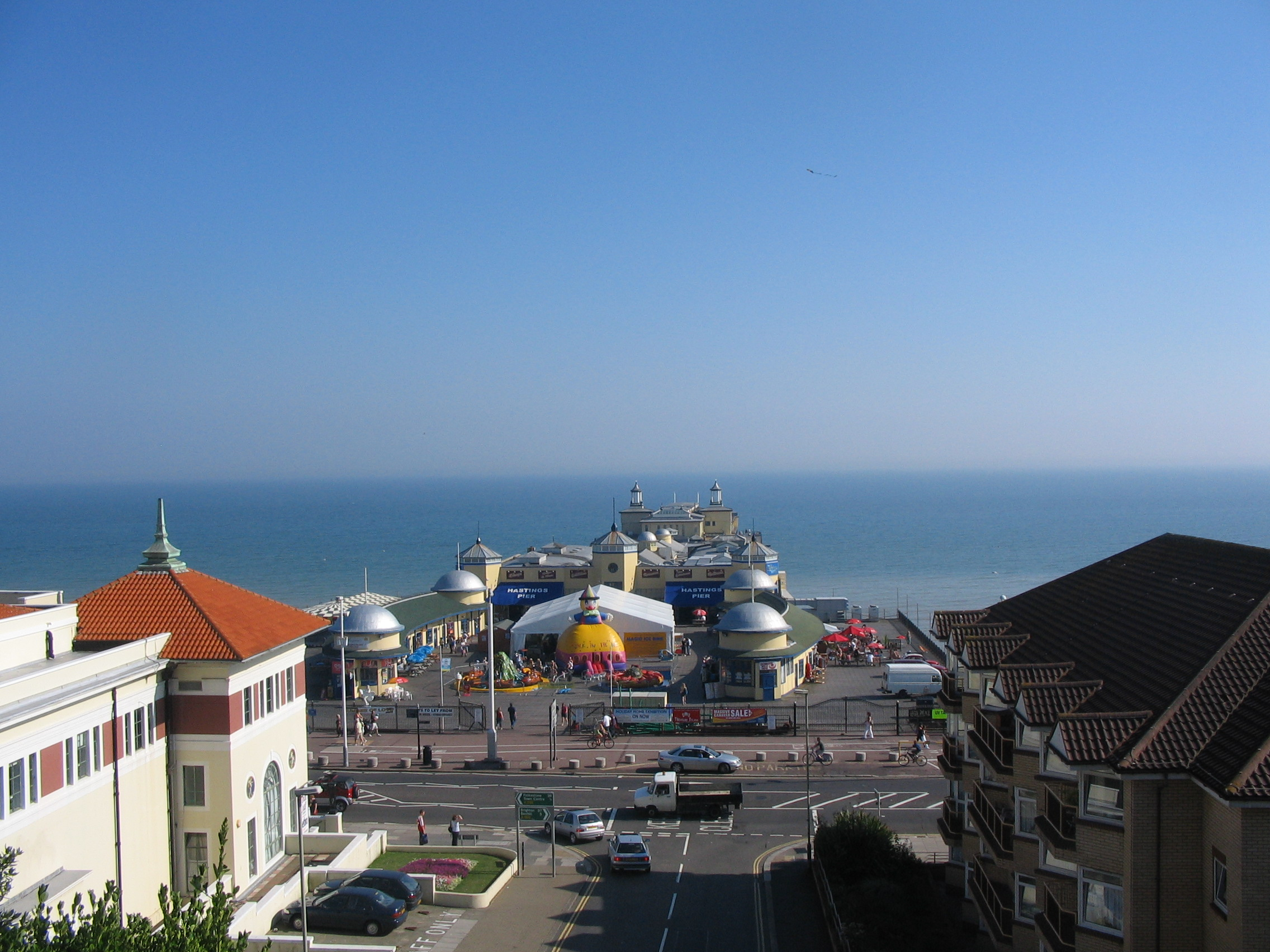
Hastings Pier in 2005

In July 2006, Hastings Borough Council, upon discovering that part of the pier's structure was unsafe, promptly closed the pier to the general public. Protracted legal wranglings between the pier's owners, Ravenclaw Investments, and Hastings Borough Council followed. Finally, Stylus Sports, a pier tenant who operated the gaming attractions, in conjunction with Hastings Borough Council, funded much of the needed £300,000 of repairs, which enabled the court order closing the pier to be lifted. This financial infusion enabled the majority of the pier to reopen on 4 July 2007.

However, on 12 March 2008 the local newspaper Hastings Observer reported to concerned readers how storm damage had caused considerable damage and that two support columns were in imminent danger of collapse. To prevent public access and any resulting injuries, stronger barriers restricting public access to the damaged areas were put in place and repairs to the bracing fixtures prevented any disaster from occurring. Nevertheless, when the remaining major tenant closed for business, access to the pier was restricted. The failure of the owners to respond to appeals from the Council to repair the areas and the continual deterioration of the structure led to its long-term future becoming uncertain.

=== Efforts to save the pier ===
The Hastings Pier and White Rock Trust (HPWRT) was established to raise funds through various means to renovate the pier, ranging from community fund raising to larger scale grant applications. Their long-term goal was to acquire the pier and form a not-for-profit company to renovate, reopen and revitalise the pier as a community owned asset. The Hastings Pier and White Rock Trust strongly opposed any decision to demolish and clear the site of the structure.

A protest march was held on 17 October 2009 as part of a campaign to save the pier.

In November 2009 the owners of The Grand Pier in Weston-super-Mare examined the possibility of purchasing Hastings Pier and restoring it to its former glory. However, after a structural assessment it was estimated that repairs would cost over £24 million, with a similar amount needed to restore attractions at the pier head. The structural engineers commented that the pier was "one good storm away from collapse".

=== October 2010 fire ===
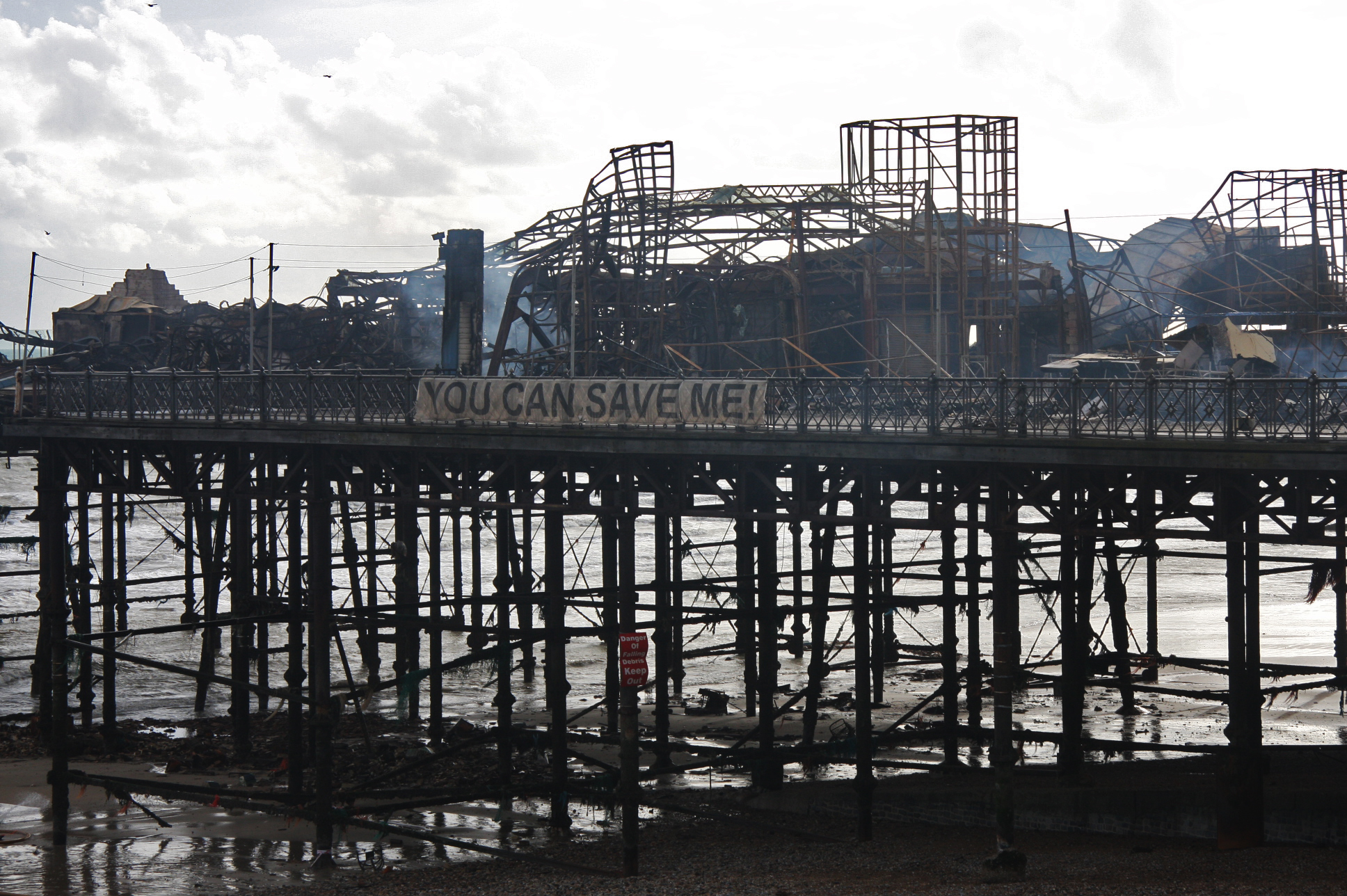
Hastings Pier after the 2010 fire

The pier suffered extensive fire damage during the early hours of Tuesday 5 October 2010. Although the fire brigade arrived shortly after being alerted (at approximately 01:00 BST), the fire had quickly spread causing severe damage to the wooden buildings. Estimates indicate that 95% of the superstructure of the pier was subsequently destroyed in the fire. Two people were arrested on suspicion of arson, but, despite numerous bail hearings, no charges were made.

=== Redevelopment plans ===
Prior to its destruction in a fire on 5 October 2010, Hastings Pier was deemed to be the pier most at risk in the UK by the National Piers Society. Despite funding set-backs in 2009, such as the withdrawal of Capacity Builders grants, the Hastings Pier and White Rock Trust had made efforts to revitalise the pier. On 1 February 2010, Hastings Borough Council finally resolved to develop an approval in principle to compulsorily purchase the Pier on the agreement of a business plan and suitable funding source. The decision followed a study which showed the pier could be made safe for public use for £3million. On 16 March, Hastings Pier & White Rock Trust successfully obtained a £75k Feasibility grant to fund the completion of necessary engineering surveys and architectural plans for their overall business plan of securing capital funding.

Following the fire in October that year, an English Heritage assessment confirmed that the previously noted heritage value of the substructure remained so the Hastings Pier & White Rock Trust submitted an application for £8.75m to the Heritage Lottery at the end of November 2010 to restore the substructure of the Pier and renovate the remaining building. Heritage Lottery trustees visited the project and pier on 16 March 2011 to assess the application. Hastings Borough Council were granted £100k toward emergency works by English Heritage in April 2011. This funding was intended to pay for structural supports to be applied to the central section which was weakened by the loss of the deck in the fire.

In May 2011, it was announced by Heritage Lottery Fund that a Stage 1 development grant, releasing the first £357,400 of a total £8.75m grant was awarded by Heritage Lottery. This development grant was intended to complete the business plan, develop the heritage learning and activities programme and raise the £1m funding match. In the meantime, Hastings Borough Council intended to progress the CPO. The remaining award (Stage 2) was subject to the funding match being raised, the authorisation of the business plan by the HLF and the successful completion of the CPO.

The redevelopment of the pier was designed by the architectural practice dRMM. The charity went into administration in 2017 and the pier was sold to a private buyer in 2018.

== Pier re-opening ==
In August 2013, a compulsory purchase order was enacted and the pier was returned to local ownership which enabled a £14m renovation project to go forward. The work was completed in early 2016, and the pier was reopened to the public on 27 April 2016.

Since re-opening, the pier has won the National Piers Society's "Pier of the Year" award in 2017, with Worthing Pier and Llandudno Pier in second and third place.

The redeveloped pier was awarded the 2017 Stirling Prize for architecture, considered to be the most prestigious architecture award in the United Kingdom.

The organisation running the pier went into administration in November 2017, leaving the future of the pier uncertain.

Hastings Pier was purchased on 15 June 2018 by controversial local businessman Abid Gulzar, who also owns Eastbourne Pier. The pier re-opened on 25 July 2018. The pier closed in December 2018 and re-opened on 1 April 2019.

== On film ==
The pier has featured in many films and TV series, such as The Dark Man (1951), ITV wartime drama Foyle's War and the film Byzantium (2012).

In 2015 a feature-length documentary about Hastings Pier (titled Re: A Pier) was completed by filmmaker Archie Lauchlan.

== Gallery ==
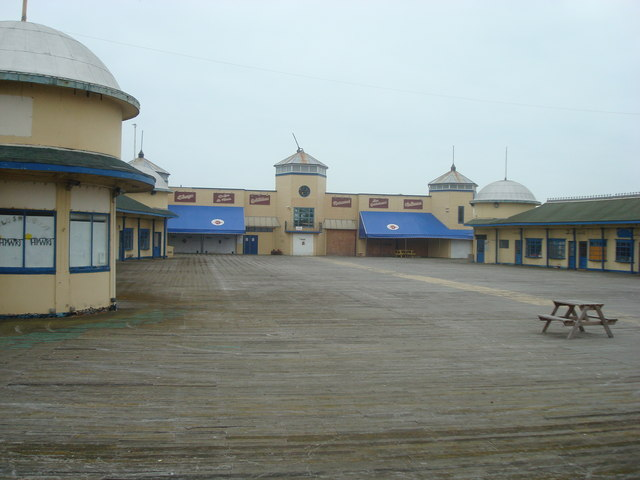
The former entrance

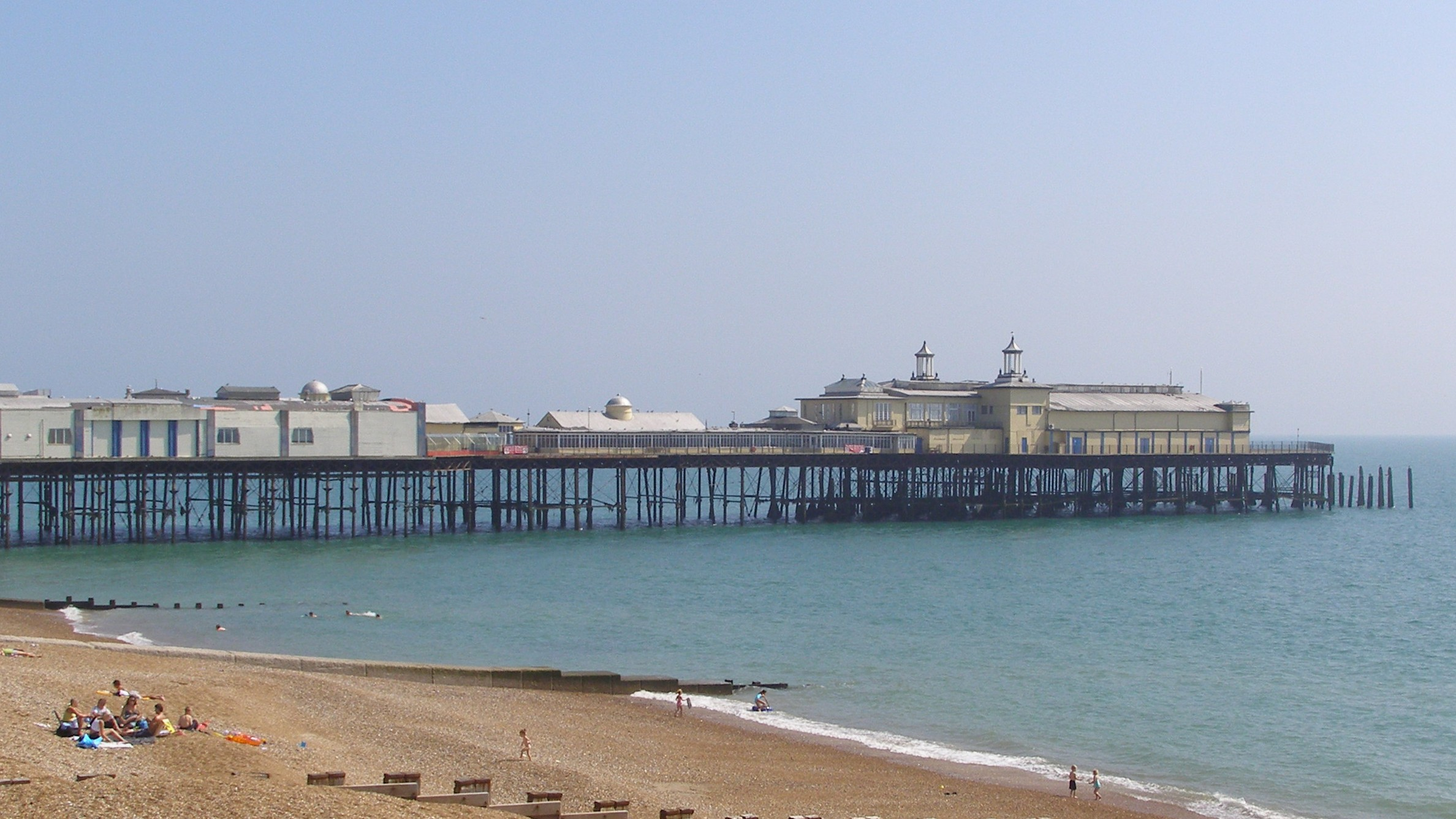
Hastings Pier before the fire in 2007

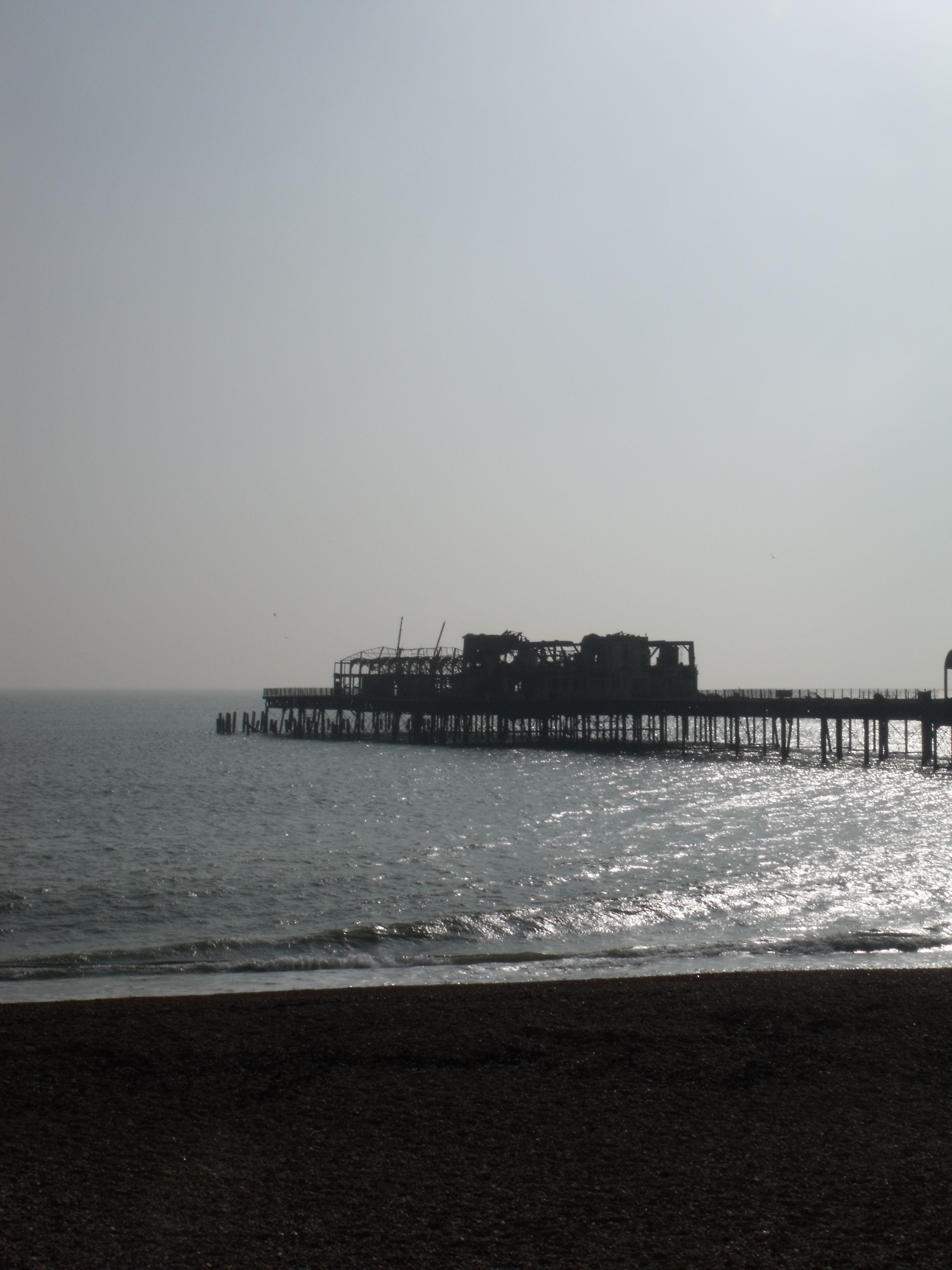
Hastings Pier seaward end fire damage

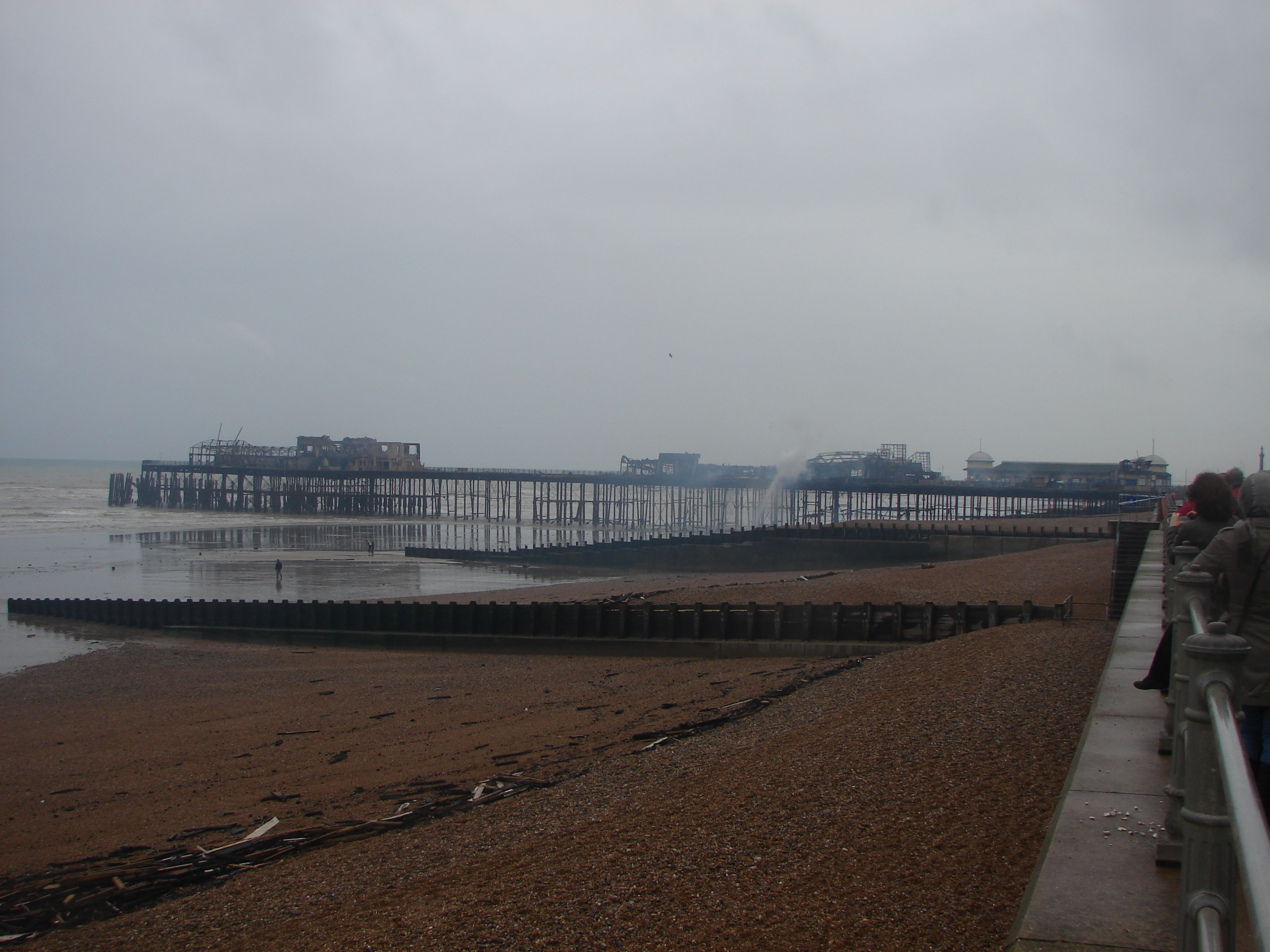
Hastings Pier on the morning after the fire, 6 October 2010

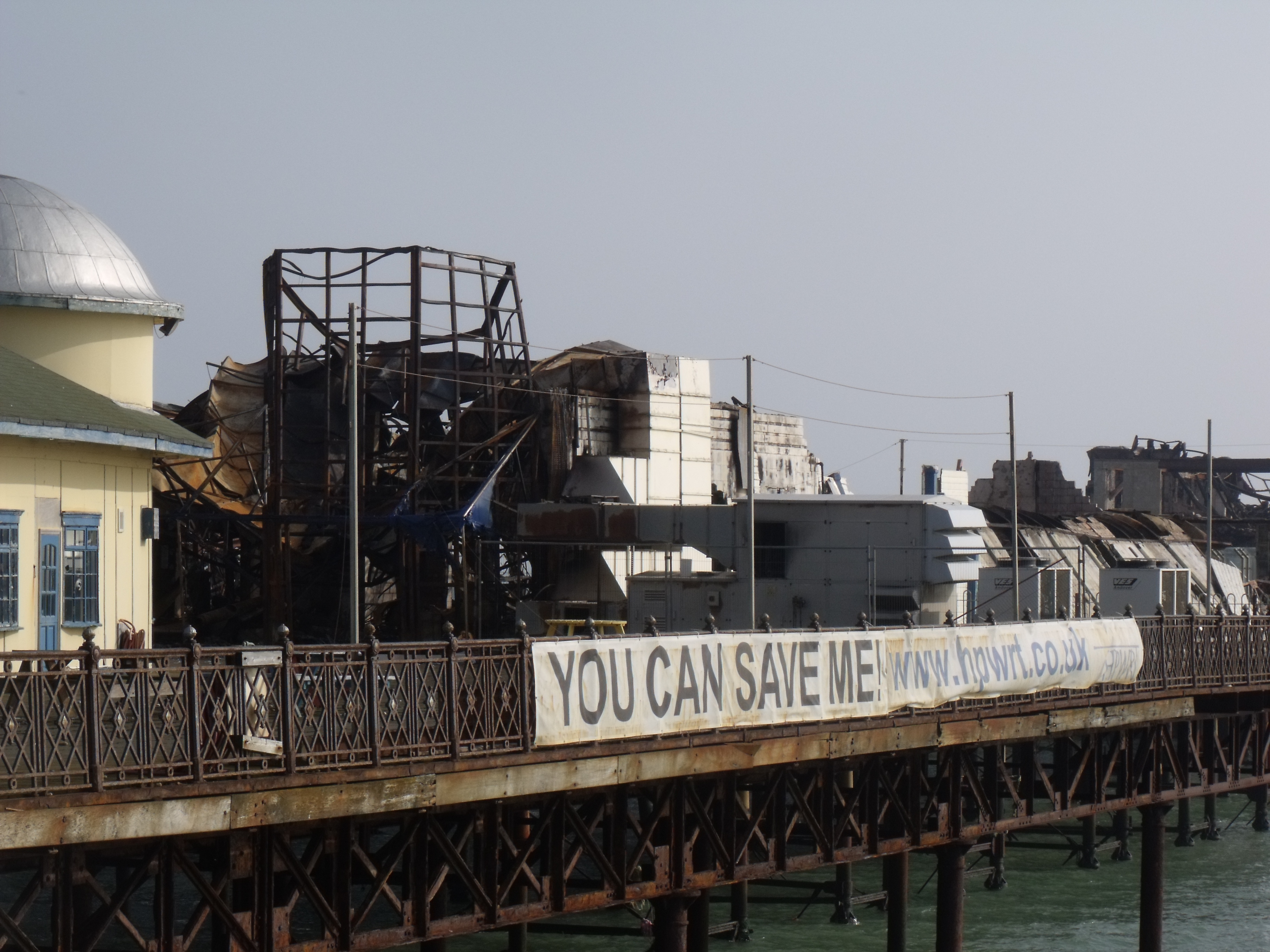
Shore-end damage to Hastings Pier, 9 October 2010

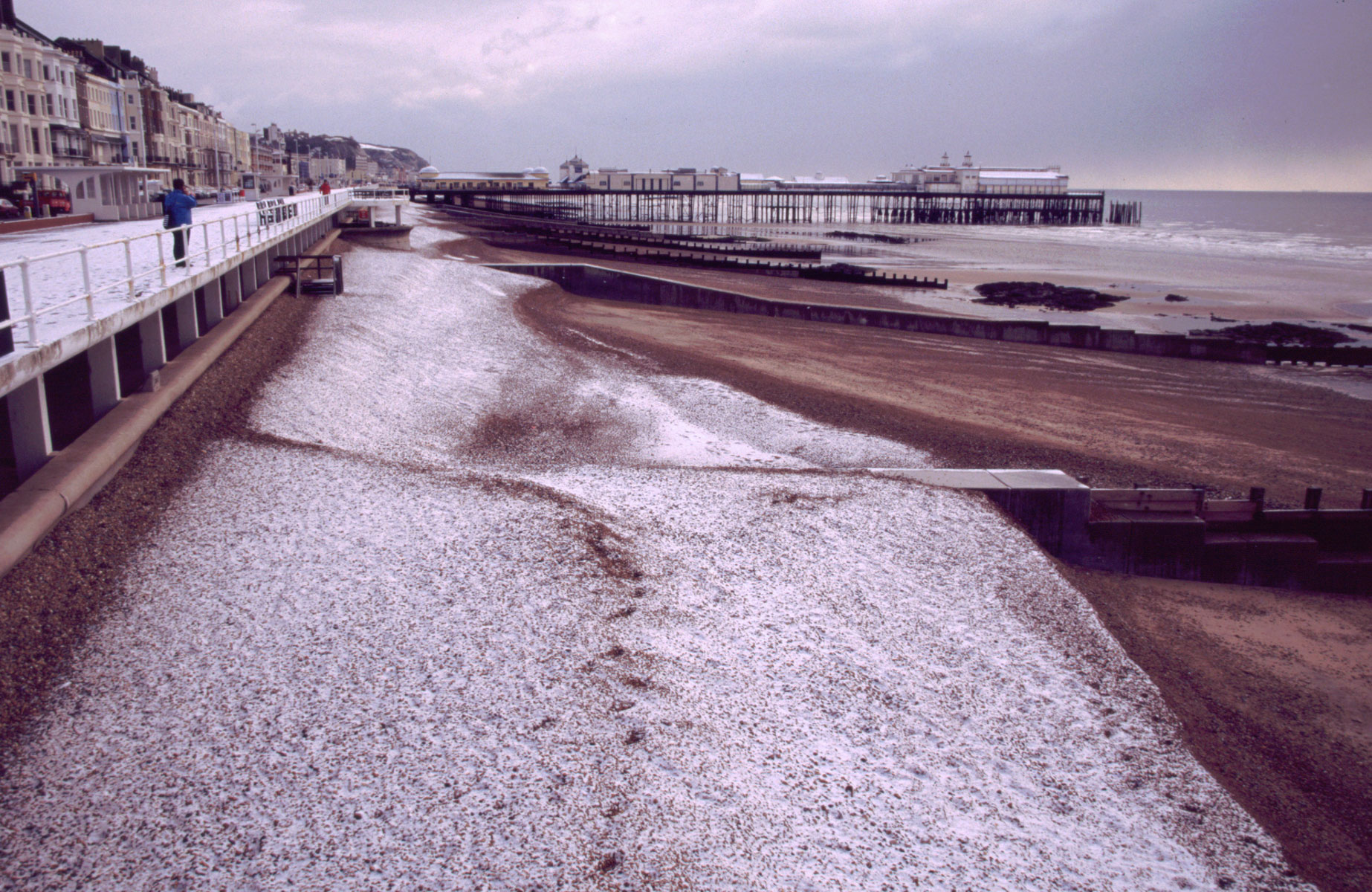
Hastings Pier from the beach

Awards and achievements
Preceded by Newport Street Gallery, Vauxhall	Royal Institute of British Architects; Stirling Prize; 2017	Succeeded by Bloomberg London
Preceded by Cleethorpes Pier	National Piers Society; Pier of the Year; 2017	Succeeded by South Parade Pier, Southsea
