= Infrastructure Transitions Research Consortium =

The UK Infrastructure Transitions Research Consortium (ITRC) was established in January 2011. The ITRC provides data and modelling to help governments, policymakers and other stakeholders in infrastructure make more sustainable and resilient infrastructure decisions. It is a collaboration between seven universities and more than 55 partners from infrastructure policy and practice.

During its first research programme, running from 2011 to 2016, ITRC developed the world's first national infrastructure system-of-systems model, known as NISMOD (National Infrastructure Systems Model) which has been used to analyse long-term investment strategies for energy, transport, digital communications, water, waste water and solid waste. This work is described in the book The Future of National Infrastructure, an introduction to the NISMOD models and tools describing their application to inform infrastructure planning in Britain.

The second phase of this programme (2016–2021) is called ITRC-MISTRAL where MISTRAL stands for Multi-Scale Infrastructure Systems Analytics. MISTRAL allowed ITRC to develop the national-scale modelling in ITRC to simulate infrastructure at city, regional and global scales.

Based in the University of Oxford's Environmental Change Institute, ITRC is led by Director Jim Hall who is also Professor of Environmental Risks at the University of Oxford.

Funding: The ITRC is funded by two programme grants from the UK Engineering and Physical Science and Research Council (EPSRC). The 2011–2016 ITRC programme grant was £4.7m and the 2016–2021 grant, for ITRC-MISTRAL, is £5.4m.

Consortium: The seven universities making up the ITRC consortium are: University of Southampton, University of Oxford, Newcastle University, Cardiff University, University of Cambridge, University of Leeds and University of Sussex.

Partners: ITRC's partners are from across the infrastructure sector. They include infrastructure investors such as the World Bank, consultancies including Ordnance Survey and KPMG, providers such as Siemens, High Speed 2 (HS2), Network Rail and National Grid, policy-makers (i.e. Environment Agency) and regulatory bodies (OFCOM).
