= Bridget Rosewell =

British economist

Bridget Clare Rosewell CBE
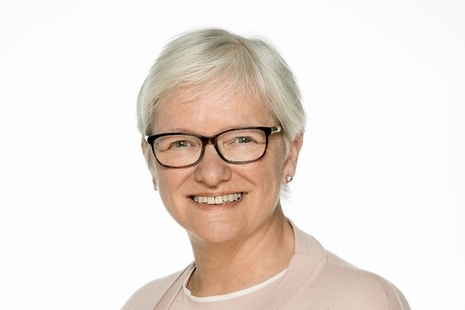
- Rosewell in 2018
- Born: 18 September 1951 (age 75); Wimbledon, UK

Academic background
- Education: Oxford University (MA, MPhil)
- Awards: CBE

Bridget Clare Rosewell CBE, FAcSS (née Mills, born 18 September 1951), is a British economist, specialising in transport, infrastructure and related policy analysis.

== Early life and education ==
The daughter of Geoffrey Noel Mills and Helen Handescombe née Rodd, she was born in Wimbledon, England, and educated at Wimbledon High School (1958–69) before going up to read Politics and Economics at St Hugh's College, Oxford, graduating BA (1974) then taking a MPhil in Economics (1976).

She was a Lecturer in economics at St Hilda's College, Oxford (1976–78), and at Somerville College, Oxford (1978–81), then a Tutor in economics at Oriel College, Oxford (1981–84). She was concurrently a research officer in the Department of Economics and Statistics, Oxford University (1976–81).

== Career ==
Rosewell served as Deputy Director, Economics at the Confederation of British Industry, then left to found a number of consultancies, including Business Strategies Ltd, now part of Experian.

Rosewell is Senior Adviser to Volterra Partners, which she founded in 1998 with Paul Ormerod. Bridget's current business interests include Chair of Audit for Network Rail, and for Atom Bank and the With Profits Committee for the Royal London Group. She is also a Commissioner for the independent National Infrastructure Commission and has led on its project on Northern connectivity and the East West corridor from Cambridge to Oxford.

She has chaired the Board of Governors at Wimbledon High School and previously sat on the boards of Britannia Building Society, Ulster Bank and the Department for Work and Pensions. She was the Chief Economist and Chief Economic Adviser to the Greater London Authority between 2002 and 2012. She has previously founded and developed three successful consultancies. She has also given evidence as an expert witness in a number of major competition cases as well as at several Planning Inquiries.

=== Contributions to economics ===
Rosewell is interested in the concept of agglomeration, which quantifies the positive effects of the increases in economic density brought about by new infrastructure such as bridges and rail links.

Her work includes studies on risk and risk management, infrastructure and its funding, public and private sector co-operation, planning policy, and corporate management. She publishes and presents in these areas as well as working with clients.

Other work includes studies of the evolution of market structures, including in the market for pollution permits; urban systems; and statistical model validation.

=== Research interests ===
Rosewell's research interests focus on the economic performance of local economies, the role of infrastructure, the performance of markets, and business organisations. She is especially interested in the application of the tools of complex systems analysis to these issues.

== Honours ==
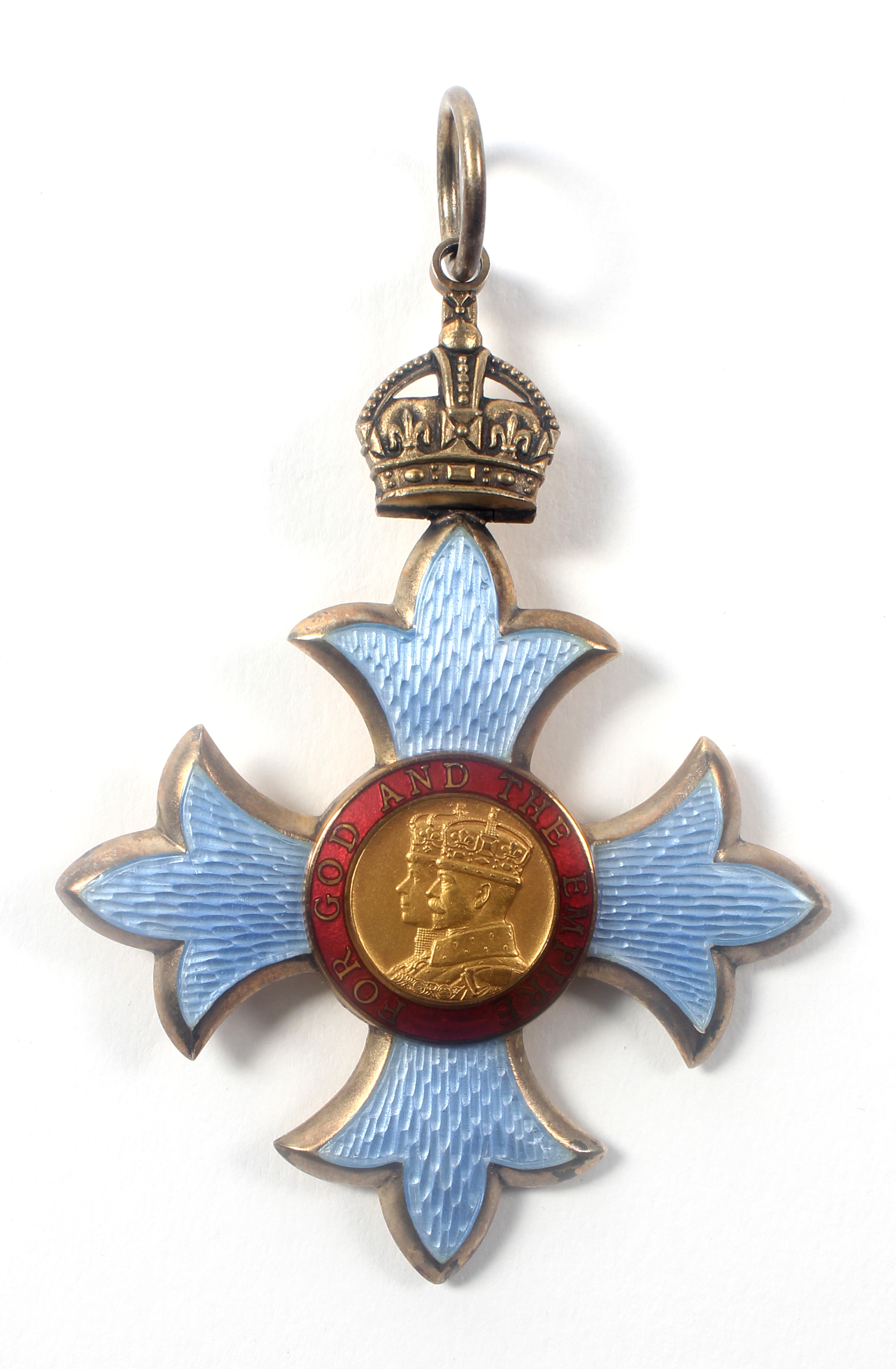
CBE insignia

In the 2013 Birthday Honours, Rosewell was appointed Officer of the Order of the British Empire (OBE), and promoted Commander of the Order of the British Empire (CBE) in the 2019 New Year Honours "for services to the economy".

In 2016, she was elected a Fellow of the Academy of Social Sciences (FAcSS).

Rosewell has been admitted to the Freedom of the City of London and, since 2023, serves as Renter Warden of the Worshipful Company of Curriers.

== Personal life ==
Divorced, with two adult children, Mrs Rosewell speaks fluent French and basic German. Her hobbies include painting, walking, reading and picture-framing.
