= Uxbridge (disambiguation) =

Uxbridge is a town in the London Borough of Hillingdon which is near Heathrow Airport and Hounslow. There is a road called Uxbridge Road in London too.

Uxbridge may also refer to:

== Places ==
- RAF Uxbridge, a UK Air Force base
- Uxbridge, Massachusetts, United States
- Uxbridge, Ontario, Canada
- Uxbridge Road in Howick, New Zealand and a railroad station on the former Kurow Branch rail line
- Uxbridge Township, North Dakota, United States
- Uxbridge, Tasmania, a Postal code zone in Tasmania, Australia

== Other ==
- Earl of Uxbridge, a subsidiary title held by the Marquess of Anglesey, formerly a title in its own right
- Uxbridge Art Gallery, an art gallery in New Zealand
- Uxbridge (UK Parliament constituency)
- Uxbridge and South Ruislip (UK Parliament constituency)
- William Uxbridge, English MP

== See also ==
- Uxbridge station (disambiguation)
- Oxbridge (disambiguation)
