= Hastings Embroidery =

1965 tapestry by the Royal School of Needlework

The Hastings Embroidery was commissioned by Group Captain Ralph Ward and made by the Royal School of Needlework in 1965 to celebrate the 900th anniversary of the Battle of Hastings the following year.

Intended to be a modern-day equivalent of the Bayeux Tapestry, the embroidery consists of 27 panels, each 9 ft × 3 ft (2.7 m × 0.9 m), and shows 81 great events in British history during the 900 years from 1066 to 1966. It took 22 embroiderers 10 months to finish.

The embroidery is worked in appliqué by hand, with the addition of couched threads and cords, tweed from Scotland, fabrics from the Victoria and Albert Museum, and feathers from London Zoo.

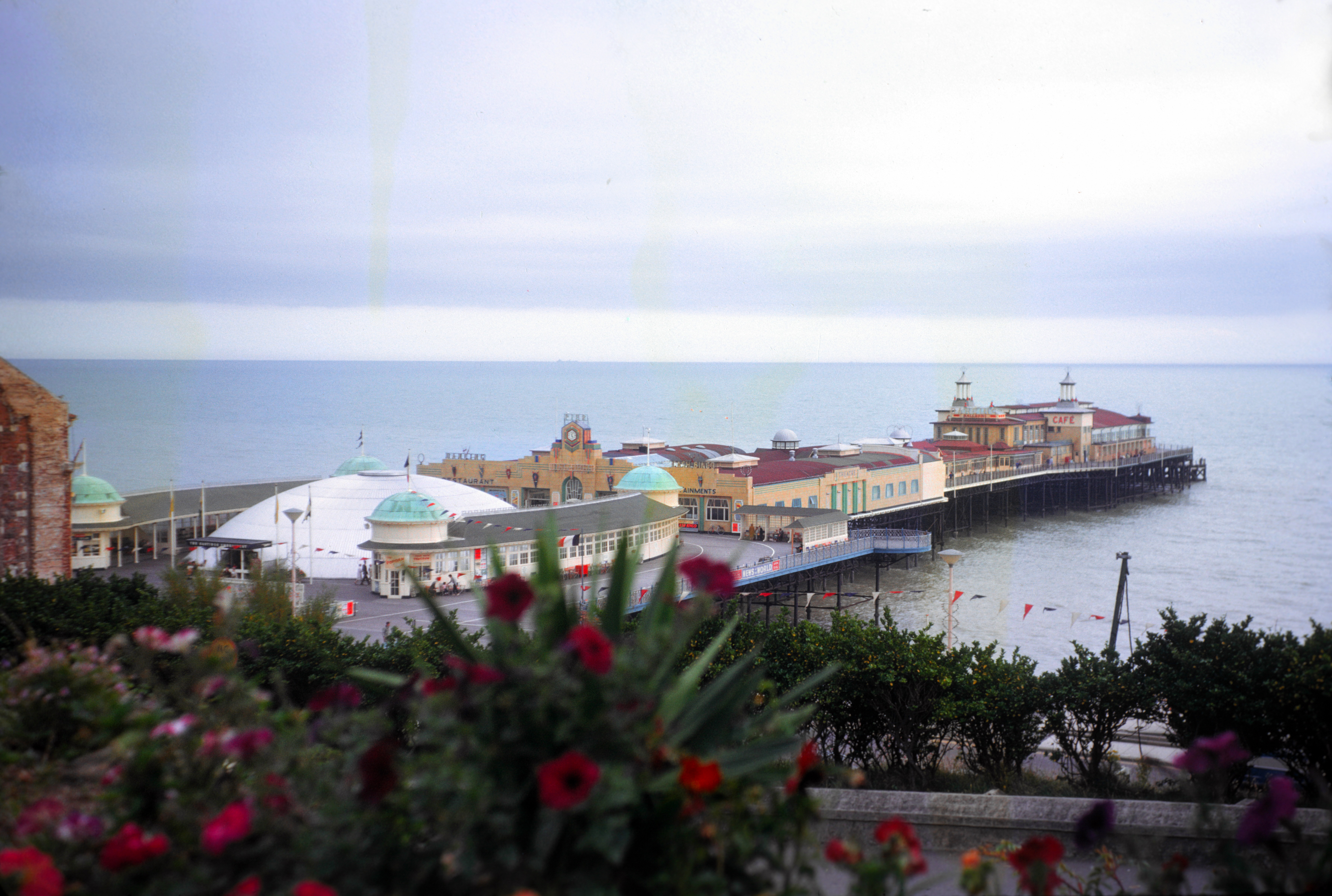
The Hastings Embroidery was displayed in the white domed structure on the old Hastings Pier in 1966.

It was on public display in Hastings, firstly in the Town Hall and then on the pier in a dome-shaped building.

As of 2026, it is in storage, and apart from two panels on permanent display in the Town Hall, cannot be viewed, despite local protests. It has been said that to preserve the cloth and appliqué, special display facilities would have to be constructed, and that the cost of this would be prohibitive.

In March 2018 Hastings Borough Council announced that it would be "very happy for any organization to have it free of charge to display", provided they have the space and appropriate conditions for preservation.

Between May and October 2019 all 27 panels of the Hastings Embroidery were displayed to the public in Rye, East Sussex, for the first time since it was locked up in storage. The exhibition was accompanied by an immersive media installation by Tim Hopkins and newly commissioned music piece entitled Stitched by Robert Thomas.

It was displayed again in the autumn of 2026 in Hastings Town Hall.
