= Oxbridge Academy (South Africa) =

Private distance learning college based in South Africa

Oxbridge Academy is a private distance learning college based in Stellenbosch, South Africa. It was founded in 1997, to help address the skills shortage in the South African job market. Oxbridge Academy also offers courses to students internationally, but the majority of their students are situated in southern Africa.

Along with TVET (formerly public FET) colleges and other private colleges, Oxbridge Academy was established to provide students with greater access to further education opportunities, regardless of their academic background and economic status.

In July 2016, Oxbridge Academy partnered with the ADvTECH Group, with the aim of increasing the distance education offering in Africa.

== Accreditation Status ==
In South Africa, there is currently some debate surrounding the accreditation status of private colleges and the courses that they offer.

In terms of current legislation, all private colleges offering qualifications registered on the National Qualifications Framework (NQF) are required to be registered with the relevant accrediting bodies, which may include the Department of Higher Education and Training (DHET), the Council on Higher Education (CHE), and the Quality Council for Trades and Occupations (QCTO). Oxbridge Academy is registered with the DHET and the QCTO, and is also accredited by other relevant accrediting bodies to offer certain courses.

=== National ===
- Oxbridge Academy is provisionally registered as a private college under the Further Education and Training Colleges Act 16 of 2006. Registration number: 2009/FE07/070.
- They are provisionally accredited by Umalusi – the Council for Quality Assurance in General and Further Education and Training in South Africa. Registration number: 15 FET02 00031 PA.
- The college is fully accredited by the Quality Council for Trades and Occupations (QCTO) to offer NATED courses. Registration number: QCTO NATED/13/005.
- The college is accredited by the South African Institute of Occupational Safety and Health (Saiosh) to offer various occupational health and safety courses. Membership number: 41333225
- In addition to their accreditation with the bodies mentioned above, they have learning programme approval from the Education, Training and Development Practices Sector Education and Training Authority (ETDP Seta) and they are a member of the Association of Private Providers of Education, Training and Development (APPETD).
- In 2017, Oxbridge Academy was approved by The Independent Institute of Education (IIE) to launch three IIE-endorsed courses.

== Mode of delivery ==
The courses are all offered on a distance learning basis. Distance learning, particularly in the South African context, gives students the opportunity to further their studies even when they do not have access to transport, or when they are required to work to support their families, instead of undergoing further education on a full-time basis.
