= Infrastructure and Projects Authority =

Former United Kingdom government agency

Agency overview
- Formed: 1 January 2016
- Preceding agencies: Infrastructure UK; Major Projects Authority
- Dissolved: 1 April 2025
- Jurisdiction: United Kingdom
- Headquarters: 1 Horse Guards Road, London, United Kingdom
- Employees: 180 (2024)
- Agency executive: Nick Smallwood, Chief Executive
- Parent agency: Cabinet Office and HM Treasury
- Website: IPA

The Infrastructure and Projects Authority (IPA) was, between 2016 and April 2025, the United Kingdom government's centre of expertise for infrastructure and major projects. The IPA reported to the Cabinet Office and HM Treasury. The core teams included experts in infrastructure, project delivery and project finance who worked with government departments and industry.

The IPA supported delivery of all types of infrastructure and major projects; ranging from railways, schools, hospitals and housing, to defence, IT and major transformation programmes. The IPA led the project delivery and project finance professions across government through the Government Major Projects Portfolio. It was superseded by the National Infrastructure and Service Transformation Authority (NISTA), established in April 2025.

== History ==
The Major Project Authority was established in 2011 after the 2010 United Kingdom general election with a mandate to oversee and assure the largest government projects. The MPA´s second annual report from 2014 stated that "successive governments failed to deliver major projects effectively" and that there had been "lack of project management skills across the Civil Service; too fast a turnover of project leaders; inadequate assurance processes and institutional knowledge". The MPA did not exist very long as in 2016 it merged with Infrastructure UK (IUK) to form the Infrastructure and Projects Authority. The IPA Chief Executive was Tony Meggs until July 2019, when he was replaced by Nick Smallwood. IUK had been established in 2010 to support major infrastructure projects involving public sector capital.

In December 2017 the IPA issued the Transforming Infrastructure Performance report aimed at achieving annual savings of £15 billion per year in infrastructure procurement by increasing collaboration and innovation. On 13 September 2021, a follow-up report, Transforming Infrastructure Performance: Roadmap to 2030, was published alongside the National Infrastructure and Construction Pipeline forecasting £650bn investment in UK infrastructure over the next decade.

In May 2024, ahead of the 2024 United Kingdom general election, the Labour Party announced plans to merge the IPA with the National Infrastructure Commission in order to speed up the delivery of major infrastructure projects in the UK. The new body would be called the National Infrastructure and Service Transformation Authority. NISTA was established in April 2025 as a joint unit of the Treasury and Cabinet Office, with Darren Jones as the responsible minister.

== Projects delivered ==
The MPA and later the IPA supported delivery of all types of major projects; ranging from railways, schools, hospitals and housing, to defence, IT and major transformation programmes for example creating digital public services.

== See also ==
- High Speed 2 § New chief executive assessment and Stewart Review
- Infrastructure Client Group
- Megaproject
