= Uxbridge station (disambiguation) =

Uxbridge station may refer to:

- Uxbridge tube station, a rapid transit station in London, England
- Uxbridge Road tube station, a former rapid transit station in London, England
- Uxbridge Vine Street railway station, a former railway station in London, England
- Uxbridge High Street railway station, a former railway station in London, England
- Uxbridge station (Ontario), a former railway station in Ontario, Canada
- Uxbridge station (Massachusetts), a former railway station in Massachusetts, United States
