= Oxford–Cambridge Arc =

Notional arc 50 miles NW-NE of London

Oxford-Cambridge Arc

- Country: United Kingdom
- Constituent country: England
- Region: East Midlands (Northamptonshire); East of England (Bedfordshire and Cambridgeshire); South East England (Buckinghamshire and Oxfordshire)
- Counties: Bedfordshire; Buckinghamshire; Cambridgeshire; Northamptonshire; Oxfordshire

The Oxford–Cambridge Arc or Oxford–Cambridge Growth Corridor (formerly the Cambridge – Milton Keynes – Oxford corridor) is a notional arc of agricultural and urban land at about 80 km (50 mi) radius of London, in south central England. It runs between the British university cities of Oxford and Cambridge via Milton Keynes and includes other settlements in Bedfordshire, Buckinghamshire, Cambridgeshire, Northamptonshire and Oxfordshire, at the northern rim of the London commuter belt. It is significant only in economic geography, with little physical geography in common.

The original Oxford to Cambridge (O2C) Arc initiative was launched in 2003 by three English regional development agencies (RDAs), EEDA, EMDA and SEEDA. The aim of the initiative is to promote and accelerate the development of the unique set of educational, research and business assets and activities that characterise the area and in doing so, create an "arc of innovation and entrepreneurial activity that would, in time, be 'best in the field'".

In November 2017, a report for the National Infrastructure Commission (NIC) noted that, "in 2014, the Gross Value Added (GVA) of the "corridor" was £90.5bn (2011 prices); by doubling housebuilding rates in the area, and delivering East West Rail and the Oxford–Cambridge Expressway, this [would] increase by £163bn to a GVA of £250bn". In February 2021, the Government announced plans to develop the concept further, but cancelled the Abingdon–Milton Keynes link of the expressway in March 2021. In January 2025, Chancellor Rachel Reeves confirmed funding for the Bedford–Cambridge section of the railway, (Note: As of November 2026, the Oxford–Bletchley section has been modernised and is providing a route for freight; the Oxford–Bicester and the Bletchley–Bedford sections are open for passenger services; passenger services on the Bicester–Bletchley section have yet to commence due to an industrial dispute.) stating her view that the "Oxford–Cambridge Growth Corridor" has the potential to become "Europe's Silicon Valley".

== Industry and infrastructure ==
The Arc is a major centre of the UK's high tech manufacturing and research industries. It is serviced by four international airports (Stansted, Luton, Heathrow and Birmingham), all located just outside the Arc itself. Cranfield Airport, Cambridge Airport and London Oxford Airport take executive jets. Cambridge Airport is an important centre for aircraft maintenance.

Other major industries include agriculture, tourism, construction, entertainment, education, retail and finance. Commuting and business travel within the arc is relatively difficult in the absence of east–west infrastructure.

As of November 2027, the planned Oxford–Cambridge East West Rail runs only between Oxford and Milton Keynes (at Bletchley); the section between Bletchley and Bedford is substandard but refurbishment is scheduled. The Bedford–Cambridge section is funded but its alignment remains to be decided. Of the cancelled Oxford–Cambridge Expressway, the route is expressway standard (grade separated dual carriageway, 'GSDC') only between Cambridge and the A1198; the next section to the A1 near St Neots is a typical rural road, but work is in progress to bypass it with a new dual carriageway, due to open in Spring 2027. The route resumes as an expressway between the A1 and the M1 (at Junction 13). (Note: From there, the A421 is a busy urban route through Milton Keynes and then a (mostly) single carriageway rural road as far as the A43 (a GSDC that joins the M40 at Junction 10). The route leaves the M40 at junction 9 as the A34, becoming the northern section of Oxford's ring road.)

== Future ==
In 2017, the National Infrastructure Commission projected that the Arc will become host to major hi-tech industrial developments and will need to provide one million new homes by 2050, with Milton Keynes alone doubling in population to 500,000. To facilitate this development (and wider national infrastructure needs for outer orbital routes around London), two major projects are underway or were planned.

Engineering work to extend East West Rail from Bicester to the West Coast Main Line at Bletchley (Milton Keynes) was completed in 2024 and is being used for freight but, due to an industrial dispute, passenger services have yet to start. Work to upgrade the Bletchley–Bedford section has begun; onward extension to Cambridge is in detailed planning.

Detailed route options planning began on the Oxford-Milton Keynes phase that was to complete the Oxford-Cambridge Expressway (linking the A34 south of Oxford with the A14 near Cambridge). However, in March 2021, the government cancelled this phase of the Expressway (though construction of the last remaining phase of the M11–A1–M1 element continues).

In February 2021, the Ministry for Housing, Communities and Local Government issued a policy paper setting out "the government's planned approach to developing the Oxford–Cambridge Arc Spatial Framework". The paper identifies the arc as an economic powerhouse with three significant issues that need to be resolved: the natural environment and climate change; connectivity and infrastructure; and the availability of homes where they are most needed.

== Universities ==
The Arc has a major university sector with 20,000 workers as part of the knowledge economy. Anglia Ruskin, Bedfordshire, Buckinghamshire New, Cambridge, Cranfield, Hertfordshire, Northampton, Open, Oxford and Oxford Brookes universities form the Arc Universities Group. The private University of Buckingham also lies within the Arc.

== Demographics ==
The Arc is one of the most ethnically diverse regions of the UK. Bedford, roughly central to the Arc and with a population of 100,000, is home to native speakers of over 100 languages, a figure which rivals London, Birmingham, Leeds and Manchester. The Arc has the fastest growing population of any of the similar regions within the UK; several of the major towns and cities, most notably Bicester and Milton Keynes, are set to double in size over the coming few decades, and others, such as Cambourne, have been built from scratch since the late 1990s.

Politically, the Arc is largely a Conservative stronghold, with only the urban constituencies returning Liberal Democrat or Labour MPs.

== Transport ==
The region is well served by major radial routes from London (the M40, M1, A1(M) and M11 motorways, and the West Coast Main Line, the Midland Main Line and the East Coast Main Line railways). However, routes around the arc are poor, with a disjointed and overloaded road network. (Note: The orbital route clockwise uses the A34 between M4 J13 and M40 J9 (causing significant environmental degradation at Botley). The route eastwards across J9 continues to Bicester as the A41 and in essence terminates there since the A41 diverts southeast to Aylesbury. Another route, the A43, leaves the M40 at J10 and heads northeast for Northampton. The A421 (the nominal orbital route) leaves the A43 near Croughton using a daisy-chain of mainly single carriageway roads with frequent roundabouts, passing through Buckingham and entering Milton Keynes. From here to the M1 at J13, the A421 is a dual carriageway and forms part of the Milton Keynes grid road system as the H8 Standing Way. From M1 J13 to the A14 at Girton (Cambridge), it is an (almost complete) expressway route across the A1 to join the A14. (At present, the A1–A14 link is numbered A428 but is to be renumbered as A421) and a fragmentary railway line (remnants of the former Varsity Line).

A twice-hourly express bus service, route X5, is operated by Stagecoach UK Buses from Oxford as far as Bedford but, with a rural service providing the Bedford–Cambridge link, it takes almost five hours to travel the 85 miles (137 km) between the university cities.

In November 2017, in its report on the Arc, the NIC called for the railway line between Bicester and Bletchley to be reopened by 2023 and a new route between Bedford and Cambridge to be operational by 2030, and for the development and construction of a new grade separated dual carriageway between the M1 and Oxford by 2030, as part of a new Oxford–Cambridge Expressway. The Expressway was cancelled in March 2021. as of July 2022, construction of East West Rail between Bicester and Bletchley (Milton Keynes) is complete and with entry into operation was scheduled for 2025. In 2022, the then (Conservative Party) Minister cast doubt on whether earlier commitments would be honoured; in 2025 the Labour government reaffirmed its support and funding for the line.

== Major settlements ==
=== Oxfordshire ===
- Oxford †‡
- Kidlington
- Didcot
- Abingdon-on-Thames
- Bicester †‡
- Banbury

=== Buckinghamshire ===
- Buckingham ‡
- Milton Keynes †‡*
- Aylesbury
- High Wycombe

=== Bedfordshire ===
- Ampthill
- Flitwick
- Kempston *
- Bedford †‡*
- Sandy (possibly † from Tempsford)
- Biggleswade

=== Cambridgeshire ===
- Cambourne †*
- Cambridge †*
- Huntingdon
- St Ives
- St Neots * (possibly † from Tempsford)

=== Northamptonshire ===
- Brackley
- Corby
- Daventry
- Kettering
- Northampton
- Rushden
- Wellingborough

‡ Places served by X5 route. Since August 2020, the service terminates at Bedford. Passengers for Cambridge must transfer to a rural multi-stop service,
† Places planned to be served by East West Rail. As of August 2022, plans for Sandy/Tempsford/St Neots services via EWR have not been detailed.
* Places that were planned to be served by the Oxford Cambridge Expressway. In March 2021, the then Government cancelled the link between the M1 and the A34 across the M40 without a precise route being declared. is undecided. Locations shown above with an asterisk are on the A421/A428 (M1 to M11/A14) route, which is already expressway standard.

== See also ==
- England's Economic Heartland – English subnational transport body
- M4 Corridor – Motorway-adjacent area in England and Wales
- Silicon Fen – Name given to hi-tech businesses in Cambridge, England
- Thames Gateway – Area around the Thames Estuary, London
- Varsity Line – Oxford–Cambridge railway (1845–1967)
