= Oxbridge reject =

Someone who has been rejected by the University of Oxford and Cambridge

An Oxbridge reject is someone who has been rejected from either the University of Oxford or the University of Cambridge. The term Oxbridge is a portmanteau of Oxford and Cambridge.

The term has received some criticism for its derogatory and elitist nature. Eric Thomas, vice-chancellor of Bristol University, has criticised it because of the way in which it makes people view British higher education through an Oxbridge prism.

== In literature ==
The Oxbridge Reject Society Prospectus is a satirical book by Daniel Goodhart and Murray Buesst purporting to represent a society for people who have been rejected by the two elite universities.
