= Oxford–Cambridge Expressway =

Proposed M1-M40-A34 link in England

The Oxford to Cambridge Expressway was a proposed grade-separated dual carriageway between the A34 near Oxford and the A14 near Cambridge, via (or near) Milton Keynes. The road would have provided an outer orbital route around London, as well as connecting major growth areas in the region.

In March 2020, the Department for Transport announced that the proposal was being "paused" indefinitely, and the road was cancelled by Transport Secretary Grant Shapps in March 2021, as analysis showed that its costs would exceed its benefits.

== Background ==
The case for the road was examined in a Strategic Study for the Cambridge – Milton Keynes – Oxford corridor, published by National Infrastructure Commission in November 2016. The NIC saw the road as being of national strategic importance by providing an outer orbital route around London, linking Southampton, the M3, M4, M40, M1, A1, A14/M11 and Felixstowe. Alongside its report, the Commission sponsored a contest to encourage suggestions for how urban spaces may be developed along the proposed route.

Government spokesman have said that the Cambridge – Milton Keynes – Oxford corridor is one of the most significant growth areas in the country. Local authorities within the corridor are planning for substantial job and housing growth to support the continued economic development of the region. However, there is currently poor east-west connectivity, resulting in Oxford and Cambridge having better connections to London than either to each other or to major settlements between. In his Budget speech in Autumn 2017, Philip Hammond referred to the plan and declared it was the Government's intention "to create a dynamic new growth corridor for the 21st century". The proposal is opposed by councils in Oxfordshire (see Criticism)

== Route and costs ==
As of September 2018, most of the eastern half (A14 to M1) of the route already existed. (Note: Designated as the A428 from the A14 to the A1 and the A421 from the A1 to the M1. Apart from an approximately 10 miles (16 km) section between Caxton Gibbet and the A1, the A428 is already to expressway standard. The A421 between the A1 and the M1 at J13 is also to this standard. On 18 February 2019, Highways England announced final route selection to replace the single-carriageway section from Caxton Gibbet to the A1, with construction to begin in 2022.) However, the route for the western half, from the A34 near Oxford to the A421 east of Milton Keynes, had yet to be decided. The National Infrastructure Commission (NIC) was instructed by Government to evaluate options in order to identify the spatial areas on which further detailed assessments, including further engineering studies, a Strategic Environmental Assessment (SEA) and a Habitats Regulation Assessment (HRA).

The three broad corridor options that were considered by the NIC are shown in outline form on page 39 of the Oxford to Cambridge Expressway Strategic Study: Stage 3 Report. These covered the route from Cambridge to the M40:

- Option A: a northerly corridor (the existing A421 corridor to the A43 then M40 and A34),
- Option B: a (new) central corridor parallel with East West Rail, and
- Option C: a new southern corridor along the A418 corridor, bypassing Aylesbury to the north, and meeting the M40 at or near Junction 7 or 8.

In August 2017 the engineering consultancy Jacobs was awarded a £15m contract to examine these options. All three broad corridors begin at M1 J13, where the expressway currently (2018) ends.

In addition, two alternative corridors are shown around Oxford, one to the north (which may or may not be the current A34 route through Botley, though the report notes the current air-quality issue there) and another to the south between the M40 at J7 or J8 and the A34 just north of Abingdon.

In September 2018, the Government announced the selection of Option B, though the options west of the M40, for connection to the A34 north or south of Oxford, remained unclear. Although the broad corridor had been selected, no decision on the route of the Expressway was to be made "until summer 2019" after a full environmental and ecological impact assessment. In reality, no such decision was announced and, in its Road Investment Strategy 2 (2020–2025), the Department for Transport announced in March 2020 that it had "paused" work on plans east of the M1.

Early estimates of the cost of completing the expressway were in the region of £3 billion.

== Consultation ==
In April 2018, Oxfordshire County Council submitted its preliminary response to Highways England. Stakeholder consultations with local authorities, environmental and ecological groups, and residents associations were held throughout 2018. A wider public consultation on the route options was planned for 2019 and 2020.

== New towns along the route ==
In an interview in The Sunday Times in March 2018, Sajid Javid, the housing secretary, said that he would give the go-ahead to at least two new towns along the corridor "in the next few weeks" and could push for up to three more. As of March 2020, these announcements had not materialised.

== Development of land adjacent to Expressway ==
The National Infrastructure Commission launched a two-stage ideas contest in June 2017 in support of the project with the objective of encouraging a wide range of bodies to put forward suggestions about how the urban space alongside the route could be used. In December 2017, the Commission announced that the winning submission was that proposed by Tibbalds Planning and Urban Design, The proposal was based on cycle and pedestrian transport and the worked example suggested a cluster of villages around Winslow, Buckinghamshire, which is on the East West Rail Link rather than the Expressway (though probably easily accessible from it).

== Criticism ==
On Tuesday 12 December 2017, Oxfordshire County Council debated a motion criticising the process by which Highways England would select a route, with no opportunity for members of the public or their representatives to comment on the need for the road or the local impact of any particular proposed route. The motion called for a Public Enquiry into the proposal, giving everyone involved the opportunity to have their views properly taken into account. The motion was carried by 49 votes to 5, with one abstention. On Tuesday 2 April 2019 the Council passed a further motion demanding that a fuller consultation is carried out asking local residents if they want an Expressway and associated construction before any route is considered. On Tuesday 5 November 2019 the County Council passed a further motion stating "Oxfordshire does not support the building of the Expressway irrespective of which route is chosen."

On 18 July 2019 South Oxfordshire District Council passed a motion opposing the Expressway. The Campaign to Protect Rural England has said that the favoured route that passes through the green belt is unnecessary and would encourage expansion of Oxford. The Oxford Times reported that an action group had been formed to demand a public consultation. This was followed by a poster campaign in April 2018.

Keith Taylor, a Green MEP for the South East, said that the lack of a potential public consultation of the proposed road breached international environmental law. He made further criticisms after visiting Oxford. George Monbiot, writing in The Guardian, claimed the Expressway and associated conurbation would irrevocably change Oxfordshire and that there had been no public debate.

The September 2018 announcement was described as "a monumental disaster and a dagger stabbing at the heart of Oxfordshire" in an Oxford Mail article. On 3 October 2018 the Oxfordshire Growth Board wrote to Government demanding clarity with regard to the choice of route and funding.

== Cancellation ==
In March 2020, the Department for Transport announced that it was "pausing" (but not cancelling) work on the segment of the Expressway between the M1 and the M40 as part of the RIS2 Strategic Roads Network strategy. The same report lists work on the last remaining section of the segment between the A1 and the M11/A14 (A428 Black Cat to Caxton Gibbet) as "committed".

In March 2021, the road was cancelled by Transport Secretary Grant Shapps, who said that analysis had shown it would be poor value for money. His Department reported that feasibility studies for the expressway had cost £28m of public money.
