= Julia Prescot =

British businesswoman (born 1959)

Julia Elizabeth Prescot CBE (born February 1959) is a businesswoman who serves as the Deputy Chair of the National Infrastructure Commission in the United Kingdom.

She is the co-founder of Meridiam, and is the Chair of NeuConnect, Chair of Fulcrum Infrastructure Group, and Non-Executive Director of Allego.

== Career ==
In 2023, Prescot was appointed the Deputy Chair of the National Infrastructure Commission after her 5-year service as a Commissioner. She is Chair of NeuConnect, a new energy interconnector under construction between the UK and Germany. The project reached financial close in July, 2022. Construction work started in July, 2023 with the project due to be completed in 2028.

Prescot serves as a member of the UK Government's Investment Council, which was created to enhance UK inward investment and to provide a forum for global investors to offer advice to Ministers and wider Government.

In September 2023, the UK's Foreign Secretary appointed Prescot to the Board of Wilton Park, an executive agency of the UK Foreign, Commonwealth & Development Office.

Prescot is the co-chair of the World Bank's Global Infrastructure Facility (GIF) Advisory Council.

Prescot is the Deputy Chair of the Port of Tyne, one of the UK's most important deep-sea ports handling cargo across five continents.

Gender equality

Prescot is the National Infrastructure Commission's lead Commissioner for Diversity and Inclusion, arguing the sector needs to be more inclusive and diverse so infrastructure can better reflect the needs of those who use it.

Prescot was the co-founder of the Women Leaders in Infrastructure Group. In 2023 she established The Prescot Scholarship for Women in Leadership for Infrastructure and Construction with University College London, aimed at creating new opportunities for women in the industry.

Education

Prescot has an MA in Archeology, University of Cambridge, and is an Honorary Professor at the Bartlett School of Sustainable Construction, University College London, supporting the development of education in infrastructure finance.
