= John Armitt =

English civil engineer

Sir John Armitt CBE, FREng
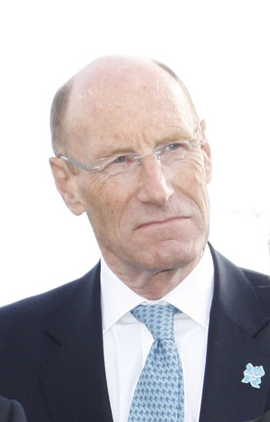
- Armitt in 2010

Chair of the National Infrastructure Commission
- In office 19 January 2018 – 1 April 2025
- Appointed by: Philip Hammond
- Preceded by: The Lord Adonis
- Succeeded by: Position abolished

Deputy Chair of the National Infrastructure Commission
- In office 21 April 2017 – 19 January 2018; Interim: 5 October 2015 – 21 April 2017
- Appointed by: George Osborne; Philip Hammond
- Chair: The Lord Adonis
- Preceded by: Office created
- Succeeded by: Julia Prescot (2023)

Personal details
- Born: John Alexander Armitt; 2 February 1946 (age 80) Edmonton, London, England
- Education: Portsmouth University; London Business School
- Occupation: Chairman, National Infrastructure Commission

Sir John Alexander Armitt (born 2 February 1946) is an English civil engineer, and the final chairman of the UK's National Infrastructure Commission.

From 2007 Armitt was chairman of the Olympic Delivery Authority, the body which organised the building of the venues, facilities and infrastructure for the 2012 Olympic Games. He was president of the Institution of Civil Engineers for 2015–16, and was president of the Smeatonian Society of Civil Engineers for 2022.

He was chairman of the Council of the City and Guilds of London Institute from 2012 to 2021, He was chairman of the Engineering and Physical Sciences Research Council from 2007 until 2012. He was chairman of National Express from January 2013 until December 2022.

He was in post when the last fatality of a passenger on a rail service prior to Stonehaven in 2020 - which occurred in 2007 at Grayrigg - which was later proved to be caused by engineering and testing failures by Network Rail.

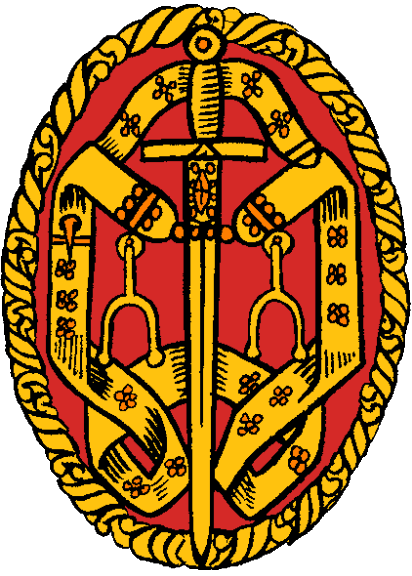
Insignia of Knight Bachelor

== Early life ==
Armitt was born in February 1946 in North London. He attended Portsmouth Northern Grammar School. He graduated in civil engineering from the Portsmouth College of Technology in 1966 and took his first job with John Laing.

== Career ==
Armitt spent 27 years with John Laing, on various projects including the Sizewell B nuclear power station rising to become the chairman of Laing's International and Civil Engineering Divisions.

In 1993, he was appointed chief executive of Union Railways, the company responsible for implementing the Channel Tunnel rail link. From 1997 to 2001, he was chief executive of Costain Group, which he converted from an annual loss of £62 million to a profit of £6.5 million. In 2001 he became chief executive of Railtrack, and from 2002 to 2007 its successor, Network Rail,

During his time at Network Rail he was believed by a survey sponsored by The Sunday Times to be the highest-paid public-sector employee in the UK. Armitt's salary and bonus of £878,000 – rising to more than £1m when pension contributions are included, overtaking Adam Crozier, chief executive of Royal Mail.

On 2 November 2012 the Government announced that Armitt would be a member of the Airports Commission. He is a non executive director of the Berkeley Group and was a Transport for London board member from 2012 to 2016.

The Armitt Review, an independent review of long-term UK infrastructure planning, was published in September 2013, and is Labour Party policy. He was appointed to the National Infrastructure Commission in 2015, became deputy chairman in 2017 and was appointed chairman in 2018. In January 2023, his appointment as chairman was renewed for a further two years, through to January 2025. In October 2024, his term was extended by a further six months to oversee development of a 10-year strategy and the creation of the NIC's successor, the National Infrastructure and Service Transformation Authority (NISTA).

Also in January 2023, he was appointed as a non-executive director of Tilbury Douglas's parent company, TD Bidco, owned and controlled by shareholders of Interserve. He also was a Commissioner of the National Preparedness Commission.

== Recognition ==
Armitt was appointed Commander of the Order of the British Empire (CBE) in the 1996 Birthday Honours for services to the rail industry. In July 2007, Network Rail named New Measurement Train power car 43062 after him at London Euston. He is a Fellow of the Royal Academy of Engineering and of the Institution of Civil Engineers.

He was knighted in the 2012 New Years Honours List for services to engineering and construction as chairman of the Olympic Delivery Authority. His knighthood was criticised by the family of a victim of the Grayrigg derailment, as Armitt had been chief executive of Network Rail at the time of the 2007 accident. Network Rail were prosecuted for the incident on the same day that Armitt's knighthood was conferred.

Professional and academic associations
Preceded by David Balmforth	President of the Institution of Civil Engineers; November 2015 – November 2016	Succeeded by Tim Broyd
