= National Infrastructure and Service Transformation Authority =

UK Government executive agency

Public agency overview
- Formed: 1 April 2025
- Preceding Public agency: National Infrastructure Commission, Infrastructure and Projects Authority
- Jurisdiction: United Kingdom
- Employees: 240
- Minister responsible: James Murray, Chief Secretary to the Treasury
- Public agency executives: Becky Wood, chief executive; James Bowler, principal accounting officer
- Parent Public agency: HM Treasury & Cabinet Office
- Website: www.gov.uk/government/organisations/national-infrastructure-and-service-transformation-authority/

The National Infrastructure and Service Transformation Authority (NISTA), established in April 2025, is a public agency advising the UK Government on infrastructure delivery and improvement. A joint unit of HM Treasury and the Cabinet Office, it combines the functions of the former National Infrastructure Commission and the Infrastructure and Projects Authority.

== History ==
In May 2024, ahead of the 2024 United Kingdom general election, the Labour Party announced plans to merge the National Infrastructure Commission with the Infrastructure and Projects Authority in order to speed up the delivery of major infrastructure projects in the UK. Plans were also announced to create a 10-year National Infrastructure Strategy. These recommendations were drawn from Labour's Major Capital Projects Review, led by Paul Addison, who at the time was working with the engineering company Arup.

In October 2024, the Labour Chancellor of the Exchequer Rachel Reeves convened the inaugural meeting of the British Infrastructure Taskforce, with representatives of major financial companies in attendance, to build business confidence in UK infrastructure investments and start development of a ten-year infrastructure strategy, to be supported by NISTA. In December 2024, HM Treasury started the process of recruiting NISTA's first chief executive, a £200,000-a-year role leading a team of around 240 civil servants and advising on "the improvement of quality, cost, schedule, performance and project outcomes".

In January 2025, it was confirmed that NISTA would be established in April 2025 and would be a joint unit of HM Treasury and the Cabinet Office, with Chief Secretary to the Treasury Darren Jones as the responsible minister, and Treasury permanent secretary James Bowler as principal accounting officer. After a September 2025 reshuffle, Jones was replaced as responsible minister by his successor as chief secretary, James Murray.

NISTA was launched on 1 April 2025, with the commissioners of the abolished National Infrastructure Commission forming a Council of Expert Advisors, chaired initially by Sir John Armitt, and with Jean-Christophe Gray as interim chief executive. The Treasury said a permanent chief executive would be appointed "shortly", and on 16 April it announced Becky Wood would take office as CEO in June 2025. The Treasury and the Cabinet Office were reported to be working on a memorandum of understanding regarding the relationship between NISTA and the two departments.

In June 2025, the UK Government launched its 10-year UK Infrastructure Strategy, prepared by NISTA, setting out a long-term investment plan for infrastructure involving at least £725bn of government funding over the coming decade.

In June 2026, CEO Becky Wood told MPs that around 14% of staff, including a director, had left NISTA in its first 15 months, taking advantage of a "voluntary-exit programme".
