= Infrastructure UK =

Infrastructure UK (IUK) was a division of HM Treasury within the Treasury's Public Services and Growth Directorate, which advised the UK government on the long-term infrastructure needs of the UK and provided commercial expertise to support major projects and programmes between 2010 and 2016.

On 1 January 2016, it was merged with Major Projects Authority to form the Infrastructure and Projects Authority, which reports both to HM Treasury and the Cabinet Office.

Its chief executive was Geoffrey Spence.

== Infrastructure costs ==
The June 2010 Budget announced that Infrastructure UK was to carry out an investigation into the potential for cost reduction in relation to the delivery of civil engineering works for major infrastructure projects, with a mandate to report by the end of 2010. The investigation undertaken between August and December 2010 was led by Infrastructure UK in collaboration with wider government, the Institution of Civil Engineers and relevant industry partners.

== Advisory Council ==
Infrastructure UK had an advisory council which met every quarter. In addition to the non-executive chair Paul Skinner (former chair of Rio Tinto), the council was composed of the following members, which included private sector representatives:

- Sir Nicholas Macpherson, permanent secretary, HM Treasury
- John Kingman, 2nd permanent secretary, HM Treasury
- Philip Rutnam, permanent secretary, DFT
- Martin Donnelly, permanent secretary, BIS
- Bronwyn Hill, permanent secretary, Defra
- Peter Schofield, director general for Neighbourhoods, DCLG
- Simon Virley, director general for Energy & Markets Infrastructure Group, DECC
- Chris Bolt, independent consultant
- Keith Clarke, chairman, Forum for the Future
- Cressida Hogg, managing partner Infrastructure, 3i
- Ian Tyler, former chief executive, Balfour Beatty
- James Cameron, chairman, Climate Change Capital
- Professor Sir Keith Burnett, vice chancellor, University of Sheffield
- Steve Holliday, chief executive, National Grid

== See also ==
- Infrastructure Planning Commission
- Partnerships UK
- Planning Inspectorate
