= National Infrastructure Commission =

Executive agency in the United Kingdom

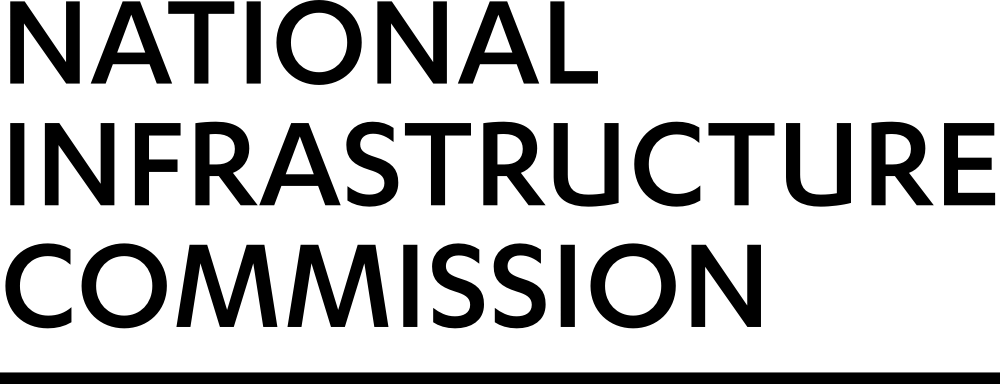

Executive agency overview
- Formed: 5 October 2015 in interim form 24 January 2017 (as an executive agency of HM Treasury)
- Dissolved: 1 April 2025
- Jurisdiction: United Kingdom
- Annual budget: £5.7m
- Minister responsible: Rachel Reeves, Chancellor
- Executive agency executives: Sir John Armitt, Chairman; James Heath, Chief executive; Jonathan Saks, Chief economist
- Parent Executive agency: HM Treasury
- Website: www.nic.org.uk

The National Infrastructure Commission was an executive agency responsible for providing expert advice to the UK Government on infrastructure challenges facing the UK, between 2015 and April 2025, when it was superseded by the National Infrastructure and Service Transformation Authority (NISTA).

Inaugurated in 2015, and established as an executive agency of HM Treasury in January 2017, one of the Commission's main tasks was to undertake a national infrastructure assessment during each Parliament. It also undertook studies in specific areas of infrastructure. The Commission made recommendations to the government, and monitored the government's progress on infrastructure.

The commission instigated a series of reports into the UK energy market, improving transport within the London area, improving connectivity across the North of England, seeking to make the UK a world leader in 5G deployment, using technology to improve infrastructure productivity, addressing England's water supply challenges, and adapting the UK freight networks to meet growing demands for fast deliveries, among others.

== Purpose and history ==
The Commission was the body responsible for providing independent analysis and advice to the Government to ensure the UK meets its long-term infrastructure needs. Its role was to support sustainable economic growth across all regions of the UK, improve competitiveness, and improve quality of life. It was established in October 2015. Chancellor George Osborne appointed Lord Adonis as interim chairman. In January 2017 the Commission was established as an executive agency of HM Treasury. In April 2017, Lord Adonis and Sir John Armitt were confirmed as the first permanent chair and deputy chair respectively, and four new commissioners (Dame Kate Barker, David Fisk, Andy Green and Julia Prescot) were appointed. Lord Adonis resigned in December 2017 citing concerns over Brexit and was replaced by former deputy chair, Sir John Armitt. Barker stepped down as a commissioner in March 2020, and Fisk stepped down in April 2022.

In May 2024, ahead of the 2024 United Kingdom general election, the Labour Party announced plans to merge the Commission with the Infrastructure and Projects Authority in order to speed up the delivery of major infrastructure projects in the UK. The new body would be called the National Infrastructure and Service Transformation Authority (NISTA). In October 2024, Armitt's chairmanship was extended by six months to oversee development of a 10-year strategy and NISTA's creation. NISTA was established on 1 April 2025 as a joint unit of the Treasury and Cabinet Office, with Darren Jones as the responsible minister.

== Structure ==
=== Commissioners ===
As of 21 August 2022.

- Sir John Armitt – serves as chair (to July 2025)
- Professor Sir Tim Besley (five-year appointment confirmed in September 2020)
- Neale Coleman (appointed in September 2020; five-year reappointment confirmed in April 2022)
- Michèle Dix (appointed in October 2023)
- Andy Green (five-year reappointment confirmed in April 2022)
- Professor Jim Hall (appointed in April 2022)
- Sadie Morgan (five-year appointment confirmed in September 2020)
- Julia Prescot (five-year reappointment confirmed in April 2022; appointed deputy chair in January 2023 through to January 2027)
- Kate Willard (appointed in April 2022)
- Nick Winser (appointed in April 2022)

=== Secretariat ===
The commissioners were supported by about 40 people who worked in the secretariat, made up of civil servants, including economists and policy generalists, as well as secondees from industry.

== Activities ==
=== National Infrastructure Assessment ===
One of the NIC's main tasks was to undertake a national infrastructure assessment each parliament, making recommendations to the Government and then hold the Government to account on implementation. The Assessment looked at the UK’s future economic infrastructure needs up to 2050 and made recommendations for how to deliver new transport, low carbon energy and digital networks, how to recycle more and waste less, and how future infrastructure should be paid for. It aimed to ensure the UK is prepared for the technological advances that will change how the country operates. The first National Infrastructure Assessment was published in July 2018, and the second was published in October 2023.

=== Studies and reports ===
The commission published reports on infrastructure in the UK as well as recommendations for its improvement.

==== Smart Power (March 2016) ====
The first report, published in March 2016, looked into the UK energy market, exploring how supply and demand can better be balanced as well as making recommendations for future infrastructure programmes.

==== Transport for a World City (March 2016) ====
The second report explored options for improving transport within and around the London area and strongly advocated the construction of Crossrail 2 as its main proposal.

==== High Speed North (March 2016) ====
This report explored options for improving connectivity across the North of England. Options include High Speed 3, upgrades to the motorway network, investment in conventional railways and a new Trans-pennine Tunnel.

==== Connected Future (December 2016) ====
Connected Future explored what the UK needed to do to become a world leader in 5G deployment and take early advantage of the potential applications of 5G services. The commission found that Britain was 54th in the world for 4G and that the UK government and the communications regulator, Ofcom, needed to ensure that essential outdoor mobile services, such as basic, text and data use, were available all across the UK. In anticipation of 5G, the UK had to improve mobile connectivity on railways, roads and in towns and cities.

==== Data for the Public Good (December 2017) ====
In November 2016, the government asked the commission to conduct a new study on how technology can improve infrastructure productivity. The study was published in December 2017.

==== Preparing for a drier future (April 2018) ====
Published ahead of the National Infrastructure Assessment, this study set out the Commission’s advice on how to address England’s water supply challenges and deliver the appropriate level of resilience for the long term.

==== Better Delivery: the challenge for freight (April 2019) ====
This study identified actions to enable UK’s freight networks to meet growing demands for fast deliveries and reduce their impact on congestion and the environment.

==== Strategic investment and public confidence (October 2019) ====
In October 2018, the government asked the Commission to conduct a new study into regulation of the UK's energy, telecoms and water industries, to ensure the necessary levels of investment and innovation. The study report, Strategic investment and public confidence, was published in October 2019, and said the UK's regulatory system must "adapt to meet the demands of the future" by providing regulators such as Ofgem with new powers to ensure utility investments in sustainable infrastructure. Without such powers, it said the UK would be unlikely to meet its zero emissions target by 2050.

==== Resilient infrastructure systems (May 2020) ====
The study considered what action government should take to ensure that the UK’s infrastructure can cope with future changes, disruptions, shocks and accidents. It looked at how resilience can be assessed and improved, including through better design and application of new technologies. The report, Anticipate, React, Recover: Resilient infrastructure systems, prescribed a new framework to help support change across infrastructure sectors; it called for transparent standards of appropriate service levels, stress testing for major incidents and clearer direction for utilities providers to invest in long-term resilience.

==== Rail Needs Assessment for the Midlands and the North (December 2020) ====
This NIC report set out options for a programme of rail investments in the Midlands and the North, using five packages and three different illustrative budget options.
