= August 26 (Eastern Orthodox liturgics) =

Day in the Eastern Orthodox liturgical calendar

Eastern Orthodox liturgical calendar
August 25	August 26	August 27
August 26 O.S. ≍ September 8 N.S. August 26 N.S ≍ August 13 O.S.

An Eastern Orthodox cross

August 26 in Eastern Orthodox liturgical calendars is a feast day and a day of commemoration of saints and martyrs. Although some Orthodox churches use the Revised Julian Calendar and others use the traditional Julian calendar, the fixed commemorations for their respective August 26 are broadly the same, no matter which calendar is used. (Note: Despite the dates being the same, the days to which they refer typically differ by 13 days. The notation Old Style or O.S. is sometimes used to indicate a date in the traditional Julian Calendar (the "Old Calendar"). The notation New Style or N.S. indicates a date in the Revised Julian calendar (the "New Calendar").)

== Saints ==
- Martyrs Adrian and Natalia of Nicomedia, and 23 companions (306) (Note: (in Greek) Τὰ ὀνόματα τοὺς εἶναι: Ἀνατόλιος, Ἄνθιμος, Ἀντίοχος, Γεντήλιος, Ἐλευθέριος, Ἐρμογένης, Εὐήθιος, Εὐρετός, Εὐτύχιος, Θεαγώνης, Θεόδωρος, Θῦρσος, Ἰωάννης, Καρτερᾶς, Κλαύδιος, Κυριάκος, Μαρίνος, Μαρδώνιος, Μηνώδιος, Πλάτων, Συνετός, Τρωάδιος καὶ Φαρέτριος († 4ος αἰ.).) (Note: Name days celebrated today include: Adrian (Ἀδριανός); Adrienne (Ἀδριανή); Natalia (Ναταλία).)
- Martyrs Atticus and Sissinius, by the sword.
- Martyr Adrian, son of Roman Emperor Probus, at Nicomedia (320) (Note: "At Nicomedia, the martyrdom of St. Adrian, son of the emperor Probus. For reproaching Licinius on account of the persecution raised against Christians, he was put to death by his order. His body was buried at Argyopolis by his uncle Domitius, bishop of Byzantium.")
- Saint Gelasius.
- Saint Maximus III, Archbishop of Jerusalem (347) (see also: May 9)
- Venerable Tithoes of the Thebaid (4th century), disciple of St. Pachomius the Great. (Note: He is mentioned in the Evergetinos.)
- Monk Ioasaph, Prince of India (4th century) (see also: November 19)
- Venerable Ibestion the Confessor, Egyptian ascetic (c. 450)

== Pre-Schism Western saints ==
- Saint Zephyrinus, Pope of Rome from 199 to 217, who defended Orthodox Christology against heresies (217)
- Martyrs Irenaeus and Abundius (258) (Note: "In the same city, during the persecution of Valerian, the holy martyrs Irenaeus and Abundius, who were thrown into a sewer from which they had taken the body of blessed Concordia. Their bodies were drawn out by the priest Justin, and buried in a crypt near St. Lawrence.") (see also: August 13)
- Saint Secundus, a soldier of the Theban Legion martyred near Ventimiglia in Italy (3rd century)
- Saint Alexander of Bergamo (c. 303) (Note: "At Bergamo, in Lombardy, St. Alexander, martyr, who was one of the same legion, and endured martyrdom by being beheaded for the constant confession of the name of our Lord Jesus Christ.") (Note: Patron of Bergamo in the north of Italy, where a church has been dedicated to him from the fourth century. A later manuscript suggests that he was a centurion of the Theban Legion who escaped from prison but was recaptured.)
- Saint Ninian, Apostle to the Southern Picts (432) (Note: A Briton who was sent to enlighten his native country. He established his mission at Whithorn in Wigtownshire in Scotland, so called because the church was built of stone plastered white. There was a monastery attached to it and it was from this centre that Ninian and his monks enlightened the northern Britons and the Picts.)
- Saint Rufinus, Bishop of Capua (5th century) (Note: His relics are enshrined in the cathedral.)
- Saint Elias of Syracuse, a monk who became Bishop of Syracuse in Sicily (660)
- Saint Felix of Pistoia, a holy hermit in Pistoia in Tuscany in Italy (9th century)
- Saint Pandwyna (Pandionia), a holy virgin born in Ireland (c. 904) (Note: "ST. PANDWYNA, or PANDONIA, was the daughter of a petty prince of Ireland or North Britain, who fled to England to escape the tyranny of her father and the pursuit of those who would have compelled her to abandon her purpose of serving God in the state of holy virginity. She took refuge with a kinswoman of hers, who was prioress of a nunnery at Eltisley in Cambridgeshire. There she led a life of great perfection, and obtained the reputation of eminent sanctity. She was buried near a well, which bears her name, and at a later period her sacred relics were translated to the parish church, which still bears the title of 'St. Pandonia and St. John the Baptist.'")
- Saint Victor (Vitores), a priest in Spain martyred by the Moors in the ninth or tenth century.

== Post-Schism Orthodox saints ==
- Saint Zer-Jacob, missionary of Ethiopia.
- Saint Adrian of Uglich (after 1504), disciple of St. Paisius of Uglich.
- Saint Adrian of Ondrusov, founder of Ondrusov Monastery, Karelia (1549)
- Blessed Cyprian of Storozhev, former outlaw (16th century)
- Saint Maria (Fedina) of Diveyevo, Fool-for-Christ (1931)

=== New martyrs and confessors ===
- New Hieromartyr Peter Levlev, Priest (1918)
- New Confessor George Kossov of Orlov, Archpriest (1928) (Note: See: (in Russian) Коссов, Георгий Алексеевич. Википедии. (Russian Wikipedia).)
- New Hieromartyr Nectarius (Trezvinsky), Bishop of Yaransk (1937)
- New Hiero-confessor Roman Medved of Moscow, Archpriest (1937) (Note: See: (in Russian) Медведь, Роман Иванович. Википедии. (Russian Wikipedia).)
- New Hieromartyr Victor Ellansky, Priest (1937)
- New Martyrs Demetrius Morozov and Peter Bordan (1937)
- New Hieromartyr Christopher Varfolomeev, Archpriest (1938) (Note: According to an article by the Valaam Monastery, he died on September 8, 1938 in the camp hospital. The place of his burial is unknown.) (Note: The official communiqué of the Moscow Patriarchate was as follows: "«Заслушав рапорт Преосвященного епископа Троицкого Панкратия, председателя Синодальной комиссии по канонизации святых, члены Священного Синода постановили одобрить решение о включении имени протоиерея Христофора Варфоломеева и священника Павла Кушникова в Собор новомучеников и исповедников Церкви Русской и включить данный вопрос в повестку дня предстоящего Архиерейского Собора», — сказал В.Р. Легойда.") (Note: See: (in Russian) Варфоломеев, Христофор Иванович. Википедии. (Russian Wikipedia).)

== Other commemorations ==
- Commemoration of the Meeting of the "Vladimir" Icon of the Most Holy Theotokos (1395)
- Icon of the Mother of God "Virgin of Tenderness" of the Pskov Caves (1524). (Note: It is commemorated on May 21, June 23, August 26, October 7, and on the 7th Sunday of Pascha.)
- Finding of the relics (1748) of St. Bassian, Schemamonk of Alatyr Monastery (c. 1698)
- Miraculous Self-Renewal of the Vladimir Icon of the Most Holy Theotokos in the hands of Righteous Abbess Rufina, in Harbin, Manchuria (1925)

== Icon gallery ==
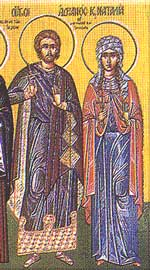
Martyrs Adrian and Natalia of Nicomedia.

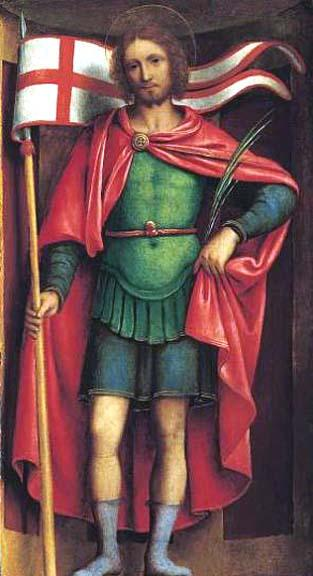
St. Alexander of Bergamo.

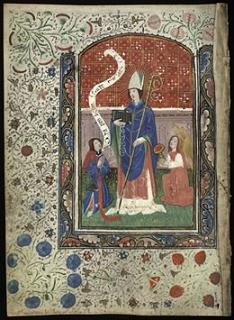
St. Ninian, Apostle to the Southern Picts.

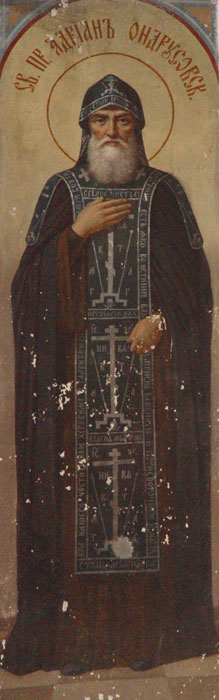
St. Adrian of Ondrusov.

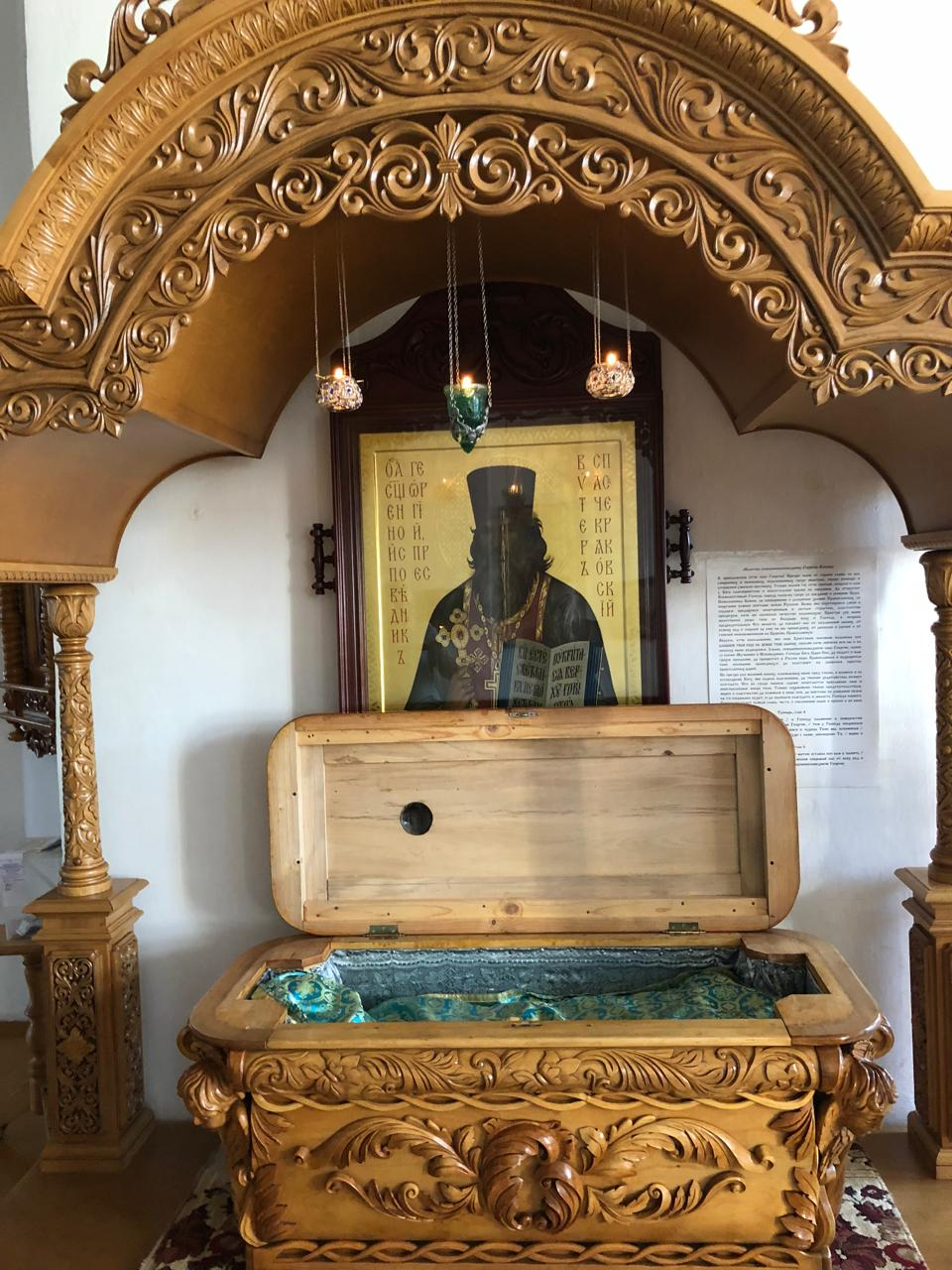
Reliquary with the relics of the Holy Confessor George Kossov of Orlov, Archpriest.

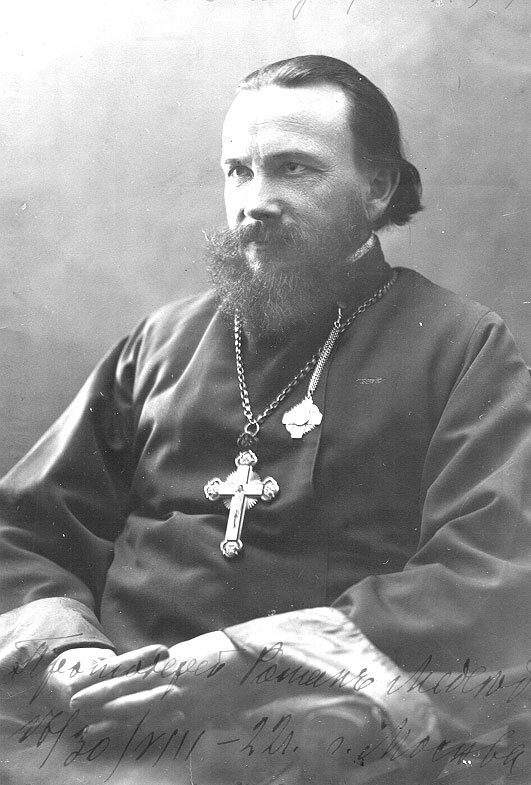
New Hiero-confessor Roman Medved, Archpriest.

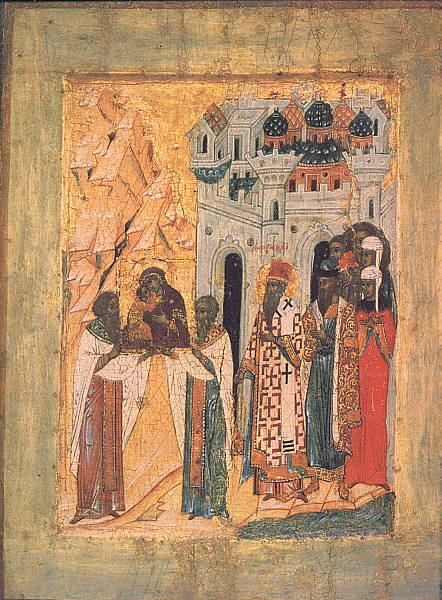
Icon "Meeting (Sretenie) of Vladimirskaya icon"

== Sources ==
- August 26 / September 8. Orthodox Calendar (PRAVOSLAVIE.RU).
- September 8 / August 26. Holy Trinity Russian Orthodox Church (A parish of the Patriarchate of Moscow).
- August 26. OCA - The Lives of the Saints.
- The Autonomous Orthodox Metropolia of Western Europe and the Americas (ROCOR). St. Hilarion Calendar of Saints for the year of our Lord 2004. St. Hilarion Press (Austin, TX). p. 63.
- The Twenty-Sixth Day of the Month of August. Orthodoxy in China.
- August 26. Latin Saints of the Orthodox Patriarchate of Rome.
- The Roman Martyrology. Transl. by the Archbishop of Baltimore. Last Edition, According to the Copy Printed at Rome in 1914. Revised Edition, with the Imprimatur of His Eminence Cardinal Gibbons. Baltimore: John Murphy Company, 1916. pp. 258-259.
- Rev. Richard Stanton. A Menology of England and Wales, or, Brief Memorials of the Ancient British and English Saints Arranged According to the Calendar, Together with the Martyrs of the 16th and 17th Centuries. London: Burns & Oates, 1892. pp. 413-414.

Greek Sources

- Great Synaxaristes: (in Greek) 26 ΑΥΓΟΥΣΤΟΥ. ΜΕΓΑΣ ΣΥΝΑΞΑΡΙΣΤΗΣ.
- (in Greek) Συναξαριστής. 26 Αυγούστου. ECCLESIA.GR. (H ΕΚΚΛΗΣΙΑ ΤΗΣ ΕΛΛΑΔΟΣ).

Russian Sources

- (in Russian) 8 сентября (26 августа). Православная Энциклопедия под редакцией Патриарха Московского и всея Руси Кирилла (электронная версия). (Orthodox Encyclopedia - Pravenc.ru).
