= May 17 (Eastern Orthodox liturgics) =

Day in the Eastern Orthodox liturgical calendar

Eastern Orthodox liturgical calendar
May 16	May 17	May 18
May 17 O.S. ≍ May 30 N.S. May 17 N.S ≍ May 4 O.S.

An Eastern Orthodox cross

May 17 in Eastern Orthodox liturgical calendars is a feast day and a day of commemoration of saints and martyrs. Although some Orthodox churches use the Revised Julian Calendar and others use the traditional Julian calendar, the fixed commemorations for their respective May 17 are broadly the same, no matter which calendar is used. (Note: Despite the dates being the same, the days to which they refer typically differ by 13 days. The notation Old Style or O.S. is sometimes used to indicate a date in the traditional Julian Calendar (the "Old Calendar"). The notation New Style or N.S. indicates a date in the Revised Julian calendar (the "New Calendar").)

== Saints ==
- Apostles Andronicus of Pannonia and his fellow labourer Junia, of the Seventy Apostles (1st century) (Note: The Synaxis of the Seventy Apostles in celebrated on January 4.)
- Martyrs Solochon, Pamphamer, and Pamphalon, soldiers, at Chalcedon (c. 286-305)
- Martyrs Adrion, Victor and Basilla, in Alexandria.
- Saint Theodoret of Antioch, Hieromartyr (361–363)
- Venerable Dodo of the St David-Gareji Monastery, Georgia (6th century) (see also: May 25)
- Saint Stephen the New, Patriarch of Constantinople (893)

== Pre-Schism Western saints ==
- Saint Restituta the martyr, in Carthage (255 or 304)
- Martyrs Heradius, Paul, and Aquilinus, near Lake Geneva (284-305)
- Saint Maden (Madern, Madron, Madrona) (c. 545)
- Saint Cathán (Catan, Chattan, Cadan), Bishop in the Isle of Bute in Scotland (6th century)
- Saint Mailduf (Maidulph, Maelduib), founder of Malmesbury Abbey (673)
- Saint Gerebernus (Gerebern, Gerebrand), Hieromartyr, priest from Ireland who accompanied St Dymphna to Belgium and shared in her martyrdom (7th century)
- Saint Rasso (Ratho), ascetic, founder of a Benedictine abbey at Wörth, later named Grafrath after him (953)

== Post-Schism Orthodox saints ==
- St. Andronicus the Gravedigger, monk of the Zverinets Monastery, Kiev (1096) (Note: See: (in Russian) Архангело-Михайловский Зверинецкий монастырь. Википедии. (Russian Wikipedia).)
- Venerable Eudoxia of Moscow, in monasticism Euphrosyne, Grand-Duchess of Moscow (1407) (see also: July 7)
- Saints Nectarius (1550) and Theophanes (1544) the gate-keepers, brothers, of Meteora.
- Great-martyr Nicholas of Sofia, Bulgaria (1555)
- Saint Nicolas (Basdanis) the New Martyr of Metsovo (St Nicolas the Vlach) (1617) (Note: The Holy Synod of the Ecumenical Patriarchate formally canonized Nicolas Basdanis as a saint of the Universal Church on November 28, 1988. He is commemorated on that date, and on that of his martyrdom - May 17.)
- Saint Athanasius the New, Bishop and Wonderworker of Christianoupolis (1707-1708)
- Saint Jonah Atamansky, Archpriest of Odessa, Wonderworker (1924) (Note: Fr. Jonah, a married priest, did his all-night Akathist vigils daily from midnight to daybreak. His prayers cured the blind and cast out demons from the possessed. When Moscow doctors told an Odessa mother they could do nothing for her son who was born blind, St. Jonah prayed over his bed all night for nine days and on the morning of the tenth day, the boy could see with 20/20 vision. St. Jonah was taken to court by the Bolsheviks but the chief ophthalmologist of Moscow came to his defence. A great man of prayer, he is also highly venerated in Romania and elsewhere.)

== Other commemorations ==
- Commemoration of the Fall of Jerusalem in 614 AD to the Persians, with the loss of the True Cross to Persia, damage to the Church of the Holy Sepulchre by fire, and the martyrdom of over 65,000 Christians (614) (Note: Following the Sassanid King Khosrau II's early 7th-century push into the Byzantine Empire, advancing through Syria, the Sassanid Generals Shahrbaraz and Shahin attacked the Byzantine-controlled city of Jerusalem. They were aided by the Jews of Palestine, who had risen up against the Byzantines. According to the account by the 7th-century monk Antiochus Strategos, Abbott of the Great Lavra of St. Sabbas the Sanctified, the total number of Christian martyrs "was 66,509 souls"; while according to the account in the Great Synaxaristes the total was "80,000" Christian martyrs.)
- Translation of the relics (1551) of Saint Adrian of Ondrusov, founder of Ondrusov Monastery, Karelia (1549)
- Synaxis of the Five Holy Hierarchs of Cytheria on Cyprus (2018): (Note: Established in 2018 with the blessings of the Archbishop Chrysostomos II of Cyprus.)

- Saint Pappos (368) – (October 24)
- Saint Athanasios (4th century) – (May 17)
- Saint Fotinos (5th century) – (August 2)
- Saint Spyridon (8th century) – (September 19)
- Saint Demetrianus (c. 915) – (November 6)

== Icon gallery ==
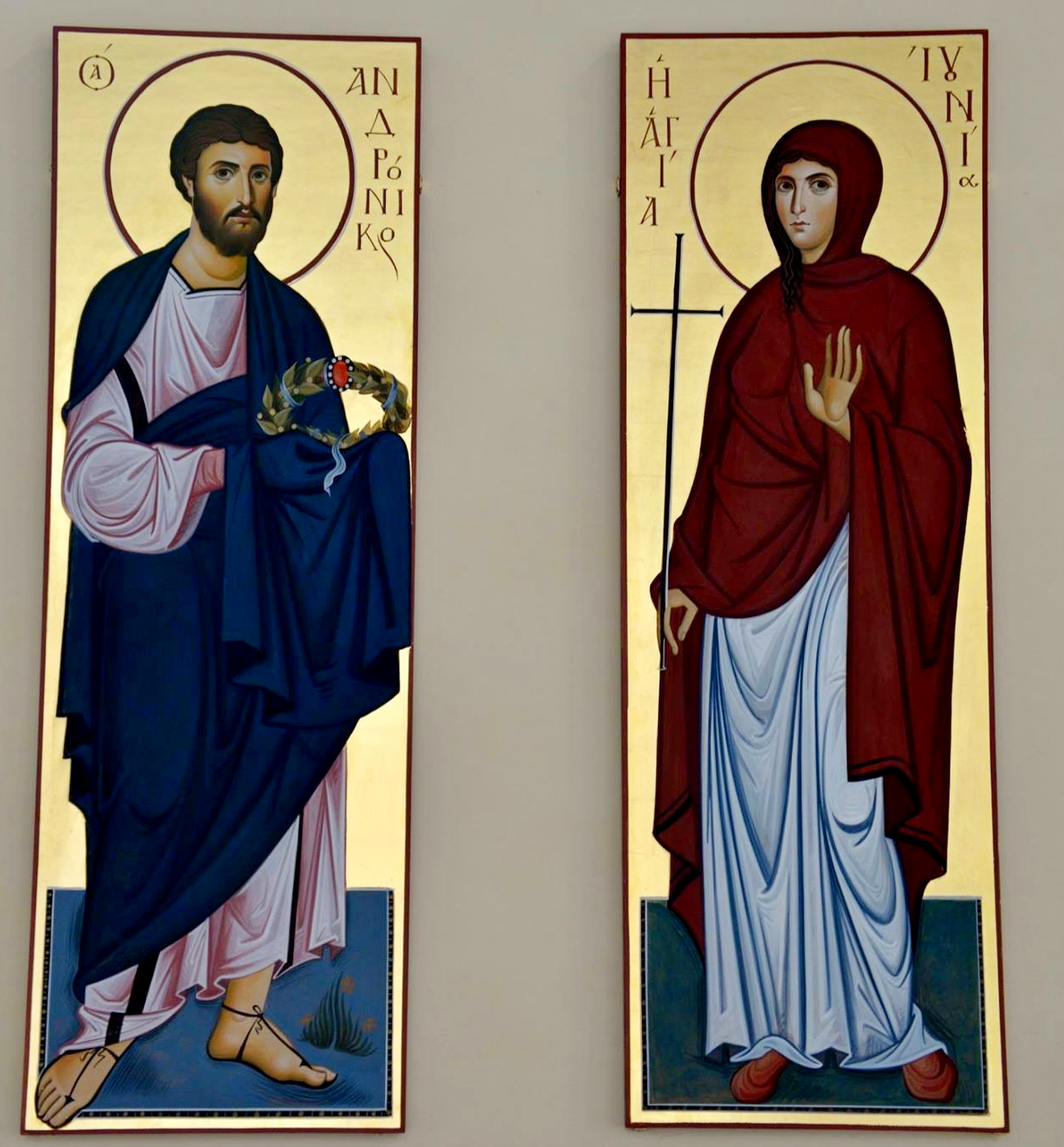
St. Andronicus of Pannonia and St. Junia.

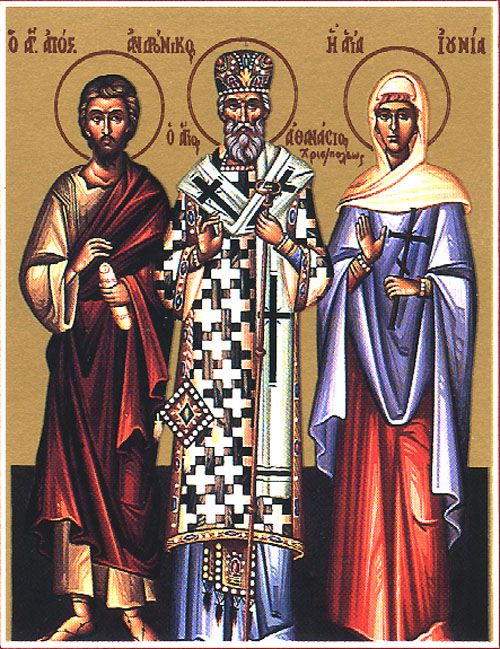
St. Andronicus of Pannonia (left) with St. Junia (right), and St. Athanasius of Christianoupolis (center).

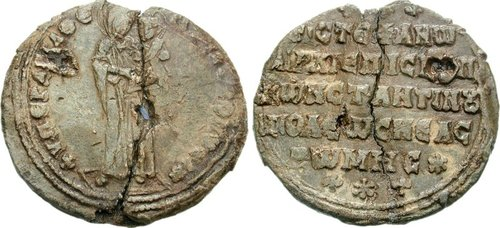
Seal of "Stephen, Patriarch of Constantinople and New Rome" (either of Stephen I or II).

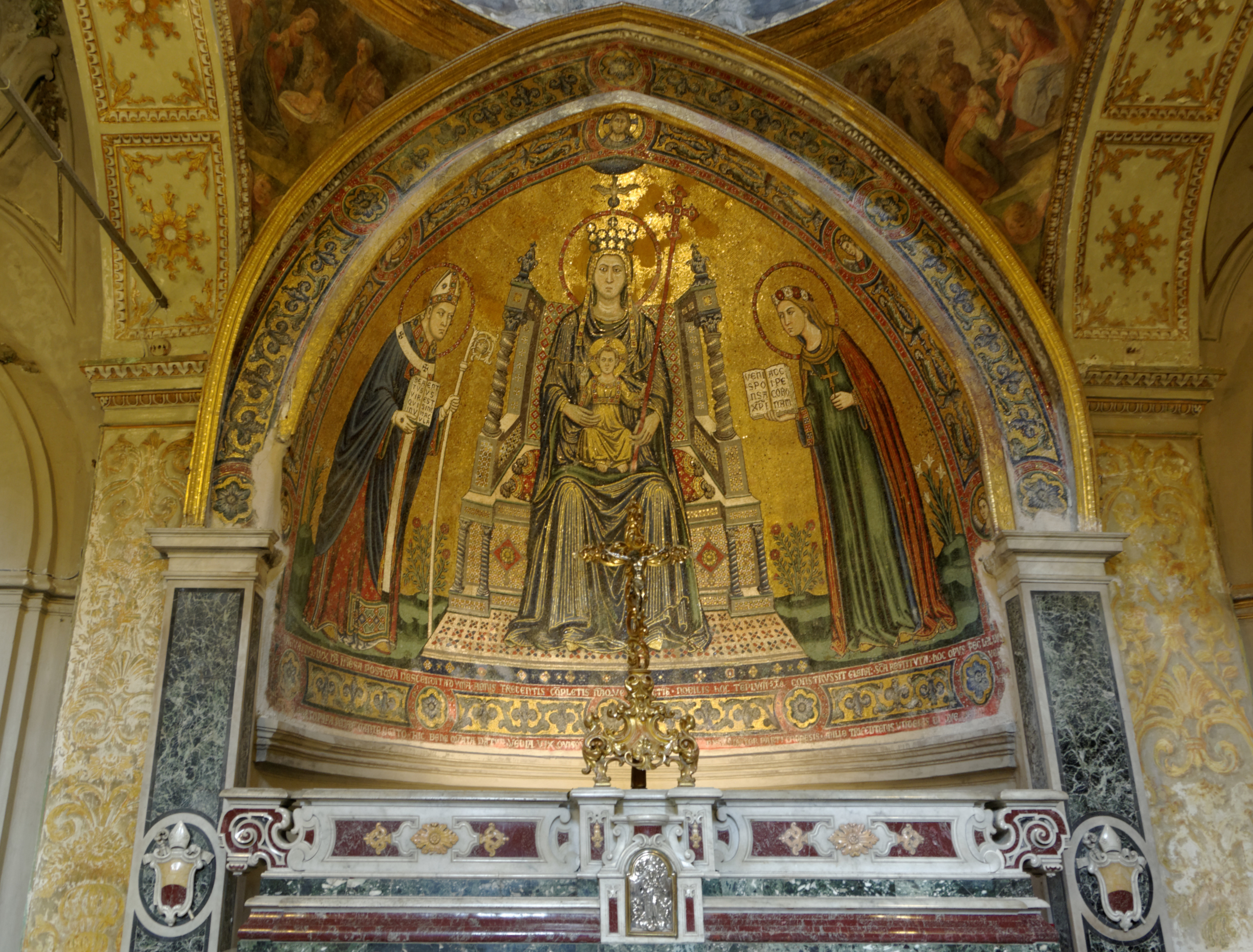
Mosaic of the Theotokos and Christ child, between St. Januarius and St. Restituta (Naples Cathedral - Chapel of St. Restituta).

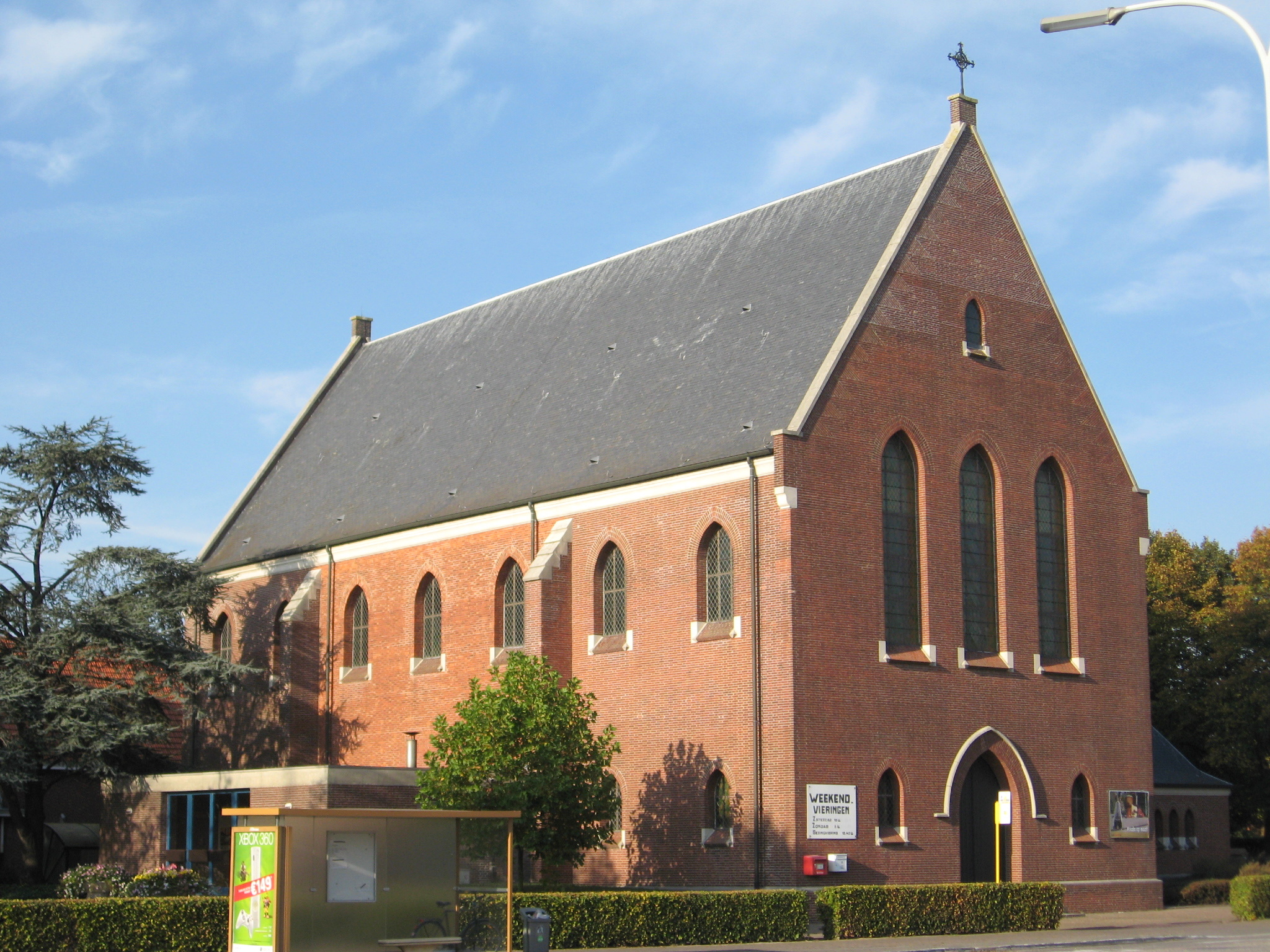
Church of Saint Gerebernus in Punt, Geel, Antwerp, Belgium.

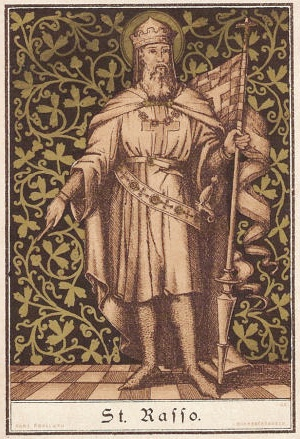
Lithograph of St. Rasso of Andechs.

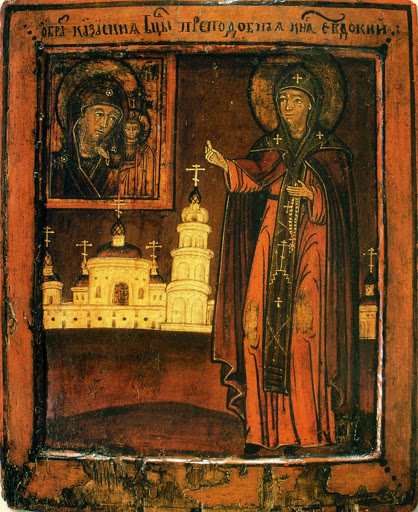
St. Eudoxia (Euphrosyne) of Moscow.

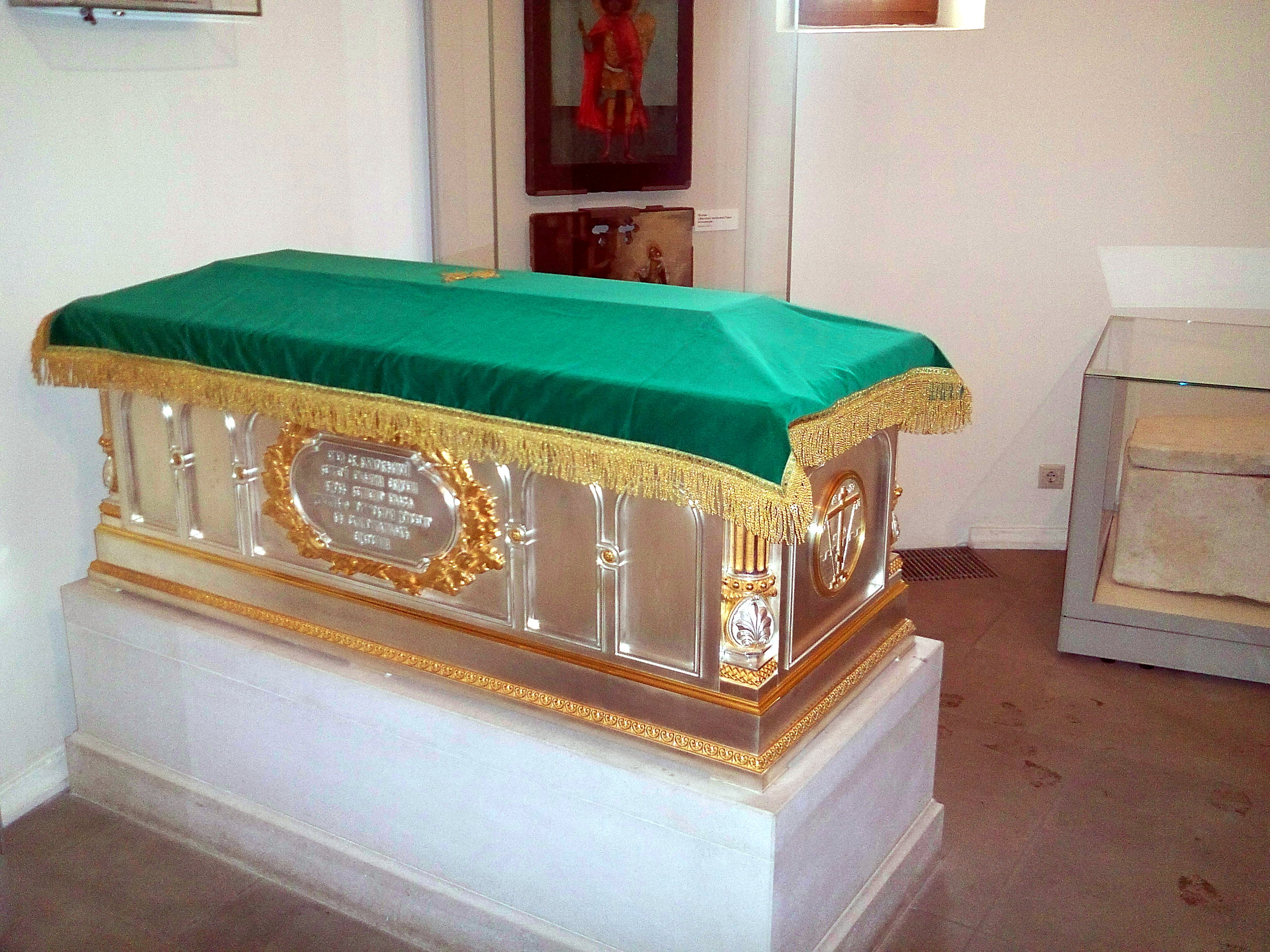
Shrine of St. Eudoxia (Euphrosyne) of Moscow.

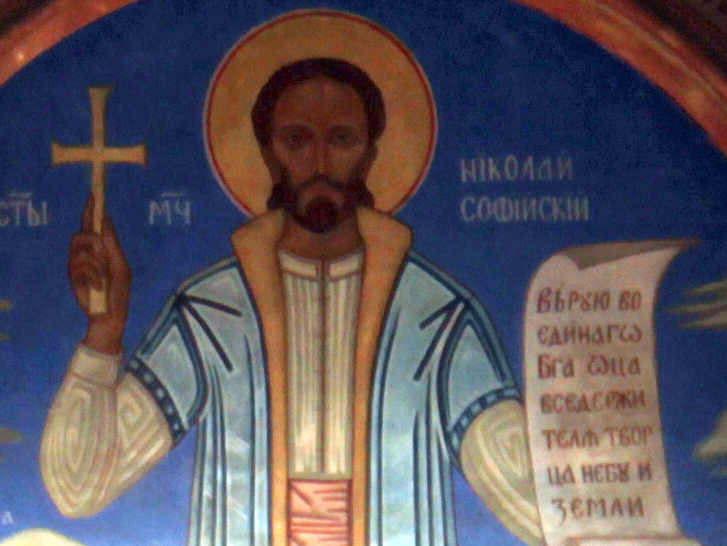
Great-martyr Nicholas of Sofia, Bulgaria.

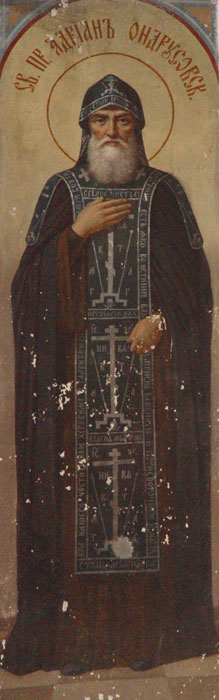
St. Adrian of Ondrusov.

== Sources ==
- May 17/30. Orthodox Calendar (PRAVOSLAVIE.RU).
- May 30 / May 17. HOLY TRINITY RUSSIAN ORTHODOX CHURCH (A parish of the Patriarchate of Moscow).
- May 17. OCA - The Lives of the Saints.
- May 17. Latin Saints of the Orthodox Patriarchate of Rome.
- May 17. The Roman Martyrology.

Greek Sources

- Great Synaxaristes: (in Greek) 17 ΜΑΪΟΥ. ΜΕΓΑΣ ΣΥΝΑΞΑΡΙΣΤΗΣ.
- (in Greek) Συναξαριστής. 17 Μαΐου. ECCLESIA.GR. (H ΕΚΚΛΗΣΙΑ ΤΗΣ ΕΛΛΑΔΟΣ).

Russian Sources

- (in Russian) 30 мая (17 мая). Православная Энциклопедия под редакцией Патриарха Московского и всея Руси Кирилла (электронная версия). (Orthodox Encyclopedia - Pravenc.ru).
- (in Russian) 17 мая (ст.ст.) 30 мая 2013 (нов. ст.). Русская Православная Церковь Отдел внешних церковных связей. (DECR).
