= Henry Denne =

English cleric, theologian, and reformer (1606 – c. 1660)

The Reverend Henry Denne
- Born: 1606; Ickham, Kent, Kingdom of England
- Died: c. 1660 (aged 53–54); Kingdom of England
- Education: Sidney Sussex College (Bachelor of Arts, 1625; Master of Arts, 1628)
- Occupations: Minister; theologian
- Notable work: The Doctrine and Conversation of John Baptist; The Foundation of Children's Baptism

Ordination history
History
Priestly ordination
- Ordained by: Theophilus Field, Bishop of the Diocese of St Davids

Henry Denne (1606 – c. 1660) was an English Puritan cleric of the Church of England, divine (theologian), itinerant preacher, and later, a religious reformer of Baptist views. Denne was a notable preacher and apologist throughout England by propagating baptism of believers only in contrast to the baptism of infants. He was vicar of Eltisley, Cambridgeshire and before that, briefly, elder of Coleman Street General Baptist church, in London. Denne was also sometime soldier for the Parliament and chaplain to Oliver Cromwell in the Civil War.

== Early life ==
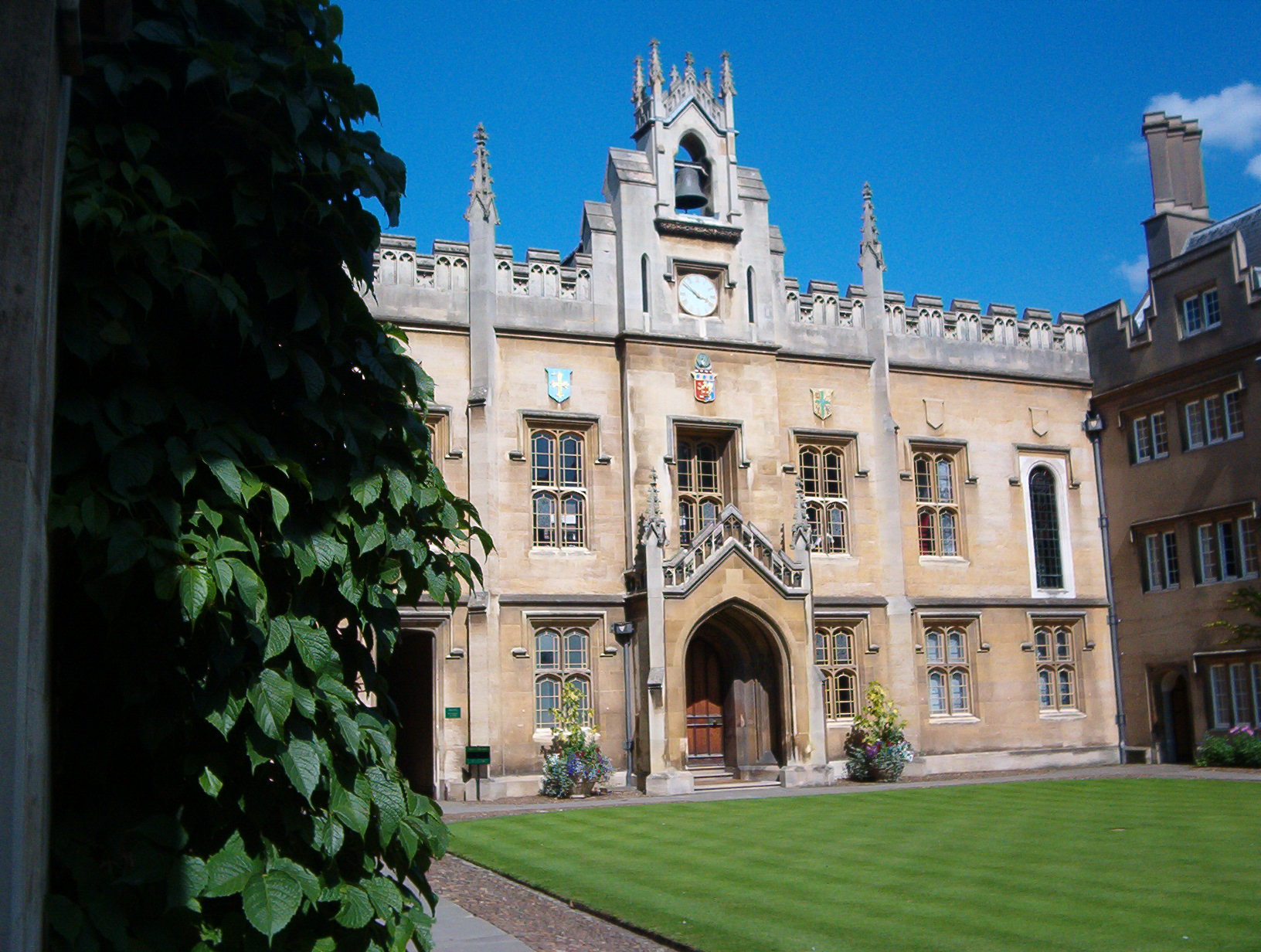
Chapel Court of Sidney Sussex College

Henry Denne was born on 1606 to David Denne in Ickham, county of Kent, in the Kingdom of England, as his youngest son. His father David was a gentleman of Kent. Denne was educated at Latton, Essex, under his uncle Thomas Denne, then vicar of Latton. He was admitted to Cambridge by Thomas, where he was matriculated as a sizar at Sidney Sussex College in May 1621. Denne graduated B.A. in 1625 and M.A. in 1628.

== Ministry ==
In 1630, Denne was ordained in the Church of England by Theophilus Feild, Bishop of St David's, and soon, in 1631, he became curate of Pirton, Hertfordshire, a preaching office he held for about 10 years. Denne's son, John Denne, was baptised on 29 May 1633. In 1641, Denne was selected with other clerics by the committee of the House of Commons for ecclesiastical preferment. He delivered a controversial sermon at Baldock at the visitation held there, giving offence by attacking the vices of the clergy. His sermon was subsequently published as "The Doctrine and Conversation of John Baptist", in 1642, and circulated throughout England.

=== Theological changes ===
Soon after the outbreak of the Civil War, Henry Denne became convinced of the baptism of believers only in contrast with the baptism of infants. Denne went to London and allied with the Baptists, being baptised by immersion into the Coleman Street church, in 1643. He left the office in Pirton, but didn't resign his ordination and preaching license in the Church of England. He was soon chosen to pastorate the church along with Thomas Lambe and Samuel Oates, who "preached universal grace, the Arminian tenets". He continued his ministry preaching in the parish churches throughout England by now persuading to reform on baptism. Denne was considered a "great Arminian" by Thomas Edwards.

His change of opinion regarding baptism brought persecution, and in 1644 he was apprehended in Cambridgeshire, by order of the "committee" of the county, for preaching against infant baptism. After he had lain in Cambridge gaol for a time, his case, through the intercession of friends, was referred to a committee of the House, and he was sent to London, where he was confined in Lord Petre's residence in Aldersgate Street. After his case was investigated, the committee ordered his release. Among his fellow-prisoners was Dr Daniel Featley, an opponent of Baptists, who wrote The Dippers Dipt. His book was brought to Denne's notice.

Shortly after his release, Denne challenged Featley to a disputation. Featley, pleading the danger of publicly disputing without a license, declined to continue with it. Denne then wrote The Foundation of Children's Baptism discovered and rased; an answer to Dr Featley, &c. (1645), which was recognized as a standard authority by the English Baptists.

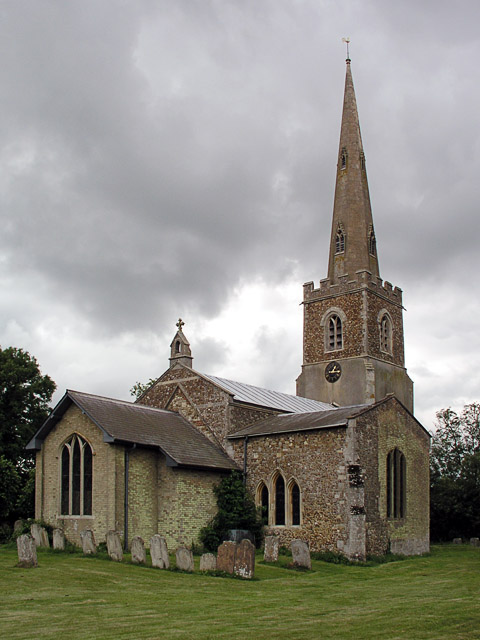
Church of St Pandionia and St John the Baptist, where Henry Denne became parish priest

Afterwards, Denne was appointed to the vicarage of Eltisley, in Cambridgeshire, by the Parliament of England, leaving the pastorate in Coleman Street, and, though opposed both Presbyterians and Prelatists, managed to retain the new office for several years. Denne was appointed to preach a lecture at St Ives, however, the committee of Cambridgeshire endeavoured to prevent him. On being interrupted while preaching, he left the church, and going into a neighbouring churchyard, continued to preach from under a tree to the large crowd.

=== In the Army ===
In June 1646, Denne was apprehended by the magistrates at Spalding, Lincolnshire, for administering a baptism in River Welland, but was released. He was, however, persecuted by neighbouring ministers. Denne, then, temporarily resigned his living and became a soldier and chaplain to the Parliament's army. There, he gained a ‘great reputation’ for zeal and courage. At the conclusion of the Civil War, he returned to his ecclesiastical office. He went to Canterbury in 1655.

== Later life ==
In 1658, Denne held a public dispute, lasting two days, concerning infant baptism with Peter Gunning in St Clement Danes church.

In 1660, Denne published an open letter addressing criticisms to the violation of freedom of conscience in the prisons of England. He died in the same year.

== Works ==
Although a partisan, Denne's views were moderate: he preached Arminian tenets, according to some, but others, in bad faith, tried to libel him as antinomian. Besides the works already mentioned, he wrote:

- "Grace, Mercy, and Peace", 1640 (reprinted in 1696).
- "The Man of Sin discovered, whom the Lord will destroy with the brightness of His Coming", 1645.
- "The Drag-Net of the Kingdom of Heaven; or Christ's drawing all Men", 1646.
- "The Levellers' Design discovered", 1649.
- "A Contention for Truth; in two several Disputations at St. Clement's Church, between Dr Gunning and Henry Denne, concerning Infant Baptism", 1658.
- "The Quaker no Papist, in answer to The Quaker Disarmed", 1659.
- "An Epistle recommended to all Prisons in this City and Nation. To such as chuse Restraint rather than the Violation of their Consciences, wherein is maintained: (1) The Lawfulness of an Oath; (2) The Antiquity of an Oath; (3) The Universality of it. With the most material Objections answered", 1660.

== Notes and references ==
- Oxford Dictionary of National Biography, Denne, Henry (1605/6?-1666), General Baptist minister and religious controversialist by T. L. Underwood. This article incorporates text from a publication now in the public domain: "Denne, Henry". Dictionary of National Biography. London: Smith, Elder & Co. 1885–1900.

=== Sources ===
- Campbell, Kenneth L. (2012). Windows into Men's Souls: Religious Nonconformity in Tudor and Early Stuart England. Plymouth: Lexington Books.
