= May 21 (Eastern Orthodox liturgics) =

Day in the Eastern Orthodox liturgical calendar

Eastern Orthodox liturgical calendar
May 20	May 21	May 22
May 21 O.S. ≍ June 3 N.S. May 21 N.S ≍ May 8 O.S.

Holy Equals-to-the-Apostles Emperor Constantine and Empress Helena, his mother. (Byzantine & Christian Museum, Athens. 17th century.).

May 21 in Eastern Orthodox liturgical calendars is a feast day and a day of commemoration of saints and martyrs. Although some Orthodox churches use the Revised Julian Calendar and others use the traditional Julian calendar, the fixed commemorations for their respective May 21 are broadly the same, no matter which calendar is used. (Note: Despite the dates being the same, the days to which they refer typically differ by 13 days. The notation Old Style or O.S. is sometimes used to indicate a date in the traditional Julian Calendar (the "Old Calendar"). The notation New Style or N.S. indicates a date in the Revised Julian calendar (the "New Calendar").)

== Saints ==
- Holy Equals-to-the-Apostles Emperor Constantine (337), and Empress Helena, his mother (327) (Note: Name days celebrated today include: Constantine, Kostas (Κωνσταντίνος); Constantina, Dina (Κωνσταντίνα); Helen, Eleni, Elena, Eileen (Ἑλένη).) (Note: These royal saints are invoked at Crownings (Wedding ceremonies) and are otherwise very popular saints in Ukraine, especially in connection to the Finding of the True Cross. St Olga of Kiev took the name “Helen” or “Olena” as her baptismal name after St Helen.)
- Martyrs Polyeuctus, Victorinus, and Donatus, at Caesarea in Cappadocia.
- Hieromartyr Secundus and those with him, in Alexandria (356)
- Saint Adelphios, Bishop of Onouphis, in Byzantine Egypt (c. 362) (Note: Onouphis: also Onouphitai, Mehallet Menuf, Mahallat Minuf. Note that there were two Bishops of Onouphis, with the name "Adelphios": Adelphios I — c. 362; and; Adelphios II — c. 431.; He was a contemporary of St. Athanasius I the Great, Patriarch of Alexandria, on whose side he opposed the Arians. He was exiled by Emperor Constantine I the Great to Ptinabla in Thebes. He took part in the Council of Alexandria in 362, at which dogmatic issues were decided, in particular, about the reception of former Arians into communion. Among others, he signed a tomos addressed to the Antiochians, designed to overcome the schism between the Meletians and the Eustatherians.)
- Saint Boros, monk. (Note: His memory is recalled in the "Jerusalemitic Canonarion", in conjunction with Isidore and Theodore.)
- Saint Christopher I, Patriarch of Antioch (967)

== Pre-Schism Western saints ==
- Hieromartyrs Timothy, Polius and Eutychius, deacons, in Mauretania Caesariensis, Morocco.
- Hieromartyr Valens and Companions, Bishop who was martyred in Auxerre in France along with three children.
- Martyr Secundinus, in Cordoba in Spain under Diocletian (c. 306)
- Saint Hospitius the Hermit of Nice, Wonderworker (581)
- Saint Barrfoin (Bairrfhionn, Barrindus) of Killbarron (6th century) (Note: By tradition he was in charge of the church founded by St Columba in Drum Cullen in Offaly, Ireland and later he lived in Killbarron near Ballyshannon in Donegal. It is said that he reached America on one of his missions by sea and informed St Brendan the Navigator of his discovery. He is also said to have been a bishop.)
- Saint Gollen (Collen, Colan) of Denbighshire, a saint who has given his name to Llangollen in Wales (7th century)
- Saint Isberga (Itisberga) of Aire, reputed sister of Charlemagne, nun at Aire (Aria) in the Artois, of which she is the patroness (c. 800) (Note: "Gallican and Belgian Martyrologies. Regarded as patroness of Artois. Great difficulties stand in the way of giving her history accurately. It is uncertain whether she is to be identified with Gisela, the sister of Charlemagne, or not." The legend of S. Gisela, or Isberga, is given in the "Lédgendaire de La Morine." See also the discussion on Toponymy: (in French) Aire-sur-la-Lys: Toponymie. Wikipédia. (French Wikipedia).)
- Saint Ageranus (Ayran, Ayrman) of Beze, a monk at Bèze in France, martyred by the Vikings (888)
- Saint Theobald of Vienne (Thibaud), Archbishop of Vienne (970-1001)

== Post-Schism Orthodox saints ==
- Right-Believing Sviatoslav II Yaroslavich, Grand Prince of Kiev, son of Saint Yaroslav the Wise (1076) (see also: December 27 - repose)
- Blessed Constantine (Yaroslav), prince, and his children Michael and Theodore, Wonderworkers of Murom (1129)
- Saint Cyril II (Kirill), Bishop of Rostov (1262)
- Saint Basil of Ryazan, Bishop (1295) (Note: See: (in Russian) Василий I (епископ Рязанский). Википедии. (Russian Wikipedia).) (see also: April 12)
- Saint Helen of Dečani, Serbia, Princess (c. 1350)
- Venerable Cassian the Greek, monk of Uglich, Wonderworker (1504) (Note: See: (in Russian) Кассиан Грек. Википедии. (Russian Wikipedia).)
- Monk-martyr Agapitus of Markushev, Vologda (1584)
- Saint Constantine the Fool-for-Christ, of Novotorzhsky, Russia (c. 16th century) (Note: St Constantine is mentioned by Archbishop Dmitri Sambikin (1905-1908), in the Menologion and Paterikon of Tver.) (Note: See: (in Russian) Борисоглебский монастырь (Торжок). Википедии. (Russian Wikipedia).)
- New Martyrs King Constantine Brancoveanu of Wallachia and his four sons Constantine, Stephen, Radu, and Matthew, and his counsellor Ianache (1714) (Note: See also: August 16. May 21 may refer to the Translation of his relics, in 1720.)
- Martyr Pachomios of Patmos (1730)
- Saint Callistratus of Georgia, Catholicos-Patriarch of All Georgia (1952) (Note: He was glorified by the Georgian Orthodox Church on 22 December 2016, his feast day set for 3 June (NS 21 May).)

=== New martyrs and confessors ===
- Synaxis of All Saints of Karelia. (Note: See: (in Russian) Собор Карельских святых. Википедии. (Russian Wikipedia).)
- Synaxis of All Saints of Simbirsk. (Note: See: (in Russian) Собор Симбирских святых. Википедии. (Russian Wikipedia).)
- Synaxis of New Hieromartyrs and Confessors of Ufa. (Note: See: (in Russian) Собор Уфимских святых. Википедии. (Russian Wikipedia).)

== Other commemorations ==
- Repose of Elena Pavlova of Chepel, Kharkiv (1885)
- Repose of Elder Isaac of Dionysiou Monastery of Mount Athos (1932)
- Uncovering of the relics (1998) of St. Andrew Ogorodnikov, Fool-for-Christ of Simbirsk (1841) (Note: See: (in Russian) Андрей Симбирский. Википедии. (Russian Wikipedia).)
- The Anastenaria fire-walking ritual is performed from May 21–23 in some villages in Northern Greece and Southern Bulgaria, coinciding with the feast of Constantine and Helen. (Note: "According to local legend, the Anastenaria fire-walking tradition began when a fire broke out in the Church of Constantine and Helen in the village of Kosti in Thrace. The villagers defied the danger and entered the blazing church to save the icons, emerging unscathed. The miracle is now celebrated each year when the ‘Anastenarides’ walk barefoot on burning coals.")

=== Icons ===
- Synaxis of the "Vladimir" Icon of the Most Holy Theotokos (1521) (Note: The Celebration of the Vladimir Icon of the Mother of God was established in memory of the saving of Moscow in the year 1521 from an invasion of Tatars led by Khan Makhmet-Girei. It is commemorated on May 21, as well as June 23 and August 26.)
- Synaxis of the "Virgin of Tenderness" Icon of the Most Holy Theotokos from Pskov-Pechersk (1524) (Note: Commemorated on May 21, August 26, June 23, October 7 and on the 7th Sunday of Pascha.) (Note: See: (in Russian) Псково-Печерская икона «Умиление». Википедии. (Russian Wikipedia).)

== Icon gallery ==
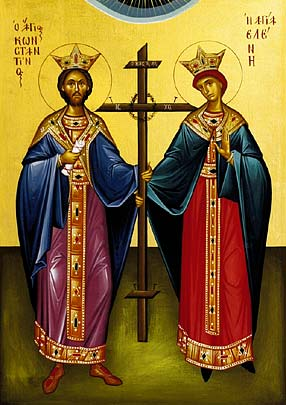
Sts Constantine and Helena, Holy Equals-to-the-Apostles.

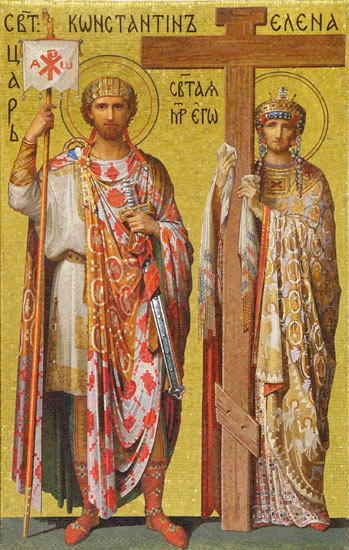
Sts Constantine and Helena, Holy Equals-to-the-Apostles.
(Mosaic in Saint Isaac's Cathedral, St. Petersburg, Russia).

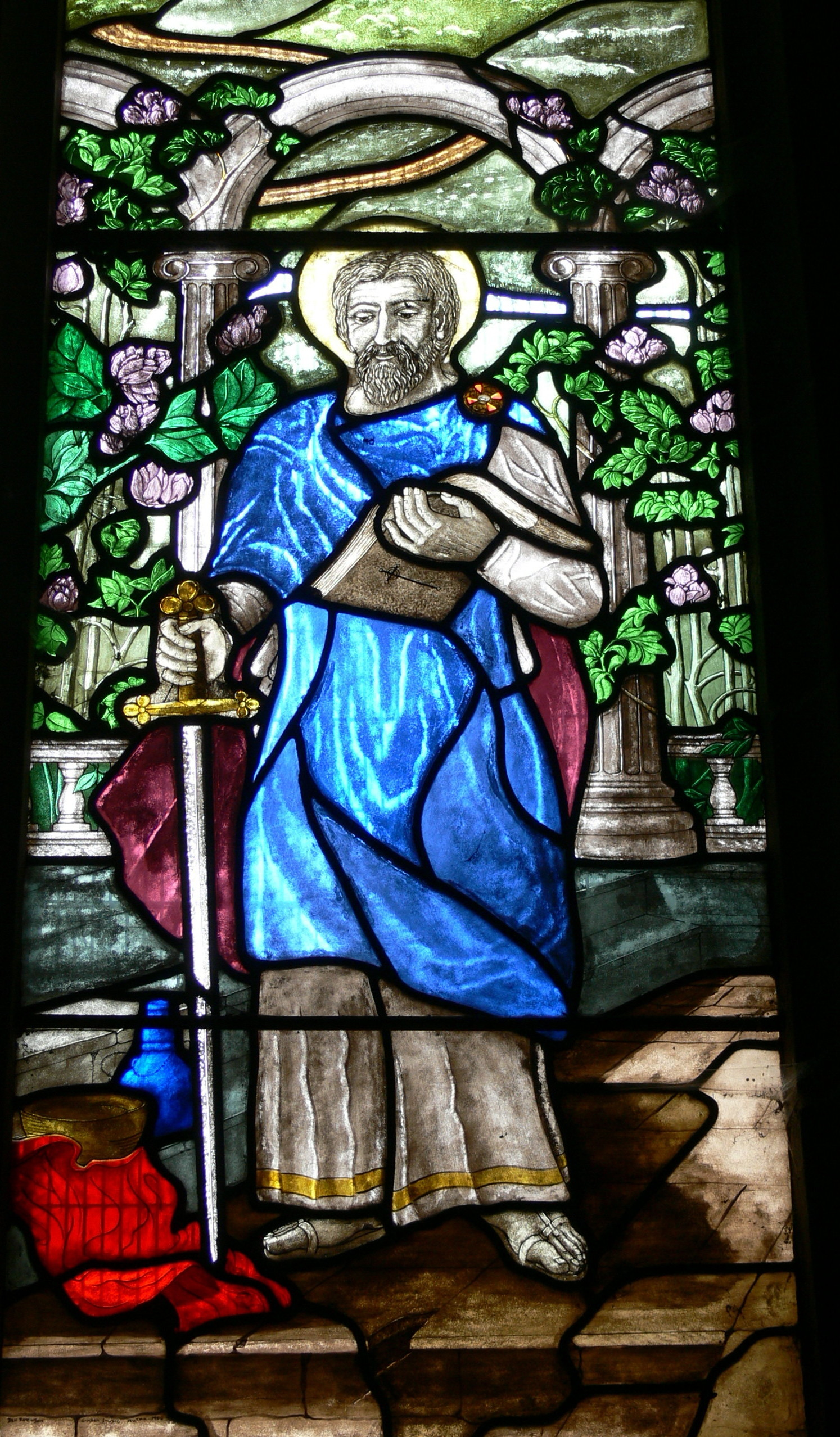
Stained glass window (1986) showing St Collen.
(Llangollen, Wales - St.Collen parish church).

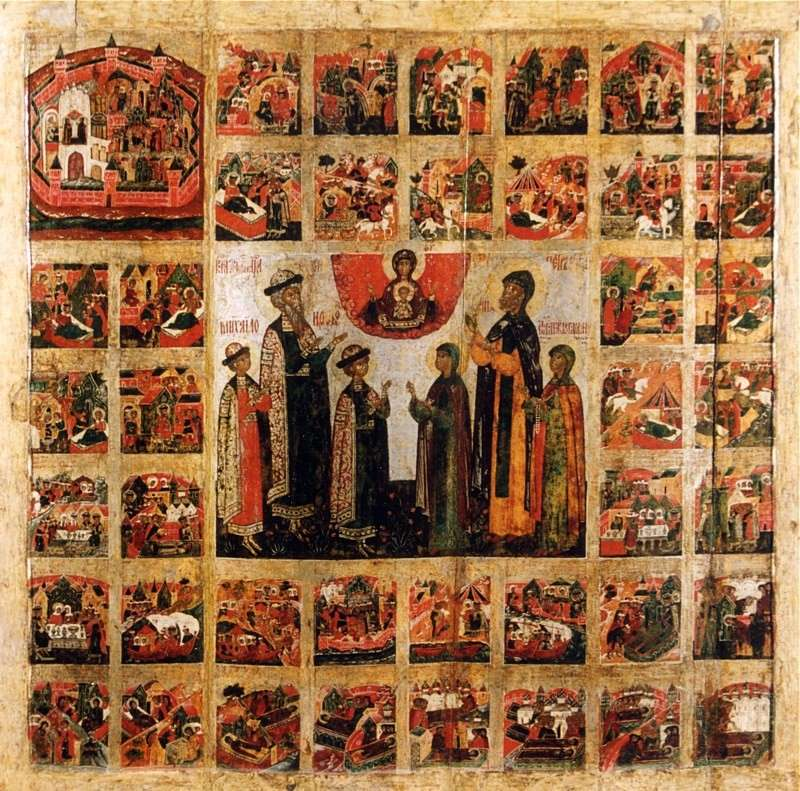
Icon of the Saints of Murom (including Saints Prince Constantine, with Children Michael and Theodore).

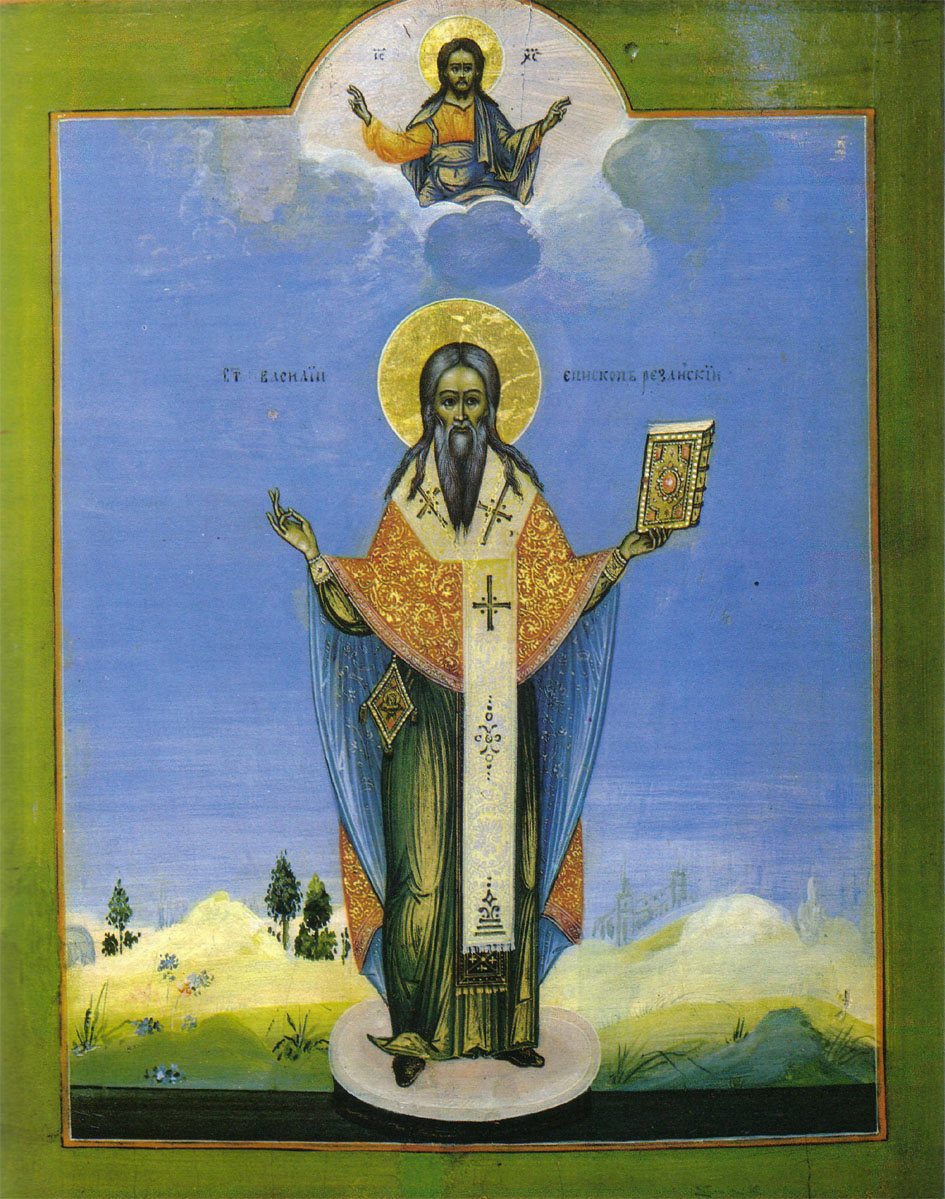
Saint Basil of Ryazan, Bishop.

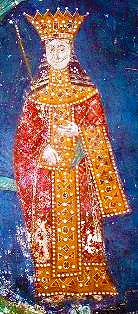
Saint Helen of Dečani, Serbia, Princess.

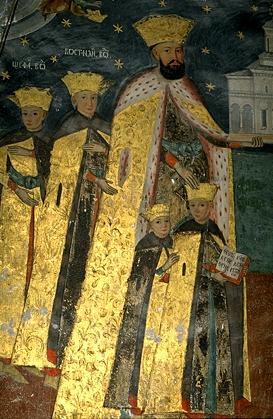
King Constantin Brâncoveanu of Wallachia, and his sons (Church mural in Hurezi Monastery).

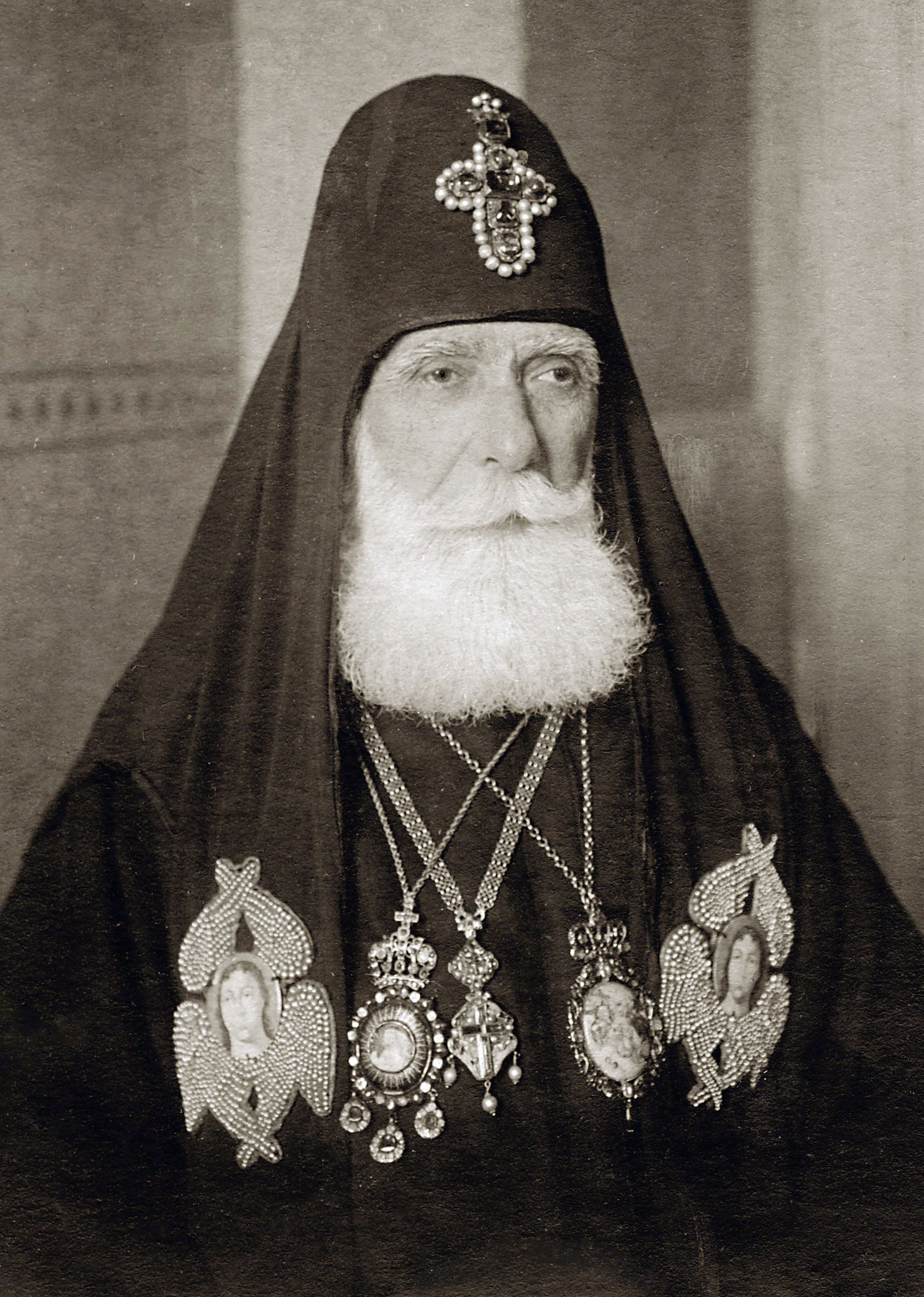
Saint Callistratus of Georgia, Catholicos-Patriarch of All Georgia.

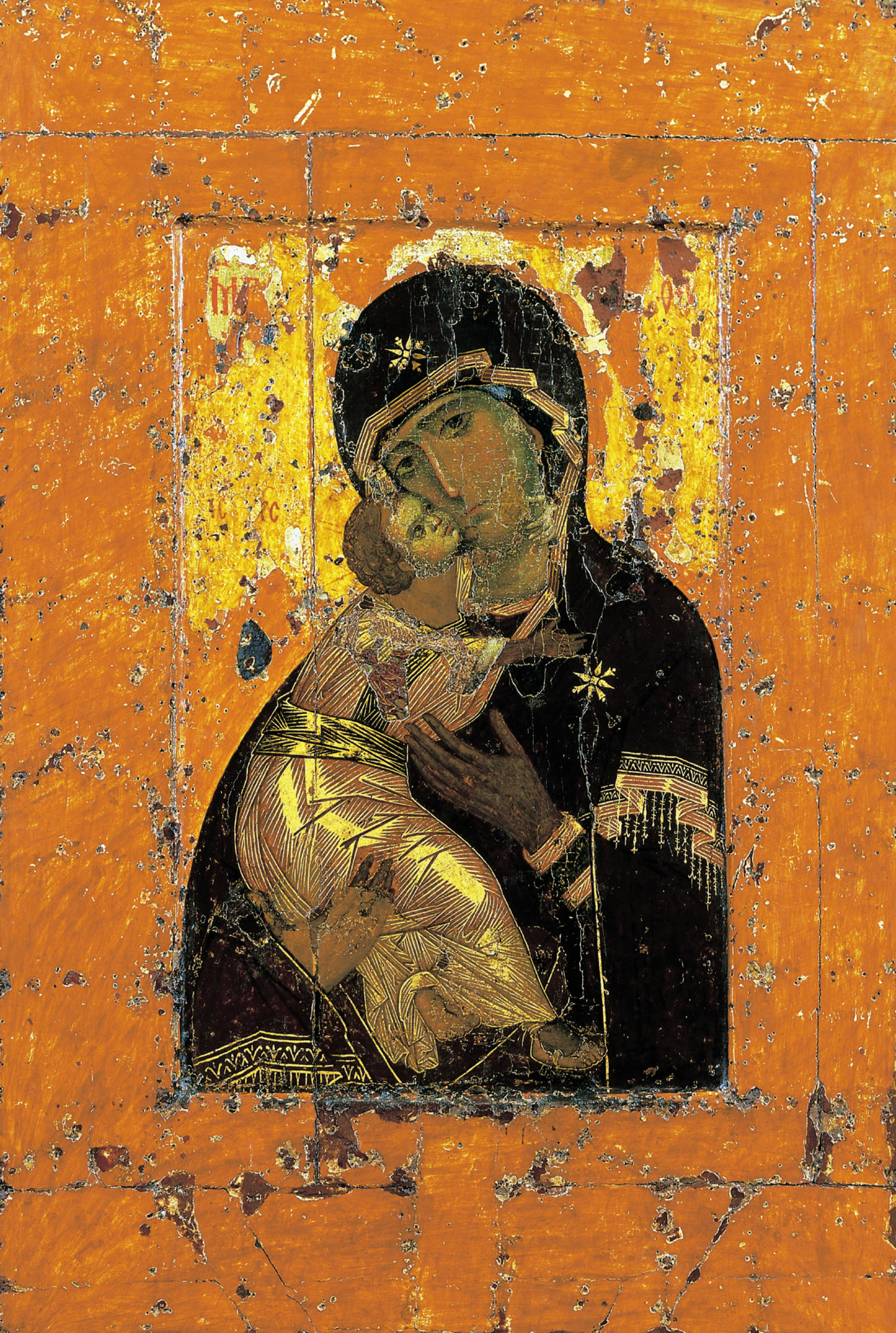
Our Lady of Vladimir (painted about 1131 in Constantinople).

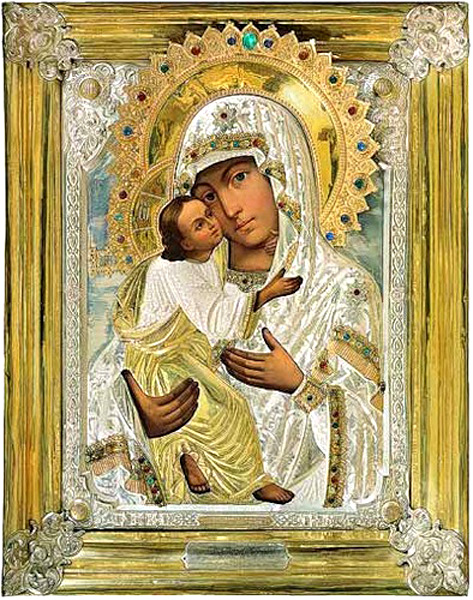
"Virgin of Tenderness" Icon of the Most Holy Theotokos from Pskov-Pechersk.

== Sources ==
- May 21/June 3. Orthodox Calendar (ORTHOCHRISTIAN.COM).
- June 3 / May 21. HOLY TRINITY RUSSIAN ORTHODOX CHURCH (A parish of the Patriarchate of Moscow).
- May 21. Latin Saints of the Orthodox Patriarchate of Rome.
- May 21. The Roman Martyrology.

Greek Sources

- Great Synaxaristes: (in Greek) 21 ΜΑΪΟΥ. ΜΕΓΑΣ ΣΥΝΑΞΑΡΙΣΤΗΣ.
- (in Greek) Συναξαριστής. 21 Μαΐου. ECCLESIA.GR. (H ΕΚΚΛΗΣΙΑ ΤΗΣ ΕΛΛΑΔΟΣ).

Russian Sources

- (in Russian) 3 июня (21 мая). Православная Энциклопедия под редакцией Патриарха Московского и всея Руси Кирилла (электронная версия). (Orthodox Encyclopedia - Pravenc.ru).
- (in Russian) 21 мая (ст.ст.) 3 июня 2013 (нов. ст.). Русская Православная Церковь Отдел внешних церковных связей. (DECR).
