= Andronicus of Pannonia =

Biblical figure, saint

Saint Andronicus
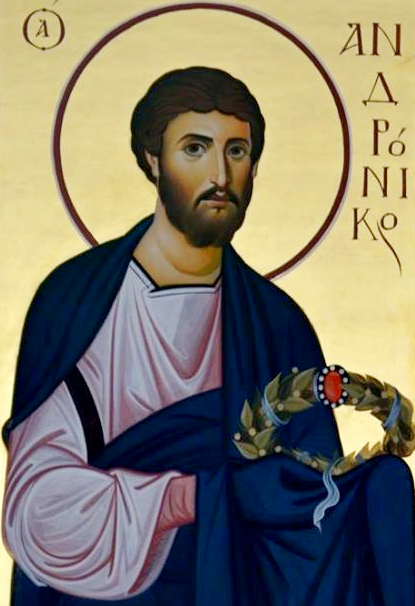

Disciple of the Seventy Martyr
- Venerated in: Eastern Orthodox Church; Oriental Orthodox Church; Anglican Communion; Catholic Church
- Feast: May 17, 22 Pashons
- Attributes: Wreath

Andronicus of Pannonia (Greek: Ἀνδρόνικος) was a 1st-century Christian mentioned by the Apostle Paul in his Epistle to the Romans (chapter 16):

Salute Andronicus and Junia, my kinsmen, and my fellow prisoners, who are of note among the apostles, who also were in Christ before me.

— Romans 16:7 Authorized Version
(other versions: Romans 16:7)

According to that verse, Andronicus was a kinsman of Paul and a fellow prisoner at some time, particularly well known among the apostles, and had become a follower of Jesus Christ before Paul's Damascus road conversion. It is generally assumed that Junia was his wife, but they could have been brother and sister, or father and daughter, or no close relation to each other, but to Paul as kinsmen.

== Apostleship ==
Translations of the New Testament vary with their renditions of the Greek words translated as "of note" and "apostles". One theory is that Andronicus and Junia were not apostles themselves, but enjoyed a high reputation among the apostles. However, classicist Evelyn Stagg and New Testament scholar Frank Stagg write that Paul makes a special point of explicitly stating how well known the couple is to him. His references to the couple's imprisonment with him and to the time of their conversion relative to his own would give him no interest in deferring to the opinion of others as a source of credentials. Hence, he considers himself competent to endorse the couple as "apostles" on the basis of his own involvement with them. The Staggs conclude that both the context and the content of this verse require that it be read naturally as Paul's commendation of Andronicus and Junia as being remarkable Christian workers and "apostles" alongside Silas, Timothy, and others given that title in the early Church. The traditional view of the Eastern Orthodox Church, states that Andronicus was Bishop of Pannonia and that Andronicus and Junia were both martyred.

== Veneration ==
In the Eastern Orthodox and Oriental Orthodox traditions, Andronicus was one of the Seventy Apostles. Andronicus was made bishop of Pannonia and preached the Gospel throughout the whole of Pannonia together with Junia. Andronicus and Junia were successful in bringing many to Christ and in demolishing many temples of idolatry. The tradition holds that they were capable of performing miracles, by which they drove out demons and healed many of sickness and disease.

In the Eastern Orthodox tradition, Andronicus died as a martyr. He and Junia are commemorated in the Eastern Orthodox Church on May 17. In the Oriental Orthodox tradition, Andronicus departed in peace one day before the departure of Junia. He is commemorated on 22 Pashons in the Coptic Orthodox Church.

The Catholic archbishopric of Moravia was originally established by Pope Nicholas I in the 9th century as a revival of the see founded by Andronicus.
