= Menouf =

Menouf منوف ⲡⲁⲛⲟⲩϥ
- City
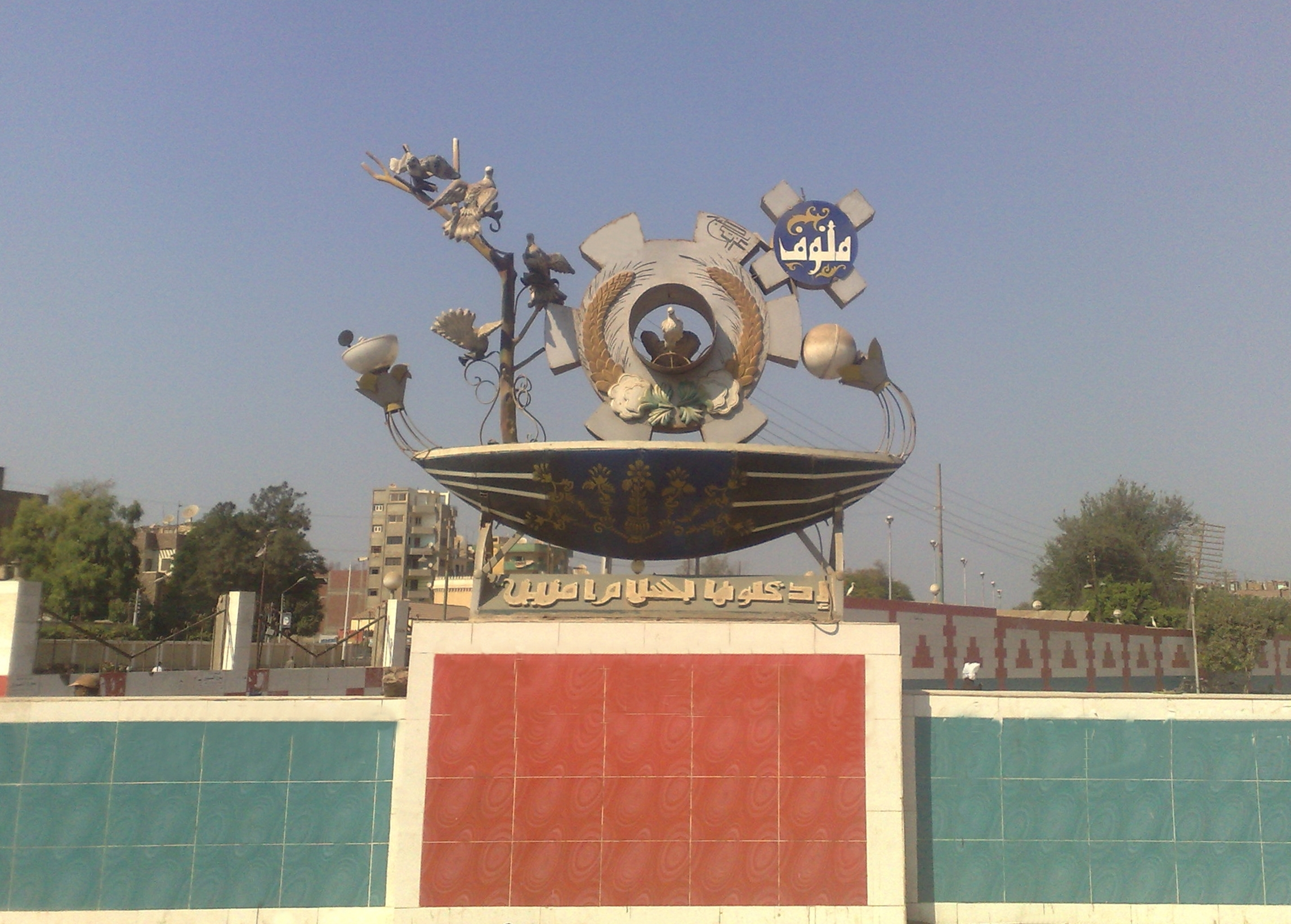
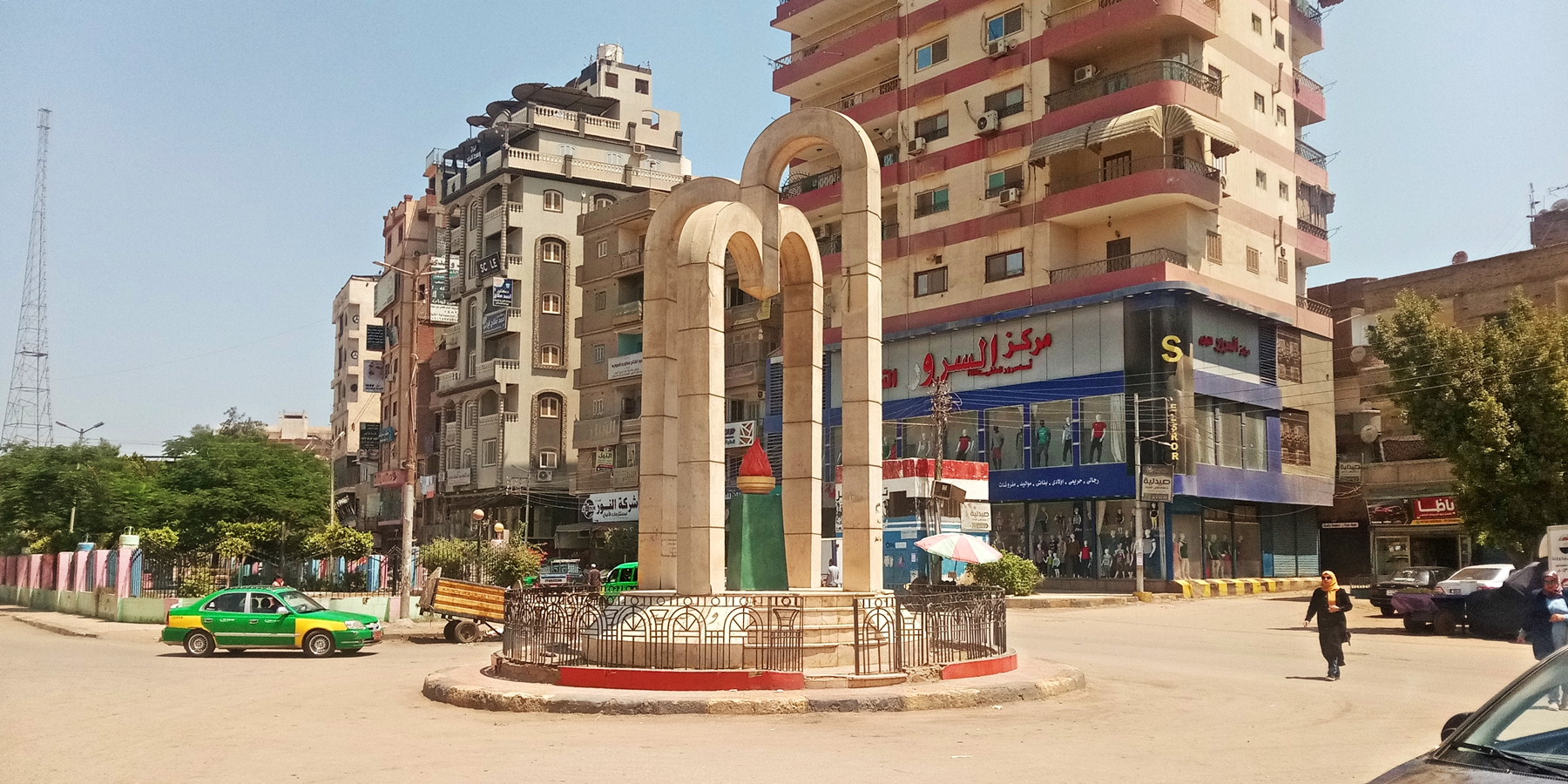
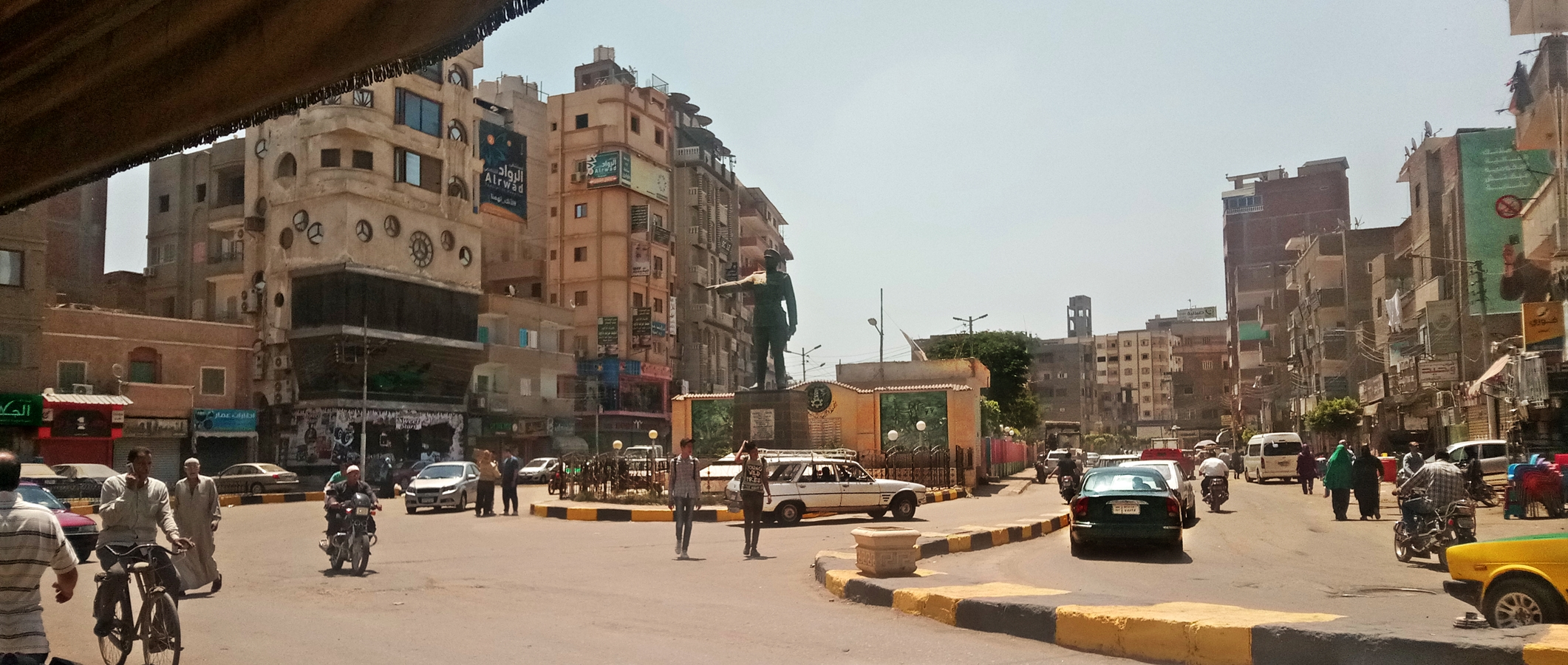

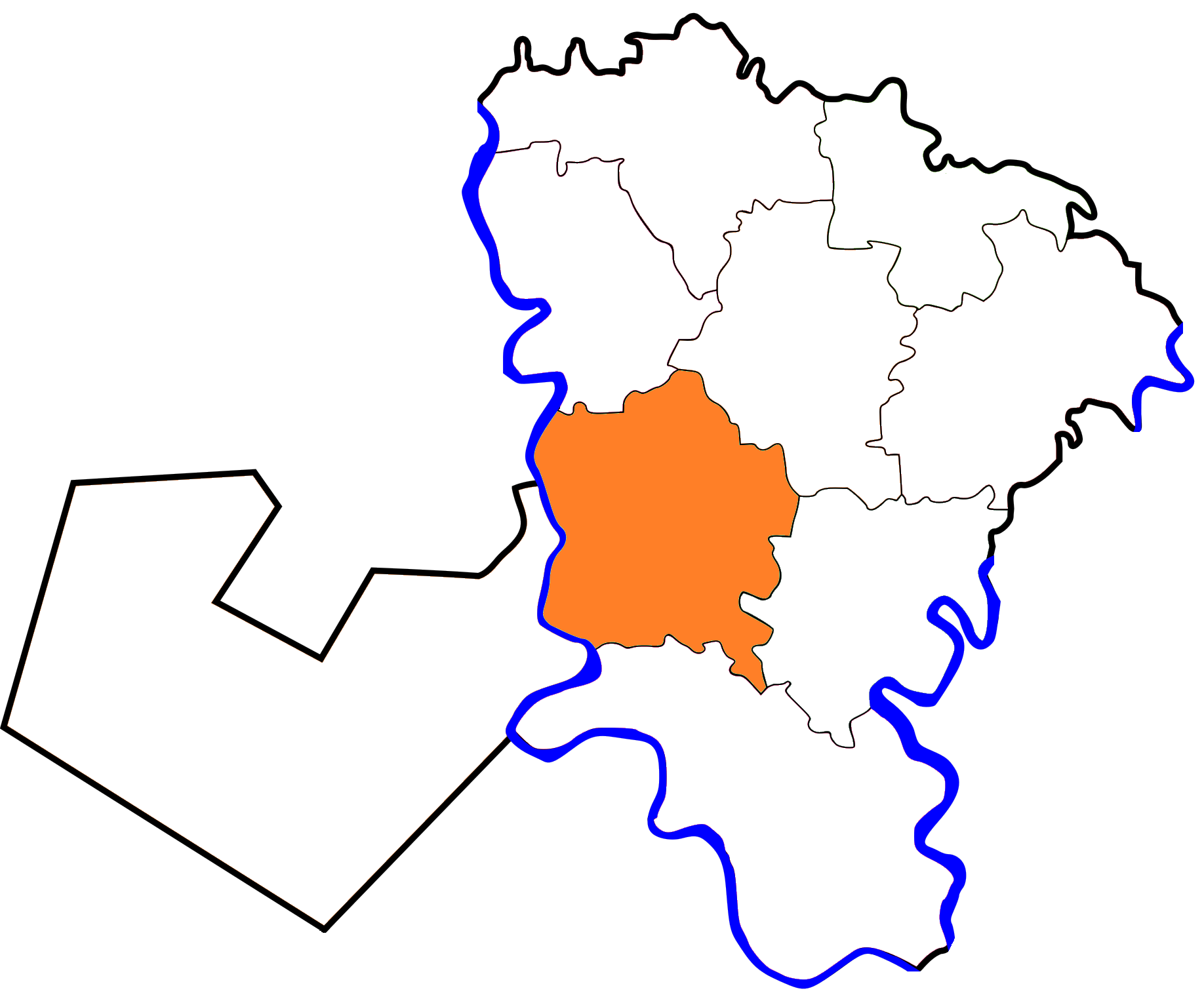
- Location in Monufia Governorate

- Location in Egypt
- Coordinates: 30.465839°N 30.930805°E
- Country: Egypt
- Governorate: Monufia

Area
  - Total: 17.40 km^{2} (6.72 sq mi)
- Elevation: 20 m (66 ft)

Population (2021)
  - Total: 125,707
  - Density: 7,225/km^{2} (18,710/sq mi)
- Time zone: UTC+2 (EET)
  - Summer (DST): UTC+3 (EEST)

Menouf (Arabic: منوف, romanized: Minūf, from Coptic: ⲡⲁⲛⲟⲩϥ) is a city in Egypt located in the Nile Delta. It has an area of 18.76 square kilometers. The city gave its name to the Monufia Governorate where it is located and was the capital of the governorate until 1826. Menouf is one of the several continually inhabited ancient Egyptian cities in the governorate.

== Name ==
Menouf was formerly called Minuf al-Ulyah (Arabic: منوف العليا, lit. 'the upper Menouf'), which comes from Coptic: ⲡⲁⲛⲟⲩϥ ⲣⲏⲥ, lit. 'southern Panouf' (with variants ⲉⲛⲟⲩϥⲓ ⲣⲏⲥ and ⲁⲛⲟⲩϥⲉ). "The upper" in this case also means "southern", i.e. located upriver in relation to the Nile's flow (see Upper Egypt), which was used to differentiate it from Minuf as-Sufli (Arabic: منوف السفلي, lit. 'the lower Minuf', Coptic: ⲡⲁⲛⲟⲩϥ ϧⲏⲧ, lit. 'northern Panouf'), modern Mahallat Menouf.

The Coptic name Panouf in turn is derived from Ancient Egyptian: pꜣ-jw-nfr, lit. 'the good island'. The city's Greek name Onouphis Ano (Ancient Greek: Ὀνουφις) comes from the Egyptian name as well.

== History ==
Panouf was a bishopric by the middle of the fourth century as evidenced by the attendance of Bishop Adelphis of Onouphis at a synod in Alexandria in 362.

During the Heraclean revolt the city was an important center of the Blues, loyal to the emperor Phocas. General Bonasus gave battle to the rebels east of Panouf and defeated them, but the city was captured by Nicetas in a short while.

By the 19th century the city went into decline. It had no gardens, its streets were narrow and dirty, and its houses small and badly constructed. The people drank the Nile water.

== Notable people ==
- Abraham of Egypt
- Pope Joseph I of Alexandria

== See also ==
- List of cities and towns in Egypt
