= Eldon Epp =

American biblical scholar

Eldon Jay Epp (born 1930) is an American New Testament scholar and textual critic.

Epp studied at Wheaton College (Bachelor of Arts, 1952), Fuller Theological Seminary (Bachelor of Divinity, 1955), Harvard University (Master of Sacred Theology; 1956; Doctor of Philosophy, 1961). He taught at the University of Southern California from 1962 to 1968, and at Case Western Reserve University from 1968 to 1998.

According to Jennifer Wright Knust and Tommy Wasserman, Epp has "tirelessly devoted himself to the careful reconstruction of ancient texts and their histories as well as to the transmission of knowledge about how to undertake this crucial task."

Epp is also well known for arguing in his Junia: The First Woman Apostle (Fortress Press, 2005) that Junia in Romans 16:7 was a female apostle. Epp's monograph has been influential in shifting the consensus of New Testament scholarship on this point.

Epp served as President of the Society of Biblical Literature in 2003.
