= Mrs Attaway =

Londoner Baptist preacher

Elizabeth Attaway
- Occupations: Lacemaker; Lay preacher
- Spouse: William Jenney

Elizabeth Attaway (fl. 1642–47) was an English General Baptist lay preacher and theologian. She was a proeminent female preacher in London, notable for her famous sermons and higher view on divorce.

== Life ==
Elizabeth Attaway's life is little known, but much of her work is recorded by Thomas Edwards in Gangraena, who often offered a distorted and biased view. Attaway was a lacewoman, married to a Parliament soldier. She was member of the Baptist church at Coleman Street, known as Coleman Street Church of Christ, ministered mainly by Thomas Lambe. Her husband did not share her religious enthusiasm. Attaway was an early reader of Milton’s Doctrine and Discipline of Divorce.

== Preaching ==
Elizabeth Attaway initially preached on Tuesday services at four o'clock only to the women of the church, but in time she made no restrictions on the attendants. The Tuesday services where not organized as official public services led by a minister, as the Sunday services. Her notable preaching ability gained the attention of several Londoners that came to listen her, including men. Attaway opened the Tuesday service to the public in response to the influx of a huge crowd of attendants. After the sermons, she started to open space for discussion.

Attaway delivered a sermon in the Coleman Street church on Tuesday 9 December 1645. She preached "a word of exhortation" from Acts 2 about how "God would poure out of his Spirit upon the handmaidens". She afterwards said a lengthy prayer that lasted for half an hour, and conclude the service with a reading of John 14:15. An attendant left the service before the end and falsely accused her to Thomas Edwards of preaching with "confusion, horror, and disorder". In the following week, on 16 December 1645, a thousand Londoners attended the service at Coleman Street to hear her preaching. Attaway was later criticised by her opponents for allowing the crowd to ask questions.

During a sermon, on Thursday 8 January 1646, a lady member of the church questioned Attaway on "what warrant she had to preach in this manner". Attaway asked what was the meaning of "this manner". The lady responded that she was preaching to unbaptized people, and should only preach to the baptized. Then, a heated discussion on infant baptism initiated. In the course of the questions, Attaway denied that she was an ordained preacher, and that she was just quoting the Bible to encourage other Christians to exhort one another. Eventually, Attaway stood, offered a prayer of thanksgiving for the discussion, and walked away from the table. Another woman stood and concluded the service, dismissing the congregation.
