= Thomas Lambe =

English church leader and merchant

Thomas Lambe (died 1672) was an English Nonconformist church leader and merchant. Lambe was an influential General Baptist minister among Puritans in the City of London.

== Life and ministry ==
Lambe's birth date is unknown, but it was in the early years of the seventeenth century. Records of his activities exist from 1629 onwards, at which time he was living in St Giles in Colchester with his wife and eight children.

From 1629-1639 he was frequently in trouble with the Archdeacon's Court in Colchester for preaching outside of the bounds of the Church of England during the time that the Archbishop of Canterbury, William Laud was seeking to impose uniformity upon the churches in England. This was to continue throughout his ministry as he was frequently arrested and imprisoned.

His Dissenting views developed into distinctly beliefs and practices during the 1630s. By 1640, Lambe was pastor of the Baptist church in Bell Alley, Coleman Street, London (along with Samuel Oates and Henry Denne). This church is also referred to as the Coleman Street Church of Christ. He was soon arrested and imprisoned for four months and was released on bail 25 June 1640, with the injunction "not to preach, baptize or frequent any conventicle."

The meetings in Coleman Street were open to the public and reported as being lively: "Many used to resort to this church and meeting, the house, yards full, especially young youths & wenches flock hither and all of them preach universal redemption. In their church meetings and exercises there is such a confusion & noise as if it were a play." This church was successful and was described in 1647 by Robert Baillie in a tract against such churches as "Mr Lamb's (sic) congregation, the greatest as they say, and most fruitful of all their societies without comparison."

He travelled extensively across England preaching, baptizing and planting churches, for example in Gloucestershire in December 1641 where he preached at Cranham and "subverted many. And shortly after, in extreme cold, and frosty time, in the night season, diverse men and women were rebaptized in the Severn by Gloucester."

His congregation included Mrs Attaway who came to notice as a Baptist preacher in 1645 and 1646.

== Writings ==
Lambe published a number of important books, including: Fountaine of Free Grace Opened and A Treatise on Particular Predestination (1642) – in which he appears to believe that Christ died for everyone rather than like the Particular Baptists, who believed that Christ died for the elect. His ministry had a number of other distinctive features in comparison with some other seventeenth century Dissenter leaders: freedom for women to partake of the Lord's Supper in meetings; meetings open to the public; support for the Levellers; and his irenical approach to the authorities and some of his fellow brethren.

The date of his death is 1672.
