= Junia (New Testament person) =

First century Christian

Saint Junia
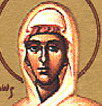
- Junia, as depicted in an icon with Andronicus and Athanasius of Christianoupolis
- Venerated in: Eastern Orthodox Church, Oriental Orthodox Churches
- Feast: May 17, 23 Pashons (Coptic Orthodox)
- Attributes: Christian Martyrdom

Junia, also erroneously known as Junias (Biblical Greek: Ἰουνία/Ἰουνίας, Iounia/Iounias), was an early Christian female apostle in the first century known from Paul the Apostle's letter to the Romans.

There has been dispute surrounding both Junia's gender and apostolic status among some in biblical scholarship as well as Catholic and Protestant (but not Orthodox) tradition. Junia has been viewed as female through most of Christian history as well as by the majority of scholars. With the exception of the reference to a masculine "Junias" in the Index Discipulorum, purportedly from Epiphanius of Salamis (fourth century), the first texts regarding Junia as a male named Junias come from 12th century manuscripts and the first named author to describe Junia as a male was Giles of Rome in the 13th century.

The precise nature of Junia's apostolic status, however, has been more debated. Whereas the NIV calls Junia "outstanding among the apostles" and the NRSV "prominent among the apostles", implying that Junia was an apostle, the ESV has "well known to the apostles" and the NASB "outstanding in the view of the apostles", making no such implication.

Romans 16:7 is the only place in the New Testament where Junia is named, although some have also identified her with a woman from the Gospels named Joanna, the wife of Chuza, who appears in Luke 8:1–3 and the narrative where the women visit the tomb of Jesus towards the end of the Gospels.

== Background ==
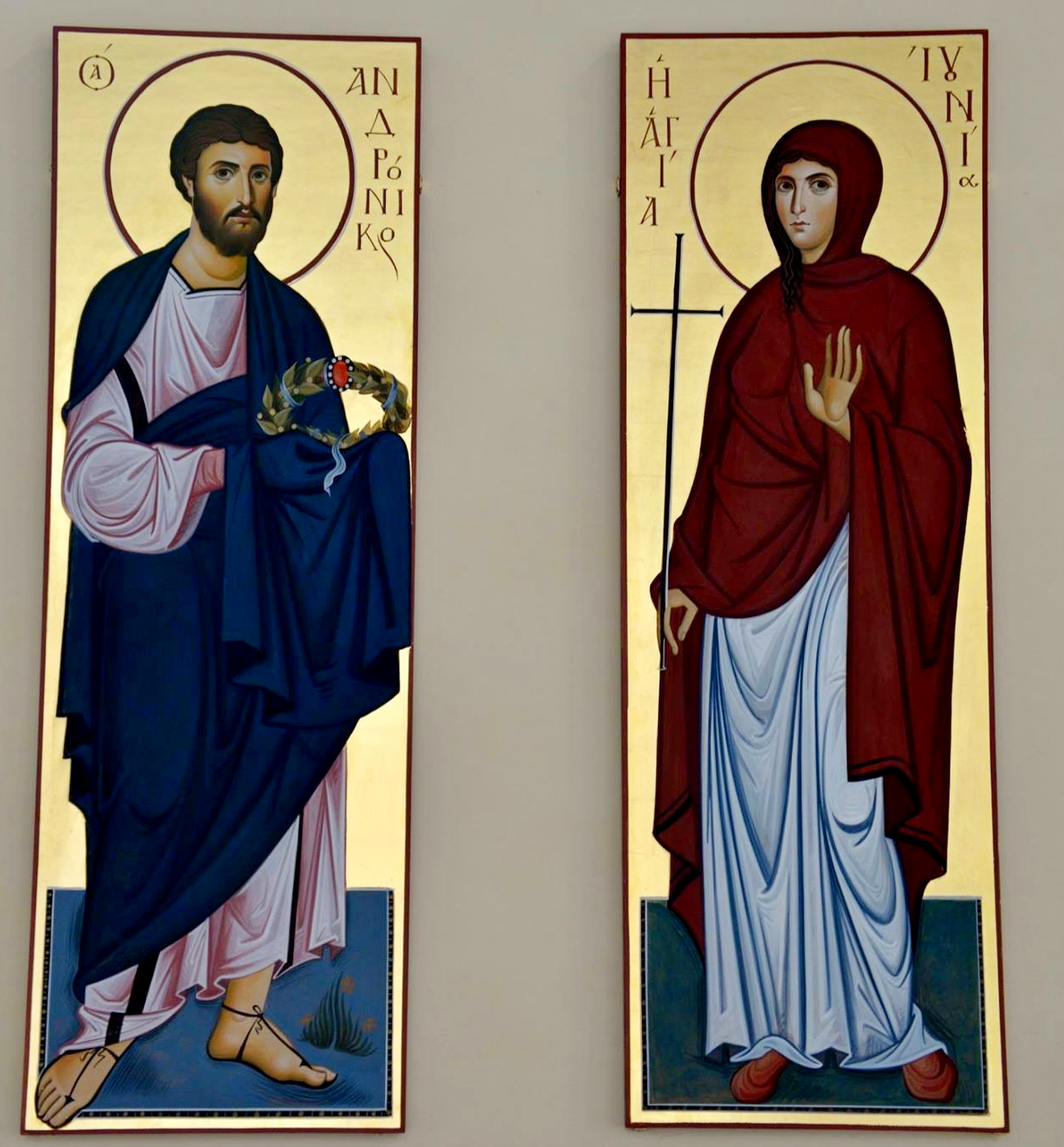
Depiction of Andronicus and Junia in the Santissimo Salvatore, Palermo

Romans 16 is the final chapter of Paul's letter to the Romans. In this chapter, Paul mentions his greetings to a number of other members of the Christian community in his time, one third of them being women. Of the twelve members that Paul describes in this chapter as having contributed the most to the church, seven were women whereas five were men. Among those women were Junia who is introduced in Romans 16:7;

ἀσπάσασθε Ἀνδρόνικον καὶ Ἰουνίαν τοὺς συγγενεῖς μου καὶ συναιχμαλώτους μου, οἵτινές εἰσιν ἐπίσημοι ἐν τοῖς ἀποστόλοις, οἳ καὶ πρὸ ἐμοῦ γεγόνασιν ἐν Χριστῷ.

Greet Andronicus and Junia, my fellow Jews who have been in prison with me. They are outstanding among the apostles, and they were in Christ before I was. (NIV)

== Junia's sex ==
In the first millennium of Christianity, Junia was understood to be female. For example, John Chrysostom wrote:

"Greet Andronicus and Junia ... who are outstanding among the apostles": To be an apostle is something great. But to be outstanding among the apostles— just think what a wonderful song of praise that is! They were outstanding on the basis of their works and virtuous actions. Indeed, how great the wisdom of this woman must have been that she was even deemed worthy of the title of apostle.

All others in the first millennium of the ancient church also took the name to be feminine, as Bernadette Brooten demonstrated in her 1977 article on Junia; Brooten points to the first commentator on the passage, Origen of Alexandria, who in the 2nd century AD assumed the name to be feminine. She points to additional early Christian commentators, all of whom gave no indication of doubt that the epistle referred to Junia and that she was a woman and an apostle, including Jerome (4th-5th century), Hatto of Vercelli (10th century), Theophylact, and Peter Abelard (both 11th century). Brooten affirms that the earliest instance of someone taking the name to be masculine is Aegidius of Rome in the 13th-14th century, but demonstrates that the name was not commonly seen as masculine until well after the Reformation. Christine Schenk CSJ writes that "transcribers could not believe a woman would bear the title apostle, even though virtually all early Christian writers, from Chrysostom to Origen to Peter Lombard, assumed that Junia was a woman apostle." Schenk cites Eldon Epp as finding "no male name Junias... in ancient sources, while the female Junia is common." Likewise, the most ancient New Testament manuscript versions all read "Junia". The name Junia was also provided as the most likely reading in the Nestle-Åland Greek New Testament from its inception in 1898 until its 13th revision in 1927, at which point (without any new manuscript evidence to bring about the change), the preference changed to the male "Junias"; Junia was not restored until its 27th revision in 1998.

While some debate proliferated beginning in the first half of the 20th century, it has now been widely accepted that Junia was a woman. Until the 12th century, there is no record of Junia being interpreted as a man, and it takes until the 13th century for an author to make that claim where the feminine name Junia was altered to the masculine name Junias. As such, some scholars see Junia's apostleship and the reference to her in Romans 16:7 as proof that Paul the Apostle, whose name is ascribed to thirteen epistles in the New Testament, encouraged female leaders in the Church. However, some modern translations that are ideologically committed to complementarianism, such as the English Standard Version, present Junias as male.

Although the Church Father Origen identified Junia as a female, later medieval translations of Origen's work rendered Junia as Junias, a man. (Some medieval writers such as Rabanus Maurus and Tyrannius Rufinus still have Junia in the feminine.) It was also in the medieval period that medieval scribes began replacing the name 'Junia' in biblical manuscripts with the masculine version, 'Junias', as a result of prejudices against the possibility of a female apostle being described in the Pauline letters. One writing attributed to Epiphanius of Salamis, a Christian living in the 4th century, also appears to describe Junia as a male; however, this work is only known by the 9th century at the earliest, and is most likely to have been misattributed by then to Epiphanius as another medieval example of the masculinization of Junia being back-dated to the period of the Church Fathers. There are later references as well, e. g. Aegidius of Rome (also called Giles of Rome in English, c. 1243–1316) in the late Middle Ages, though without explanation. Two centuries later, in 1512, Jacques LeFevre also considered Junia a man, even though in the Latin translation available to him the name was clearly feminine. (A different feminine version, Julia, is found in five manuscripts, the earliest one being Papyrus 46.)

The earliest copies of the Greek texts for Romans 16:7 are majuscules (i.e. written only in capital letters) without accent marks. Because the gender of the name depends on accentuation, the name itself is insufficient to determine gender and reliance is instead placed on patristic evidence. By the time accentuation appears in manuscripts of the New Testament, Junia is unanimously accented as a female name. The critical Greek text of the New Testament produced by Erasmus in 1516, for example, accented the name as feminine, and this continues in every critical Greek text with a single exception (in the 1858 Alford edition) until 1928, when the Novum Testamentum Graece accented it as male. This caused a monumental shift towards masculine accentuation until 1998, when the feminine form came back to domination.

Only one record of the male name "Junias" has been discovered in extra-biblical Greek literature, which names him as the bishop of Apameia of Syria. Three clear occurrences of "Junia" have been found. While earlier searches for "Junias" in Latin also yielded no evidence, it is reported that "Junias" has been found as a Latin nickname or diminutive for the name "Junianas", which was not uncommon both in Greek and Latin. While this is a possibility, historical studies on the name "Junia" as a contracted form of "Junianas" has shown there are over 250 citations of the name Junia in antiquity all of which have been found to refer to women, with not one single case proven to be the abbreviated form of Junianus to Junia. Meanwhile, the name Junia is attested multiple times on inscriptions, tombstones and records; most notably, the half sister, Junia Secunda, of Marcus Junius Brutus.

In 2008, without dismissing the possibility of Junia being a Latin female name, Al Wolters suggested the possibility that Iounian, accented on the second syllable, was the accusative case of Ἰουνίας, being a Hellenized form of the Hebrew name Yĕḥunnī, which would enable the possibility of this being a male name. However, in one response, Wolters' argument has been accused of being "teleologically driven". Yii-Jan Lin has noted, of the two possibilities, the Latin name Junia is attested over 250 times whereas the Hebrew rendering Wolters proposes only has 2 attestations, making the former more probable. Furthermore, Lin also notes that the parallel name mentioned in the verse, Andronicus, is also a Latin name, this being consistent with Junia as a Latin rather than a Hebrew name.

== Apostolic status ==
In modern New Testament scholarship the inclusive reading—numbering Andronicus and Junia among the apostles—is the dominant view. Scholars note that in the early church the title apostolos ("one who is sent") was not restricted to the Twelve but also applied to travelling missionaries and founders of Christian communities, a role consistent with Paul's description of the couple as having been "in Christ" before him.

=== The grammatical debate ===
As Greek and English New Testaments shifted back to the "Junia" reading, some modern interpreters sought to question whether the passage really describes Junia as an apostle. While the Greek of Romans 16:7 has often been translated as Junia having been "outstanding among the apostles", which is an inclusive reading that numbers Junia among the apostolic body, some have recently suggested that the Greek warrants the exclusive reading of Junia being "well known to the apostles", therefore excluding Junia from being an apostle. The latter reading is found in some translations today including the ESV.

An example where an analogous Greek construction is used in an exclusive sense is found in Euripides' Hippolytus 103, where the goddess Aphrodite is "famous among mortals", although not mortal herself. However, Linda Belleville has noted that (1) this is the only known example where a Greek construction is used in this sense (2) it comes five centuries prior to the writing of Paul (3) its relevance is called into question by the fact it comes from "a time when 'episemos' had not yet acquired a comparative sense."

An argument for the ESV translation appeared in a 2001 paper by Michael Burer and Daniel Wallace who agree that Junia was a woman but assert that the correct rendition of the Greek text places her as well known to the apostles rather than prominent among the apostles. That translation would indicate that the pair were not apostles, but that they enjoyed a high reputation among the apostles.

This rejection of Junia's apostolic status has been criticized by Linda Belleville, Richard Bauckham, and Eldon Epp. Among other things, Burer and Wallace were criticized for using a small sample size and for often including evidence from grammatical constructions that did not support their case; it was also noted that the more standard reading of the passage's Greek was never questioned until the verse was once again understood to contain a woman. Belleville has marshalled similar grammatical constructions to the one in Romans 16:7 showing consistence with an inclusive reading, such as "But you, Bethlehem, in the land of Judah, are by no means least among the rulers of Judah" (Matt. 2:6; cf. Acts 4:34; 1 Peter 5:1).

=== Patristic reception ===
A common argument among Belleville, Bauckham, and Epp is that all native speakers of Koine Greek in the earliest years of Christianity read Paul's letter as describing Junia as an apostle. Bauckham writes that "writers such as Origen and John Chrysostom were educated native speakers of Greek. They had no reason for thinking Andronicus and Junia to be apostles other than supposing this to be the meaning of Paul's Greek."

=== Recent scholarship and reception ===
More recently, developing considerations made by Bauckham and Jewett on Paul describing Junia as being a follower of Christ before him, and raising further discussion on Paul's views on apostolic legitimacy, Yii-Jan Lin has additionally argued for Junia's apostolic status. Paul further describes Junia as having been a member of the early Christian community prior to him and as having been one of his compatriots.

Beth Allison Barr discusses the Junia dispute in her book The Making of Biblical Womanhood: How the Subjugation of Women Became Gospel Truth (2021). She quotes Beverly Roberts Gaventa and concludes "Junia became Junias because modern Christians assumed that only a man could be an apostle". Christine Schenk CSJ discusses the matter in her book Crispina and Her Sisters: Women and Authority in Early Christianity.

== Identification with Joanna the wife of Chuza ==
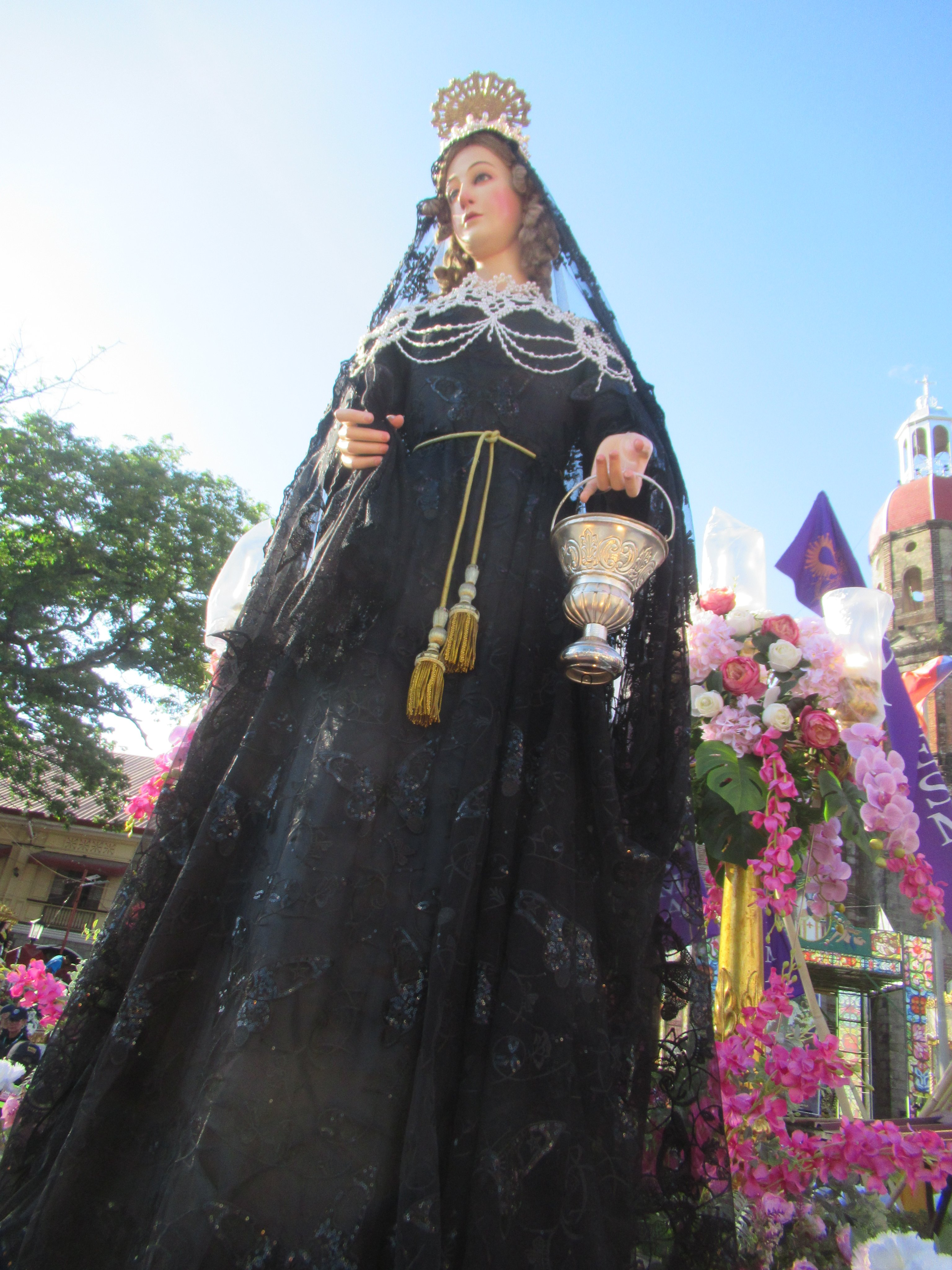
Junia (Joanna, wife of Chuza, 2024 Good Friday processions in Baliwag)

Richard Bauckham argues for identifying Junia with Joanna, the wife of Chuza, "Joanna" being her Jewish name, and "Junia" her Roman. Joanna the wife of Chuza is mentioned as one of the members of the ministry of Jesus in the Gospel of Luke, travelling with him among the other twelve and some other women, city to city.

After this, Jesus traveled about from one town and village to another, proclaiming the good news of the kingdom of God. The Twelve were with him, and also some women who had been cured of evil spirits and diseases: Mary (called Magdalene) from whom seven demons had come out; Joanna the wife of Chuza, the manager of Herod's household; Susanna; and many others. These women were helping to support them out of their own means. (Luke 8:1-3)

Joanna the wife of Chuza is also mentioned alongside Mary Magdalene and other women as those who first visited the tomb and found it to be empty, and it is to this group of women, including Joanna, that Jesus first appears and instructs them to tell the disciples to meet him in Galilee in Luke 24:1-10. Bauckham notes that Paul describes Junia as having been a member of the Christian community prior to him, and given that Paul himself converted within three years of the death of Jesus, that would require Junia to have been a member of the community from a very early period. Furthermore, whereas Joanna is a Hebrew name, Junia is a Latin name. Jews often had to adopt a second, Latin name that were nearly sound equivalents to their original name. Joanna and Junia act as near sound equivalents in the native languages, which Bauckham says is indicative of the identification between the two. Finally, Paul describes Junia as being "prominent among the apostles". Given that Junia is described as an earliest member of the community, and as one of the most prominent members, that she is not named elsewhere is indicative, as Bauckham argues, that she and Joanna are the same individual, given Joanna's high prominence during the ministry of Jesus.

== Orthodox views ==
Eastern Orthodox traditions hold that Junia and Andronicus of Pannonia traveled extensively and preached the Gospel to pagans, many of whom were converted to Christianity. Many of the pagan temples were closed, and in their place Christian churches were built. Junia and Andronicus are believed to have suffered martyrdom for Christ. The female identity of Junia was accepted without objection during the first twelve centuries of the church, according to the writings of the Church Fathers. Paul's "enthusiastic acclamation" of Junia prompted John Chrysostom, a prominent Church Father, to marvel at her apparent devotion such that "...she would be even counted worthy of the appellation of apostle."

== See also ==
- Deborah
- Feminist theology
- Lydia of Thyatira
- Phoebe
- Junia gens

== Notes ==
- Lampe, Peter (1995), "The Roman Christians of Romans 16", in K.P. Donfried (ed.), The Romans Debate, rev. ed., Hendrickson Publishers, p. 226, ISBN 978-1-56563-671-2
