= Mahallat Menouf =

Mahallat Menouf محلة منوف ⲡⲁⲛⲟⲩϥ ϧⲏⲧ
- Location in Egypt
- Coordinates: 30°52′59.81″N 30°57′58.51″E
- Country: Egypt
- Governorate: Gharbia
- Markaz: Tanta

Population
  - Total: 15,043
- Time zone: UTC+2 (EET)
  - Summer (DST): UTC+3 (EEST)

Mahallat Menouf (Arabic: محلة منوف) is a village in the Gharbia Governorate of Egypt.

== Etymology ==
The village was formerly known as Minuf as-Sufla (Arabic: منوف السفلى, lit. 'the lower Menouf'). It's derived from its Coptic name Panouf Khit (Coptic: ⲡⲁⲛⲟⲩϥ ϧⲏⲧ, lit. 'northern Panouf') and was used to indicate its location downriver in relation to the flow of the Nile River, a common way of identifying regions in Egypt. This name served to distinguish it from another city called Minuf al-Ulyah or "the upper Minuf".

The Coptic name "Panouf" have originated from the Ancient Egyptian name "pꜣ-jw-nfr", meaning "the good island". The Greek name for the city, Onouphis Kato (Ancient Greek: Ὀνουφις Κάτω, lit. 'lower Onouphis'), is also derived from the Egyptian name.
