= Eltisley =

Village in Cambridgeshire, England

Coordinates: 52.221°N 0.140°W

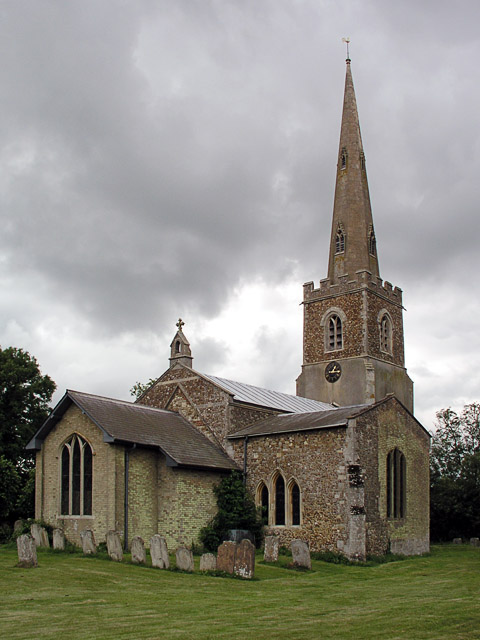
- Church of St Pandionia and St John the Baptist, Eltisley

- Location within Cambridgeshire
- Population: 390 (2022)
- OS grid reference: TL271596
  - London: 50 miles
- District: South Cambridgeshire
- Shire county: Cambridgeshire
- Region: East
- Country: England
- Sovereign state: United Kingdom
- Post town: ST NEOTS
- Postcode district: PE19
- Dialling code: 01480
- Police: Cambridgeshire
- Fire: Cambridgeshire
- Ambulance: East of England
- UK Parliament: St Neots and Mid Cambridgeshire

Eltisley is a village and civil parish in South Cambridgeshire, England, on the A428 road about 5.5 miles (8.9 km) east of St Neots and about 11 miles (18 km) west of the city of Cambridge. The population in 2022 was 390 people.

== History ==
The name 'Eltisley' hints at its origin as an Anglo-Saxon settlement among woodland. Eltisley (Hecteslei) is mentioned in the Domesday Book:

"In Longstow Hundred. The Canons of Bayeux hold 3 hides in Eltisley. Land for 9 ploughs. In lordship 1½ hides; 3 ploughs there; 6 villagers with 10 smallholders have 6 ploughs. 5 cottagers; 6 slaves. Meadow for 3 ploughs; woodland, 20 pigs. The total value is and always was £13. Earl Algar held this manor"..

Eltisley has a large village green, which is at the junction of two ancient roads running from Cambridge to St Neots and from St Ives to Potton. The church, dedicated to St Pandionia and St John the Baptist, stands immediately west of the green and several buildings from the 16th, 17th and 18th centuries stand along its edge, suggesting that the green has been at the centre of the village for a long time. In 1868 it was earmarked for parishioners' recreation and exercise, and cricket is played there in summer. Eltisley Cricket Club was established in 1854 and a thatched pavilion stands on the village green. In 1967 an episode of the ITV television series The Prisoner filmed location scenes featuring a cricket match, for the episode The Girl who was Death, on this green.

Until 1868, when it was turned into allotments, another green was sited to the east. It appears that there have been at least two centres to the village since medieval times, and in 1456, villagers were distinguished as living in either 'le Estende' or 'le Upende'.

Eighteenth-century diarist, John Byng toured through Eltisley in 1794, describing a scene of poverty and neglect. He described the village as 'a place so deplorable as I hope to be unmatched in Britain'. He met 'two male human beings - whose nakedness was not concealed by rags', and walked around 'the wretched church-yard'.

The parish's population doubled between 1801 and 1871, possibly because of its good road links. In addition to the St Neots–Cambridge and St Ives–Potton roads, the lane towards Caxton may also have been important (judging from its impact on that end of the village, which is known locally as Caxton End). After 1871 the population began to decline, and by 1961 only 253 people lived in Eltisley parish.

During World War II, several babies were born in Mill House on The Green in Eltisley, the local nurse–midwife, Mrs Nell Rose (1905-1990), having taken in pregnant mothers for their confinements. In 2000, the Eltisley Historical Society published The Eltisley Millennium Book, which records the history of the village and the village as it was in the year 2000.

There are no shops nor a post office in Eltisley. However, between 1855 and 1955, a post office was located in a house on the north side of The Green.

== Governance ==
Eltisley has a Parish Council. The parish is represented on the South Cambridgeshire District Council by two councillors for the Papworth Everard ward and on Cambridgeshire County Council by one councillor for the Papworth electoral division. It is in the parliamentary constituency of St Neots and Mid Cambridgeshire, represented in the House of Commons by Ian Sollom MP.

== Geography ==
Eltisley parish is on the border of the historic county of Huntingdonshire. Its borders are marked by isolated trees in many places, rather than following distinct geographical features.

Eltisley village is on the western edge of the parish, south of the A428 road 'Cambridge Road' west of its junction with the A1198 at the Caxton Gibbet roundabout. A road redevelopment scheme, which includes a realignment the A428 road to the north of the village, is expected to be completed by 2027.

The county town of Cambridge is 11 miles (18 km) to the east and the nearest town, St Neots, is 5.5 miles (8.9 km) west. London is 50 miles (80 km) south. Croxton is the next village west and Cambourne lies to the east. Papworth Everard is to the north along the B1040 and Waresley to the south.

The parish is largely flat and ranges from 47 to 65 metres above sea level. The soil is a heavy clay on gault which, coupled with the terrain, made drainage difficult. Eastern Brook flows towards Caxton and is a tributary of the Bourn Brook. Eltisley Wood had reached its modern state by the early 19th century; a small wood at Papley Grove, in the north of the parish, is presumably what is left of the woodland that belonged to the prioress of Hinchingbrooke.

== Transport ==
Eltisley has a limited-service bus connection to Cambridge. Bus No.X3 operates Mondays to Saturdays with one trip in each direction: leaving Eltisley early morning, returning from Cambridge late afternoon.

The shared-ride Tiger-on-demand mini-bus service is available in Eltisley, operating from Mondays to Saturdays only. This provides shared-vehicle trips in two 'Tiger' zones: the T10 zone in South Cambridgeshire includes rides between Eltisley and Cambourne; and the T11 zone in Huntingdonshire includes rides between Eltisley and St Neots.

The A428 St Neots to Cambridge road by-passes Eltisley just to the north of the village. The original Eltisley Northern Bypass, as the A45, opened in late May 1973.

A major road construction project is underway (2025) to take most of the A428 traffic further north onto a new dual carriageway. The new road (A421 from the Black Cat roundabout to Caxton Gibbet) is scheduled to open in 2027.

== Demography ==
At the time of the 2001 census, 421 people were resident in Eltisley parish. All were white; 75.7% described themselves as Christian, 0.7% followed another religion and 23.6% were not religious or did not state a religion.

== Landmarks ==
Two plaques in the churchyard's lych gate commemorate Eltisley men who were killed in the First and Second World Wars.

The archeological potential of Eltisley was the subject of a 2002 study. The report concluded that the likelihood of finding relevant remains in Eltisley was 'low' for pre-medieval periods, but 'high' for medieval and later periods.

Some 17 buildings and constructions in Eltisley are listed, including a red telephone box, a village pump and a mile stone on the St Ives road.

== Religious sites ==
By around 1230, Eltisley parish church was dedicated to Saint Pandionia (or Pandwyna), who was said to have been a nun in the parish in the 10th century. Robert Palmer, vicar in 1575, destroyed a well in the churchyard where St Pandionia's body was meant to have been buried originally (in 1576 he was accused of taking church paving for his own use, permitting the vicarage to be used as an ale-house and playing cards when he should have been in church). Her body was said to have been reburied in the church in 1344 and the dedication to St John the Baptist was added later.

In about 1645, Henry Denne, the Puritan Baptist cleric, was appointed vicar of Eltisley, and became an influential figure wishing for further reformation in the Church of England.

The oldest part of the current building, the aisled nave, dates from around 1200. The tower and spire were probably built around the 15th century. Robert Palmer may have defaced some monumental effigies during his incumbency and in 1644, William Dowsing destroyed a St Christopher. A strong gust of wind blew out the north window of the chapel in the 17th century and the whole north-west corner was rebuilt in the early 17th century. In 1878, £1,000 was spent on restoring the whole church. It is a Grade II* listed building.

In 1835 a Wesleyan Methodist chapel was constructed; in 1851 the congregation numbered 120 and 45 children came to Sunday school. In 1901 it could hold 140 people but was sold in 1964. A Primitive Methodist chapel was built near the green in 1846 and was still in use in 1968. In 1897, the vicar estimated that 40 out of 90 households in the parish were dissenters.
