= Storozhev =

Storozhev (Russian: Сторожев; masculine) or Storozheva (Сторожева; feminine) is a Russian surname shared by the following people:

- Nikita Storozhev, joint winner in the male vocal category of the 1978 International Tchaikovsky Competition
- Tatyana Storozheva (born 1954), Soviet hurdler
- Vera Storozheva (born 1958), Russian actress and film director

== See also ==
- Sabbas of Storozhev, Orthodox monk and saint
