= St. Nicholas of Sofia =

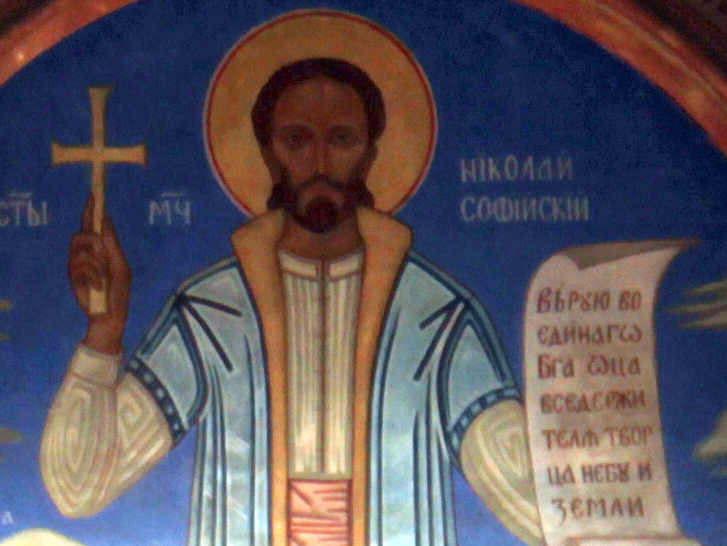
Saint Nikolas of Sofia church fresco

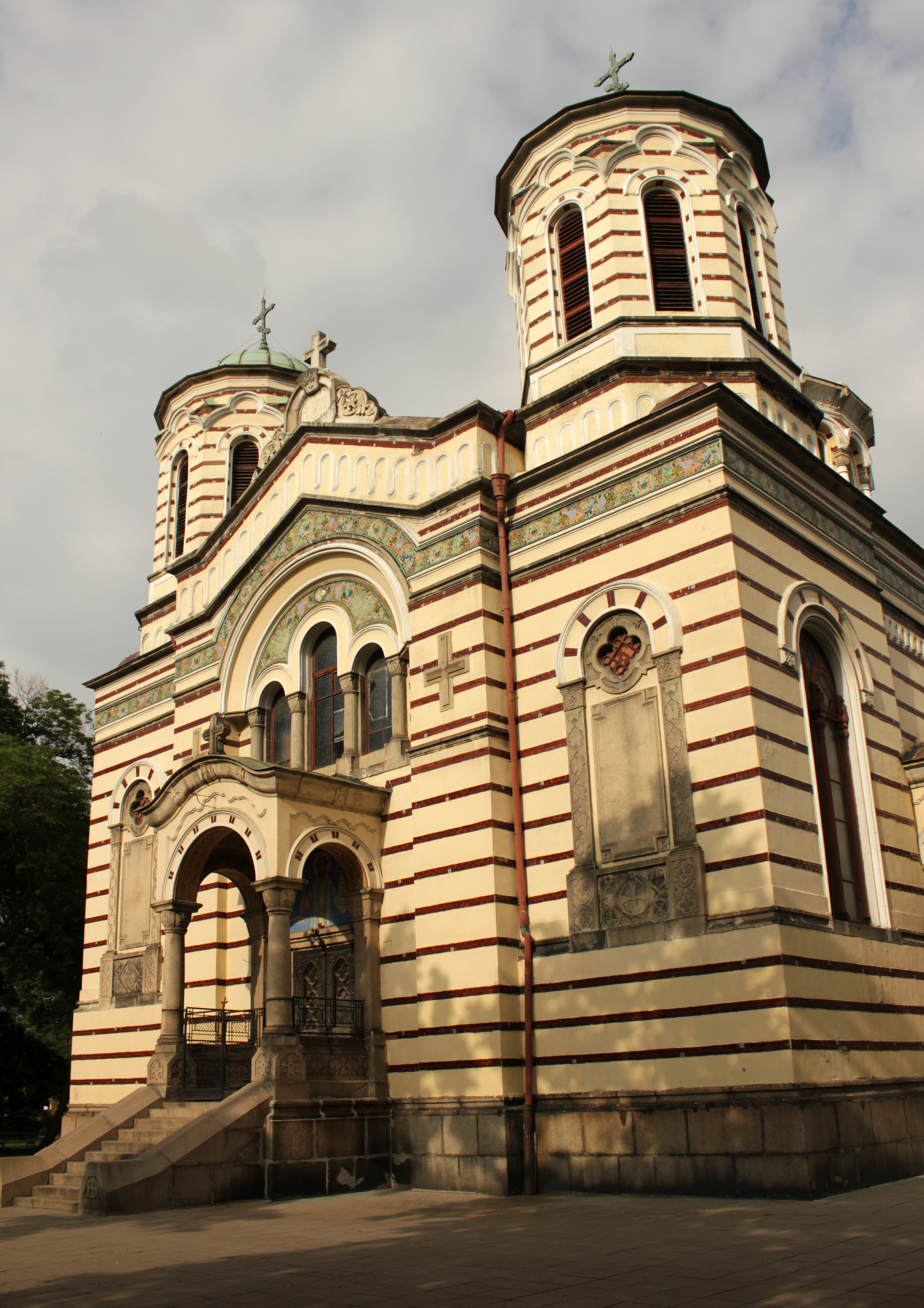
Saint Nikolas of Sofia church

St. Nicholas of Sofia the New (Bulgarian: Свети Николай Софийски Нови) is a Christian saint who lived in the 16th century in Sofia, Bulgaria and is considered a martyr in the Bulgarian Orthodox Church.

He is referred to as a New Martyr to signify that he died for his faith in the post-medieval period as opposed to the early martyrs who died primarily under the Romans. At the time of Nicholas' death, Bulgaria was under the rule of the Ottoman Empire, which compelled some locals to convert to Islam. On May 17, 1555, some local authorities brought Nicholas before a judge or qadi (Turkish kadı). Although he was freed by the qadi, Nicholas was attacked by a mob of townspeople and killed. In 1900, a large church named St. Nicholas of Sofia (Свети Николай Софийски) was constructed on Pirotska Street (at the corner of Opalchenska Street) in downtown Sofia.

The actual grave of the saint is located a few blocks northeast of the church at 125 Tsar Simeon Street. There is a historical plaque on the wall beside the entrance gate. Every year, on the saint's feast day, May 17, a small group of people gathers at the grave site to offer prayers in remembrance of St. Nicholas of Sofia. The traditional icon of the saint shows him dressed as a Roman soldier wearing a red cape and holding a martyr's cross, the former signifying spiritual warfare and the latter two iconographic elements signifying martyrdom.
