= Adrian of Ondrusov =

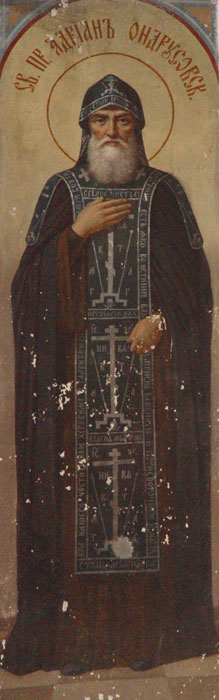
Icon of Saint Adrian of Ondrusov (Transfiguration Church, Alexander-Svirsky Monastery).

Venerable Adrian of Ondrusov (died August 26, 1549) was a Russian Orthodox monk and saint, venerated as a Wonderworker.

Born Andrew Zavalushin into a noble family, he was the owner of a rich estate (Andreevschina), which was located not far from the monastery of Saint Alexander of Svir. He accidentally encountered St Alexander while he was hunting in 1493, and after this often went to him for guidance, and helped supply the material needs for the ascetics. Eventually Andrew decided to enter the monastic life and was tonsured at Valaam Monastery on Lake Ladoga, receiving the religious name Adrian. Several years later, he received a blessing to live as a hermit on the peninsula of the Valaam archipelago.

Tsar Ivan the Terrible (1533–1584) developed a profound respect for Adrian, and endowed his monastic community. In August 1549, he asked Adrian to be the godfather for his daughter Anna. While he was returning from Moscow to his monastery, robbers killed him near the village of Obzha. This took place on August 26, which is the feast day of his own patron saint, Adrian of Nicomedia. Two years later, on May 17, 1551, his brethren found his remains and buried him in the wall of his church.

The memory of Saint Adrian of Ondrusov is celebrated twice during the year on the Orthodox liturgical calendar: The first is on the day of the finding and translation of his relics, May 17 (for those churches which follow the traditional Julian Calendar, May 17 currently falls on May 30 of the modern Gregorian Calendar). The second, and more important feast is on the day of his repose, August 26 (September 8).
