= Pandionia =

Saint Pandionia
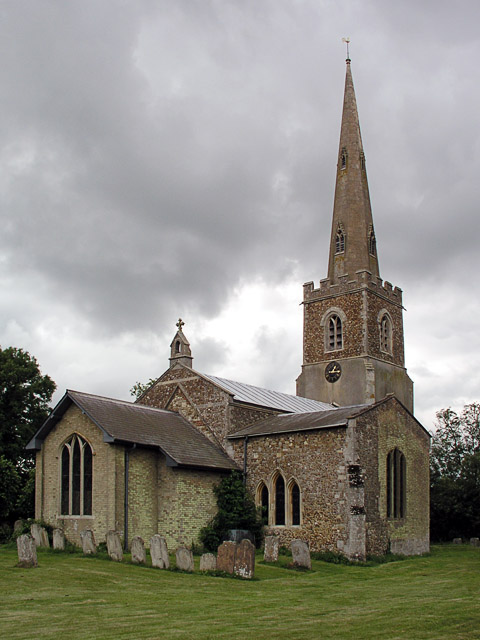
- The church of St Pandionia and St John the Baptist, Eltisley
- Born: Ireland or Scotland
- Died: c. 904
- Venerated in: Eltisley, Cambridgeshire, England
- Feast: 26 August

Pandionia (died c. 904; also known as Pandiona or Pandwyna) was an Anglo-Saxon nun and Christian saint, possibly a virgin martyr. Her feast day is 26 August.

== Life ==
Little is known about Pandionia, but by tradition she was the daughter of a minor Irish prince or Scottish king who fled to England to escape her father following persecution of her Christianity and her desire to serve God in celibacy. She sought refuge with a kinswoman who was prioress of a nunnery in Eltisley, Cambridgeshire and there became known for her holiness, though other sources suggest she lived for a time in Usselby, Lincolnshire. Following her death in around 904 she was buried near a well which bore her name, and canonized soon after.

In 1344 her remains were exhumed and reburied beneath the altar of the parish church in Eltisley, which is still dedicated to 'St Pandionia and St John the Baptist'. It is rare for a parish church to retain the relics of a saint, as the much wealthier monastic institutions would usually acquire them. In 1575, in the fervour of the Protestant Reformation which sought to rid the church's association with saints, the remains of her well were destroyed by the Rector Roger Palmer amid claims that they were the site of "idolatrous and popish practices". The site of the well is no longer known.
