= December 27 =

December 27 this year in various calendars
- Sunday, 27 December 2026
| Akan | Nkyikwasi |
| Armenian | 10 Arach 1476 |
| Aztec | Huei Tozoztli 6, 1 Quiyahuitl |
| Babylonian | 17 Kislimu, 2337 SE |
| Balinese pawukon | Menga, Kajeng, Sri, Pon, Urukung, Redite of Julungwangi, Sri, Dadi, Suka |
| Bengali | 12 Poush, BS 1433 |
| Chinese | Yin Wood Pig・Hairy Head Mansion; Fire Horse Year, Month 11, Day 19 (Dongzhi, 9 days until Xiaohan) |
| Common Era | 27 December 2026 CE |
| Coptic | 18 Koiak, AM 1743 |
| Egyptian | 15 Pachon, 2775 NE |
| Ethiopian | 18 Tākḫśāś, 2019 Amätä Məhrät |
| French Republican | Décade I, Sextidi de Nivôse de l'Année 235 de la République |
| Gregorian | 27 December, AD 2026 |
| Hebrew | 17 Tevet, AM 5787 |
| Hindu | Āśleṣā・Vaidhṛti; Solar: 12 Pauṣa, 1948 SE; Lunisolar: Caturthī, Kṛishna pakṣa of Mārgaśīrṣa, 2083 VE; Rāudra・5127 KY・1,872,936 |
| Icelandic | Sunnudagur, 5 Mörsugur 2026 |
| Islamic | 17 Rajab, AH 1448 (using tabular method) |
| ISO week date | 2026-W52-7 |
| Japanese | 19 Shimotsuki, Reiwa 8 (Tōji, 9 days until Shōkan) |
| Julian | 14 December, AD 2026 (AM 7535) |
| Julian day | 2461402 |
| Korean | 19 Jwidal, 4359 DE |
| Maya | 13.0.14.3.19; 12 Kankin, 1 Cauac |
| Roman | ante diem XIX Kalendas Ianuarias, MMDCCLXXX AUC |
| Solar Hijri | 6 Dey, SH 1405 |
| Tibetan | 19 mgo, me pho rta 2153 or 1772 or 1000 |

| << | December | | | | | >> |
| Su | Mo | Tu | We | Th | Fr | Sa |
| | | 1 | 2 | 3 | 4 | 5 |
| 6 | 7 | 8 | 9 | 10 | 11 | 12 |
| 13 | 14 | 15 | 16 | 17 | 18 | 19 |
| 20 | 21 | 22 | 23 | 24 | 25 | 26 |
| 27 | 28 | 29 | 30 | 31 |
2026

December 27 in recent years
2025 (Saturday)
2024 (Friday)
2023 (Wednesday)
2022 (Tuesday)
2021 (Monday)
2020 (Sunday)
2019 (Friday)
2018 (Thursday)
2017 (Wednesday)
2016 (Tuesday)

December 27 is the 361st day of the year (362nd in leap years) in the Gregorian calendar; four days remain until the end of the year.

== Events ==
=== Pre-1600 ===
- 537 – The second Hagia Sophia in Constantinople is consecrated.
- 1512 – The Spanish Crown issues the Laws of Burgos, governing the conduct of settlers with regard to native Indians in the New World.
- 1521 – The Zwickau prophets arrive in Wittenberg, disturbing the peace and preaching the Apocalypse.

=== 1601–1900 ===
- 1655 – Second Northern War/the Deluge: Monks at the Jasna Góra Monastery in Częstochowa are successful in fending off a month-long siege.
- 1657 – The Flushing Remonstrance articulates for the first time in North American history that freedom of religion is a fundamental right.
- 1688 – The Dutch Guards, commanded by Count Solms, enter London and occupy the Palace of Whitehall and St James's Palace, securing the capital for William of Orange during the 1688 invasion of England.
- 1703 – Portugal and England sign the Methuen Treaty which allows Portugal to export wines to England on favorable trade terms.
- 1814 – War of 1812: The destruction of the schooner USS Carolina brings to an end Commodore Daniel Patterson's makeshift fleet, which fought a series of delaying actions that contributed to Andrew Jackson's victory at the Battle of New Orleans.
- 1831 – Charles Darwin embarks on his journey aboard HMS Beagle, during which he will begin to formulate his theory of evolution.
- 1836 – The worst ever avalanche in England occurs at Lewes, Sussex, killing eight people.
- 1845 – Ether anesthetic is used for childbirth for the first time by Dr. Crawford Long in Jefferson, Georgia.
- 1845 – Having coined the phrase "manifest destiny" the previous July, journalist John L. O'Sullivan argued in his newspaper New York Morning News that the United States had the right to claim the entire Oregon Country.

=== 1901–present ===
- 1911 – "Jana Gana Mana", the national anthem of India, is first sung in the Calcutta Session of the Indian National Congress.
- 1918 – The Great Poland Uprising against the Germans begins.
- 1918 – Ukrainian War of Independence: The Revolutionary Insurgent Army of Ukraine occupies Yekaterinoslav and seizes seven airplanes from the UPRAF, establishing an Insurgent Air Fleet.
- 1922 – Japanese aircraft carrier Hōshō becomes the first purpose-built aircraft carrier to be commissioned in the world.
- 1927 – Kern and Hammerstein's musical play Show Boat, considered to be the first true American musical play, opens at the Ziegfeld Theatre on Broadway.
- 1929 – Soviet General Secretary Joseph Stalin orders the "liquidation of the kulaks as a class".
- 1932 – Radio City Music Hall, "Showplace of the Nation", opens in New York City.
- 1935 – Regina Jonas is ordained as the first female rabbi in the history of Judaism.
- 1939 – The 7.8 M_{w} Erzincan earthquake shakes eastern Turkey with a maximum Mercalli intensity of XI (Extreme). At least 32,700 people were killed.
- 1939 – Winter War: Finland holds off a Soviet attack in the Battle of Kelja.
- 1945 – The International Monetary Fund is created with the signing of an agreement by 29 nations.
- 1949 – Indonesian National Revolution: The Netherlands officially recognizes Indonesian independence. End of the Dutch East Indies.
- 1966 – The Cave of Swallows, the largest known cave shaft in the world, is discovered in Aquismón, San Luis Potosí, Mexico.
- 1968 – Apollo program: Apollo 8 splashes down in the Pacific Ocean, ending the first orbital crewed mission to the Moon.
- 1968 – North Central Airlines Flight 458 crashes at O'Hare International Airport, killing 28.
- 1978 – Spain becomes a democracy after 40 years of fascist dictatorship.
- 1983 – Pope John Paul II visits Mehmet Ali Ağca in Rebibbia's prison and personally forgives him for the 1981 attack on him in St. Peter's Square.
- 1985 – Palestinian guerrillas kill eighteen people inside the airports of Rome, Italy, and Vienna, Austria.
- 1989 – The Romanian Revolution concludes, as the last minor street confrontations and stray shootings abruptly end in the country's capital, Bucharest.
- 1991 – Scandinavian Airlines System Flight 751 crashes in Gottröra in the Norrtälje Municipality in Sweden, injuring 92.
- 1996 – Taliban forces retake the strategic Bagram Airfield which solidifies their buffer zone around Kabul, Afghanistan.
- 1997 – Protestant paramilitary leader Billy Wright is assassinated in Northern Ireland, United Kingdom.
- 1999 – Burger King and the U.S. Consumer Product Safety Commission order a recall of plastic Poké Ball containers after they are determined to be a choking hazard.
- 2002 – Two truck bombs kill 72 and wound 200 at the pro-Moscow headquarters of the Chechen government in Grozny, Chechnya, Russia.
- 2004 – Radiation from an explosion on the magnetar SGR 1806-20 reaches Earth. It is the brightest extrasolar event known to have been witnessed on the planet.
- 2007 – Former Pakistani prime minister Benazir Bhutto is assassinated in a shooting incident.
- 2007 – Riots erupt in Mombasa, Kenya, after Mwai Kibaki is declared the winner of the presidential election, triggering a political, economic, and humanitarian crisis.
- 2008 – Operation Cast Lead: Israel launches three-week operation on Gaza.
- 2009 – Iranian election protests: On the Day of Ashura in Tehran, Iran, government security forces fire upon demonstrators.
- 2019 – Bek Air Flight 2100 crashes during takeoff from Almaty International Airport in Almaty, Kazakhstan, killing 13.
- 2025 – An estimated €30 million were stolen from a Sparkasse bank in Gelsenkirchen, Germany.

== Births ==
=== Pre-1600 ===
- 1350 – John I of Aragon (died 1395)
- 1390 – Anne de Mortimer, claimant to the English throne (died 1411)
- 1459 – John I Albert, King of Poland (died 1501)
- 1481 – Casimir, Margrave of Brandenburg-Bayreuth, Margrave of Bayreuth (died 1527)
- 1493 – Johann Pfeffinger, German theologian (died 1573)
- 1566 – Jan Jesenius, Bohemian physician, politician and philosopher (died 1621)
- 1571 – Johannes Kepler, German mathematician, astronomer, and astrologer (died 1630)
- 1572 – Johannes Vodnianus Campanus, Czech poet, playwright, and composer (died 1622)
- 1584 – Philipp Julius, Duke of Pomerania (died 1625)
- 1595 – Bohdan Khmelnytsky, hetman of Ukraine (died 1657)

=== 1601–1900 ===
- 1622 – Teofil Rutka, Polish philosopher (died 1700)
- 1633 – Jean de Lamberville, French missionary (died 1714)
- 1636 – William Whitelock, English gentleman, Member of Parliament (died 1717)
- 1637 – Petar Kanavelić, Venetian writer (died 1719)
- 1645 – Giovanni Antonio Viscardi, Swiss architect (died 1713)
- 1655 – Abstrupus Danby, English politician (died 1727)
- 1660 – Veronica Giuliani, Italian Capuchin mystic (died 1727)
- 1663 – Johann Melchior Roos, German painter (died 1731)
- 1683 – Conyers Middleton, English priest and theologian (died 1750)
- 1689 – Jacob August Franckenstein, Encyclopedia editor, professor (died 1733)
- (baptised) 1692 – Francis Blake Delaval, British Royal Navy officer and Member of Parliament (died 1752)
- 1697 – Sollom Emlyn, Irish legal writer (died 1754)
- 1705 – Prince Frederick Henry Eugen of Anhalt-Dessau, German prince of the House of Ascania (died 1781)
- 1713 – Giovanni Battista Borra, Italian architect and engineer (died 1770)
- 1714 – George Whitefield, English preacher and saint (died 1770)
- 1715 – Philippe de Noailles, French general (died 1794)
- 1721 – François Hemsterhuis, Dutch philosopher and author (died 1790)
- (baptised) 1761 – Michael Andreas Barclay de Tolly, Russian field marshal and politician, Governor-General of Finland (died 1818)
- 1773 – George Cayley, English engineer and politician (died 1857)
- 1776 – Nikolay Kamensky, Russian general (died 1811)
- 1797 – Ghalib, Indian poet (died 1869)
- 1797 – Charles Hodge, American theologian (died 1878)
- 1803 – François-Marie-Thomas Chevalier de Lorimier, Canadian activist (died 1839)
- 1809 – Alexandros Rizos Rangavis, Greek poet and politician, Foreign Minister of Greece (died 1892)
- 1822 – Louis Pasteur, French chemist and microbiologist (died 1895)
- 1823 – Mackenzie Bowell, English-Canadian journalist and politician, 5th Prime Minister of Canada (died 1917)
- 1827 – Stanisław Mieroszewski, Polish-born politician, writer, historian and member of the Imperial Council of Austria (died 1900)
- 1832 – Pavel Tretyakov, Russian businessman and philanthropist, founded the Tretyakov Gallery (died 1897)
- 1838 – Lars Oftedal, Norwegian priest, social reformer, politician, and newspaper editor (died 1900)
- 1858 – Juan Luis Sanfuentes, Chilean lawyer and politician, 17th President of Chile (died 1930)
- 1863 – Louis Lincoln Emmerson, American lawyer and politician, 27th Governor of Illinois (died 1941)
- 1864 – Hermann-Paul, French painter and illustrator (died 1940)
- 1878 – Kalle Korhonen, Finnish politician (died 1938)
- 1879 – Sydney Greenstreet, English-American actor (died 1954)
- 1882 – Mina Loy, British modernist poet and artist (died 1966)
- 1883 – Cyrus S. Eaton, Canadian-American businessman and philanthropist (died 1979)
- 1888 – Thea von Harbou, German actress, director, and screenwriter (died 1954)
- 1892 – Alfred Edwin McKay, Canadian captain and pilot (died 1917)
- 1896 – Louis Bromfield, American author and theorist (died 1956)
- 1896 – Maurice De Waele, Belgian cyclist (died 1952)
- 1896 – Carl Zuckmayer, German author and playwright (died 1977)
- 1898 – Inejiro Asanuma, Japanese politician (died 1960)
- 1900 – Hans Stuck, German racing driver (died 1978)

=== 1901–present ===
- 1901 – Marlene Dietrich, German-American actress and singer (died 1992)
- 1901 – Irene Handl, English actress (died 1987)
- 1904 – René Bonnet, French racing driver and engineer (died 1983)
- 1905 – Cliff Arquette, American actor and comedian (died 1974)
- 1906 – Oscar Levant, American pianist, composer, and actor (died 1972)
- 1907 – Asaf Halet Çelebi, Turkish poet (died 1958)
- 1907 – Sebastian Haffner, German journalist and author (died 1999)
- 1907 – Mary Howard, English author (died 1991)
- 1907 – Conrad L. Raiford, American baseball player and activist (died 2002)
- 1907 – Willem van Otterloo, Dutch conductor and composer (died 1978)
- 1909 – James Riddell, English skier and author (died 2000)
- 1910 – Charles Olson, American poet and educator (died 1970)
- 1911 – Anna Russell, English-Canadian singer and actress (died 2006)
- 1913 – Elizabeth Smart, Canadian poet and novelist (died 1986)
- 1915 – William Masters, American gynecologist, author, and academic (died 2001)
- 1915 – Gyula Zsengellér, Hungarian-Cypriot footballer and manager (died 1999)
- 1916 – Werner Baumbach, German pilot (died 1953)
- 1916 – Cathy Lewis, American actress (died 1968)
- 1917 – Buddy Boudreaux, American saxophonist and clarinet player (died 2015)
- 1917 – T. Nadaraja, Sri Lankan lawyer and academic (died 2004)
- 1917 – Onni Palaste, Finnish soldier and author (died 2009)
- 1918 – John Celardo, American captain and illustrator (died 2012)
- 1919 – Charles Sweeney, American general and pilot (died 2004)
- 1920 – Bruce Hobbs, American jockey and trainer (died 2005)
- 1921 – John Whitworth, English countertenor (died 2013)
- 1923 – Bruno Bobak, Polish-Canadian painter and educator (died 2012)
- 1923 – Lucas Mangope, South African politician (died 2018)
- 1924 – Jean Bartik, American computer scientist and engineer (died 2011)
- 1924 – James A. McClure, American soldier, lawyer, and politician (died 2011)
- 1925 – Michel Piccoli, French actor, singer, director, and producer (died 2020)
- 1926 – Jerome Courtland, American actor, director, and producer (died 2012)
- 1927 – Antony Gardner, English engineer and politician (died 2011)
- 1927 – Nityanand Swami, Indian lawyer and politician, 1st Chief Minister of Uttarakhand (died 2012)
- 1927 – Audrey Wagner, American baseball player, obstetrician, and gynecologist (died 1984)
- 1930 – Marshall Sahlins, American anthropologist and academic (died 2021)
- 1930 – Wilfrid Sheed, English-born American novelist and essayist (died 2011)
- 1931 – Scotty Moore, American guitarist and songwriter (died 2016)
- 1933 – Dave Marr, American golfer (died 1997)
- 1934 – Larisa Latynina, Ukrainian gymnast and coach
- 1934 – Jeffrey Sterling, Baron Sterling of Plaistow, English businessman
- 1935 – Michael Turnbull, English bishop
- 1936 – James Harrison, Australian blood plasma donor (died 2025)
- 1936 – Phil Sharpe, English cricketer (died 2014)
- 1936 – Eve Uusmees, Estonian swimmer and coach (died 2026)
- 1939 – John Amos, American actor (died 2024)
- 1940 – David Shepherd, English cricketer and umpire (died 2009)
- 1941 – Miles Aiken, American basketball player and coach
- 1941 – Mike Pinder, English singer-songwriter and keyboard player (died 2024)
- 1941 – Nolan Richardson, American basketball player and coach
- 1942 – Byron Browne, American baseball player
- 1942 – Thomas Menino, American politician, 53rd Mayor of Boston (died 2014)
- 1942 – Ron Rothstein, American basketball player and coach
- 1943 – Cokie Roberts, American journalist and author (died 2019)
- 1943 – Joan Manuel Serrat, Spanish singer-songwriter and guitarist
- 1943 – Peter Sinfield, English songwriter and producer (died 2024)
- 1943 – Roy White, American baseball player and coach
- 1944 – Mick Jones, English guitarist, songwriter, and producer
- 1946 – Lenny Kaye, American guitarist, songwriter, and producer
- 1946 – Joe Kinnear, Irish footballer and manager (died 2024)
- 1946 – Janet Street-Porter, English journalist and producer
- 1946 – Polly Toynbee, English journalist and author
- 1947 – Bill Eadie, American wrestler and coach
- 1947 – Doug Livermore, English footballer and manager
- 1947 – Willy Polleunis, Belgian runner
- 1948 – Gérard Depardieu, French-Russian actor
- 1949 – Terry Ito, Japanese director, producer, and critic
- 1950 – Haris Alexiou, Greek singer-songwriter
- 1950 – Roberto Bettega, Italian footballer and manager
- 1950 – Terry Bozzio, American drummer and songwriter
- 1951 – Karla Bonoff, American singer-songwriter
- 1951 – Ernesto Zedillo, Mexican economist and politician, 54th President of Mexico
- 1952 – Jay Hill, Canadian farmer and politician
- 1952 – David Knopfler, Scottish singer-songwriter, guitarist, and producer
- 1954 – Kent Benson, American basketball player
- 1954 – Mandie Fletcher, English director, producer, and production manager
- 1954 – Teo Chee Hean, Singaporean politician and 5th Senior Minister of Singapore
- 1955 – Brad Murphey, American race car driver
- 1955 – Barbara Olson, American journalist and author (died 2001)
- 1956 – Doina Melinte, Romanian runner
- 1958 – Steve Jones, American golfer
- 1959 – Gerina Dunwich, American astrologer, historian, and author
- 1959 – Andre Tippett, American football player and coach
- 1960 – Maryam d'Abo, English actress
- 1960 – Donald Nally, American conductor and academic
- 1960 – Terry Price, Australian golfer
- 1961 – Guido Westerwelle, German lawyer and politician, 15th Vice-Chancellor of Germany (died 2016)
- 1962 – Mark Few, American basketball player and coach
- 1962 – John Kampfner, Singaporean journalist and author
- 1962 – Bill Self, American basketball player and coach
- 1962 – Sherri Steinhauer, American golfer
- 1963 – Gaspar Noé, Argentine-French director and screenwriter
- 1964 – Ian Gomez, American actor
- 1964 – Theresa Randle, American actress
- 1965 – Salman Khan, Indian film actor and producer
- 1966 – Marianne Elliott, English director and producer
- 1966 – Bill Goldberg, American football player, wrestler and actor
- 1966 – Eva LaRue, American model and actress
- 1969 – Jean-Christophe Boullion, French racing driver
- 1969 – Chyna, American professional wrestler and actress (died 2016)
- 1969 – Sarah Vowell, American author and journalist
- 1970 – Lorenzo Neal, American football player and radio host
- 1970 – Naoko Yamazaki, Japanese pilot and astronaut
- 1971 – Duncan Ferguson, Scottish footballer and coach
- 1971 – Guthrie Govan, English guitarist and educator
- 1971 – Savannah Guthrie, American television journalist
- 1971 – Bryan Smolinski, American ice hockey player
- 1972 – Colin Charvis, Welsh rugby union player and coach
- 1972 – Kevin Ollie, American basketball player and coach
- 1972 – Matt Slocum, American guitarist and songwriter
- 1973 – Wilson Cruz, American actor
- 1973 – Kristoffer Zegers, Dutch pianist and composer
- 1974 – Tomáš Janků, Czech high jumper
- 1974 – Masi Oka, Japanese-American actor and visual effects designer
- 1974 – Fumiko Orikasa, Japanese voice actress and singer
- 1974 – Jay Pandolfo, American ice hockey player and coach
- 1975 – Aigars Fadejevs, Latvian race walker and therapist
- 1975 – Heather O'Rourke, American actress (died 1988)
- 1976 – Nikolaos Georgeas, Greek footballer
- 1976 – Piotr Morawski, Polish mountaineer (died 2009)
- 1976 – Daimí Pernía, Cuban basketball player and hurdler
- 1976 – Fernando Pisani, Canadian-Italian ice hockey player
- 1977 – Jacqueline Pillon, Canadian actress
- 1977 – Chris Tate, English footballer
- 1978 – Deuce McAllister, American football player
- 1978 – Lisa Jakub, Canadian actress
- 1979 – Pascale Dorcelus, Canadian weightlifter
- 1979 – David Dunn, English footballer and manager
- 1979 – Carson Palmer, American football player
- 1980 – Bernard Berrian, American football player
- 1980 – Claudio Castagnoli, Swiss wrestler
- 1980 – Dahntay Jones, American basketball player
- 1980 – Meelis Kompus, Estonian journalist
- 1981 – David Aardsma, American baseball player
- 1981 – Emilie de Ravin, Australian actress
- 1981 – Jay Ellis, American actor
- 1981 – Moise Joseph, American-Haitian runner
- 1981 – Patrick Sharp, Canadian ice hockey player
- 1982 – Erin E. Stead, American illustrator
- 1983 – Anthony Boric, New Zealand rugby union player
- 1983 – Cole Hamels, American baseball player
- 1983 – Jesse Williams, American high jumper
- 1984 – Andrejs Perepļotkins, Ukrainian-Latvian footballer
- 1984 – Gilles Simon, French tennis player
- 1985 – Logan Bailly, Belgian footballer
- 1985 – Jérôme d'Ambrosio, Belgian racing driver
- 1985 – Adil Rami, French footballer
- 1985 – Paul Stastny, Canadian-American ice hockey player
- 1986 – Torah Bright, Australian snowboarder
- 1986 – Jamaal Charles, American football player
- 1986 – Shelly-Ann Fraser-Pryce, Jamaican sprinter
- 1987 – Lily Cole, English model
- 1988 – Jorge Gutiérrez, Mexican basketball player
- 1988 – Hera Hilmar, Icelandic actress
- 1988 – Zavon Hines, Jamaican-English footballer
- 1988 – Ok Taec-yeon, South Korean singer and actor
- 1988 – Rick Porcello, American baseball player
- 1988 – Hayley Williams, American singer-songwriter
- 1989 – Ingrid Várgas Calvo, Peruvian tennis player
- 1990 – Max Lindholm, Finnish figure skater
- 1990 – Jonathan Marchessault, Canadian ice hockey player
- 1990 – Milos Raonic, Canadian tennis player
- 1990 – Zelina Vega, American wrestler
- 1991 – Chloe Bridges, American actress
- 1991 – Michael Morgan, Australian rugby league player
- 1991 – Beth Potter, Scottish triathlete and long-distance runner
- 1991 – Danny Wilson, Scottish footballer
- 1992 – Joel Indermitte, Estonian footballer
- 1992 – Maicel Uibo, Estonian decathlete
- 1993 – Olivia Cooke, English actress
- 1994 – Isi Palazón, Spanish footballer
- 1995 – Timothée Chalamet, French-American actor
- 1995 – Nick Chubb, American football player
- 1995 – Ghislain Konan, Ivorian footballer
- 1995 – Mark Lapidus, Estonian chess player
- 1997 – Mads Juel Andersen, Danish footballer
- 1997 – Vachirawit Chivaaree, Thai actor and singer
- 1997 – Ana Konjuh, Croatian tennis player
- 1997 – Jang Gyu-ri, South Korean actress
- 1998 – Luka Garza, American basketball player
- 1999 – Brock Purdy, American football player
- 2001 – Ander Barrenetxea, Spanish footballer

== Deaths ==
=== Pre-1600 ===
- 683 – Gaozong of Tang, 3rd emperor of the Chinese Tang dynasty (born 628)
- 870 – Aeneas of Paris, Frankish bishop
- 975 – Balderic, bishop of Utrecht (born 897)
- 1003 – Emma of Blois, French duchess and regent
- 1005 – Nilus the Younger, Byzantine abbot (born 910)
- 1076 – Sviatoslav II, Grand Prince of Kiev (born 1027)
- 1087 – Bertha of Savoy, Holy Roman Empress (born 1051)
- 1381 – Edmund Mortimer, 3rd Earl of March, English politician (born 1352)
- 1518 – Mahmood Shah Bahmani II, sultan of the Bahmani Sultanate (born c. 1470)
- 1543 – George, margrave of Brandenburg-Ansbach (born 1484)
- 1548 – Francesco Spiera, Italian lawyer and jurist (born 1502)

=== 1601–1900 ===
- 1603 – Thomas Cartwright, English minister and theologian (born 1535)
- 1637 – Vincenzo Giustiniani, Italian banker (born 1564)
- 1641 – Francis van Aarssens, Dutch diplomat (born 1572)
- 1642 – Herman op den Graeff, Dutch bishop (born 1585)
- 1656 – Andrew White, English Jesuit missionary (born 1579)
- 1660 – Hervey Bagot, English politician (born 1591)
- 1663 – Christine of France, Duchess of Savoy (born 1606)
- 1672 – Jacques Rohault, French philosopher (born 1618)
- 1683 – Maria Francisca of Savoy, Queen consort of Portugal (born 1646)
- 1689 – Gervase Bryan, English clergyman (born 1622)
- 1693 – Henri de Villars, French prelate (born 1621)
- 1694 – Henrik Span, naval officer in the Dutch (born 1634)
- 1704 – Hans Albrecht von Barfus, Prussian field marshal and politician (born 1635)
- 1707 – Jean Mabillon, French monk and scholar (born 1632)
- 1707 – Robert Leke, 3rd Earl of Scarsdale, English earl, politician (born 1654)
- 1737 – William Bowyer, English printer (born 1663)
- 1743 – Hyacinthe Rigaud, French painter (born 1659)
- 1771 – Henri Pitot, French engineer, invented the Pitot tube (born 1695)
- 1776 – Johann Rall, Hessian colonel (born c. 1726)
- 1782 – Henry Home, Lord Kames, Scottish judge and philosopher (born 1697)
- 1800 – Hugh Blair, Scottish minister and author (born 1718)
- 1812 – Joanna Southcott, English religious leader (born 1750)
- 1834 – Charles Lamb, English essayist and poet (born 1775)
- 1836 – Stephen F. Austin, American soldier and politician (born 1793)
- 1858 – Alexandre Pierre François Boëly, French pianist and composer (born 1785)
- 1895 – Eivind Astrup, Norwegian explorer (born 1871)
- 1896 – John Brown, English businessman and politician (born 1816)
- 1900 – William Armstrong, 1st Baron Armstrong, English engineer and businessman, founded Armstrong Whitworth (born 1810)

=== 1901–present ===
- 1914 – Charles Martin Hall, American chemist and engineer (born 1863)
- 1919 – Achilles Alferaki, Russian-Greek composer and politician, Governor of Taganrog (born 1846)
- 1923 – Gustave Eiffel, French architect and engineer, co-designed the Eiffel Tower (born 1832)
- 1924 – Agda Meyerson, Swedish nurse and healthcare activist (born 1866)
- 1936 – Mehmet Akif Ersoy, Turkish poet, academic, and politician (born 1873)
- 1938 – Calvin Bridges, American geneticist and academic (born 1889)
- 1938 – Osip Mandelstam, Polish-Russian poet and critic (born 1891)
- 1938 – Zona Gale, American novelist, short story writer, and playwright (born 1874)
- 1939 – Rinaldo Cuneo, American painter (born 1877)
- 1943 – Ants Kurvits, Estonian general and politician, 10th Estonian Minister of War (born 1887)
- 1950 – Max Beckmann, German-American painter and sculptor (born 1884)
- 1952 – Patrick Joseph Hartigan, Australian priest, author, and educator (born 1878)
- 1953 – Şükrü Saracoğlu, Turkish soldier and politician, 6th Prime Minister of Turkey (born 1887)
- 1953 – Julian Tuwim, Polish poet and author (born 1894)
- 1955 – Alfred Carpenter, English admiral, Victoria Cross recipient (born 1881)
- 1956 – Lambert McKenna, Irish priest and lexicographer (born 1870)
- 1965 – Edgar Ende, German painter (born 1901)
- 1972 – Lester B. Pearson, Canadian historian and politician, 14th Prime Minister of Canada, Nobel Prize laureate (born 1897)
- 1974 – Vladimir Fock, Russian physicist and mathematician (born 1898)
- 1974 – Amy Vanderbilt, American author (born 1908)
- 1978 – Chris Bell, American singer-songwriter and guitarist (born 1951)
- 1978 – Houari Boumediene, Algerian colonel and politician, 2nd President of Algeria (born 1932)
- 1978 – Bob Luman, American singer-songwriter and guitarist (born 1937)
- 1979 – Hafizullah Amin, Afghan educator and politician, 2nd General Secretary of the People's Democratic Party of Afghanistan (born 1929)
- 1981 – Hoagy Carmichael, American singer-songwriter, pianist, and actor (born 1899)
- 1982 – Jack Swigert, American pilot, astronaut, and politician (born 1931)
- 1985 – Jean Rondeau, French racing driver (born 1946)
- 1986 – George Dangerfield, English-American historian and journalist (born 1904)
- 1986 – Dumas Malone, American historian and author (born 1892)
- 1987 – Rewi Alley, New Zealand writer and political activist (born 1897)
- 1988 – Hal Ashby, American director and producer (born 1929)
- 1992 – Kay Boyle, American novelist, poet, and educator (born 1902)
- 1993 – Feliks Kibbermann, Estonian chess player and philologist (born 1902)
- 1993 – Evald Mikson, Estonian footballer (born 1911)
- 1993 – André Pilette, Belgian racing driver (born 1918)
- 1994 – Fanny Cradock, English author and critic (born 1909)
- 1994 – J. B. L. Reyes, Filipino lawyer and jurist (born 1902)
- 1995 – Shura Cherkassky, Ukrainian-American pianist (born 1909)
- 1995 – Genrikh Kasparyan, Armenian chess player and composer (born 1910)
- 1997 – Brendan Gill, American journalist and essayist (born 1914)
- 1997 – Billy Wright, Northern Irish loyalist leader (born 1960)
- 1999 – Michael McDowell, American author and screenwriter (born 1950)
- 2002 – George Roy Hill, American actor, director, producer, and screenwriter (born 1921)
- 2003 – Alan Bates, English actor (born 1934)
- 2003 – Iván Calderón, Puerto Rican-American baseball player (born 1962)
- 2004 – Hank Garland, American guitarist (born 1930)
- 2007 – Benazir Bhutto, Pakistani politician, Prime Minister of Pakistan (born 1953)
- 2007 – Jerzy Kawalerowicz, Polish director and screenwriter (born 1922)
- 2007 – Jaan Kross, Estonian author and poet (born 1920)
- 2008 – Delaney Bramlett, American singer-songwriter, guitarist, and producer (born 1939)
- 2008 – Robert Graham, Mexican-American sculptor (born 1938)
- 2009 – Isaac Schwartz, Ukrainian-Russian composer and educator (born 1923)
- 2011 – Catê, Brazilian footballer and manager (born 1973)
- 2011 – Michael Dummett, English soldier, philosopher, and academic (born 1925)
- 2011 – Helen Frankenthaler, American painter and educator (born 1928)
- 2011 – Johnny Wilson, Canadian-American ice hockey player and coach (born 1929)
- 2012 – Harry Carey, Jr., American actor, producer, and screenwriter (born 1921)
- 2012 – Lloyd Charmers, Jamaican singer, keyboard player, and producer (born 1938)
- 2012 – Tingye Li, Chinese-American physicist and engineer (born 1931)
- 2012 – Archie Roy, Scottish astronomer and academic (born 1924)
- 2012 – Norman Schwarzkopf, Jr., American general and engineer (born 1934)
- 2012 – Salt Walther, American race car driver (born 1947)
- 2013 – Richard Ambler, English-Scottish biologist and academic (born 1933)
- 2013 – Mohamad Chatah, Lebanese economist and politician, Lebanese Minister of Finance (born 1951)
- 2013 – Gianna D'Angelo, American soprano and educator (born 1929)
- 2013 – John Matheson, Canadian colonel, lawyer, and politician (born 1917)
- 2013 – Farooq Sheikh, Indian actor, philanthropist and a popular television presenter (born 1948)
- 2014 – Ben Ammi Ben-Israel, American-Israeli religious leader, founded the African Hebrew Israelites of Jerusalem (born 1939)
- 2014 – Ulises Estrella, Ecuadorian poet and academic (born 1939)
- 2014 – Ronald Li, Hong Kong accountant and businessman (born 1929)
- 2014 – Karel Poma, Belgian bacteriologist and politician (born 1920)
- 2015 – Stein Eriksen, Norwegian-American skier (born 1927)
- 2015 – Dave Henderson, American baseball player and sportscaster (born 1958)
- 2015 – Ellsworth Kelly, American painter and sculptor (born 1923)
- 2015 – Meadowlark Lemon, American basketball player and minister (born 1932)
- 2015 – Alfredo Pacheco, Salvadoran footballer (born 1982)
- 2015 – Stevie Wright, English-Australian singer-songwriter (born 1947)
- 2016 – Carrie Fisher, American actress, screenwriter, author, producer, and speaker (born 1956)
- 2016 – Ratnasiri Wickremanayake, Sri Lankan politician (born 1933)
- 2018 – Frank Blaichman, Polish resistance fighter (born 1922)
- 2019 – Maria Creveling, American League of Legends player (born 1995)
- 2023 – Lee Sun-kyun, South Korean actor (born 1975)
- 2023 – Gaston Glock, Austrian firearm engineer and founder of Glock (born 1929)
- 2024 – Greg Gumbel, American sportscaster (born 1946)
- 2024 – Olivia Hussey, Argentinian-English actress (born 1951)
- 2024 – Charles Shyer, American director, producer, and screenwriter (born 1941)

== Holidays and observances ==
- Christian feast day:
  - Blessed Francesco Spoto
  - Blessed Sára Salkaházi
  - Fabiola
  - John the Apostle
  - Pope Maximus of Alexandria
  - Nicarete
  - Theodorus and Theophanes
  - December 27 (Eastern Orthodox liturgics)
- Constitution Day (North Korea)
- Emergency Rescuer's Day (Russia)
- Saint Stephen's Day (Eastern Orthodox Church; a public holiday in Romania)
- The third of the Twelve Days of Christmas (Western Christianity)
