= December 14 (Eastern Orthodox liturgics) =

Day in the Eastern Orthodox liturgical calendar

Eastern Orthodox liturgical calendar
December 13	December 14	December 15
December 14 O.S. ≍ December 27 N.S. December 14 N.S ≍ December 1 O.S.

An Eastern Orthodox cross

December 14 in Eastern Orthodox liturgical calendars is a feast day and a day of commemoration of saints and martyrs. Although some Orthodox churches use the Revised Julian Calendar and others use the traditional Julian calendar, the fixed commemorations for their respective December 14 are broadly the same, no matter which calendar is used. (Note: Despite the dates being the same, the days to which they refer typically differ by 13 days. The notation Old Style or O.S. is sometimes used to indicate a date in the traditional Julian Calendar (the "Old Calendar"). The notation New Style or N.S. indicates a date in the Revised Julian calendar (the "New Calendar").)

== Saints ==
- Martyrs Thyrsus, Leucius, and Callinicus (Coronatus), with others, of Bithynia (c. 250)
- Martyrs Apollonius, Philemon, Arianus, Theoctychus, and four guards converted by Saint Arianus, at Alexandria (c. 305)
- Martyr Hypatius, and 36 martyrs with him, from the Thebaid in Egypt (Note: He is unknown in the Synaxarion of St. Nicodemus and in the printed Menaia. However his memory is preserved in Parisian Codex 1590, along with that of Philemon and Apollo († 14 December).)

== Pre-Schism Western saints ==
- Martyrs Justus and Abundius (283) (Note: Martyrs in Spain under Numerian. After a futile attempt to burn them at the stake, they were beheaded.)
- Saint Pompeius, Bishop of Pavia in Italy (c. 290)
- Saint Matronian, born in Milan, he became a hermit; his relics were enshrined by Saint Ambrose.
- Saint Viator, an early Bishop of Bergamo in Italy from 344 to 378 (378).
- Hieromartyr Nicasius (Nicaise), Bishop of Rheims in France, with his sister Eutropia and Companions (407)
- Saints Fingar (Gwinear) and Phiala, brother and sister, and Companions, martyrs in Cornwall (5th century) (Note: "ST. FINGAR and his sister were children of one of the Kings of Ireland, and were converted to the Faith, it is said, by the preaching of St. Patrick. They were driven into exile by their father's hostility to Christianity, and found their first place of refuge in Brittany, according to the tradition of that province. They were graciously welcomed by Andrew, the prince of the land, and provided with a place for their settlement. After a time, however, they and their companions resolved to establish themselves in Great Britain, either to secure greater solitude, or, as some say, to preach the Gospel to the English, who were then beginning to occupy the country. Their pious intention earned for them the crown of martyrdom, for they had scarcely landed near Hayle, in Cornwall, when they were attacked by Tewdrick, the pagan King of the Damnonians, and put to death in hatred of the Faith. St. Fingar is honoured in the Cathedral of Vannes on the 14th of December, and has given his name to places in that diocese, and in Leon.")
- Saint Agnellus, a hermit and then Abbot of San Gaudioso near Naples in Italy (c. 596). (Note: He is one of the patron-saints of the city and was often seen to free the city from its enemies by the power of the cross.)
- Saint Venantius Fortunatus, Bishop of Poitiers (600-609) (Note: Born near Treviso in the north of Italy, aged thirty he settled in Poiters in France and was ordained. He became known to Queen St. Radegunde who befriended him. He was a writer and poet: the hymns Vexilla Regis and Pange Lingua Gloriosa were composed by him. He became Bishop of Poitiers at the end of the 6th century.)
- Saint Hygbald (Hybald, Hibald), abbot in Lincolnshire in England to whom several churches are dedicated, notably at Hibaldstow (c. 690) (Note: Stanton lists him on September 18th, as follows: "St. Bede relates that HYGBALD was a most holy and mortified man, and Abbot of some place not named in Lindsey, the northern district of Lincolnshire. On one occasion he went over to Ireland and paid a visit to St. Egbert, who was still in his retreat at Rathmelsegi. Their conversation turned on the graces and virtues of St. Chad, who not long before had been taken to a better life, when St. Egbert told his saintly guest, that at the moment of St. Chad's death some one in Ireland, probably meaning himself, had seen the soul of St. Cedd, with a troop of Angels, descend to carry the soul of his brother to the heavenly kingdom. The veneration in which St. Hygbald was held is testified by several churches dedicated in his honour in Lincolnshire.")
- Saint Folcwin (Folciunus), Bishop of Thérouanne (Tervas), Netherlands (855)

== Post-Schism Orthodox saints ==
- Saint Leucius, founder of the Dormition Hermitage, Volokolamsk (1492)
- Venerable Daniel the Hesychast of Voronej (17th century)
- Saint Hilarion, Metropolitan of Suzdal and Yuriev (1707)
- Saint John of Sezenovo Convent, Recluse, fool-for-Christ (1839)

=== New martyrs and confessors ===
- New Hieromartyr Nicholas Kovalev, Priest of Alma-Ata (1937)
- New Hiero-Confessor Bassian Pyatnitsky, Archbishop of Tambov (1940) (Note: See: (in Russian) Вассиан (Пятницкий). Википедии. (Russian Wikipedia).)

== Other commemorations ==
- Sunday of the Holy Forefathers of Jesus Christ (December 11–17)
- Commemoration of the Constantinople earthquake of 557 (Note: This great earthquake, described in the works of Agathias, John Malalas and Theophanes the Confessor, caused great damage to Constantinople, then capital of the Byzantine Empire. According to their accounts, it had a duration of up to ten days.)
- Repose of Elder Maxim Yugov of Vologda (1906)

== Icon gallery ==
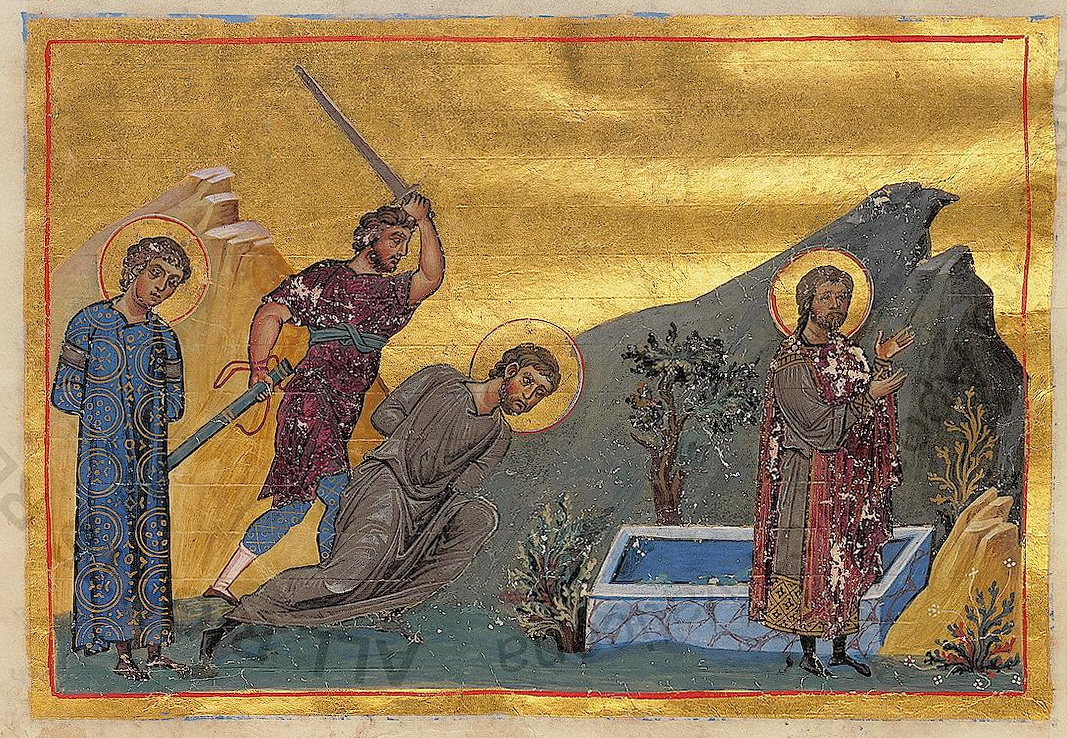
Martyrs Thyrsus, Leucius, and Callinicus (Coronatus), with others, of Bithynia.
(Menologion of Basil II, 10th century).

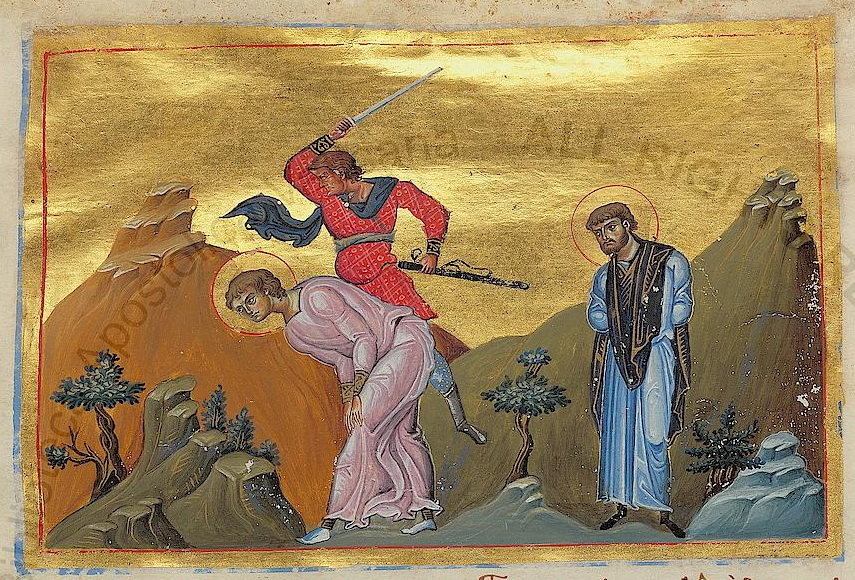
Martyrs Philemon and Apollonius.
(Menologion of Basil II, 10th century).

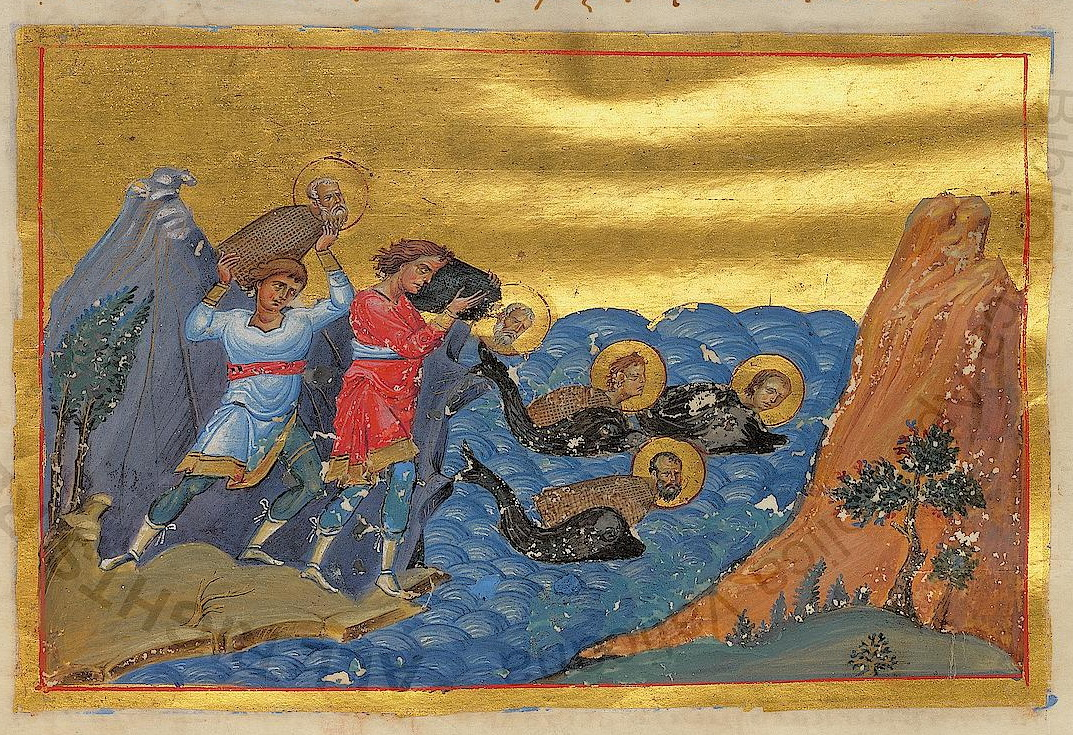
Martyr Arianus, and four guards converted by him, at Alexandria.
(Menologion of Basil II, 10th century).

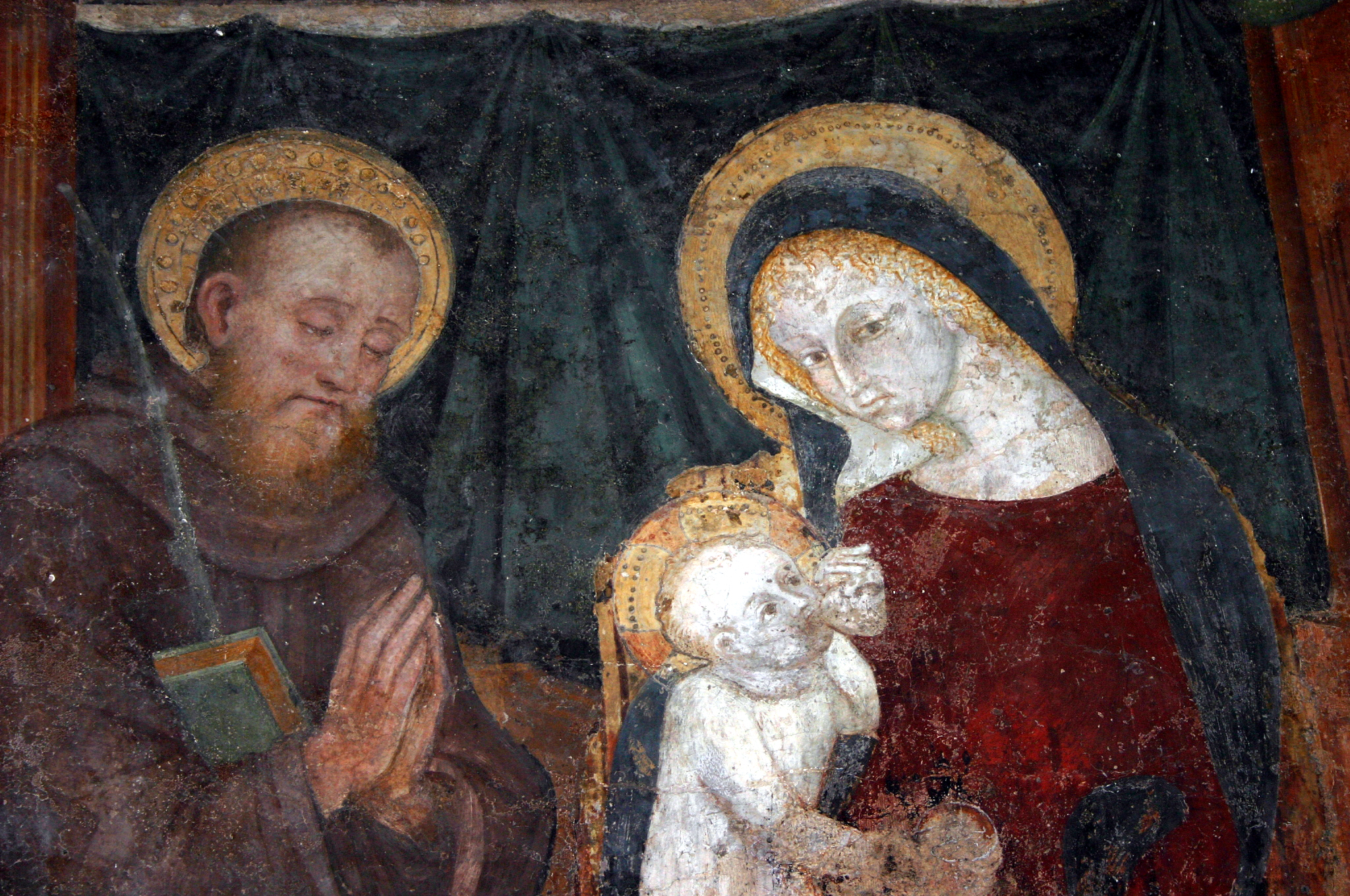
Saint Matronianus, with the Theotokos and Christ.

St. Viator, an early Bishop of Bergamo.

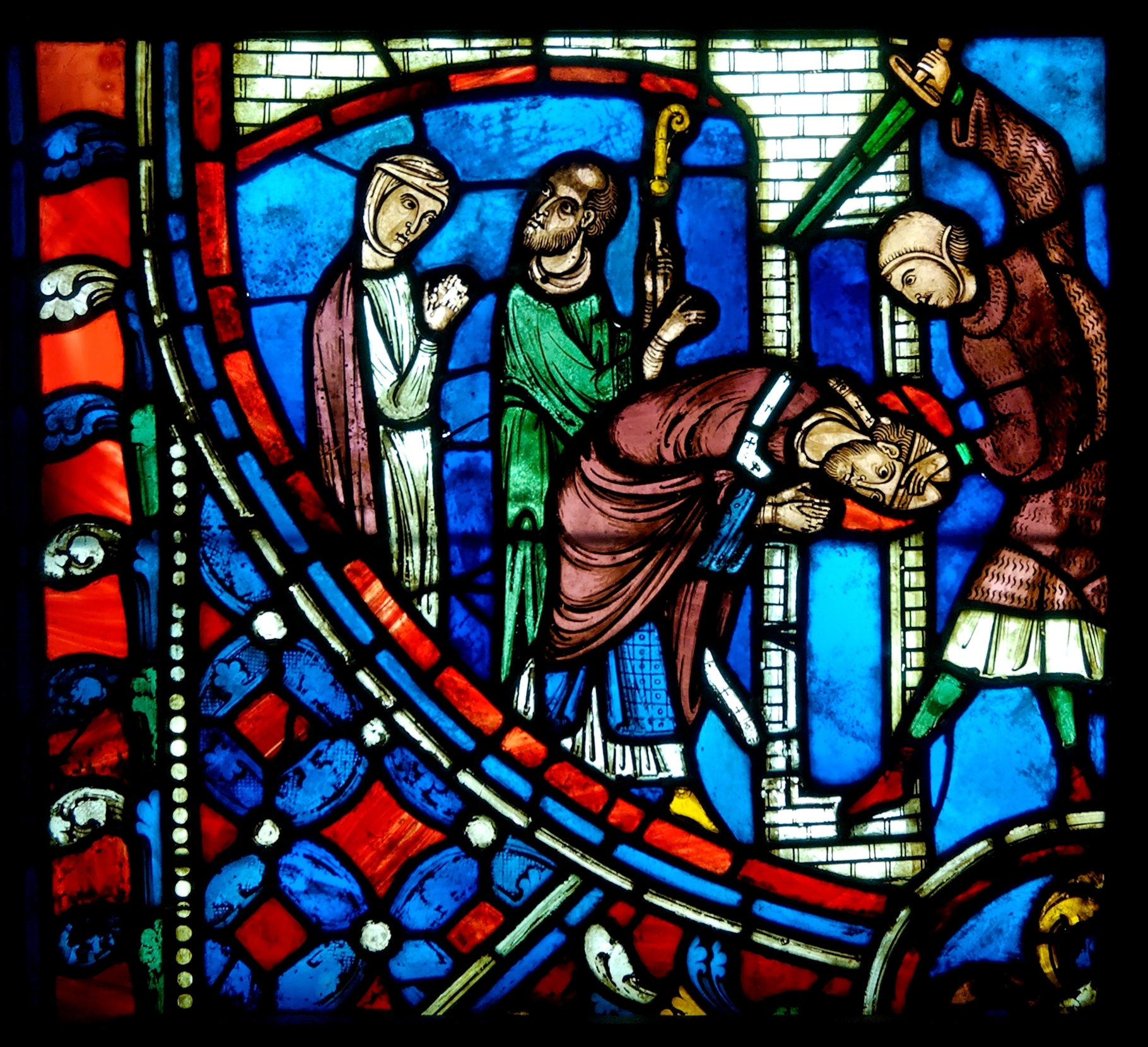
Martyrdom of St. Nicasius of Rheims.

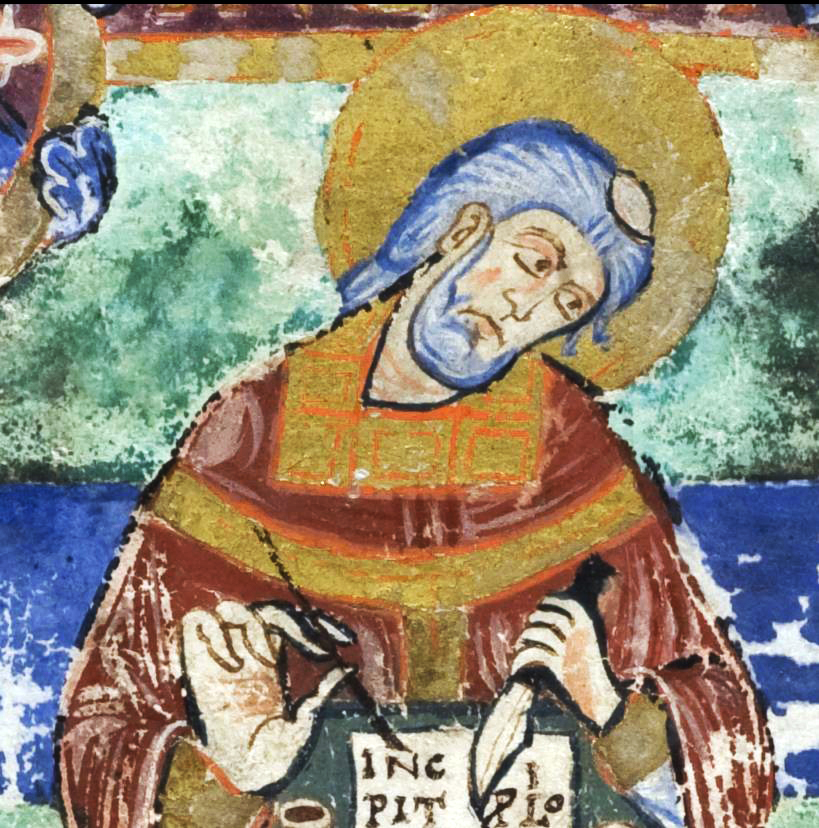
Miniature of St. Venantius Fortunatus.

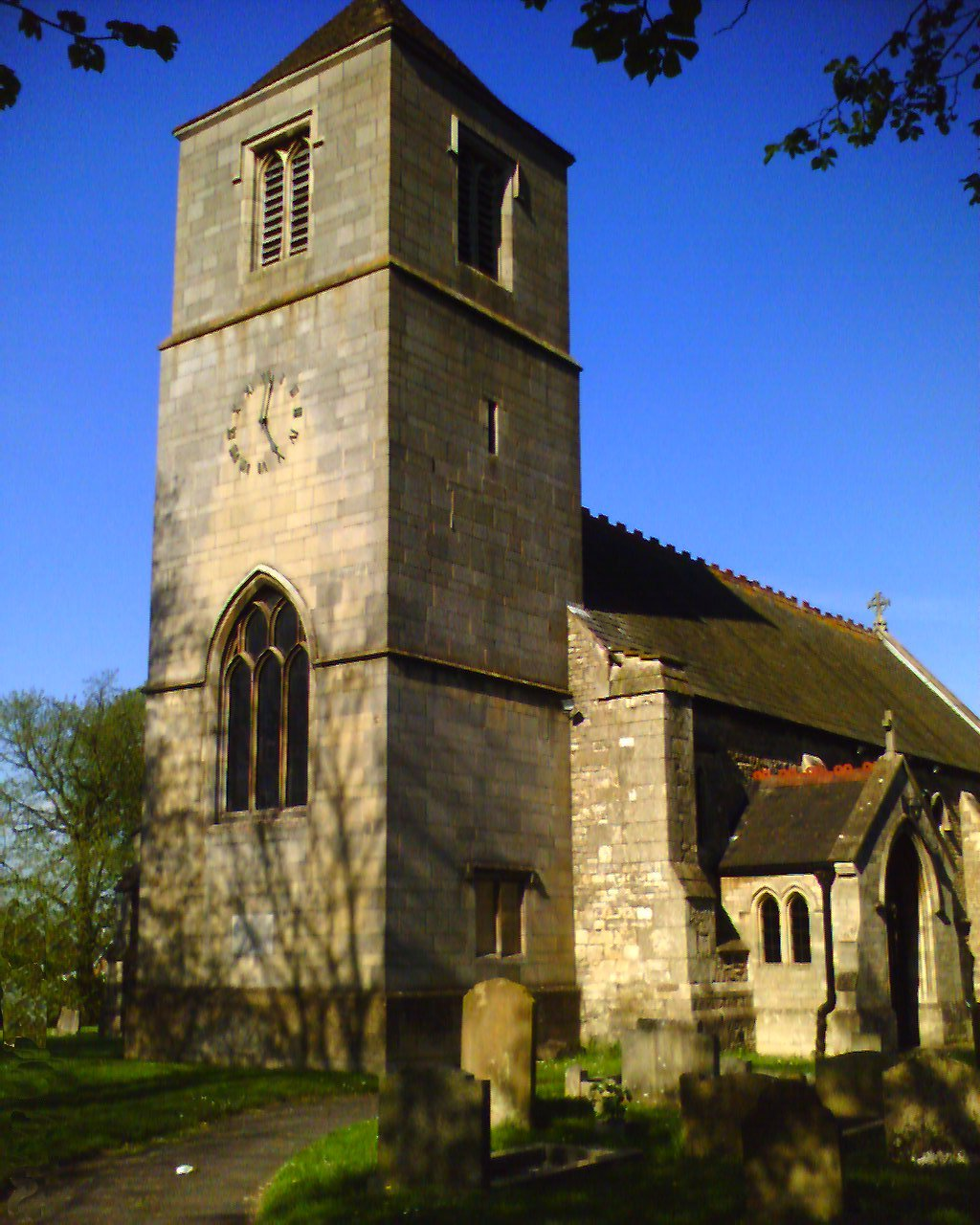
Tower of St. Hybald's Church in Hibaldstow.

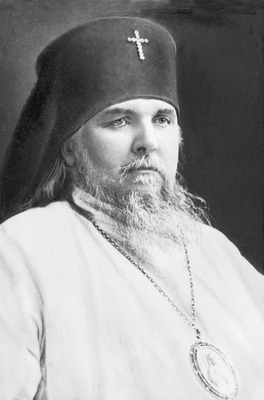
New Hiero-Confessor Bassian Pyatnitsky, Archbishop of Tambov.

== Sources ==
- December 14/27. Orthodox Calendar (PRAVOSLAVIE.RU).
- December 27 / December 14. HOLY TRINITY RUSSIAN ORTHODOX CHURCH (A parish of the Patriarchate of Moscow).
- December 14. OCA – The Lives of the Saints.
- The Autonomous Orthodox Metropolia of Western Europe and the Americas (ROCOR). St. Hilarion Calendar of Saints for the year of our Lord 2004. St. Hilarion Press (Austin, TX). p. 93.
- December 14. Latin Saints of the Orthodox Patriarchate of Rome.
- The Roman Martyrology. Transl. by the Archbishop of Baltimore. Last Edition, According to the Copy Printed at Rome in 1914. Revised Edition, with the Imprimatur of His Eminence Cardinal Gibbons. Baltimore: John Murphy Company, 1916.

Greek Sources

- Great Synaxaristes: (in Greek) 14 ΔΕΚΕΜΒΡΙΟΥ. ΜΕΓΑΣ ΣΥΝΑΞΑΡΙΣΤΗΣ.
- (in Greek) Συναξαριστής. 14 Δεκεμβρίου. ECCLESIA.GR. (H ΕΚΚΛΗΣΙΑ ΤΗΣ ΕΛΛΑΔΟΣ).

Russian Sources

- (in Russian) 27 декабря (14 декабря). Православная Энциклопедия под редакцией Патриарха Московского и всея Руси Кирилла (электронная версия). (Orthodox Encyclopedia – Pravenc.ru).
- (in Russian) 14 декабря (ст.ст.) 27 декабря 2010 (нов. ст.). Русская Православная Церковь Отдел внешних церковных связей. (DECR).
