= Sant'Agnello Maggiore =

Church of Sant'Agnello Maggiore
- Chiesa di Sant'Agnello Maggiore
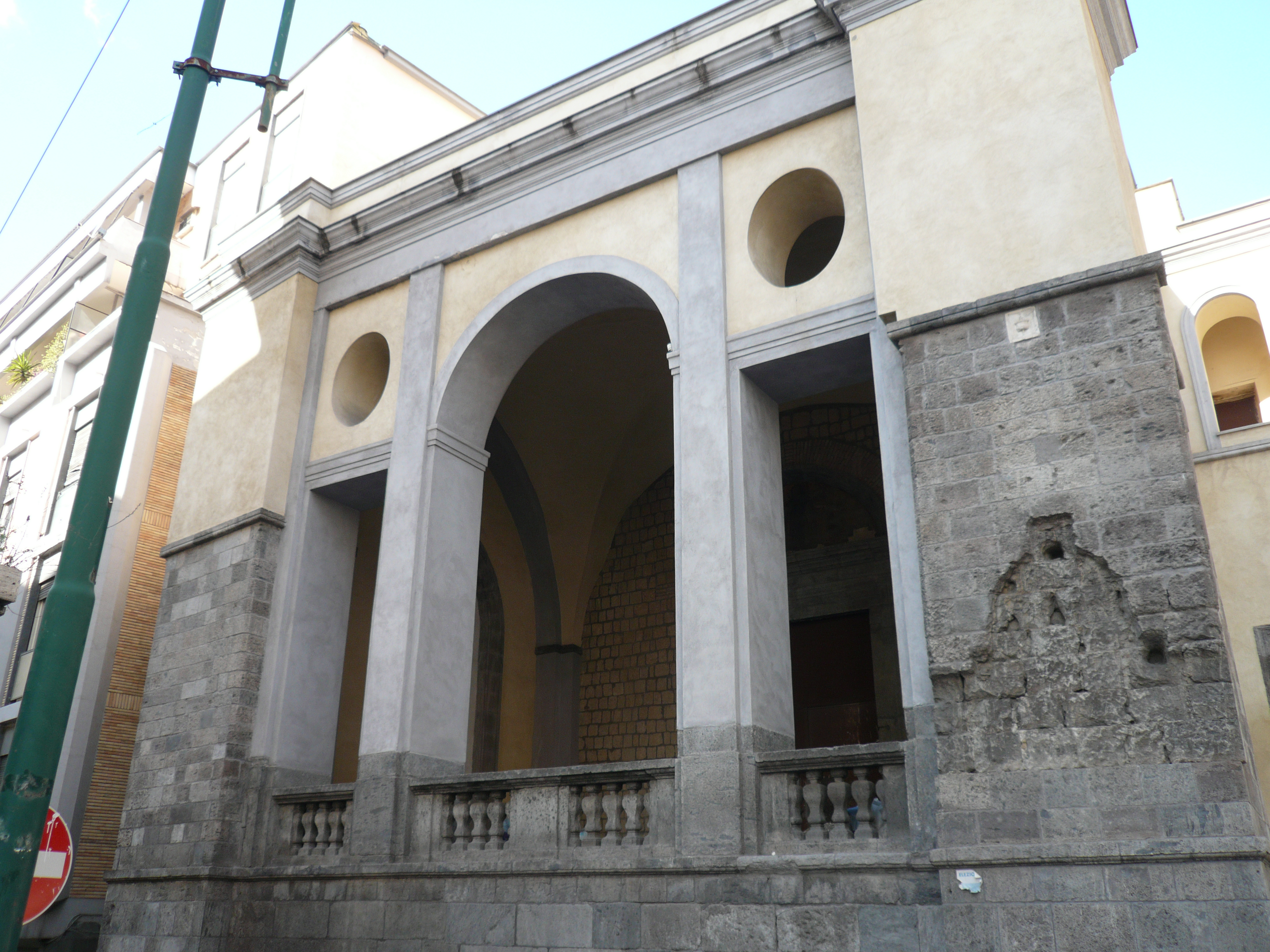
- Main entrance and façade.
- Church of Sant'Agnello Maggiore
- 40.853270°N 14.252560°E
- Location: Naples; Province of Naples, Campania
- Country: Italy
- Denomination: Roman Catholic

History
- Status: Active

Architecture
- Architectural type: Church

Administration
- Diocese: Roman Catholic Archdiocese of Naples

Sant'Agnello Maggiore, also called Sant'Aniello a Caponapoli or Santa Maria Intercede, is a church in the historical center of Naples, Italy.

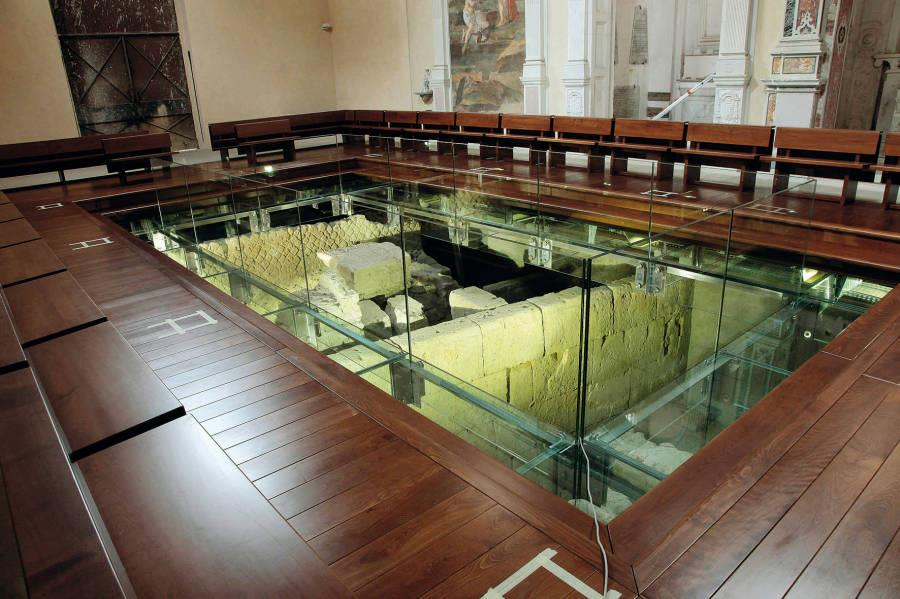
Interior of church and Greek walls

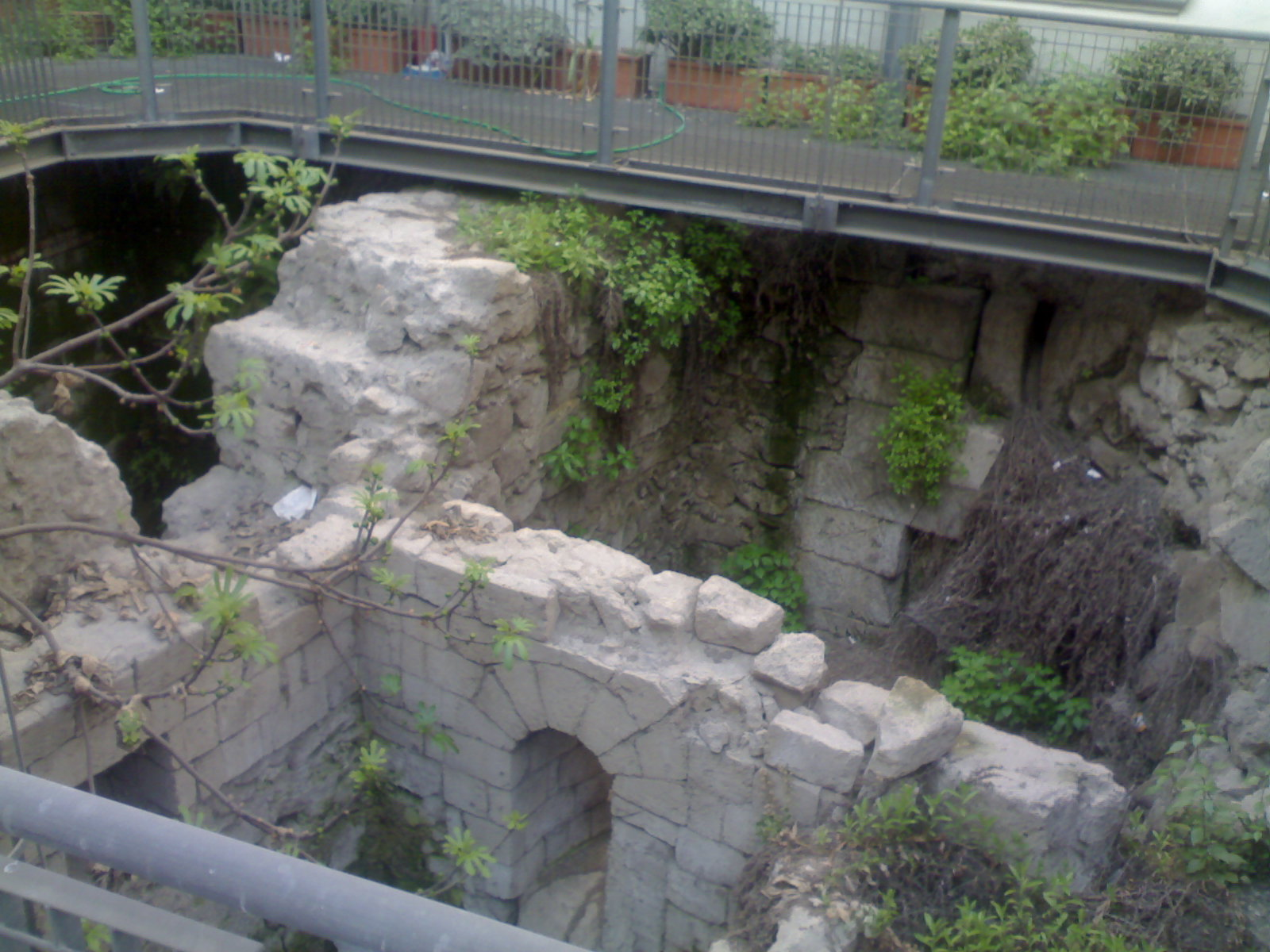
Ancient Greek walls of Neapolis in Largo Sant'Aniello

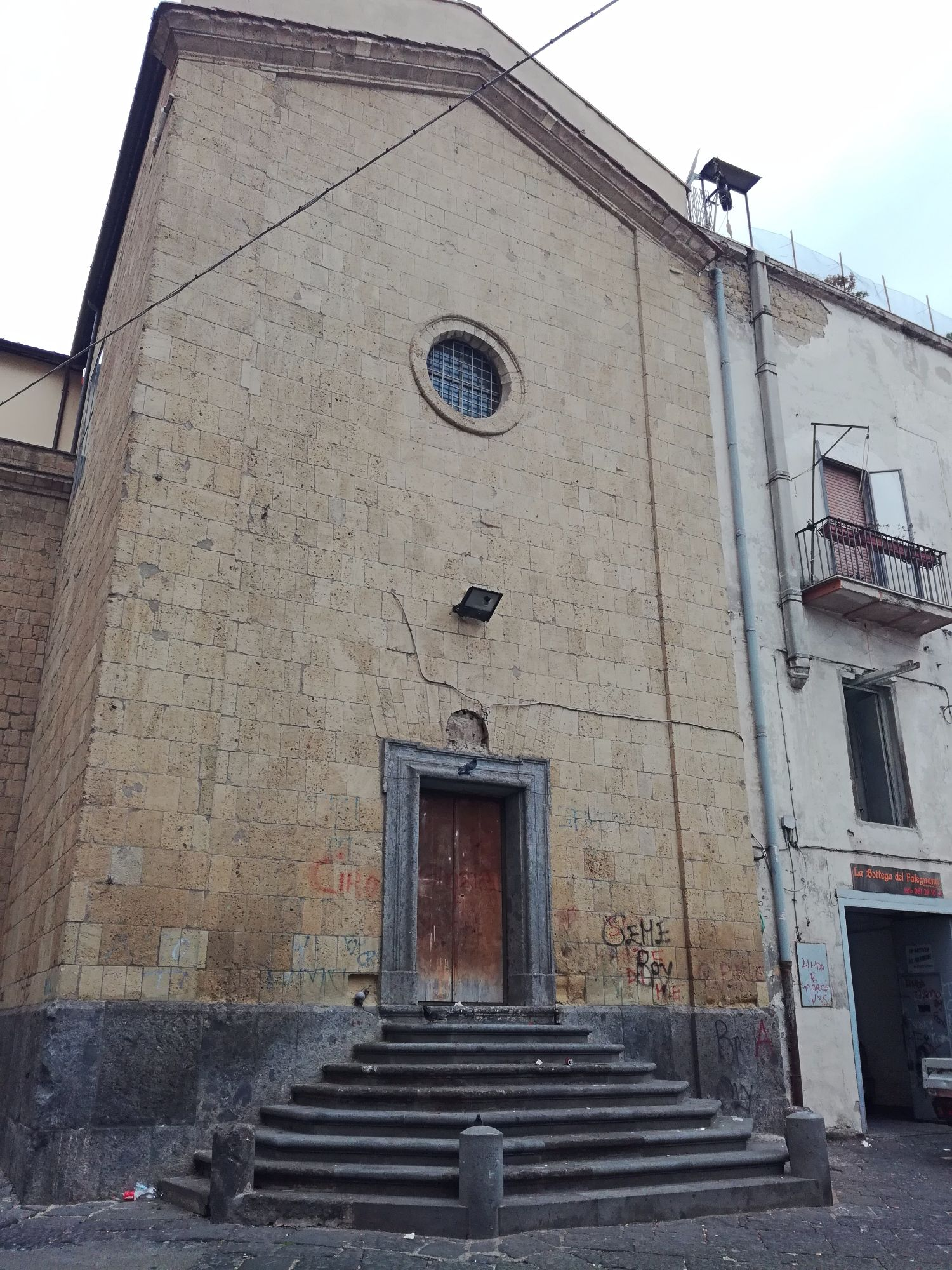
Entrance in the right transept.

According to tradition, Agnello of Naples, now co-patron (compatrono) of the city of Naples, is buried in this church. Other traditions hold he is buried in the Cathedral of Lucca.

The church was bombed in 1943 and left as a ruin until recent renovations have allowed its reopening to the public.

== History ==
Excavations starting in 1979 showed that the church was built above the ancient Greek (4th c. BC) double curtain city walls, now visible in the transept of the church, with interconnected braces and continuing outside in Largo Sant'Aniello. 3rd century BC reinforcements to the walls are in the nave.

The history of this church is linked to sant'Agnello. Agnello was a 6th-century Neapolitan bishop, who defended the city against the besieging Lombards. Supposedly the church had been founded and devoted to the Virgin, by Agnello's parents. When Sant'Agnello died, the church's name was changed to Santa Maria dei Sette Cieli (of the Seven Heavens). In the 9th century, Bishop Athanasius of Naples built a new religious building and dedicated to the abbot Saint Agnello and placed his relics in the church. During the Middle Ages, the cult of Sant'Agnello became increasingly important and the end of the 13th century till 1517, the church was under the direction of a rector, which from there on was a priest of the order of Canons Regular of the Lateran Congregation of the Most Holy Savior .

From 1510 to 1600, the church rebuilt and enlarged by the archbishop Giovanni Maria Poderico. The transept, previously the church of Santa Maria Intercede was reconstructed as part of this church in 1517 and work inside continued on till the 18th century. The main altar by Girolamo Santacroce, had additions by Giovanni Battista Pandullo. Vincenzo Martino redid the pavement.

On August 7, 1809, the monastic order in charge of the church was suppressed, and on January 12, 1809, the monastery was sold by the Minister of Finance to a private citizen Cosimo d'Orazio. However, by 1856, the Ministry of the Interior was in charge of the maintenance, and in 1903 had planned demolition of both the church and monastery, but the plan was never implemented. By 1913, the parish was transferred to the nearby church of Santa Maria di Costantinopoli due to the precarious state of the structure. The second world war added damage. In 1962, during reconstruction the remains of the ancient acropolis were found. Vandalism, earthquakes, and decay have contributed to its poor state of conservation. In 2011, after a long restoration, the church has reopened.

The church still retains medieval traces in bas reliefs. The paintings moved here are of uncertain attribution. Only the main altar sculpted by Girolamo Santacroce is original.

== Bibliography ==
- Luigi Catalani, La chiese di Napoli, Tipografia Fu Migliaccio, 1845, pages 167-172.
- Vincenzo Regina, Le chiese di Napoli. Viaggio indimenticabile attraverso la storia artistica, architettonica, letteraria, civile e spirituale della Napoli sacra, Newton e Compton editor, Naples 2004.
- AA.VV., Segno metodo progetto. Itinerari of the image urbana tra memoria e intervento, Elio de Rosa editore, Naples, Italy 1990.
