= Pietro Negroni =

Italian painter

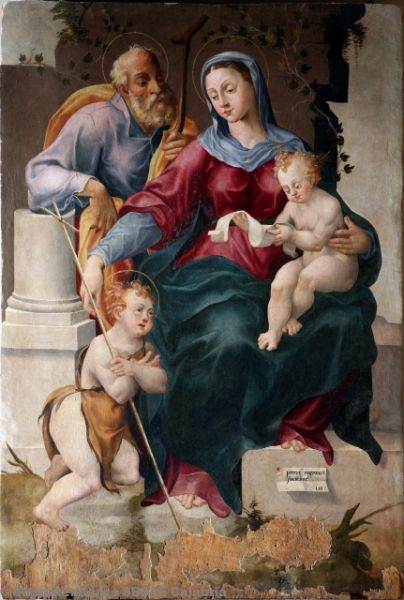
- Holy Family with St. John, 1557
- Born: c. 1505, Cosenza, Italy
- Died: 1565
- Occupation: painter

Pietro Negroni, also called Il Giovane Zingaro (the young gypsy) and Lo zingarello di Cosenza (the little gypsy from Cosenza) (c. 1505 – 1565), was an Italian painter of the Renaissance period, active mainly in Naples. He was known for his altarpieces, mythological scenes and portraits.

== Life ==
Negroni was a pupil of the painters Giovanni Antonio D’Amato and Marco Cardisco, and strongly influenced by Polidoro da Caravaggio. He painted an Adoration of Magi (1541) and Scourging of Christ for the church of Santa Maria Donna Regina Vecchia in Naples. He painted a Virgin with child and angels and saints for Sant'Agnello. He painted a Virgin and Child for Santa Croce in Lucca. He painted milk in Aversa and Cosenza, and an altarpiece in the church of the Congrega of Mongrassano in Calabria. He painted a portrait of a young man now at the Galleria Borghese in Rome.
