= Agnellus of Naples =

Italian Catholic saint

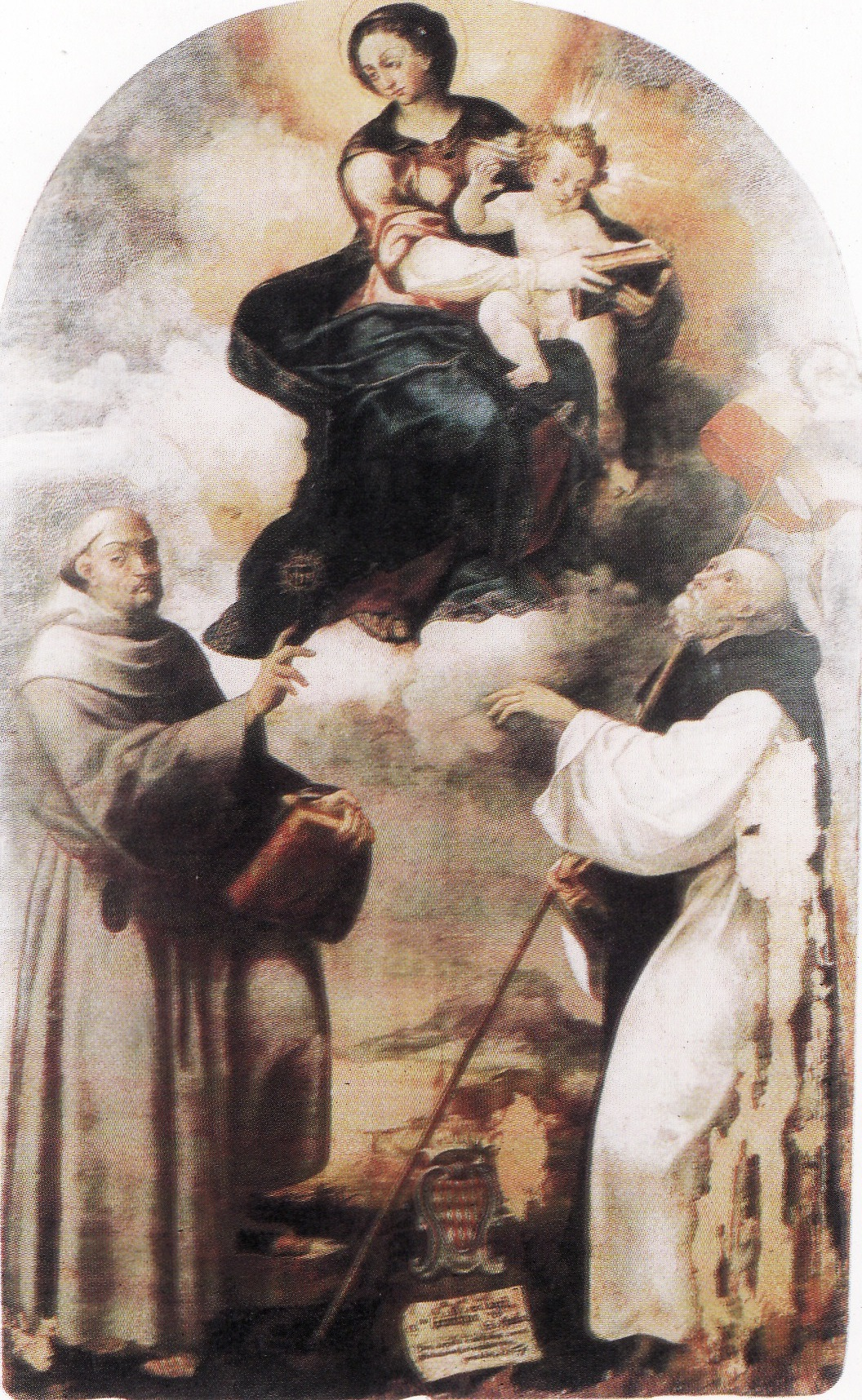
- Pietro Negroni, Madonna and Child with Saints Bernardino and Aniello (Pinacoteca del convento di Sant'Antonio in Nocera Inferiore)
- Born: 535; Naples
- Hometown: Naples
- Died: 14 December 596; Naples
- Venerated in: Catholic Church
- Major shrine: Eremo di Sant'Agnello, Guarcino
- Attributes: Banner of the Cross, crosier
- Patronage: Sant'Agnello (NA), Roccarainola (NA), city of Naples (co-patron); Guarcino (FR) (co-patron); Rodio (SA) (co-patron); Pisciotta (SA) (co-patron)

Agnellus of Naples (Italian: Agnello) or Aniello the Abbot (535, Naples - 14 December 596, Naples) was a Basilian monk and later Augustinian friar. He is venerated as a saint by the Catholic Church, with a feast day on 14 December, the date of his death.

== Life ==
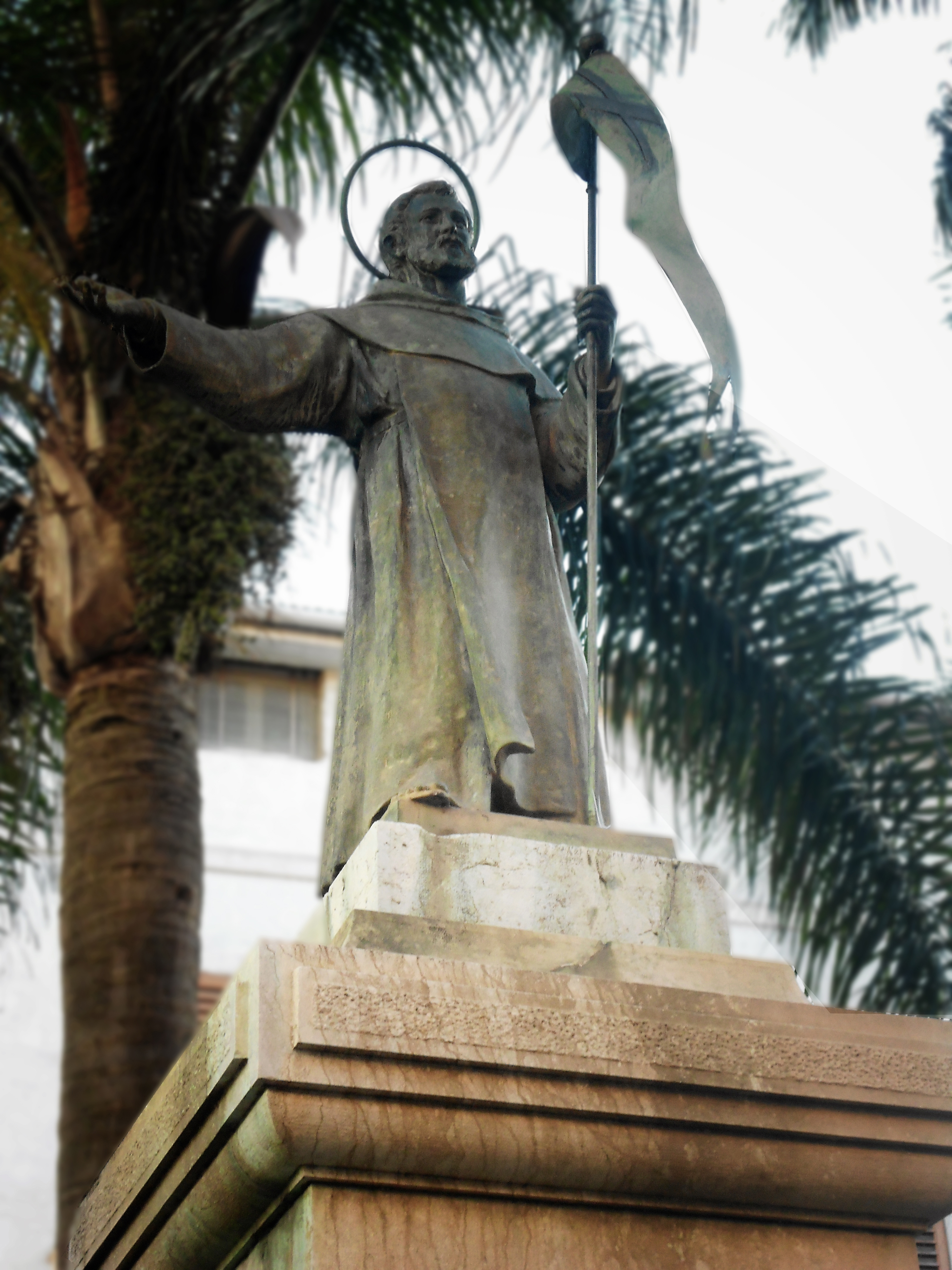
Statue of the saint in the town named after him.

The first major mention of Agnellus is in the Libellus miraculorum, a 10th-century hagiography by Peter the Sub-Deacon. He was born in 535 in Naples into a rich family of Syracusan origin, possibly related to saint Lucy - his father was Federico and his mother Giovanna. He spent his youth as a hermit in a cave near a chapel dedicated to the Virgin Mary and then in the church of Santa Maria Intercede, which later became Sant'Agnello Maggiore. He received a wealthy inheritance on his parents' death and used it on works of charity, such as founding a hospital for poor people.

He became more and more popular among the inhabitants of Naples, so much so that they asked him to save the city during the Lombard invasion of 581 - he appeared carrying a banner of the cross to defend the city. He finally left the city to escape his popularity, moving to Monte Sant'Angelo then the village of Guarcino, where he remained seven years and where there is a shrine to him. He later returned to Naples to become an Augustinian friar and then a priest at the monastery of Gaudiosus of Naples, where he finally became abbot and where he died aged 61.

== Bibliography (in Italian) ==
- Alfredo Cattabiani, Santi d'Italia, Milano, Rizzoli, 1993, ISBN 88-17-84233-8
- Piero Bargellini, Mille Santi del giorno, Vallecchi editore, 1977
- Bonaventura Gargiulo, Il glorioso S. Agnello, abate: studio storico critico, con appendici, Stab. tip. librario A. e S. Festa, 1903
- Anselmo Lettieri, S. Agnello Abate, il suo corpo e il suo culto in Lucca, La Tipografica di O. & E. Malanima, Lucca, 1948
- Andrea Manzo, Relazione Storica della parrocchia di Gargani e brevissima vita del Gran Patrono S. Agnello Abbate, Tipografia "Dante Alighieri, 1911
