= Saint Thyrsus =

Saint, martyr

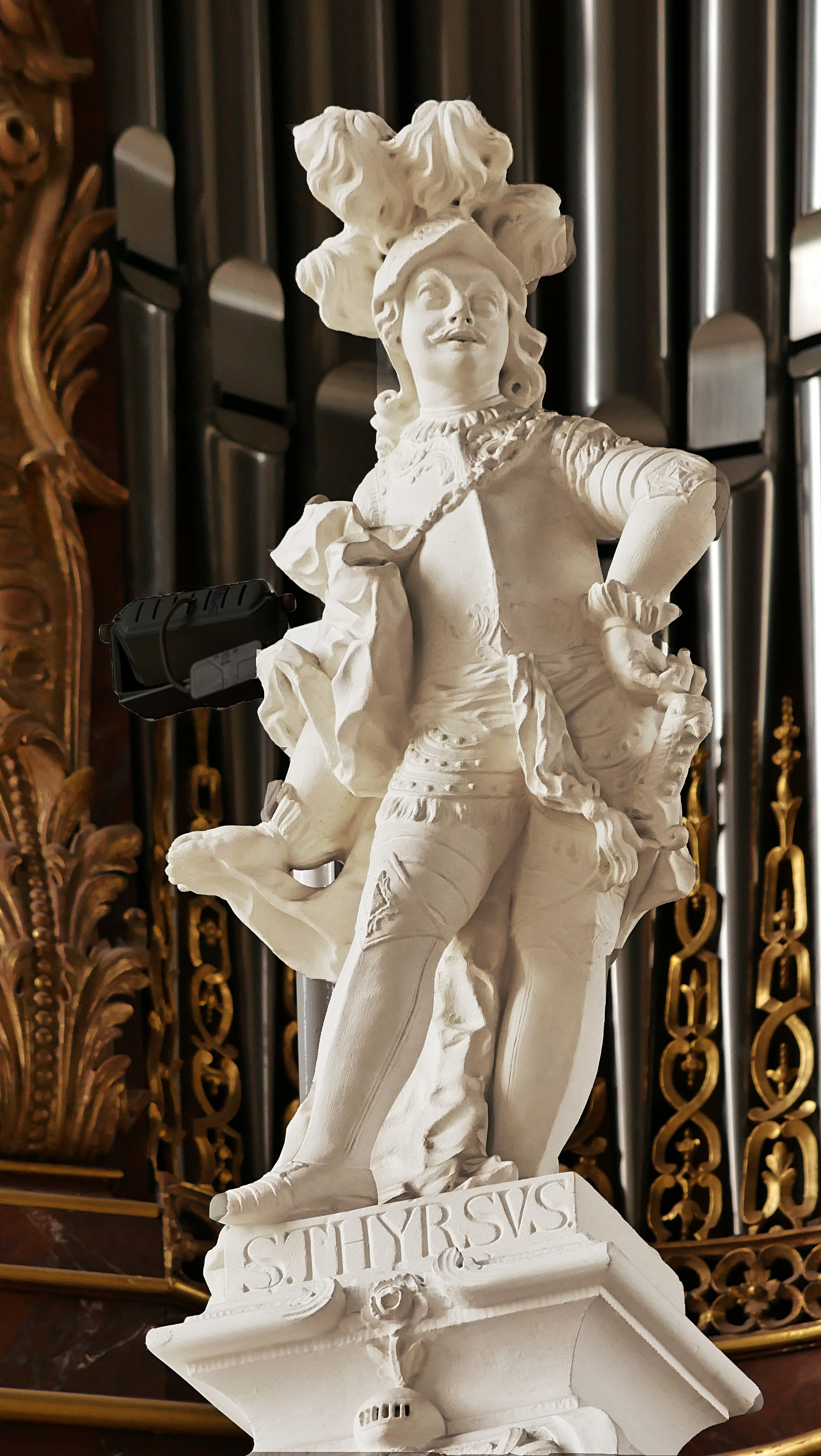
- Statue of Saint Tirso Basilica of St. Paulinus, Trier

Martyr
- Born: 3rd century Smyrna, Asia (modern-day İzmir, Turkey)
- Died: 251 AD; Apollonia, Phrygia
- Venerated in: Eastern Orthodox Church; Roman Catholic Church
- Feast: Dec 14, Aug 17 (Orthodoxy); January 28 (Catholicism)
- Attributes: bucksaw
- Patronage: Sisteron

Saint Thyrsus /ˈθɜːrsəs/ or Thyrse /ˈθɜːrs/ (Ancient Greek: Θύρσος, romanized: Thúrsos, literally "thyrsus"; Spanish and Portuguese: Tirso; French: Thyrse; died 251) is venerated as a Christian martyr. He was killed for his faith in Apollonia, Phrygia, during the persecution of Decius, along with Leucius /ˈl(j)uːʃəs/ (Λεύκιος Leúkios) and Callinicus /ˌkælɪˈnaɪkəs/ (Καλλίνικος Kallínīkos). Tradition states that Thyrsus endured many tortures and was sentenced to be sawn in half. However, the saw did not penetrate as it became so heavy that the executioners could not use it. Saint Leucius, after reproaching the governor, Cumbricius, was hanged, harrowed on his sides, and then beheaded. Callinicus, a pagan priest, was converted after seeing the martyrdom of Thyrsus and was also beheaded.

== Veneration ==
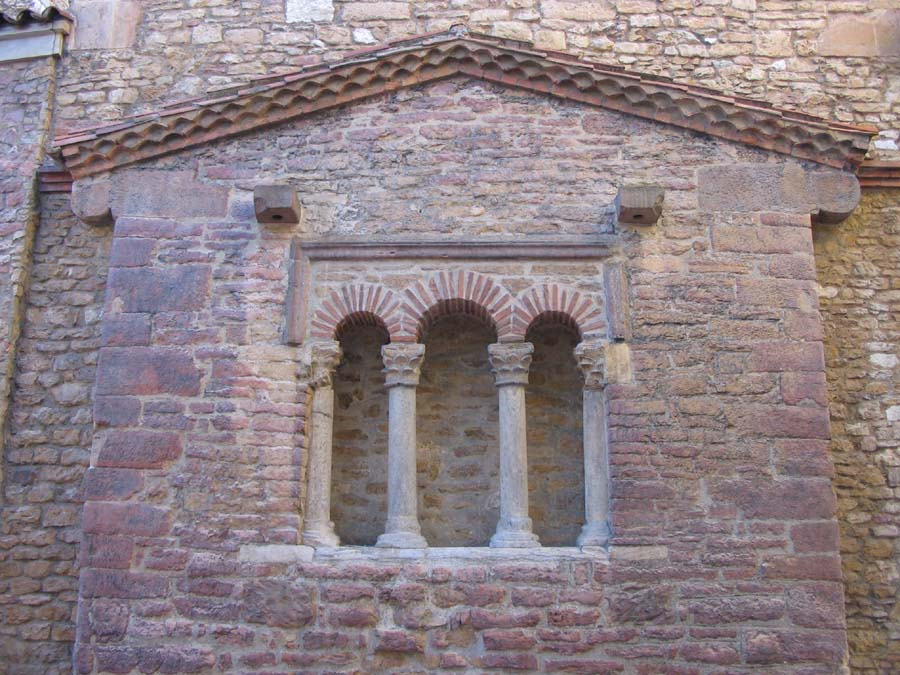
Church of San Tirso in Oviedo.

Thyrsus' relics were brought to Constantinople. His cult became popular in the Iberian Peninsula since the Middle Ages, initially known as Santo Tirso, remaining as that only in Portugal, as it changed to San Tirso in Spain. Thyrsus had a full office in the Mozarabic liturgy. Some of his relics were brought to France: Thyrsus is thus the titular saint of the cathedral of Sisteron in the Basses Alpes, the Cathédrale Notre Dame et Saint Thyrse. Thyrsus is thus the patron saint of Sisteron. A 12th-century church was also dedicated to him at Châteauponsac.
