= Nicarete =

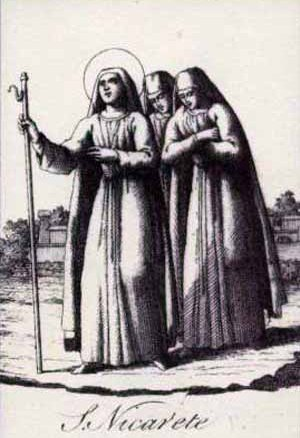

Saint Nicarete (5th century), was a woman of Nicomedia who became a saint as a disciple of St. John Chrysostom. She left her home specifically to study theology and practice devotion and care for the poor in Constantinople. She became a follower of John Chrysostom and worked as a physician as well as a healer for the poor. She cured John Chrysostom of a stomach ailment. Later, when Chrysostom was sent into exile from Constantinople, she went with him.

Her feast day in the west is December 27.
