= Matronian =

Saint Matronian
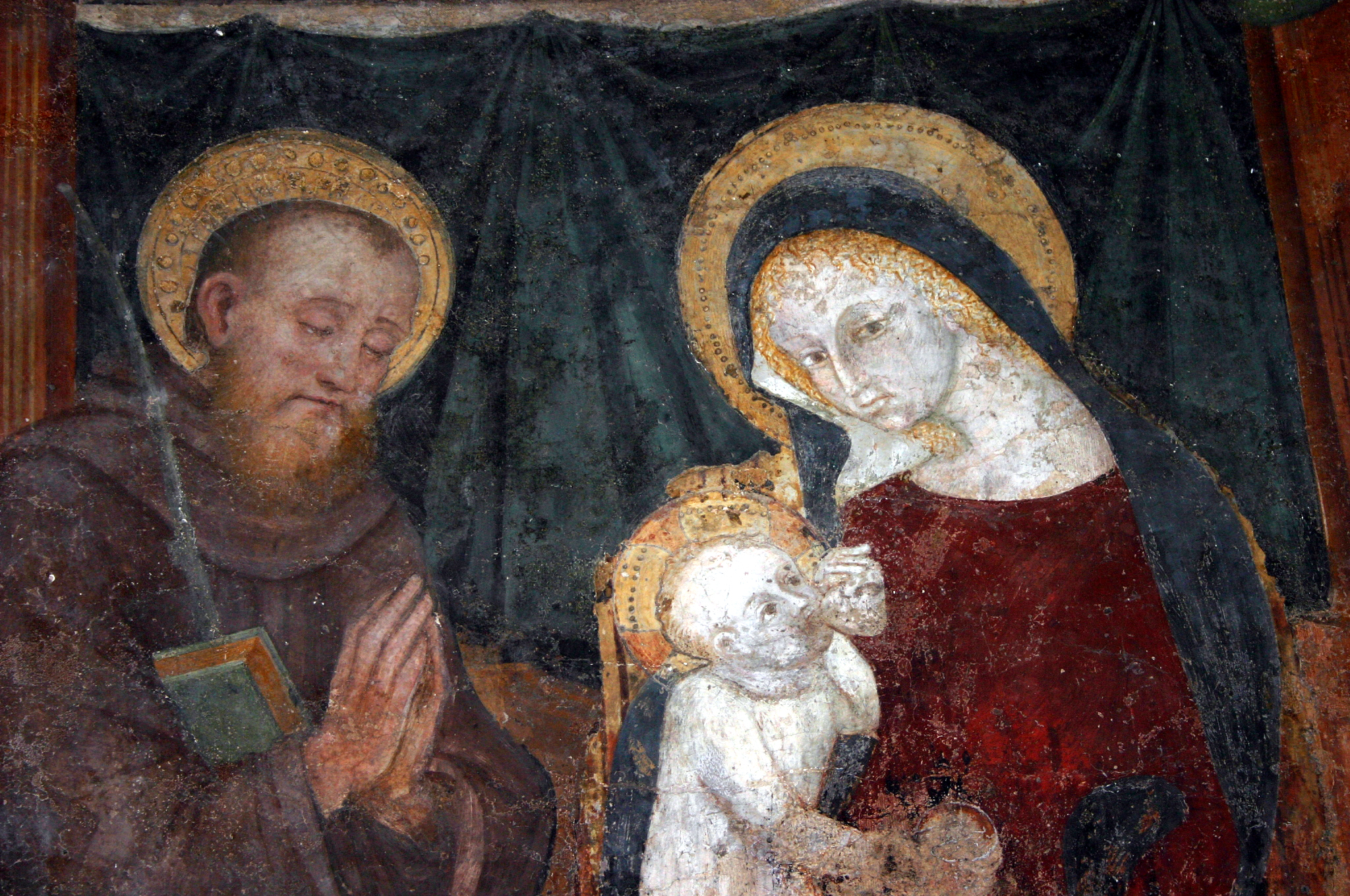
- Madonna and Child and Saint Matronianus (detail). 15th century (the Madonna) and 16th century (Saint Matronianus) fresco in the nave of San Nazaro Maggiore in Milan.
- Venerated in: Roman Catholic Church
- Feast: December 14

Matronian(us) (Italian: San Matroniano) was a hermit of Milan. It is recorded that Ambrose enshrined Matronian's relics in the church of San Nazaro Maggiore in Milan.
