= December 27 (Eastern Orthodox liturgics) =

Day in the Eastern Orthodox liturgical calendar

Eastern Orthodox liturgical calendar
December 26	December 27	December 28
December 27 O.S. ≍ January 9 N.S. December 27 N.S ≍ December 14 O.S.

An Eastern Orthodox cross

December 27 in Eastern Orthodox liturgical calendars is a feast day and a day of commemoration of saints and martyrs. Although some Orthodox churches use the Revised Julian Calendar and others use the traditional Julian calendar, the fixed commemorations for their respective December 27 are broadly the same, no matter which calendar is used. (Note: Despite the dates being the same, the days to which they refer typically differ by 13 days. The notation Old Style or O.S. is sometimes used to indicate a date in the traditional Julian Calendar (the "Old Calendar"). The notation New Style or N.S. indicates a date in the Revised Julian calendar (the "New Calendar").)

== Feasts ==
- Third Day of the Feast of the Nativity. (Note: The third day of the Nativity is dedicated to the Protomartyr St. Stephen. This is the third day of the three-day Winter Pascha.)

== Saints ==
- Apostle and Archdeacon Stephen the Protomartyr (34)
- Saint Maximus, Pope of Alexandria (282) (Note: He participated in the Synod of Antioch against the teachings of Paul of Samosata.) (Note: "At Alexandria, St. Maximus, bishop, who became a renowned and distinguished confessor of the faith.")
- Martyrs Maurice, with his son Photinus, and 70 soldiers, at Apamea (286–305) (Note: The Greek text states that this Apamea was in Bithynia, of Pontus - ((in Greek): Ἀπάμεια τῆς Βιθυνίας τοῦ Πόντου).) (see also: February 22)
- Saint Theodore I, Patriarch of Constantinople (686)
- Venerable Theodore Graptus (the Branded) of Palestine and Bithynia, Confessor, brother of Saint Theophanes the Confessor (840) (Note: Brother of St. Theophanes the Confessor and Hymnographer.) (Note: "At Constantinople, the holy confessors Theodore and Theophanes, brothers, who were brought up from their childhood in the Monastery of St. Sabbas. Afterwards, combating bravely for the worship of holy images against Leo the Armenian, they were scourged by his command and banished. After his death, they again firmly opposed the emperor Theophilus, who was imbued with the same impiety, and were scourged a second time and driven into exile, where Theodore expired in prison. Theophanes, after peace had at length been restored to the Church, was made bishop of Nicea and rested in the Lord.")
- Venerable Luke, Abbot of the Monastery of the Deep Stream in Triglia in Bithynia. (Note: He was likely Abbot of the Monastery of the Deep Stream in Triglia, in Bithynia. He reposed peacefully.)

== Pre-Schism Western saints ==
- Saint Fabiola, a patrician in Rome who gave up all earthly pleasures and devoted herself to the practice of Christian asceticism and charitable work (399) (Note: A patrician in Rome who married and divorced. She married again, causing scandal. After the death of her second husband, she repented and devoted her wealth to the care of the sick in a hospital which she established. She also founded a hostel for pilgrims in Rome and was greatly venerated.)

== Post-Schism Orthodox saints ==
- Saint Barlaam (Petrov), Metropolitan of Tobolsk and All Siberia (1802) (Note: See: (in Russian) Варлаам (Петров). Википедии. (Russian Wikipedia).)
- Venerable Abbot Boniface Vinogradsky, founder of St. Panteleimon Monastery, Kiev (ru) (1871) (Note: "On February 20, 2011, on the Sunday of the Prodigal Son, His Beatitude Metropolitan Vladimir of Kiev and All Ukraine presided over the solemn canonization of Abbot Boniface (Vinogradsky) (+ December 27, 1871), the founder of the St. Panteleimon Monastery in Feofania (Kiev) and ascetic of piety, reports Patriarchia.ru. Abbot Boniface is now a locally canonized saint of the Ukrainian Orthodox Church.") (Note: See: (in Russian) Вонифатий (Виноградский). Википедии. (Russian Wikipedia).)

=== New martyrs and confessors ===
- New Hieromartyrs Tikhon Nikanorov, Archbishop of Voronezh, and with him 160 martyred priests (1919) (Note: See: (in Russian) Тихон (Никаноров). Википедии. (Russian Wikipedia).)
- New Virgin Martyr Antonina (Bryanskikh) (1937)

== Other commemorations ==
- Uncovering of the relics of Venerable Therapont (Pherapont) of Belozersk and Mozhaisk, Luzhetsk (1514) (see also: May 27 - feast day)
- Repose of Right-Believing Sviatoslav II Yaroslavich, Grand Prince of Kiev, son of Saint Yaroslav the Wise (1076) (see also: May 21 - feast day)
- Repose of Nicholas Ilminsky, Missionary to the Tatars (1891)
- Repose of Archimandrite Agathangelus of Svir and Valaam (1909)
- Repose of Helen Ivanovna Motovilova (1910)
- Repose of Abbot Athanasius of Gregoriou Monastery, Mount Athos (1953)
- Repose of Archimandrite Seraphim Rozenberg of the Pskov-Caves Monastery (1993)

=== Icons ===
- All-Merciful Kykko Icon of the Mother of God.

== Icon gallery ==
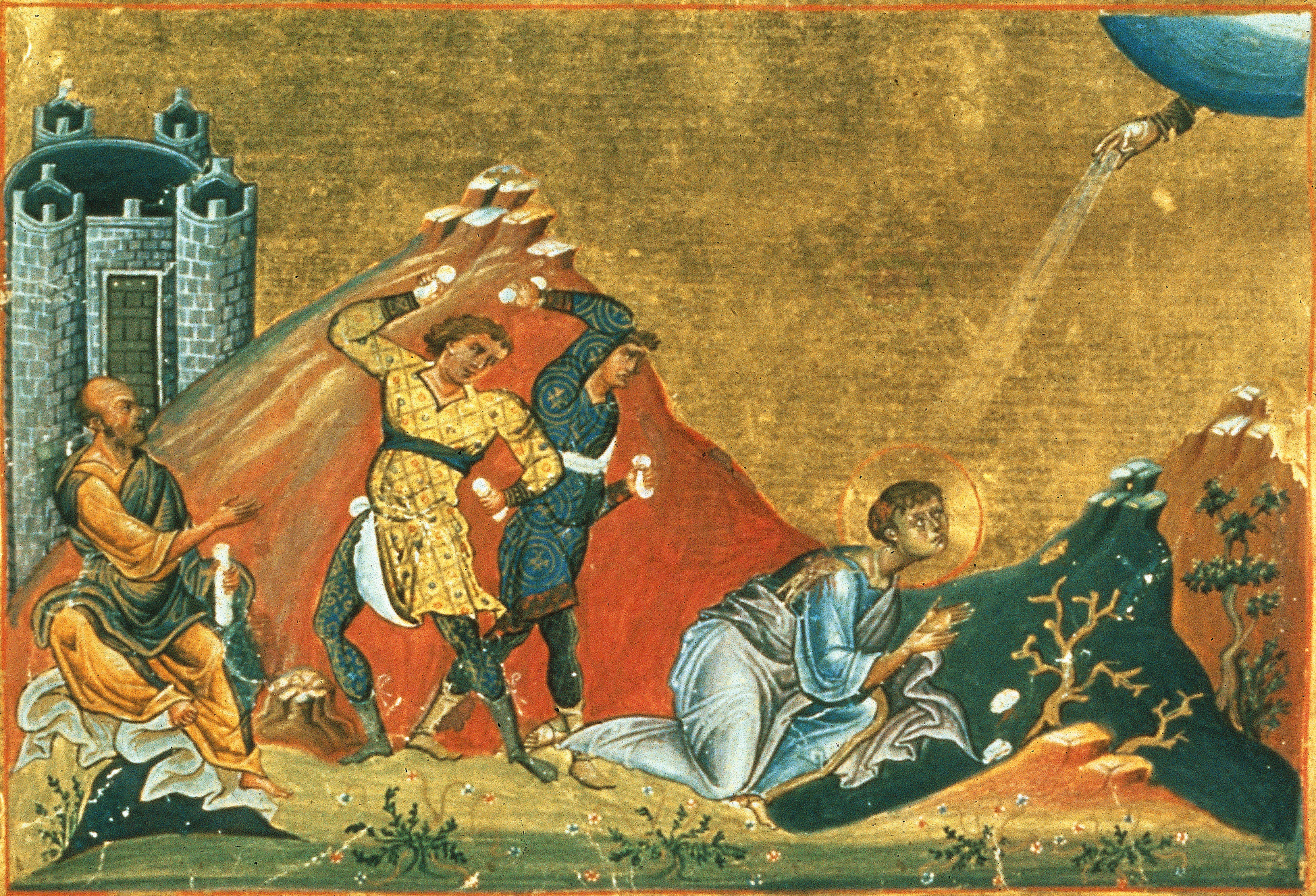
Martyrdom of Archdeacon Stephen
(Menologion of Basil II, 10th century).

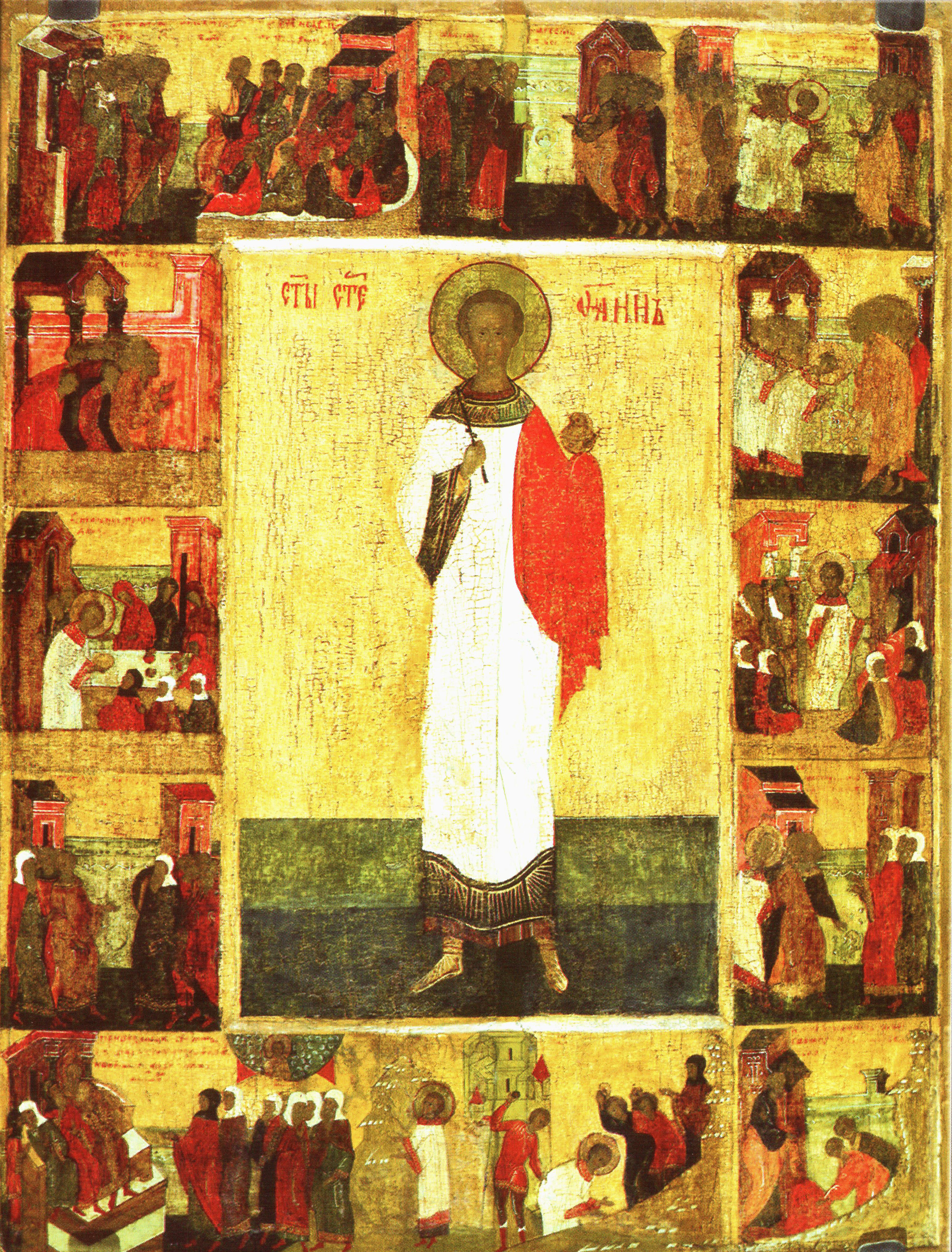
Russian icon of Protomartyr Archdeacon Stephen
(16th century).

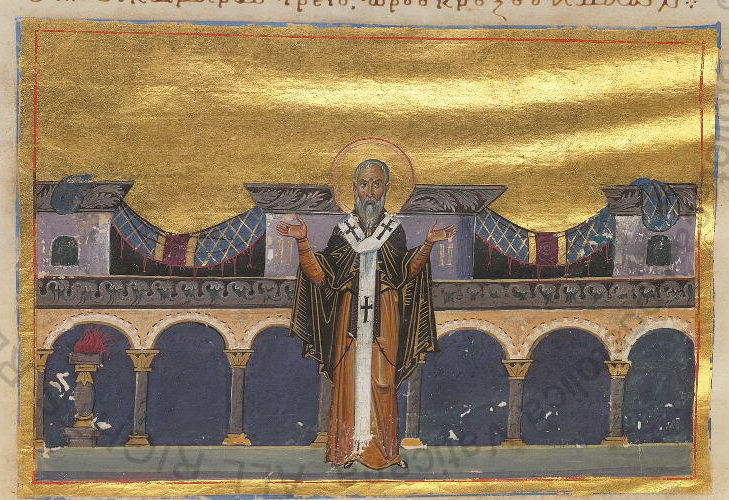
St. Theodore I, Patriarch of Constantinople.
(Menologion of Basil II, 10th century).

St. Theodore Graptus (the Branded), of Palestine and Bithynia, Confessor.
(Menologion of Basil II, 10th century).

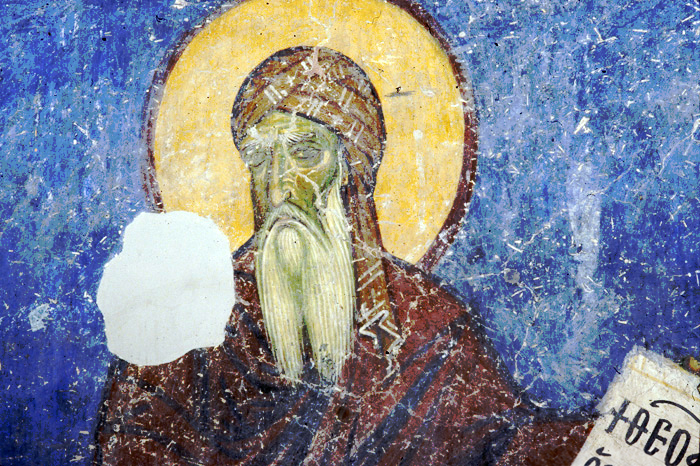
St. Theodore Graptus (the Branded), of Palestine and Bithynia, Confessor.

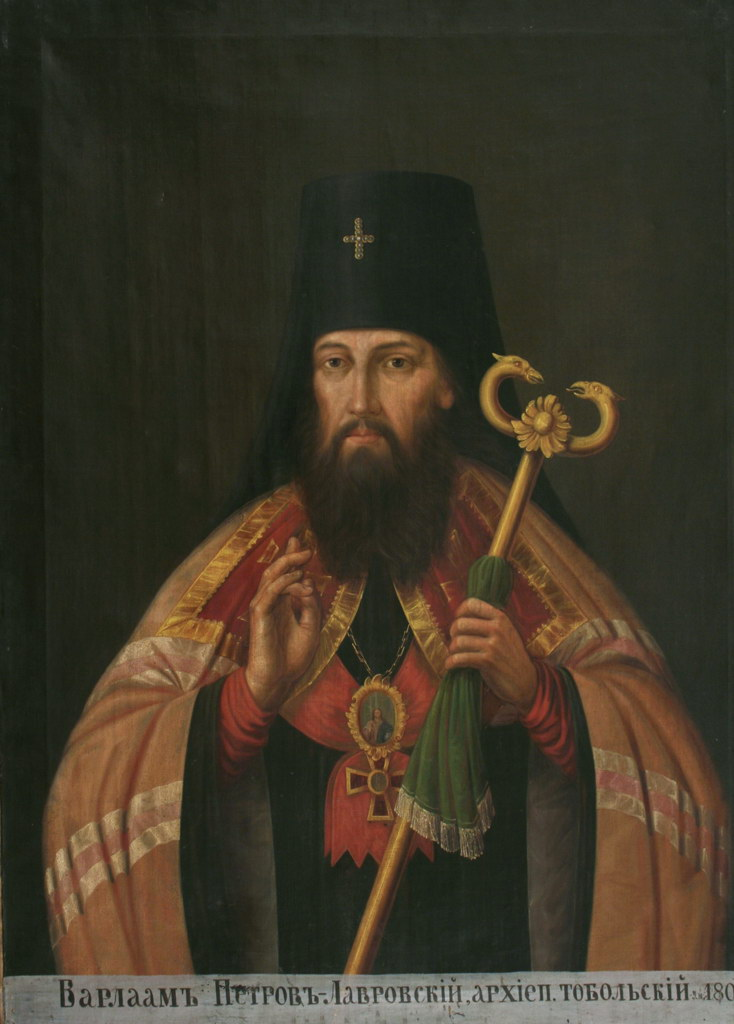
St. Barlaam (Petrov), Metropolitan of Tobolsk and All Siberia.

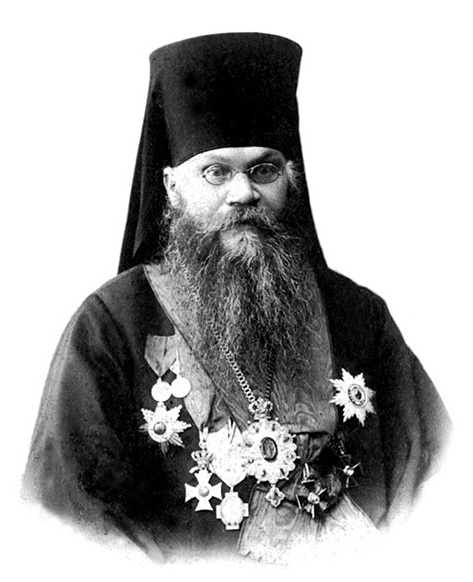
New Hieromartyr Tikhon Nikanorov, Archbishop of Voronezh.

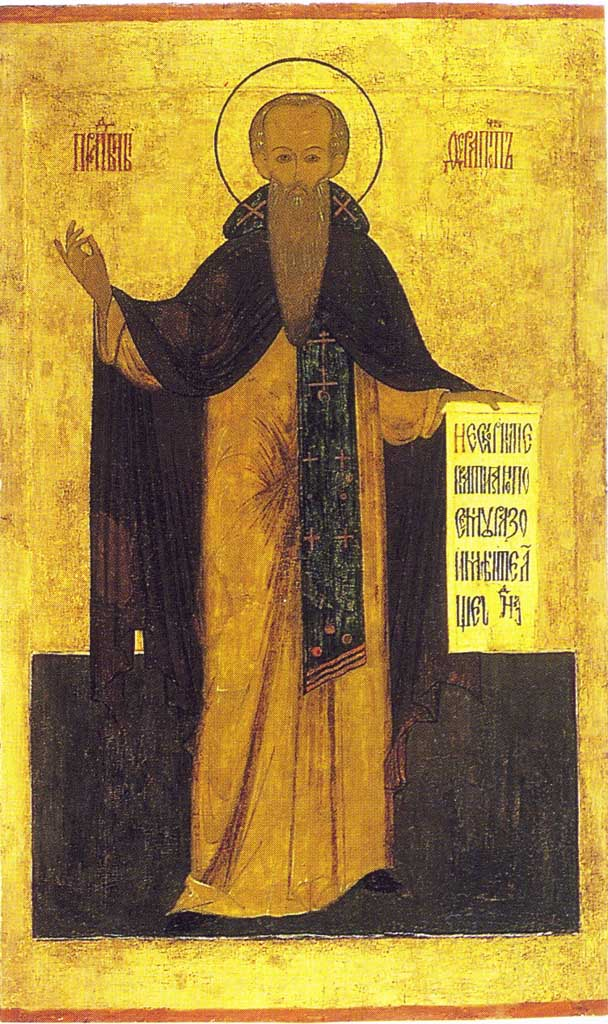
St. Therapont of White Lake.

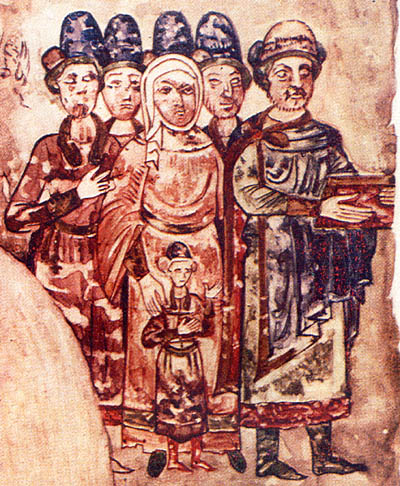
Saint Sviatoslav II of Kiev (far right), with his family.

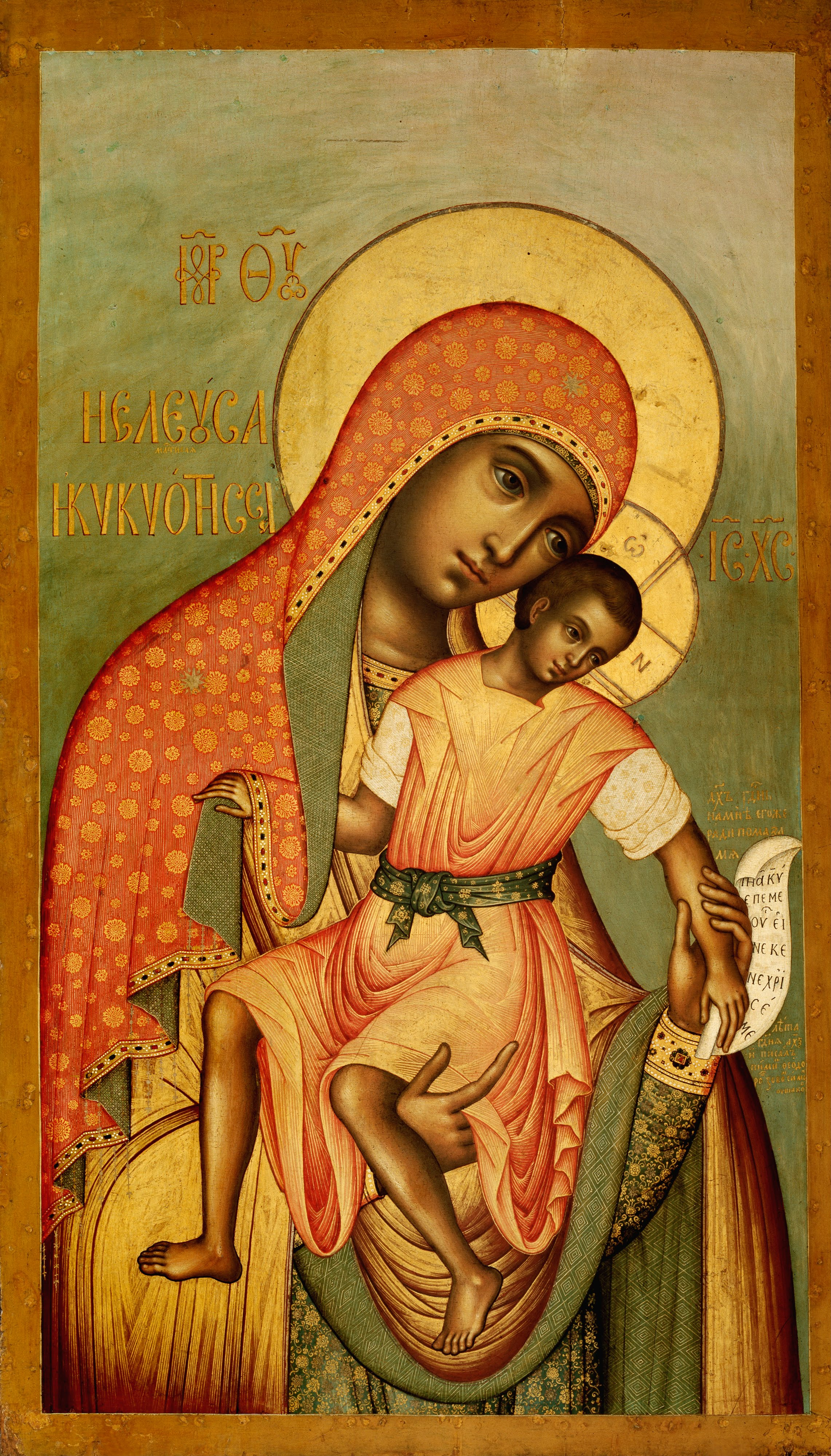
Virgin Eleousa of Kykkos
(Simon Ushakov, 1626–1686).

== Sources ==
- December 27/January 9. Orthodox Calendar (PRAVOSLAVIE.RU).
- January 9 / December 27. HOLY TRINITY RUSSIAN ORTHODOX CHURCH (A parish of the Patriarchate of Moscow).
- December 27. OCA - The Lives of the Saints.
- The Autonomous Orthodox Metropolia of Western Europe and the Americas (ROCOR). St. Hilarion Calendar of Saints for the year of our Lord 2004. St. Hilarion Press (Austin, TX). p. 3.
- December 27. Latin Saints of the Orthodox Patriarchate of Rome.
- The Roman Martyrology. Transl. by the Archbishop of Baltimore. Last Edition, According to the Copy Printed at Rome in 1914. Revised Edition, with the Imprimatur of His Eminence Cardinal Gibbons. Baltimore: John Murphy Company, 1916. pp. 398–399.

Greek Sources

- Great Synaxaristes: (in Greek) 27 ΔΕΚΕΜΒΡΙΟΥ. ΜΕΓΑΣ ΣΥΝΑΞΑΡΙΣΤΗΣ.
- (in Greek) Συναξαριστής. 27 Δεκεμβρίου. ECCLESIA.GR. (H ΕΚΚΛΗΣΙΑ ΤΗΣ ΕΛΛΑΔΟΣ).

Russian Sources

- (in Russian) 9 января (27 декабря). Православная Энциклопедия под редакцией Патриарха Московского и всея Руси Кирилла (электронная версия). (Orthodox Encyclopedia - Pravenc.ru).
- (in Russian) 27 декабря (ст.ст.) 9 января 2015 (нов. ст.). Русская Православная Церковь Отдел внешних церковных связей. (DECR).
