= Girolamo Santacroce =

Italian sculptor

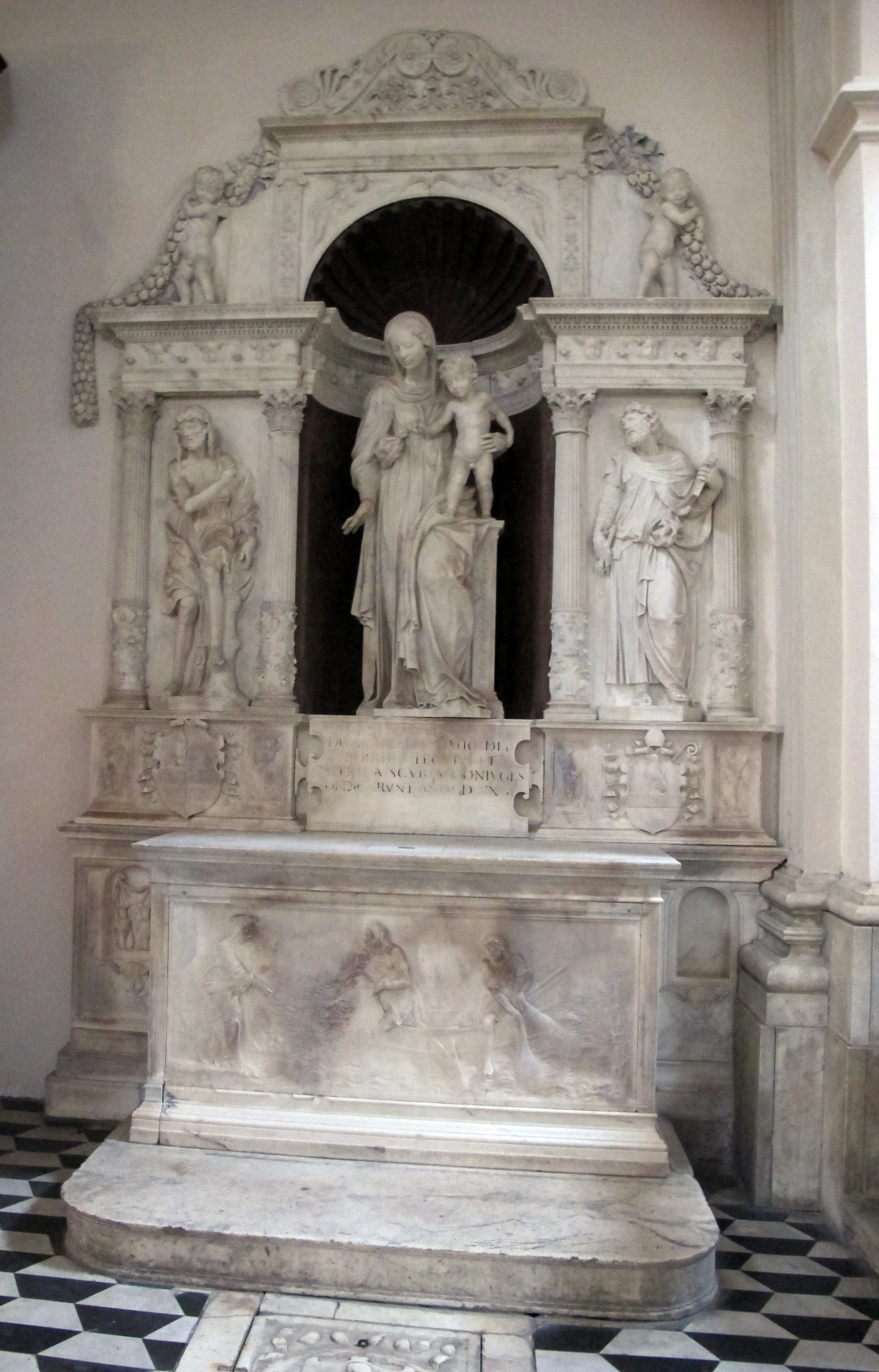
altarpiece by Girolamo Santacroce, Sant'Anna dei Lombardi, 1524

Girolamo Santacroce (c. 1502 – c. 1537) was a 16th-century Italian sculptor and medalist of the Renaissance period, active mainly in Naples.
