= Emergency Rescuer's Day =

Professional holiday in Russia

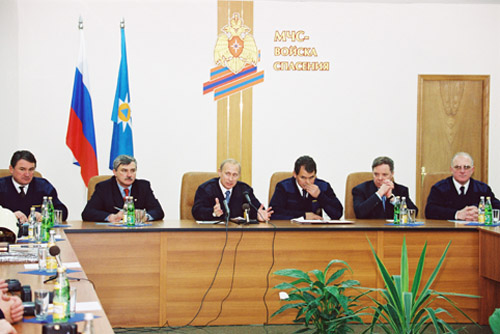
President Vladimir Putin visiting Rescue Centre No. 179 of the Ministry of Civil Defence, Emergencies and Disaster Relief.

Emergency Rescuer's Day (Russian: День спасателя) is a professional holiday of Russian emergency service workers, observed annually on 27 December when the Russian Emergency Rescue Corps was established in 1990, according to the Decree of the Council of Ministers of the Russian SSR. The holiday itself was established by the Presidential Decree of Boris Yeltsin No. 1306 "On the Establishment of the Day of the Emergency Rescuer of the Russian Federation" on 26 November 1995.

Traditionally, the majority of Russian emergency rescuers on this day stay on duty. It is estimated that the Russian emergency services save over 100,000 lives annually. According to official estimates, in 2013 the number of those who died in emergency situations in Russia decreased by 40%.
