= Ridable miniature railway =

Ultra-narrow-gauge railway on which people can ride

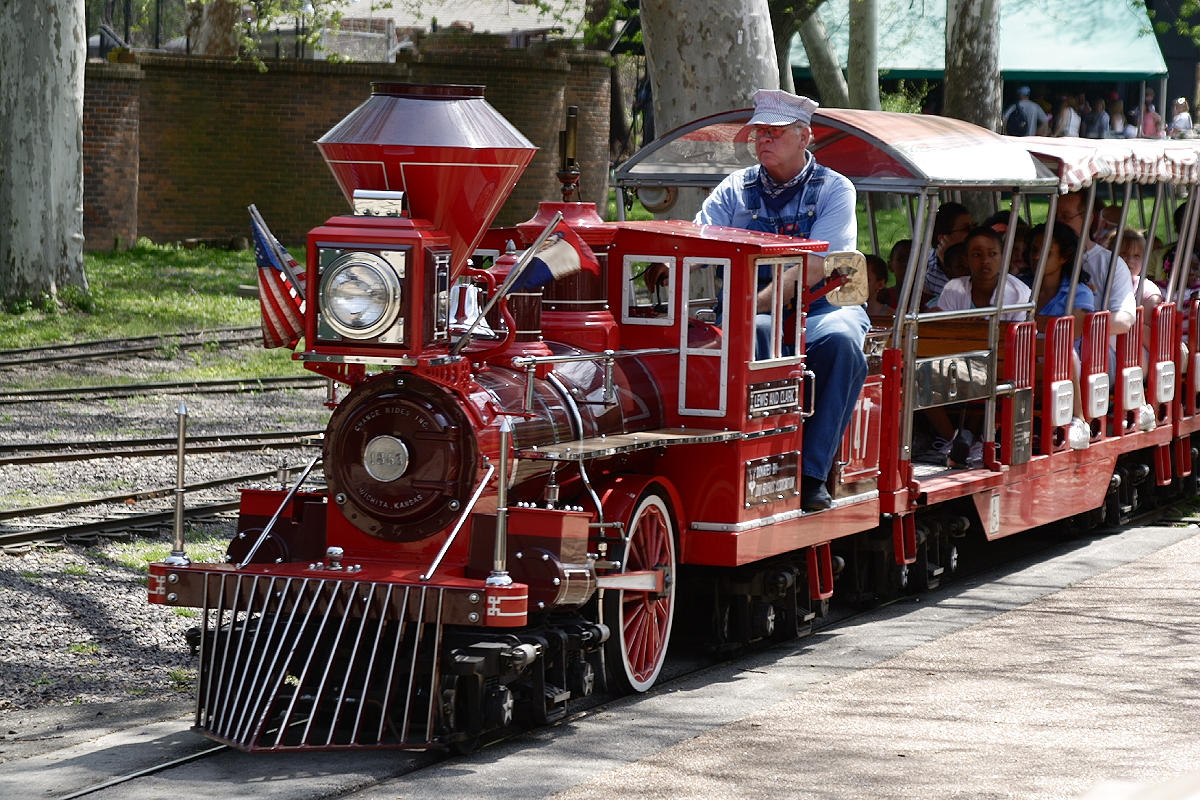
Emerson Zooline Railroad's Chance Rides C. P. Huntington train in Saint Louis Zoo, one of hundreds of exact copies of this ride model in locations worldwide

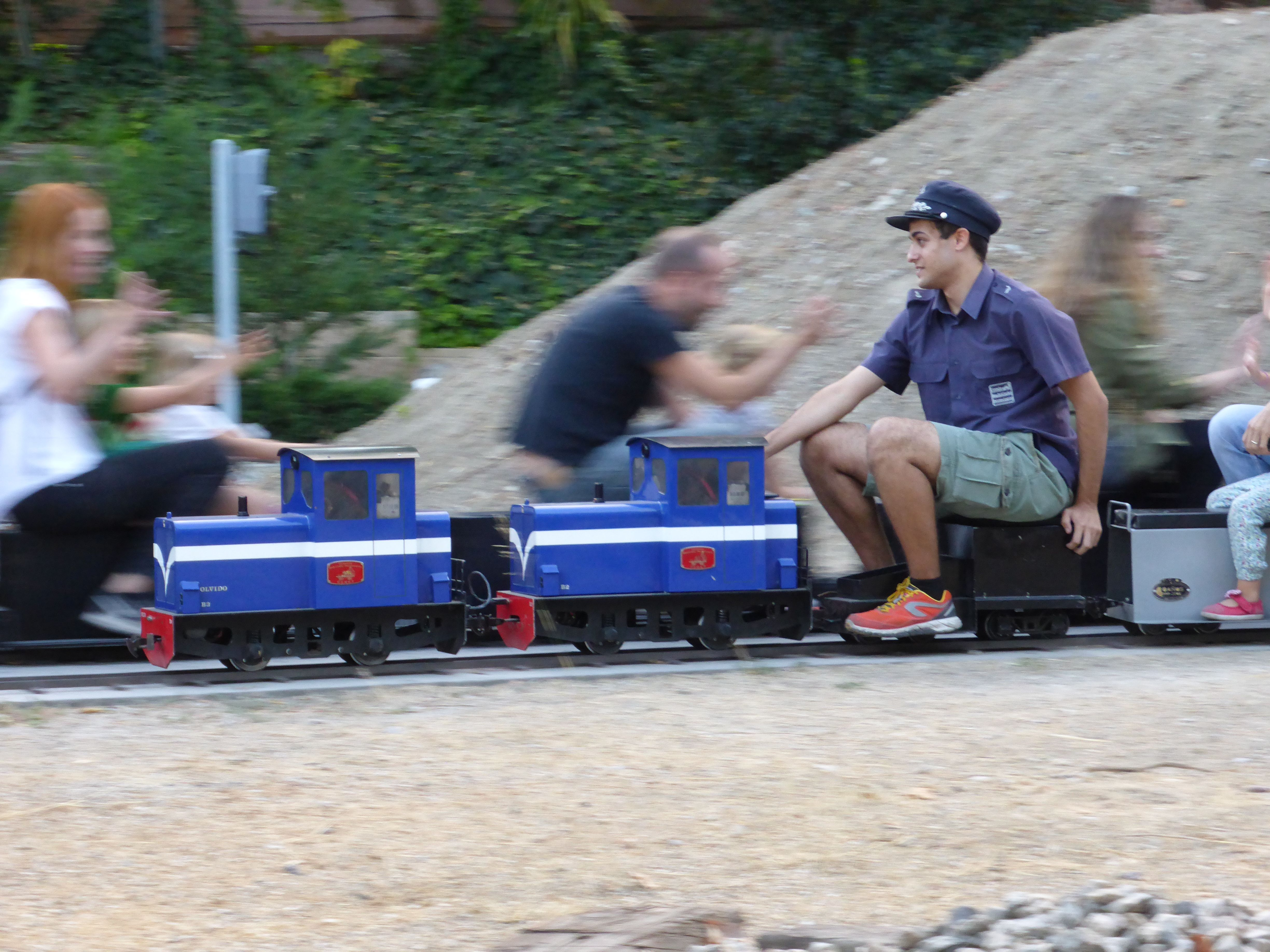
Delicias station in Madrid, Spain

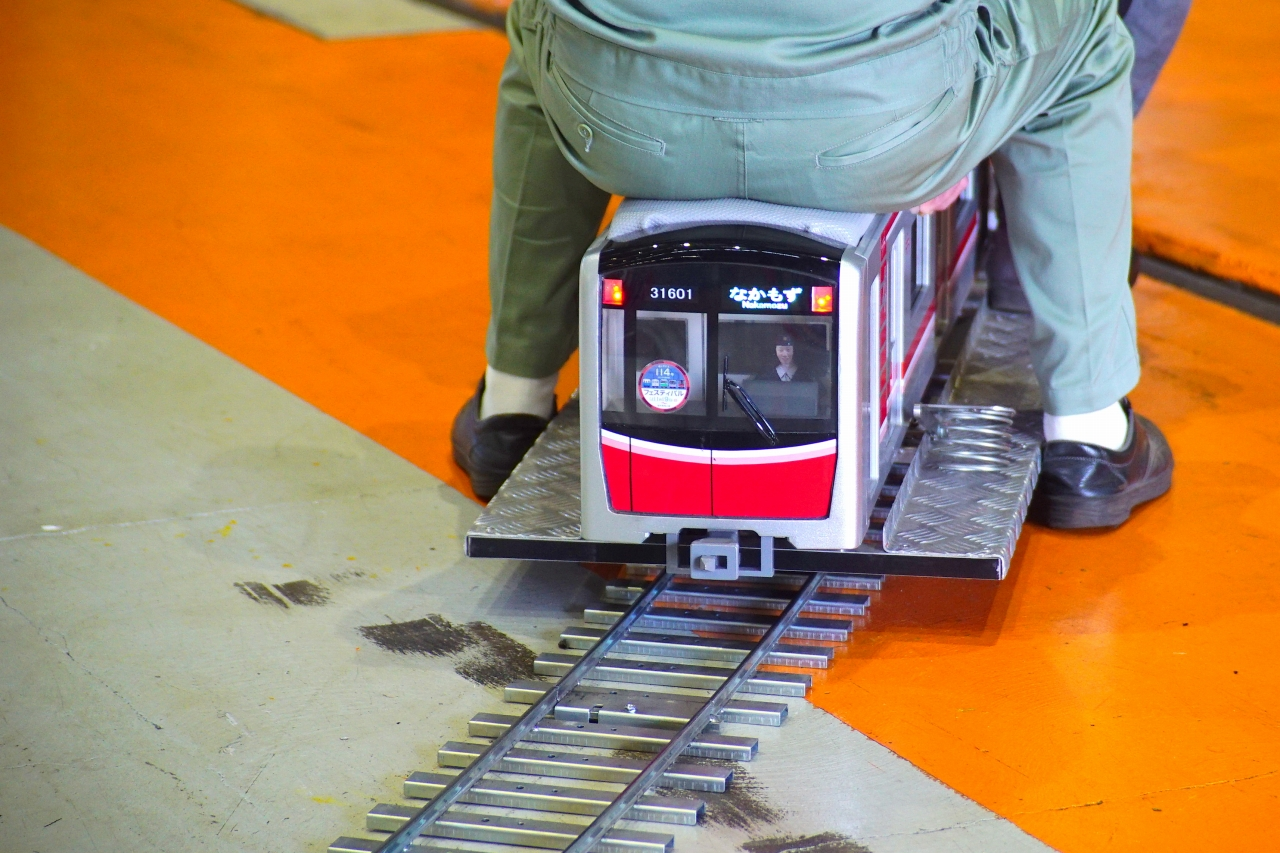
5 in (127 mm) miniature railways of Osaka Metro, Japan. They are modeled after the real 30000 series train.

A ridable miniature railway (US: riding railroad or grand scale railroad) is a large scale, usually ground-level railway that hauls passengers using locomotives that are often models of full-sized railway locomotives (powered by diesel or petrol engines, live steam or electric motors).

== Overview ==
Typically miniature railways have a rail track gauge between 5 in (127 mm) and under 15 in (381 mm), though both larger and smaller gauges are used.

At gauges of 5 in (127 mm) and less, the track is commonly raised above ground level. Flat cars are arranged with foot boards so that driver and passengers sit astride the track. The track is often multi-gauged, to accommodate 5 in (127 mm), 3 1/2 in (89 mm), and sometimes 2 1/2 in (64 mm) gauge locomotives.

The smaller gauges of miniature railway track can also be portable and is generally 3 1/2 in (89 mm)/5 in (127 mm) gauge on raised track or as 7 1/4 in (184 mm)/10 1/4 in (260 mm) on ground level. Typically portable track is used to carry passengers at temporary events such as fêtes and summer fairs.

Typically miniature lines are operated by not for profit organisations - often model engineering societies - though some are entirely in private grounds and others operate commercially.

There are many national organisations representing and providing guidance on miniature railway operations including the Australian Association of Live Steamers and Southern Federation of Model Engineering Societies.

== In the United Kingdom ==
The first miniature railways were built in the United Kingdom, as actual methods of transportation, such as the Jaywick railway.

=== Railways built in 19th century ===
The Duffield Bank Railway was built by Sir Arthur Percival Heywood in the grounds of his house on a hillside overlooking Duffield, Derbyshire in 1874. Although the Ordnance Survey map circa 1880 does not show the railway itself, it does show two tunnels and two signal posts. However, the online map archive of the National Library of Scotland includes a map of 1914 from the 25 inches to the foot series (Derbyshire XLV.9) that shows the full extent of the railway. Sir Arthur wished to explore the possibilities of minimum gauge railways for mining, quarrying, agriculture etc. He believed that they would be relatively easy to build, and to move. He saw possibilities for military railways behind the lines carrying ammunition and supplies.

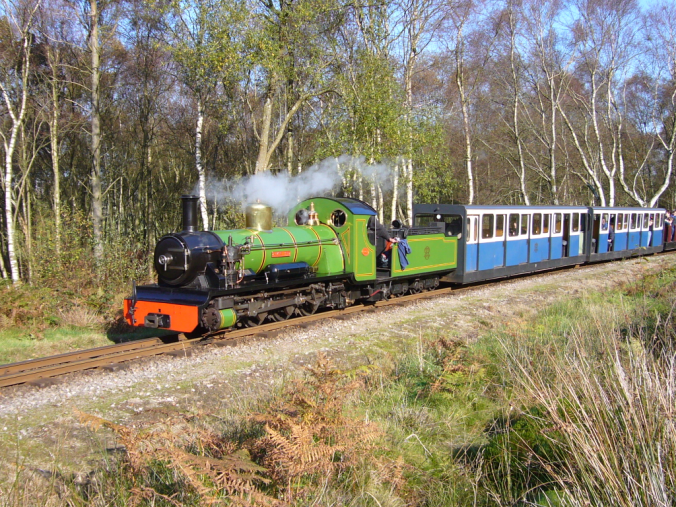
Ravenglass and Eskdale Railway

The original Ravenglass and Eskdale Railway was a 3 ft (914 mm) line opened on 24 May 1875 to transport hematite iron ore from three mines near and around the village of Boot to the Furness Railway standard gauge line at Ravenglass. In the early 1880s, a tramway was built between Beckfoot and another mine at Gill Force. Locals and railway enthusiasts formed Ravenglass and Eskdale Railway Preservation Society to save the line, with financial backing by Sir Wavell Wakefield, Member of Parliament (MP) for Marylebone and owner of the Ullswater Steamers. In September 1960, the society made the winning bid and saved the railway from closure. Control of the railway passed to a new private company, with the backing of the preservation society, an arrangement that is still in place.

=== Railways built in 20th century ===
The Downs Light Railway is the world's oldest private miniature railway, with a track gauge of 9 1/2 in (241 mm). The railway was built and opened in 1925 under the guidance of Geoffrey Hoyland (Headmaster) as a 7 1/4 in (184 mm) gauge railway, for the principal purpose of education. The railway is located within the grounds of The Downs Malvern, a private school in Colwall, near the town of Malvern, Worcestershire in the English Midlands. It is owned by the 'Downs Light Railway Trust. It is maintained and operated principally by the school children, aged between 7 and 13 years. It is part of the Heritage Railway Association membership.

The Jaywick Miniature Railway was built by FC Stedman, who owned the Jaywick Sands Estate on the Essex coast just south of Clacton-on-Sea. This railway was built in order to transport individual potential buyers to view the homes for sale. It was built in 1935, by Miniature Railway & Specialists Engineering, of Terminus Road, Eastbourne.

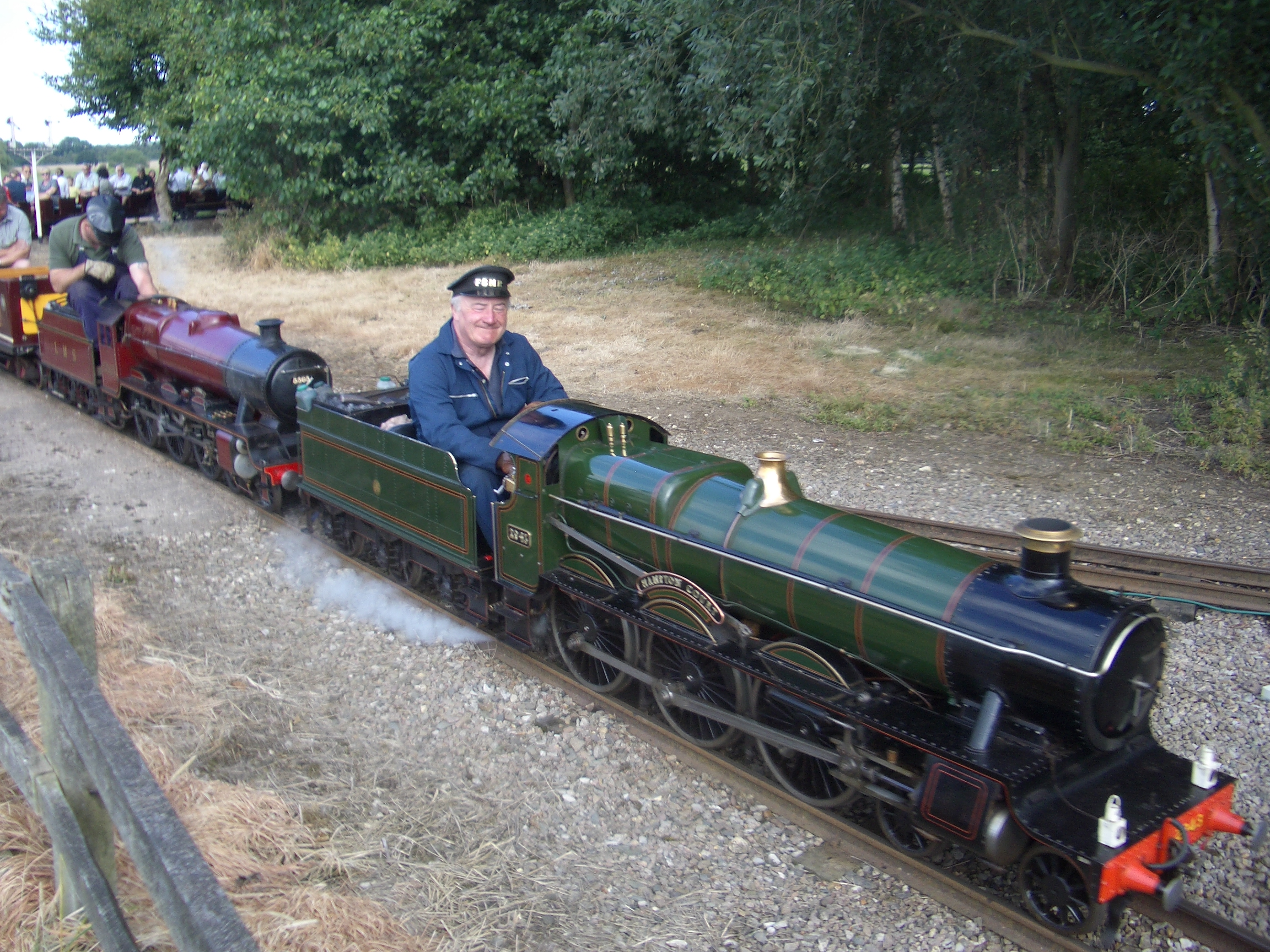
Stapleford Miniature Railway

Stapleford Miniature Railway is an historic steam locomotive-hauled 10 1/4 in (260 mm) gauge railway at Stapleford Park, Stapleford near Melton Mowbray in Leicestershire, England. Considered one of the finest examples of its type, the railway is now private but still attracts thousands of visitors from the UK and abroad during its two public charity events each year.

== Distinctions between model, miniature, and minimum-gauge railway ==
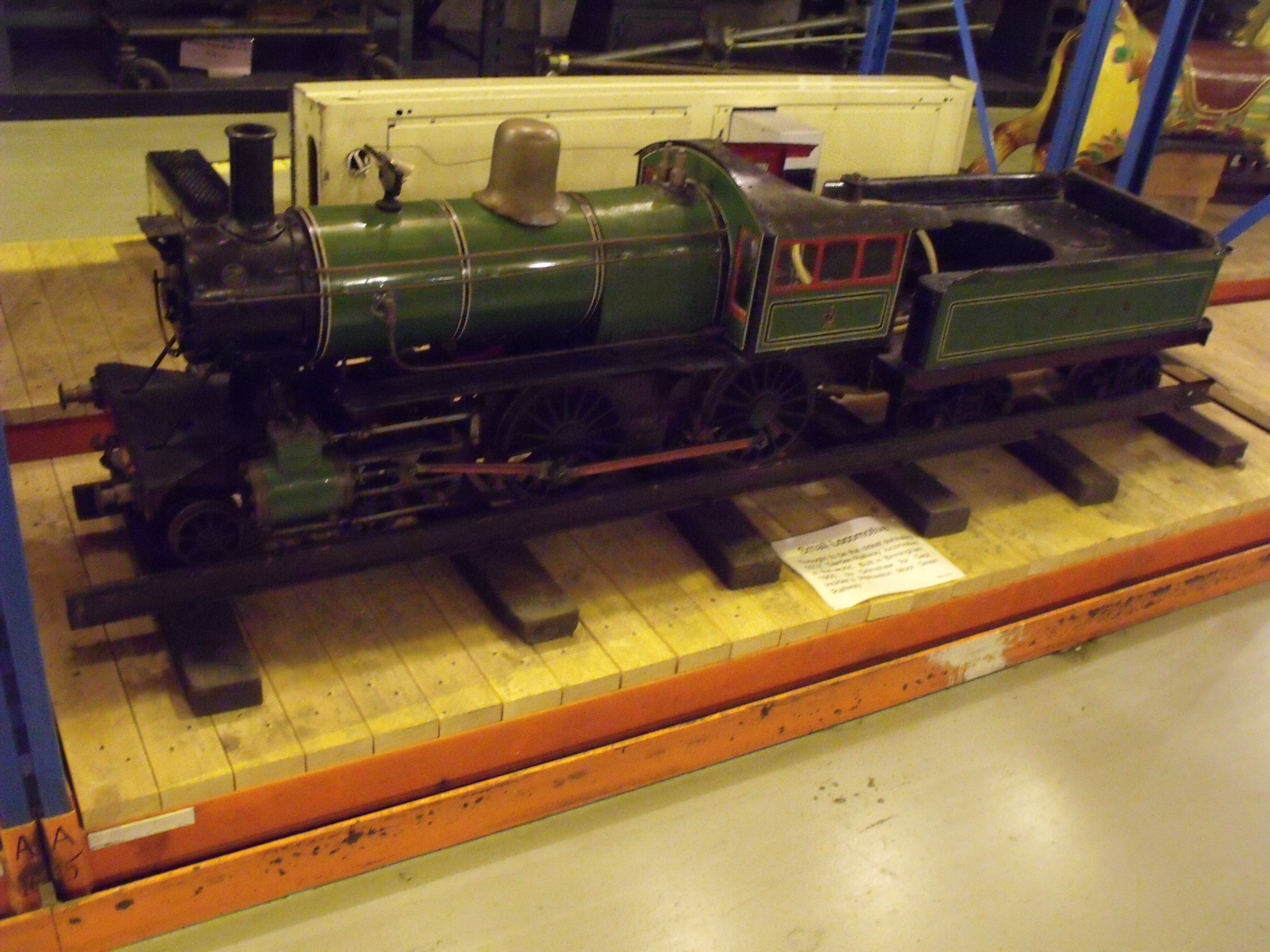
This is a 4-4-0 live steam locomotive. Thought to be the oldest surviving 10¼" 'Garden Railway' Locomotive in the world. Built in Birmingham, 1900, by Grimshaw for Capt. Holder's Pitmaston Moor Green Railway.

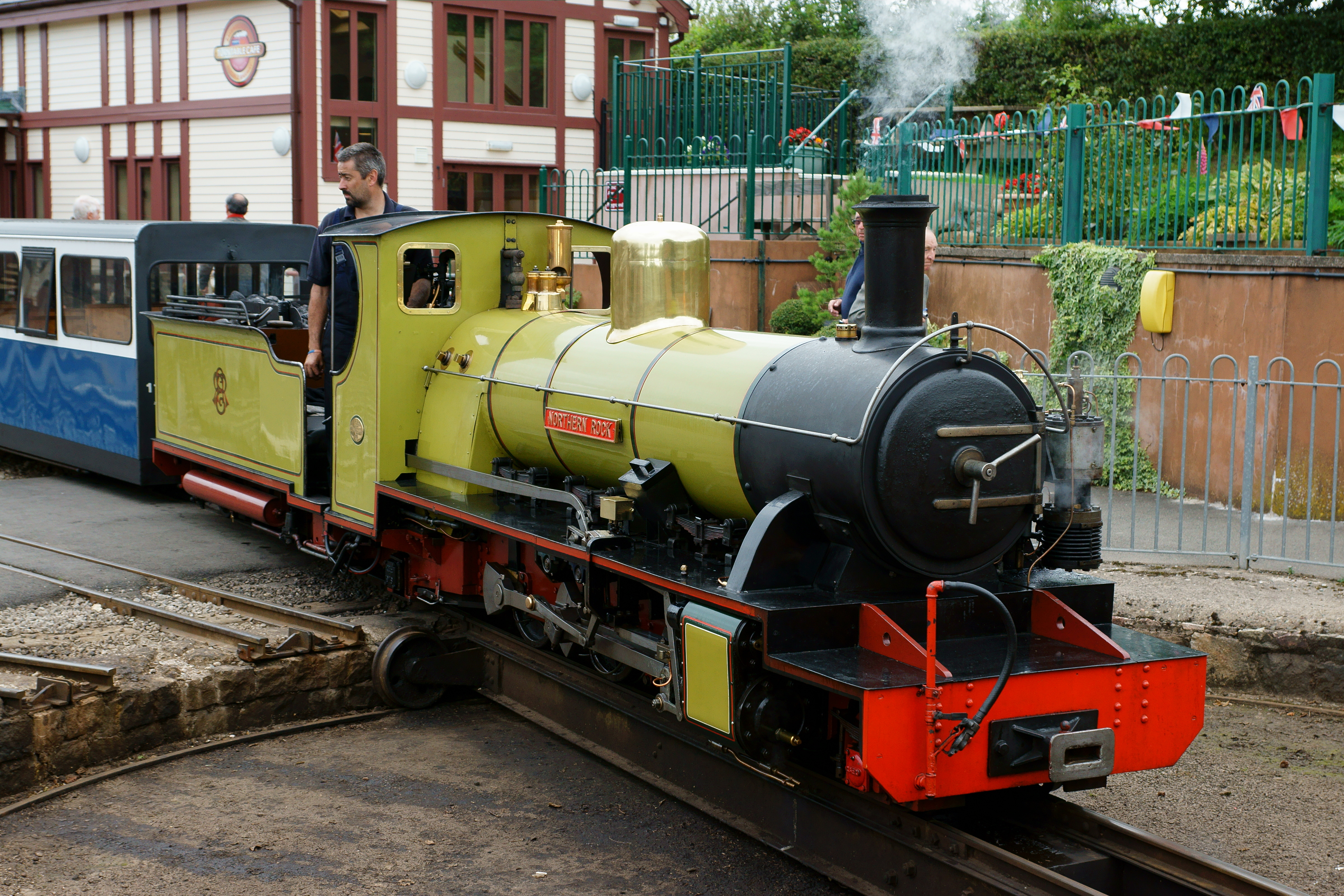
A minimum-gauge locomotive Northern Rock on the Ravenglass and Eskdale Railway

A 'model railway' is one where the gauge is too small for people to ride on the trains. Due to the use of mixed gauge tracks, passengers may ride on a miniature railway which shares the same gauge as, and is pulled by, a large model locomotive on a smaller model gauge, although this is rare.

'Miniature railways' are railways that can be ridden by people and are used for pleasure/as a pastime for their constructors and passengers. In the US, miniature railways are also known as 'riding railroads' or 'grand scale railroads'. The track gauges recognised as being miniature railways vary by country, but in the UK the maximum gauge is 350 mm (13 25/32 in).

A 'minimum-gauge railway', which generally starts at 15 in (381 mm) gauge, is one that was originally conceived as a commercial railway with small gauge track, with a working function as an estate railway, an industrial railway, or a provider of public transport links, such as the Romney, Hythe and Dymchurch Railway, Fairbourne Railway or the Ravenglass and Eskdale Railway.

In the UK, a gauge of 350 mm (13 25/32 in) [or above] or crossing a carriageway are the criteria used by the Office of Rail and Road (ORR), at which a railway is no longer classed as miniature and is therefore subject to formal regulation: they may be minor railways and/or heritage railways; the concept of minimum gauge is not recognised for the purposes of regulation.

=== Gauge ===
There are over 1,000 miniature railways open to the public around the world, not counting private railways, with 7 1/4 in (184 mm) gauge being by far the most numerous. Many layouts have dual-gauge track combing two, three or even more different gauges.

== Miniature railways ==
Name	Gauge	Country	Location	Notes
Rainsbrook Valley Railway	Mixed gauges 7 1/4 in (184 mm); 5 in (127 mm); 3 1/2 in (89 mm); 2 1/2 in (64 mm)	(United Kingdom) UK	Rugby, Warwickshire	
Evergreens Miniature Railway	Mixed gauges 5 in (127 mm); 7 1/4 in (184 mm)	(United Kingdom) UK	Keal Cotes, Lincolnshire, PE23 4AE	https://evergreensminiaturerailway.org/
Great Northern & Cascade Railway		(United States) US	Skykomish, Washington	
Grantchester Woodland Railway (Cambridge & District Model Engineering Society).	Mixed gauges: 3 1/2 in (89 mm); 5 in (127 mm); 7 1/4 in (184 mm)	(United Kingdom) UK	Grantchester, Cambridge, Cambridgeshire	Ground level: triple gauge 3 1/2 in (89 mm), 5 in (127 mm) and 7 1/4 in (184 mm)
Burton upon Trent Model Engineering Society.	Mixed gauges: 3 1/2 in (89 mm); 5 in (127 mm); 7 1/4 in (184 mm)	(United Kingdom) UK	Burton upon Trent, Staffordshire	Raised track: 3 1/2 in (89 mm) and 5 in (127 mm); Ground level: dual gauge 5 in (127 mm) and 7 1/4 in (184 mm)
Canterbury Society of Model and Experimental Engineers	Mixed gauges: 2 1/2 in (64 mm); 3 1/2 in (89 mm); 5 in (127 mm); 7 1/4 in (184 mm)	New Zealand	Halswell Domain, Christchurch	Canterbury Society of Model and Experimental Engineers. Host of 2006 CANMOD International Convention.
West Wiltshire Society of Model Engineers	Mixed gauges: 3 1/2 in (89 mm); 5 in (127 mm)	(United Kingdom) UK	Westbury, Wiltshire	Primarily a Model Engineering society with regular open days for the public.
Kapiti Miniature Railway and Model Engineering Society Inc	Mixed gauges: 2 1/2 in (64 mm); 3 1/2 in (89 mm); 5 in (127 mm); 7 1/4 in (184 mm)	New Zealand	Paraparaumu	
Maidstone Model Engineering Society	Mixed gauges: 2 1/2 in (64 mm); 3 1/2 in (89 mm); 5 in (127 mm)	New Zealand	Maidstone Park; Upper Hutt	
Nelson Society of Modellers	Mixed gauges: 2 1/2 in (64 mm); 3 1/2 in (89 mm); 5 in (127 mm); 6 1/4 in (159 mm); 7 1/4 in (184 mm)	New Zealand	Nelson	
New Plymouth Society of Model and Experimental Engineers	Mixed gauges: 2 1/2 in (64 mm); 3 1/2 in (89 mm); 5 in (127 mm)	New Zealand	New Plymouth	
Tauranga Model Marine and Engineering Clubs	Mixed gauges: 2 1/2 in (64 mm); 3 1/2 in (89 mm); 5 in (127 mm)	New Zealand	Tauranga	
Wirral Model Engineers Society	Mixed gauges: 2 1/2 in (64 mm); 3 1/2 in (89 mm); 5 in (127 mm)	(United Kingdom) UK	Royden Park, Wirral	
Canberra Miniature Railway	3 1/2 in (89 mm)	Australia	Canberra, Australia	
S.A.S.M.E.E. Park	3 1/2 in (89 mm)	Australia	Adelaide, Australia	
Hamilton Model Engineers	Mixed gauges: 3 1/2 in (89 mm); 5 in (127 mm); 7 1/4 in (184 mm)	New Zealand	Minogue Park, Hamilton	Founded 1931. At Minogue Park since 1983.
Hawkes Bay Model Engineering Society	Mixed gauges: 3 1/2 in (89 mm); 5 in (127 mm)	New Zealand	Napier	
Hutt Valley Model Engineering Society	Mixed gauges: 3 1/2 in (89 mm); 5 in (127 mm); 7 1/4 in (184 mm)	New Zealand	Lower Hutt	
Manukau Live Steamers	Mixed gauges: 3 1/2 in (89 mm); 5 in (127 mm); 7 1/4 in (184 mm)	New Zealand	Manukau	
Abbeydale miniature railway	Mixed gauges: 3 1/2 in (89 mm); 5 in (127 mm); 7 1/4 in (184 mm)	(United Kingdom) UK	Sheffield	Raised track: triple 3 1/2 in (89 mm), 5 in (127 mm) and 7 1/4 in (184 mm); Ground level: dual gauge 5 in (127 mm) and 7 1/4 in (184 mm) in
Ashton Court Railway	Mixed gauges: 3 1/2 in (89 mm); 5 in (127 mm); 7 1/4 in (184 mm)	(United Kingdom) UK	Bristol	Raised track: 3 1/2 in (89 mm) and 5 in (127 mm); Ground level: dual gauge 5 in (127 mm) and 7 1/4 in (184 mm)
Barton House Railway	Mixed gauges: 3 1/2 in (89 mm); 7 1/4 in (184 mm)	(United Kingdom) UK	Wroxham, Norfolk	
Bridgend Miniature Railway	Mixed gauges: 3 1/2 in (89 mm); 5 in (127 mm); 7 1/4 in (184 mm)	(United Kingdom) UK	Bridgend	
Caldecotte Miniature Railway	Mixed gauges: 3 1/2 in (89 mm); 5 in (127 mm); 7 1/4 in (184 mm)	(United Kingdom) UK	Milton Keynes, Buckinghamshire	Caldecotte Miniature Railway has a specially built disabled carriage.
Canvey Railway and Model Engineering Club	3 1/2 in (89 mm)	(United Kingdom) UK	Canvey Island, Essex	Raised track dual gauge 3 1/2 in (89 mm) and 5 in (127 mm)
Chelmsford City Miniature Railway	Mixed gauges: 3 1/2 in (89 mm); 5 in (127 mm); 7 1/4 in (184 mm)	(United Kingdom) UK	Chelmsford	Operated by Chelmsford Society of Model Engineers
Cinderbarrow Miniature Railway	Mixed gauges: 3 1/2 in (89 mm); 5 in (127 mm); 7 1/4 in (184 mm)	(United Kingdom) UK	Yealand Redmayne, Lancashire	
Crowborough Miniature Railway	3 1/2 in (89 mm)	(United Kingdom) UK	East Sussex	Raised track & Ground Track (formally) dual gauge 3 1/2 in (89 mm) and 5 in (127 mm)
Cutteslowe Park Miniature Railway	3 1/2 in (89 mm)	(United Kingdom) UK	Oxford, Oxfordshire	
Derwen Fawr Miniature Railway	Mixed gauges: 3 1/2 in (89 mm); 5 in (127 mm)	(United Kingdom) UK	Swansea, Wales	Operated by the Swansea Society of Model Engineers
Keighley & District Model Engineering Society Marley Railway (KDMES)	Mixed gauges: 3 1/2 in (89 mm); 5 in (127 mm)	(United Kingdom) UK	Keighley, West Yorkshire	The KDMES trains operate a 1,200 ft (370 m) scenic oval raised level track located at the Marley Activity Centre in Keighley. The railway is open for public rides during the summer, and available for private functions and corporate events.
Leyland Society of Model Engineers	3 1/2 in (89 mm) and 5 in (127 mm) on raised level, and 7 1/4 in (184 mm) ground level	(United Kingdom) UK	Lancashire	
Maidstone Model Engineering Society	3 1/2 in (89 mm)	(United Kingdom) UK	Mote Park, Maidstone, Kent	
Malden and District Society of Model Engineers Ltd	Mixed Gauges: 3 1/2 in (89 mm); 5 in (127 mm); 7 1/4 in (184 mm)	(United Kingdom) UK	Thames Ditton, Surrey	
Mid Cheshire Society of Model Engineers	Mixed gauges: 3 1/2 in (89 mm); 5 in (127 mm); 7 1/4 in (184 mm)	(United Kingdom) UK	Sandiway, Cheshire	
North London Society of Model Engineers (NLSME)	3 1/2 in (89 mm); 5 in (127 mm); 7 1/4 in (184 mm)	(United Kingdom) UK	Hertfordshire	
Pembrey Miniature Railway	Mixed gauges: 3 1/2 in (89 mm); 5 in (127 mm); 7 1/4 in (184 mm)	(United Kingdom) UK	Pembrey Country Park, Carmarthenshire	
Polegate & District Model Engineering Club (PADMEC)	Mixed gauges: 3 1/2 in (89 mm); 5 in (127 mm)	(United Kingdom) UK	Polegate, East Sussex	Raised track: dual gauge 3 1/2 in (89 mm) and 5 in (127 mm)
Ridgeway Park light railway	3 1/2 in (89 mm)	(United Kingdom) UK	Chingford, London	
Roxbourne Railway	Mixed gauges: 3 1/2 in (89 mm); 5 in (127 mm); 7 1/4 in (184 mm)	(United Kingdom) UK	Roxbourne Park, Field End Rd, Ruislip HA4 9PB	Operated by Harrow and Wembley Society of Model Engineers
Gilling Railway	Mixed gauges: 3 1/2 in (89 mm); 5 in (127 mm); 7 1/4 in (184 mm)	(United Kingdom) UK	Gilling East, Yorkshire	Operated by Ryedale Society of Model Engineers Limited.
Spenborough Model & Experimental Engineers Ltd	3 1/2 in (89 mm)	(United Kingdom) UK	Cleckheaton, West Yorkshire, BD19 5LL	
Staines Society of Model Engineers	Mixed gauges: 2 1/2 in (64 mm); 3 1/2 in (89 mm); 5 in (127 mm)	(United Kingdom) UK	Staines Park, Staines, Surrey	Raised track.
Tonbridge Model Engineering Society	3 1/2 in (89 mm)	(United Kingdom) UK	Kent	
Tyneside Society of Model & Experimental Engineers	Mixed gauges: 3 1/2 in (89 mm); 5 in (127 mm); 7 1/4 in (184 mm)	(United Kingdom) UK	Exhibition Park, Newcastle upon Tyne	
Welling and District Model Engineering Society	Mixed gauges: 3 1/2 in (89 mm); 5 in (127 mm)	United Kingdom	Hall Place, Bexley	Opening 2022.
La Cañada Valley Railroad	4 3/4 in (121 mm)	(United States) US	Flintridge, California	Located at the home of Disney animator Ollie Johnston. Influenced the design of Walt Disney's Carolwood Pacific Railroad. Defunct.
Canberra Miniature Railway	5 in (127 mm)	Australia	Canberra	
Hornsby Model Engineers, Galston, NSW	5 in (127 mm)	Australia	Galston, New South Wales	5 in (127 mm)
Illawarra Live Steamers	5 in (127 mm)	Australia	North Wollongong	The ground level track is 5 in (127 mm). The elevated track is 5 in (127 mm), 3 1/2 in (89 mm) and 2 1/2 in (64 mm). There is also a garden gauge track inside the elevated track.
Northern Districts Model Engineering Society	5 in (127 mm)	Australia	Balcatta, Western Australia	2 1/2 in (64 mm), 3 1/2 in (89 mm), 5 in (127 mm) and 7 1/4 in (184 mm)
Portarlington Miniature Railway	5 in (127 mm)	Australia	Victoria	5 in (127 mm) and 7 1/4 in (184 mm)
S.A.S.M.E.E. Park	5 in (127 mm)	Australia	Adelaide	
Sydney Live Steam Locomotive Society	5 in (127 mm)	Australia	West Ryde, New South Wales	5 in / 127 mm and 89 mm / 3 1/2 in and 64 mm / 2 1/2 in
Willans Hill Miniature Railway	5 in (127 mm)	Australia	Wagga Wagga, NSW	Located in Wagga Wagga Botanic Gardens. Includes spiral based on Bethungra Spiral.
Petit Train à Vapeur de Forest	Mixed gauges: 5 in (127 mm); 7 1/4 in (184 mm)	Belgium	Brussels	
Stoomgroep Turnhout	5 in (127 mm)	Belgium	Turnhout	5 in (127 mm) ground track
Mini train des marais	Mixed gauge: 5 in (127 mm); 7 1/4 in (184 mm)	France	Saint-Lô	
Petit train des Templiers	Mixed gauge: 5 in (127 mm); 7 1/4 in (184 mm)	France	Épinay-sur-Orge	Two circuits of 350 meters in 5 in (127 mm) and 7 1/4 in (184 mm). Nine electric locomotives and diesel. Mainly French locomotives. Open some Sundays from March to November.
Anyoji Garden Railway	5 in (127 mm)	Japan	Toyoura, Yamaguchi, Shimonoseki City	3 1/2 in (89 mm) and 5 in (127 mm)
Hakuba Mini Train Park	5 in (127 mm)	Japan	Hakuba, Nagano	
Ichikawa Live Steamers	5 in (127 mm)	Japan	Ichikawa, Chiba, Tokyo	
Sakuragi Railway	5 in (127 mm)	Japan	Kumamoto City, Kumamoto	3 1/2 in (89 mm) and 5 in (127 mm)
Hitoyoshi Live Steam Club	5 in (127 mm)	Japan	Hitoyoshi, Kumamoto	Mixed gauges: 3 1/2 in (89 mm); 5 in (127 mm); 7 1/4 in (184 mm)
Stoomgroep West Zuiderpark	5 in (127 mm)	Netherlands	The Hague	3 1/2 in (89 mm) and 5 in (127 mm) mixed raised oval.
Eastern Bay of Plenty Model Engineering Society	Mixed gauges: 5 in (127 mm); 7 1/4 in (184 mm)	New Zealand	Whakatane	
Havelock North and Live Steamers Associated	Mixed gauges: 5 in (127 mm)	New Zealand	Havelock North, Hastings	
Hawkes Bay Model Engineering Society	5 in (127 mm)	New Zealand	Anderson Park, Napier	3 1/2 in (89 mm) and 5 in (127 mm)
Palmerston North Model Engineering Club Inc	Mixed gauges: 5 in (127 mm); 7 1/4 in (184 mm)	New Zealand	Palmerston North	
Thames Small Gauge Railway Society	Mixed gauges: 5 in (127 mm); 7 1/4 in (184 mm)	New Zealand	Thames	Started in 1995 with a station on the site of the Grahamstown station of the Thames Branch.
Whangarei Model Engineering Club	Mixed gauges: 5 in (127 mm); 7 1/4 in (184 mm)	New Zealand	Whangarei	
Ferrocarril de las Delicias	5 in (127 mm)	Spain	Madrid	Located inside Madrid's Railway Museum
Swiss Vapeur Parc	5 in (127 mm)	Switzerland	Le Bouveret	Dual gauge: 7 1/4 in / 184 mm and 5 in / 127 mm.
Beech Hurst Park Miniature Railway	5 in (127 mm)	(United Kingdom) UK	Haywards Heath, West Sussex	Raised track dual 3 1/2 in (89 mm) and 5 in (127 mm)
Bushey Miniature Railway	5 in (127 mm)	(United Kingdom) UK	Hertfordshire	A 5 in (127 mm) gauge miniature railway in Bushey, Herts consisting of 230 ft or 70 m ground level track with various sidings and two bridges. A private railway, but viewing and rides are available by appointment.
Canvey Railway and Model Engineering Club	5 in (127 mm)	(United Kingdom) UK	Canvey Island, Essex	Raised track dual gauge 3 1/2 in (89 mm) and 5 in (127 mm)
Copsewood Miniature Railway	5 in (127 mm)	(United Kingdom) UK	Copsewood Sports Ground, Binley, Coventry	Also 3 1/2 in (89 mm) & 7 1/4 in (184 mm) gauges
Cutteslowe Park Miniature Railway	5 in (127 mm)	(United Kingdom) UK	Oxford, Oxfordshire	Raised & ground level
Dampf-Bahn-Club Sprockhövel	Mixed gauges: 5 in (127 mm); 7 1/4 in (184 mm)	(Germany) GER	Sprockhövel-Haßlinghausen	Includes steel bridge with underpass
East Grinstead Model Engineering Society	5 in (127 mm)	(United Kingdom) UK	East Grinstead, West Sussex	Portable ground level
Eaton Park Miniature Railway	5 in (127 mm)	(United Kingdom) UK	Norwich	Two lines, one 3 1/2 in (89 mm) and 5 in (127 mm) gauge track, one mixed 5 in (127 mm) and 7 1/4 in (184 mm) inch gauge
Leyland Society of Model Engineers	5 in (127 mm)	(United Kingdom) UK	Lancashire	
Maidstone Model Engineering Society	5 in (127 mm)	(United Kingdom) UK	Mote Park, Maidstone, Kent	
Mount Edgcumbe House Railway	5 in (127 mm)	UK	Mount Edgcumbe House, Cremyll, Cornwall	
Ribble Valley Live Steamers	5 in (127 mm)	(United Kingdom) UK	Clitheroe, Lancashire	Also 2 1/2 in (64 mm) & 3 1/2 in (89 mm) gauges
Ridgeway Park light railway	5 in (127 mm)	(United Kingdom) UK	Chingford, London	
Riverside Miniature Railway	Mixed gauges: 5 in (127 mm); 7 1/4 in (184 mm)	(United Kingdom) UK	St Neots, Cambridgeshire	
Ryton Pools Miniature Railway	5 in (127 mm)	(United Kingdom) UK	Ryton Pools Country Park	Coventry Model Engineering Society. Also 3 1/2 in (89 mm) gauge.
Spenborough Model & Experimental Engineers Ltd	5 in (127 mm)	(United Kingdom) UK	Cleckheaton, West Yorkshire BD19 5LL	
Wimbourne District Society of Model Engineers	5 in (127 mm)	(United Kingdom) UK	Dorset	5 in (127 mm) and a short raised level | 3 1/2 in (89 mm) and | 2 1/2 in (64 mm) track
Modelbouwvereniging Hoekse Waard	Mixed Gauges: 5 in (127 mm); 7 1/4 in (184 mm)	Netherlands	Barendrecht, Zuid-Holland	
Altona Miniature Railway	7 1/4 in (184 mm)	Australia	Victoria	5 in / 127 mm and 7 1/4 in / 184 mm
Box Hill Miniature Steam Railway	7 1/4 in (184 mm)	Australia	Victoria	5 in / 127 mm and 7 1/4 in / 184 mm
Campbelltown Miniature Passenger Railway	7 1/4 in (184 mm)	Australia	Victoria	
Castledare Miniature Railway	7 1/4 in (184 mm)	Australia	Wilson, Western Australia	
Cohunu Park Railway	7 1/4 in (184 mm)	Australia	Byford, Western Australia	
Diamond Valley Railway	7 1/4 in (184 mm)	Australia	Eltham Victoria	7 1/4 in / 184 mm
Canberra Miniature Railway	7 1/4 in (184 mm)	Australia	Canberra	
Melbourne Steam Traction Engine Club	12 in (305 mm)	Australia	Ferntree Gully Road Scoresby Victoria	
MVRail	7 1/4 in (184 mm)	Australia	Morphett Vale Railway, Morphett vale, Weatsheaf Rd, South Australia	
Central Coast Miniature Railway	7 1/4 in (184 mm)	Australia	Narara, New South Wales	5 in (127 mm) and 7 1/4 in (184 mm)
Penwood Railroad Inc.		Australia	Jaspers Brush, NSW	
Portarlington Miniature Railway	7 1/4 in (184 mm)	Australia	Victoria	5 in (127 mm) and 7 1/4 in (184 mm)
S.A.S.M.E.E. Park	7 1/4 in (184 mm)	Australia	Adelaide	
Willans Hill Miniature Railway	7 1/4 in (184 mm)	Australia	Wagga Wagga, NSW	
Stoomgroep Turnhout vzw	7 1/4 in (184 mm)	Belgium	Turnhout	
Golden Horseshoe Live Steamers	7 1/4 in (184 mm)	Canada	Hamilton, Ontario	
Roundhouse Park Miniature Railway	7 1/4 in (184 mm)	Canada	Toronto	Two locomotives (replica steam with tender and diesel-electric), four passenger cars and one caboose
Nábřeží paromilů dětská železnice	7 1/4 in (184 mm)	(Czech Republic) Czech	Hradec Králové, Bohemia	7 1/4 in / 184 mm and 5 in / 127 mm dual gauge
S.M.P.D. Parková dráha Olympia	7 1/4 in (184 mm)	(Czech Republic) Czech	Brno, Moravia	7 1/4 in (184 mm) + 5 in (127 mm) dual gauge
Finnish Railway Museum	7 1/4 in (184 mm)	Finland	Hyvinkää	
Petit train de grenade	7 1/4 in (184 mm)	France	Grenade	7 ^{1}/_{4} in (184 mm)
Parkbahn Schmiden	7 1/4 in (184 mm)	Germany	Fellbach	
Hungarian Railway Museum	7 1/4 in (184 mm)	Hungary	Budapest	
John F. Kennedy Arboretum	7 1/4 in (184 mm)	(Republic of Ireland) Ireland	Wexford	
Akubi Lightweight Railway	7 1/4 in (184 mm)	Japan		Previously located in Bentengaoka
Matsudayama Herb Garden	7 1/4 in (184 mm)	Japan	Matsuda, Kanagawa	Includes 1/6 scale Romancecar (Odakyu 10000 series HiSE) replica
Lankelz Railway	7 1/4 in (184 mm)	Luxembourg	Esch-sur-Alzette, south-eastern Luxembourg	
Stoomgroep West Zuiderpark	Ground level gauges: 7 1/4 in (184 mm) Mixed raised gauges: 3 1/2 in (89 mm) 5 in (127 mm)	Netherlands	The Hague	A sizeable network in "Zuiderpark", a big city park since 1975 in The Hague. The total length of the 7 1/4" gauge mainline routes combined is estimated at about 5 kilometers. Most of the track has working railway signalling, operated by signal boxes and a working full scale railroad crossing where the 7 1/4" tracks cross multiple (busy) public roads. The 3 1/2 in (89 mm) and 5 in (127 mm) gauges are mixed on a raised oval track.
Cambridge Model Engineering Society Inc	7 1/4 in (184 mm)	New Zealand	Cambridge	
Kapiti Miniature Railway & Associates	7 1/4 in (184 mm)	New Zealand	Raumati Marine Gardens, Raumati Beach	5 in / 127 mm and 7 1/4 in / 184 mm) dual gauge
Keirunga Park Railway	7 1/4 in (184 mm)	New Zealand	Havelock North	
Mana Ariki Railway Inc	7 1/4 in (184 mm)	New Zealand	Taumaranui	
Featherston Miniature Fell Society	7 1/4 in (184 mm)	New Zealand	Featherston, Wairarapa	
Pully	7 1/4 in (184 mm)	Switzerland		
Stainer Liliputbahn AG	7 1/4 in (184 mm)	Switzerland	Stein am Rhein	
Swiss Vapeur Parc	7 1/4 in (184 mm)	Switzerland	Le Bouveret	Dual gauge: 7 1/4 in / 184 mm and 5 in / 127 mm
There and Back Light Railway	7 1/4 in (184 mm)	(United Kingdom) UK	East Midlands	This railway is entirely portable and can be set up almost anywhere flat. Can be seen at events across the country and uses a Bagnall steam locomotive on a 450 ft (137.2 m) ground level track.
Acton Miniature Railway	7 1/4 in (184 mm)	(United Kingdom) UK	Acton London Transport Museum Depot, London	
Alexandra Park Miniature Railway	7 1/4 in (184 mm)	(United Kingdom) UK	Alexandra Park, Hastings	
Millerbeck Light Railway	7 1/4 in (184 mm)	(United Kingdom) UK	Staveley-in-Cartmel, Cumbria	Opened in 1985, privately owned, while opened to the public
Barking Park Light Railway	7 1/4 in (184 mm)	(United Kingdom) UK		Re-opened Easter 2009.
Barnards Miniature Railway	7 1/4 in (184 mm)	(United Kingdom) UK		
Barton House Railway	7 1/4 in (184 mm)	(United Kingdom) UK	Wroxham, Norfolk	
Beamish Cog Railway	7 1/4 in (184 mm)	(United Kingdom) UK	Beamish Museum, Durham	
Beer Heights Light Railway	7 1/4 in (184 mm)	(United Kingdom) UK	Devon	
Bekonscot Light Railway	7 1/4 in (184 mm)	(United Kingdom) UK	Buckinghamshire	
Bentley Miniature Railway	7 1/4 in (184 mm)	(United Kingdom) UK		
Bents Miniature Railway	7 1/4 in (184 mm)	(United Kingdom) UK	Warrington	1982–88
Brockwell Park Miniature Railway	7 1/4 in (184 mm)	(United Kingdom) UK	South London	1951–1961 & 2003–present
Brookside Miniature Railway	7 1/4 in (184 mm)	(United Kingdom) UK	Poynton	1988–99; closed Now running again under new management.
Canvey Railway and Model Engineering Club	7 1/4 in (184 mm)	(United Kingdom) UK	Canvey Island, Essex	Ground level
Coate Water Miniature Railway	7 1/4 in (184 mm)	(United Kingdom) UK	Coate Water Country Park, Swindon	Combined 7 1/4 in / 184 mm and 5 in / 127 mm
Conwy Valley Railway Museum Miniature Railway	7 1/4 in (184 mm) (also 15 in)	(United Kingdom) UK	Betws-y-Coed, Wales	
Cutteslowe Park	7 1/4 in (184 mm)	(United Kingdom) UK	Oxford, Oxfordshire	
Danson Park	7 1/4 in (184 mm)	(United Kingdom) UK	Bexleyheath	1946–1948
Dobwalls Forest Railroad	7 1/4 in (184 mm)	(United Kingdom) UK	Cornwall	Closed
Dragon Miniature Railway	7 1/4 in (184 mm)	(United Kingdom) UK	Marple, Greater Manchester	
Eastbourne Miniature Steam Railway	7 1/4 in (184 mm)	(United Kingdom) UK	East Sussex	
East Herts Miniature Railway	7 1/4 in (184 mm)	(United Kingdom) UK	Great Amwell near Ware, Hertfordshire	
Echills Wood Railway	7 1/4 in (184 mm)	(United Kingdom) UK	Kingsbury Water Park, Warwickshire	
Fancott Miniature Railway	7 1/4 in (184 mm)	(United Kingdom) UK	Bedfordshire	
Foxfield Miniature Railway	7 1/4 in (184 mm)	(United Kingdom) UK	Stoke-on-Trent	
Frimley Lodge Miniature Railway	7 1/4 in (184 mm)	(United Kingdom) UK		
Great Cockcrow Railway	7 1/4 in (184 mm)	(United Kingdom) UK		
Grosvenor Park Miniature Railway	7 1/4 in (184 mm)	(United Kingdom) UK	Chester	
Guildford Model Engineering Society	7 1/4 in (184 mm)	(United Kingdom) UK	Surrey	
Halton Miniature Railway Society	7 1/4 in (184 mm)	(United Kingdom) UK	Runcorn, Cheshire	
High Legh Railway	7 1/4 in (184 mm)	(United Kingdom) UK	High Legh Garden Centre, Cheshire	
Hollycombe Garden Railway	7 1/4 in (184 mm)	(United Kingdom) UK	Iron Hill, Liphook, Hampshire	
Ilford & West Essex Model Railway Club	7 1/4 in (184 mm)	(United Kingdom) UK	Chadwell Heath	
Leyland Society of Model Engineers	7 1/4 in (184 mm)	(United Kingdom) UK	Lancashire	
Little Orchard Railway	7 1/4 in (184 mm)	(United Kingdom) UK	Suffolk	
Little Western Railway	7 1/4 in (184 mm)	(United Kingdom) UK	Newquay, Cornwall	
Lodge Farm Park Miniature Railway	7 1/4 in (184 mm)	(United Kingdom) UK	Romford	
Mid Cheshire Society of Model Engineers	7 1/4 in (184 mm)	(United Kingdom) UK	Sandiway, Cheshire	
Fenn Bell Inn Zoo	7 1/4 in (184 mm)	UK	St. Mary Hoo, Kent	
Mizens Railway	7 1/4 in (184 mm)	(United Kingdom) UK	Woking, Surrey	
Moors Valley Railway	7 1/4 in (184 mm)	(United Kingdom) UK	Dorset	
Mortocombe Railway	7 1/4 in (184 mm)	(United Kingdom) UK	Chilton, Oxfordshire	
Museum of Power	7 1/4 in (184 mm)	(United Kingdom) UK	Langford, Essex	
National Railway Museum	7 1/4 in (184 mm)	(United Kingdom) UK	York	
Ness Islands Railway	7 1/4 in (184 mm)	(United Kingdom) UK	Inverness, Scotland	
North London Society of Model Engineers (NLSME)	7 1/4 in (184 mm)	(United Kingdom) UK		
Parkland Miniature Railway	7 1/4 in (184 mm)	(United Kingdom) UK	Hemsby, Norfolk	
Pinewood Miniature Railway	7 1/4 in (184 mm)	(United Kingdom) UK	Wokingham, Berkshire	Combined 7 1/4 in (184 mm) and 5 in (127 mm)
Plowman's Railroad	7 1/4 in (184 mm)	(United Kingdom) UK	Dorset	
Porterswick Junction Light Railway	7 1/4 in (184 mm)	(United Kingdom) UK	Hidden Valley Discovery Park, Cornwall	
Pugneys Light Railway	7 1/4 in (184 mm)	(United Kingdom) UK	Wakefield	
Ridgeway Park light railway	7 1/4 in (184 mm)	(United Kingdom) UK	Chingford, London	
Saltwood Miniature Railway	7 1/4 in (184 mm)	(United Kingdom) UK	Kent	
Sanday Light Railway	7 1/4 in (184 mm)	(United Kingdom) UK	Braeswick, Sanday, Orkney	
Spenborough Model & Experimental Engineers Ltd	7 1/4 in (184 mm)	(United Kingdom) UK	Cleckheaton, West Yorkshire	
Strand Miniature Railway	7 1/4 in (184 mm)	(United Kingdom) UK	Gillingham, Kent	
Swanley New Barn Railway	7 1/4 in (184 mm)	(United Kingdom) UK	Kent	
The Time Machine (Bosworth Line)	7 1/4 in (184 mm)	(United Kingdom) UK	Funtington, West Sussex po18-9dh	
Thornes Park Miniature Railway	7 1/4 in (184 mm)	(United Kingdom) UK	Wakefield, West Yorkshire	
South Weber Railroad Club	7 1/2 in (190.5 mm)	(United States) USA	South Weber, Utah, USA	
Thompson Park Railway	7 1/4 in (184 mm)	UK	Burnley	
Wellington Country Park Railway	7 1/4 in (184 mm)	(United Kingdom) UK	Berkshire	
Welsh Highland Heritage Miniature Railway	7 1/4 in (184 mm)	(United Kingdom) UK	Porthmadog, Wales	
Weston Park Railway	7 1/4 in (184 mm)	(United Kingdom) UK	Shropshire	
Willen Miniature Railway	7 1/4 in (184 mm)	(United Kingdom) UK	Milton Keynes	
Willow Wood Railway	7 1/4 in (184 mm)	(United Kingdom) UK	Stowupland, Suffolk	
Woodseaves Miniature Railway	7 1/4 in (184 mm)	(United Kingdom) UK	Shropshire	
Wolds Way Lavender Narrow Gauge Railway	7 1/4 in (184 mm)	(United Kingdom) UK	Wintringham, North Yorkshire	Used to transport harvested lavender, logs and passengers
Wythall miniature railway	7 1/4 in (184 mm)	(United Kingdom) UK	Worcestershire	It has a multigauge track consisting of 7 1/4 in (184 mm), 5 inch and 3 1/2 in (89 mm) gauge track.
Carolwood Pacific Railroad	7 1/4 in (184 mm)	(United States) US	Holmby Hills, Los Angeles, California	Located at the home of Walt Disney. Influenced the design of the Disneyland Railroad. Defunct.
Assiniboine Valley Railway	7 1/2 in (190.5 mm)	Canada	Winnipeg, Manitoba	
Burnaby Central Railway	7 1/2 in (190.5 mm)	Canada	Burnaby, British Columbia	
Vancouver Island Model Engineers	7 1/2 in (190.5 mm)	Canada	Saanichton, British Columbia	
West Coast Mini Rail	7 1/2 in (190.5 mm)	Canada	Squamish, British Columbia	Within the railway museum.
Iron Horse Park Airdrie	7 1/2 in (190.5 mm)	Canada	Airdrie, Alberta	
Paradise Valley Railway	7 1/2 in (190.5 mm)	Canada	Powell River, British Columbia	
Alaska Live Steamers	7 1/2 in (190.5 mm)	(United States) US	Wasilla, Alaska	
Annetta Valley & Western Railroad	7 1/2 in (190.5 mm)	(United States) US	Annetta, Texas	
Adobe Mountain Desert Park	7 1/2 in (190.5 mm)	(United States) US	Phoenix, Arizona	
Carillon Park Rail & Steam Society	7 1/2 in (190.5 mm)	(United States) US	Carillon Historical Park, Dayton, Ohio	
Central Pasco & Gulf Railroad	7 1/2 in (190.5 mm)	(United States) US	Crews Lake Wilderness Park, Shady Hills, Florida	
Colorado Live Steamers	7 1/2 in (190.5 mm)	(United States) US	Byers, Colorado	Primary gauge is 7 ½ in but also some 4 ¾ in on site
Grand Concourse Railroad	7 1/2 in (190.5 mm)	(United States) US	Shady Hills, Florida	
Great Lakes Live Steamers	7 1/2 in (190.5 mm)	(United States) US	Royal Oak and Southgate, Michigan	
Hesston Steam Museum	7 1/2 in (190.5 mm)	(United States) US	Hesston, Indiana	
Houston Area Live Steamers	7 1/2 in (190.5 mm)	(United States) US	Hockley, Texas	
Illinois Live Steamers	7 1/2 in (190.5 mm)	(United States) US	Chicago, Illinois	
Kitsap Live Steamers	7 1/2 in (190.5 mm)	(United States) US	Port Orchard, Washington	
Lakes Park & Gulf Railroad	7 1/2 in (190.5 mm)	(United States) US	Lakes Regional Park, Fort Myers, Florida	
Largo Central Railroad	7 1/2 in (190.5 mm)	(United States) US	Largo Central Park, Largo, Florida	
Los Angeles Live Steamers Railroad Museum	7 1/2 in (190.5 mm)	(United States) US	Los Angeles, California	
North Georgia Live Steamers	7 1/2 in (190.5 mm)	(United States) US	Conyers, Georgia	
Orange County Model Engineers	7 1/2 in (190.5 mm)	(United States) US	Costa Mesa, California	
Riverside Live Steamers	7 1/2 in (190.5 mm)	(United States) US	Riverside, California	
Sacramento Valley Live Steamers	7 1/2 in (190.5 mm)	(United States) US	Rancho Cordova, California	7 1/2 in (190.5 mm) gauge and 4 1/4 in (108 mm) gauge
Sagebrush Short Line Railroad	7 1/2 in (190.5 mm)	(United States) US	Ridgecrest, California	
Scottsdale Live Steamers	7 1/2 in (190.5 mm)	(United States) US	McCormick-Stillman Railroad Park, Scottsdale, Arizona	
Sandy Ridge & Clear Lake Railway	7 1/2 in (190.5 mm)	(United States) US	Battle Creek, Michigan	
Shady Dell Pacific	7 1/2 in (190.5 mm)	(United States) US	Pacific Northwest Live Steamers, Molalla, Oregon	
South Coast Railroad Museum	7 1/2 in (190.5 mm)	(United States) US	Goleta Short Line, Goleta, California	
Southern California Live Steamers	7 1/2 in (190.5 mm)	(United States) US	Wilson Park Torrance, California	Adjacent to Wilson Park
Torrey Pacific Railroad	7 1/2 in (190.5 mm)	(United States) US	Del Mar, California	Private/defunct; owner died
Tradewinds & Atlantic Railroad	7 1/2 in (190.5 mm)	(United States) US	Tradewinds Park, Coconut Creek, Florida	
Train Mountain Railroad	7 1/2 in (190.5 mm)	(United States) US	Chiloquin, Oregon	
Triad Live Steamers	7 1/2 in (190.5 mm)	(United States) US	Farmington and Harrisburg, North Carolina	
Wales West Light Railway	7 1/2 in (190.5 mm)	(United States) US	Silverhill, Alabama	
White Creek Railroad	7 1/2 in (190.5 mm)	(United States) US	Michigan	
Willow Creek Railroad	7 1/2 in (190.5 mm)	(United States) US	at Antique Powerland, Brooks, Oregon	
Holly Tree Railway	7 3/4 in (197 mm)	(United Kingdom) UK	at the Holly Tree PH, Leytonstone, London	
Bankside Miniature Railway	8 1/4 in (210 mm)	(United Kingdom) UK	Brambridge Park Garden Centre, Eastleigh, Hampshire	
Faversham Miniature Railway	9 in (229 mm)	(United Kingdom) UK	Brogdale Farm, near Faversham, Kent	
Torry Hill Park	9 in (229 mm)	(United Kingdom) UK	Near Frinsted, Kent	Private miniature railway
Becker Farm Railroad	9 7/16 in (240 mm)	(United States) US	Roseland, New Jersey	1938-1972; in storage 1973-1992
Becker Farm Railroad	9 7/16 in (240 mm)	(United States) US	Phillipsburg, New Jersey	1992-Present
Southernmost Southern Railroad	9 7/16 in (240 mm)	(United States) US	Key West, Florida	1965-1970
Key Western Railroad	9 7/16 in (240 mm)	(United States) US	Key West, Florida	1970-1986
Barking Park Miniature Railway	9 1/2 in (241 mm)	(United Kingdom) UK	Barking, Essex	Being relaid in 7 1/4 in (184 mm) gauge, scheduled to reopen Easter 2009
Clevedon Miniature Railway	9 1/2 in (241 mm)	UK	Clevedon, Somerset	1952–2013
Danson Park	9 1/2 in (241 mm)	(United Kingdom) UK	Bexleyheath, Kent	1942 (temporary line for Holidays at Home exhibition); 1949–1962
Downs Light Railway	9 1/2 in (241 mm)	(United Kingdom) UK	Colwall, Near Malvern, Worcestershire	
East Ham Miniature Railway	9 1/2 in (241 mm)	(United Kingdom) UK	East Ham, London	1945–1949
Hall Leys Park	9 1/2 in (241 mm)	(United Kingdom) UK	Matlock, Derbyshire	
Lakeshore Railroad	9 1/2 in (241 mm)	(United Kingdom) UK	South Marine Park, South Shields, Tyne & Wear	
Sidcup Miniature Railway	9 1/2 in (241 mm)	(United Kingdom) UK	Sidcup, Kent	1945–1951
Fenglin Miniature Railway	254 mm	China	Yingde, Guangdong	
Ferrocarril Piedra Baya	10 1/4 in (260 mm)	Argentina	Province of San Luis	
Ferrocarril Económico Sud	10 1/4 in (260 mm)	Argentina	Province of Buenos Aires	
Highfields Pioneer Village Miniature Railway	10 1/4 in (260 mm)	Australia	Highfields, QLD, 4352.	
Palmerston North Esplanade Scenic Railway Inc	10 1/4 in (260 mm)	New Zealand	Palmerston North, Manawatu	
Masterton Miniature Train Society	10 1/4 in (260 mm)	New Zealand	Queen Elizabeth Park, Masterton; Wairarapa	
Audley End Railway	10 1/4 in (260 mm)	(United Kingdom) UK	Audley End, Saffron Walden, Essex	
Ayton Castle	10 1/4 in (260 mm)	(United Kingdom) UK	Ayton, Scottish Borders, Scotland	Opened 2021
Beale Park	10 1/4 in (260 mm)	(United Kingdom) UK	Pangbourne, Berkshire	
Berkeley Light Railway	10 1/4 in (260 mm)	(United Kingdom) UK	Gloucestershire	
Bickington Steam Railway	10 1/4 in (260 mm)	(United Kingdom) UK	Trago Mills, Liverton, Newton Abbot, Devon	
Brechin Castle Centre Railway	10 1/4 in (260 mm)	(United Kingdom) UK	Haughmuir, Brechin, Scotland	Defunct
Bressingham Garden Railway	10 1/4 in (260 mm)	(United Kingdom) UK	Norfolk	
Brooklands Miniature Railway	10 1/4 in (260 mm)	(United Kingdom) UK	Brooklands Pleasure Park, Worthing, Sussex	Closed September 2018
Watford Miniature Railway	10 1/4 in (260 mm)	(United Kingdom) UK	Cassiobury Park, Watford, Hertfordshire	
Chichester & District Society of Model Engineers	10 1/4 in (260 mm)	(United Kingdom) UK	Chichester, Sussex	
Drayton Manor Miniature Railway	10 1/4 in (260 mm)	(United Kingdom) UK	Drayton Manor Theme Park, Staffordshire	Closed
Eastleigh Lakeside Railway	10 1/4 in (260 mm)	(United Kingdom) UK	Hampshire	
Melton Mowbray Miniature Railway	10 1/4 in (260 mm)	(United Kingdom) UK	Wilton Park, Melton Mowbray, Leicestershire	
Exmouth Express	10 1/4 in (260 mm)	(United Kingdom) UK	Exmouth, Devon	
Ferry Meadows Miniature Railway	10 1/4 in (260 mm)	(United Kingdom) UK	Nene Park, Peterborough, Cambridgeshire	
Happy Mount Park	10 1/4 in (260 mm)	(United Kingdom) UK	Bare, Morecambe, Lancashire	
Hastings Miniature Railway	10 1/4 in (260 mm)	(United Kingdom) UK	Hastings, Sussex	
Isle of Mull Railway	10 1/4 in (260 mm)	(United Kingdom) UK	Mull, Scotland	
Kerr's Miniature Railway	10 1/4 in (260 mm)	(United Kingdom) UK	West Links Park, Arbroath, Scotland	1935–2020.
Kirkby Green Light Railway	10 1/4 in (260 mm)	(United Kingdom) UK	Sleaford, Lincolnshire	Private with open days
Knebworth Park Miniature Railway	10 1/4 in (260 mm)	(United Kingdom) UK	Hertfordshire	
Ropley Miniature Railway	10 1/4 in (260 mm)	(United Kingdom) UK	Mid-Hants Railway, Hampshire	Opened 2015
Manor Railway	10 1/4 in (260 mm)	(United Kingdom) UK	Ingfield Manor, Billingshurst, Sussex	
Mortocombe Railway	10 1/4 in (260 mm)	(United Kingdom) UK	Chilton, Oxfordshire	
Newby Hall Miniature Railway North Yorkshire	10 1/4 in (260 mm)	(United Kingdom) UK		
Paignton Zoo	10 1/4 in (260 mm)	(United Kingdom) UK	Paignton, Devon	1940–2021.
Paradise Wildlife Park	10 1/4 in (260 mm)	(United Kingdom) UK	Broxbourne, Hertfordshire	
Pettit's Animal Adventure Park	10 1/4 in (260 mm)	(United Kingdom) UK	Reedham, Norfolk	
Poole Park Railway	10 1/4 in (260 mm)	(United Kingdom) UK	Poole Park, Poole, Dorset	1949–2016, reopened 2017
Radwell Manor Railway	10 1/4 in (260 mm)	(United Kingdom) UK	Radwell, Bedfordshire	Closed
Rio Grande Miniature Railway	10 1/4 in (260 mm)	(United Kingdom) UK	Selby Road, Garforth, Leeds, UK	
Royal Victoria Railway	10 1/4 in (260 mm)	(United Kingdom) UK	Royal Victoria Country Park, Netley, Southampton, Hampshire	
Rudyard Lake Steam Railway	10 1/4 in (260 mm)	(United Kingdom) UK	Rudyard, near Leek, Staffordshire	
Smokey Oak Railway	10 1/4 in (260 mm)	(United Kingdom) UK	Woodland Park, Brokerswood, Westbury, Wiltshire	
South Downs Light Railway	10 1/4 in (260 mm)	(United Kingdom) UK	Pulborough, Sussex	
Southsea Miniature Railway	10 1/4 in (260 mm)	(United Kingdom) UK	Southsea, Hampshire	Closed 1989
St. Anne's Miniature Railway	10 1/4 in (260 mm)	(United Kingdom) UK	St. Annes-on-Sea, Lancashire	
Stapleford Miniature Railway	10 1/4 in (260 mm)	(United Kingdom) UK	Stapleford Park, Leicestershire	Private but opens mid-June and August each year
Sutton Hall Railway	10 1/4 in (260 mm)	(United Kingdom) UK	Rochford, Essex	
Vanstone Woodland Railway	10 1/4 in (260 mm)	(United Kingdom) UK	Vanstone Park Garden Centre, Codicote, Hertfordshire	
Wat Tyler Miniature Railway	10 1/4 in (260 mm)	(United Kingdom) UK	Wat Tyler Country Park, Pitsea, Basildon	
Wells and Walsingham Light Railway	10 1/4 in (260 mm)	(United Kingdom) UK		Smallest gauge used on a minimum gauge railway authorised by a Light Railway Order.
Weymouth Bay Miniature Railway	10 1/4 in (260 mm)	(United Kingdom) UK	Lodmoor, Weymouth, Dorset	
Wells Harbour Railway	10 1/4 in (260 mm)	(United Kingdom) UK	Wells-next-the-Sea, Norfolk	Closed September 2021,
Wenatchee Riverfront Railway	10 1/4 in (260 mm)	(United States) US	Wenatchee, Washington	
Ruislip Lido Railway	12 in (305 mm)	(United Kingdom) UK	Greater London	
Argyle & Eastern Railroad at The Toy Train Barn	12 in (305 mm)	(United States) US	Argyle, Wisconsin	
Atchison & Western Railroad	12 in (305 mm)	(United States) US	Atchison Rail Museum, Atchison, Kansas	
C&H Railroad	12 in (305 mm)	(United States) US	Tecumseh, Kansas	
Casey's Silver Streak at Estes Park Ride-A-Kart	12 in (305 mm)	(United States) US	Estes Park, Colorado	
Central Park (San Mateo) Mini Train	12 in (305 mm)	(United States) US	San Mateo, California	
Emerald Hills Railway	12 in (305 mm)	(United States) US	Emerald Hills, California	
Fairview Line at Fair Oaks	12 in (305 mm)	(United States) US	Gadsden, Alabama	Private
Folsom Valley Railway	12 in (305 mm)	(United States) US	Folsom, California	
Little Falls Railroad and Doll Museum	12 in (305 mm)	(United States) US	Sparta, Wisconsin	Private
Midway Shortline Railroad	12 in (305 mm)	(United States) US	S & S Shortline Railroad Park and Museum, Farmington, Utah	
Northview and Frisco Railroad	12 in (305 mm)	(United States) US	Northview, Missouri	Private
Rails of Fun	12 in (305 mm)	(United States) US	St. Louis, Missouri	Portable amusement business for events
Rothwell Park Railroad	12 in (305 mm)	(United States) US	Moberly, Missouri	Club/members only
Poco Loco Railroad	12 in (305 mm)	(United States) US	LaPorte, Indiana	
Sierra Rainier Railroad	12 in (305 mm)	(United States) US	Orting, Washington	Defunct/closed. Private. Very few records exist.
Sonora Short Line Railway	12 in (305 mm)	(United States) US	Tuolumne, California	Defunct/closed. Private. Very few records exist.
Wabash Frisco & Pacific Railway	12 in (305 mm)	(United States) US	Missouri	
Washington Stage Theater	12 in (305 mm)	(United States) US	La Porte, Indiana	Private
Watson Steam Train & Depot	12 in (305 mm)	(United States) US	Missouri Valley, IA	
Zilker Zephyr	12 in (305 mm)	(United States) US	Zilker Park, Austin, Texas	Damaged by storms and without a current operator; subject of lawsuits
Exbury Gardens Steam Railway	12 1/4 in (311 mm)	(United Kingdom) UK	Beaulieu, Hampshire	
Exmoor Steam Railway	12 1/4 in (311 mm)	(United Kingdom) UK	Bratton Fleming, Devon	Closed to the public in 2001
Fairbourne Railway	12 1/4 in (311 mm)	(United Kingdom) UK	Gwynedd, Wales	Originally 15 in gauge
Hotham Park Miniature Railway	12 1/4 in (311 mm)	(United Kingdom) UK	Bognor Regis, West Sussex	
Littlehampton Miniature Railway	12 1/4 in (311 mm)	(United Kingdom) UK	Littlehampton, West Sussex	
Newchapel, Horne & Burstow Grand Junction Railway	12 1/4 in (311 mm)	(United Kingdom) UK	Horne, Horley, Surrey	
Mease Valley Light Railway	12 1/4 in (311 mm)	(United Kingdom) UK	Tamworth, Staffordshire	Opened in 2023 at the Statfold Barn Railway.
Midland Beach Railway Company	12 5/8 in (321 mm)	(United States) US	Midland Beach, Staten Island, New York	Defunct
Zoo Train, DierenPark Amersfoort	13 3/8 in (340 mm)	Netherlands		
Adventure City Express Train	14 in (356 mm)	(United States) US	Adventure City, Anaheim, California	
Hesston Steam Museum	14 in (356 mm)	(United States) US	Hesston, Indiana	
Kiddieland Limited	14 in (356 mm)	(United States) US	Kiddieland Amusement Park, Melrose Park, Illinois	Defunct
Riverside Express	14 in (356 mm)	(United States) US	Castle Park, Riverside, California	
Pine Valley Miniature Railway	Mixed Gauge: 2^{1}/_{2} in (64 mm); 3^{1}/_{2} in (89 mm); 5 in (127 mm); 7 1/4 in (184 mm)	Australia	Warner, Queensland	
Model Park Denmark	7 1/4 in (184 mm)	Denmark	Modelparken Danmark, Viby J, Egå	
Brandhøjbanen^{dk}, at Hedeland veteran railway^{dk}	Mixed Gauge: 5 in (127 mm); 5^{1}/_{32}(145 mm); 7 1/4 in (184 mm)	Denmark	Hedeland veteran railway, Hedehusene, Høje-Taastrup	, there are also one at Denmark's railway museum in Odense and one at the Tramway Museum Skjoldenæsholm and many other model-miniature railways in Denmark and Model lane Europe and many others.
Ascot Locomotive Society	Mixed Gauge: 2^{1}/_{2} in (64 mm); 3^{1}/_{2} in (89 mm); 5 in (127 mm); 7 1/4 in (184 mm)	(United Kingdom) UK	Ascot, Berkshire	Large track layout with working turntable adjacent to Ascot Racecourse
Descanso Railroad	7 1/2 in (190.5 mm)	(United States) US	La Cañada Flintridge, California	

=== Gallery ===
Ridable miniature railways

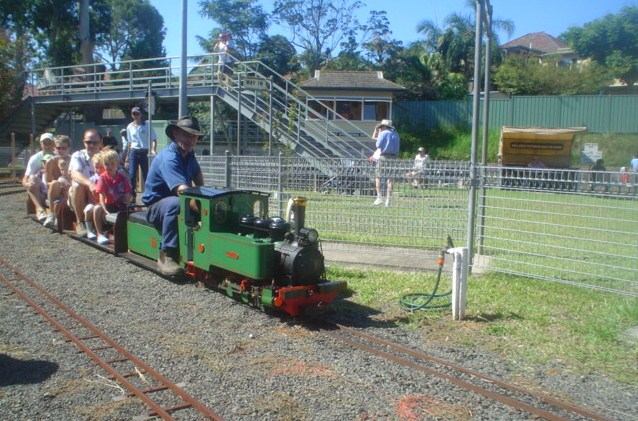
Miniature railway ride in West Ryde, Australia in 2007

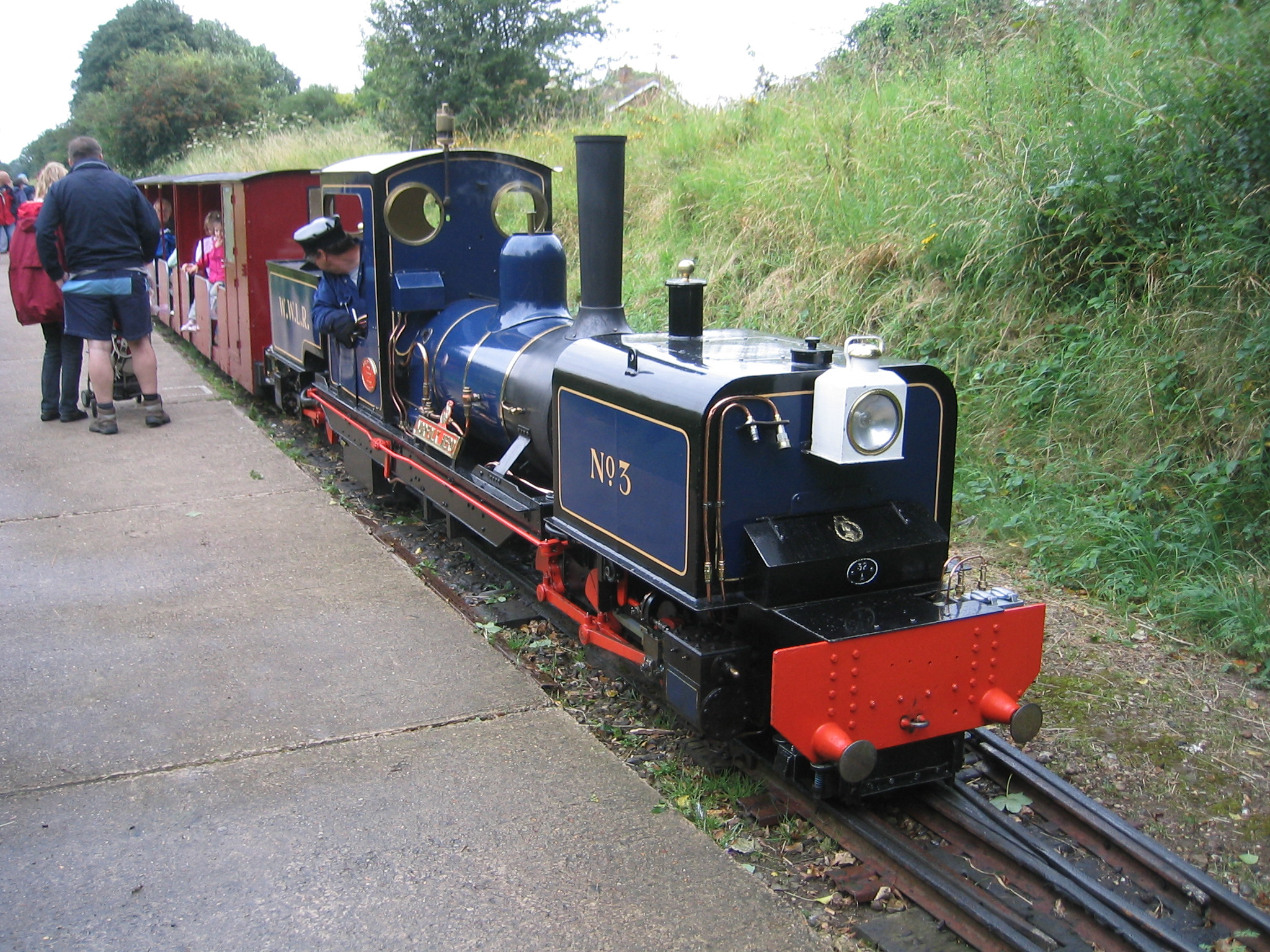
Wells and Walsingham Light Railway

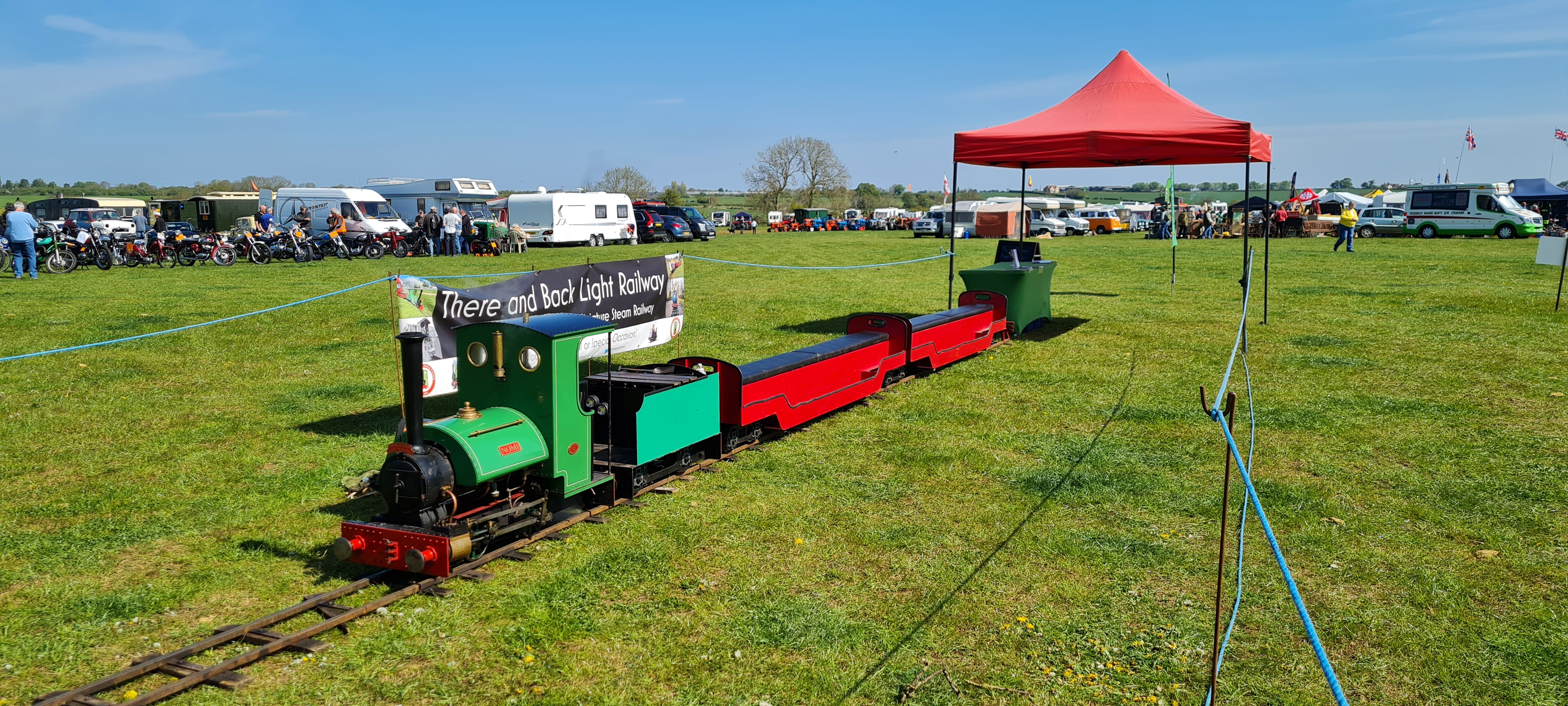
There and Back Light Railway at Rushden

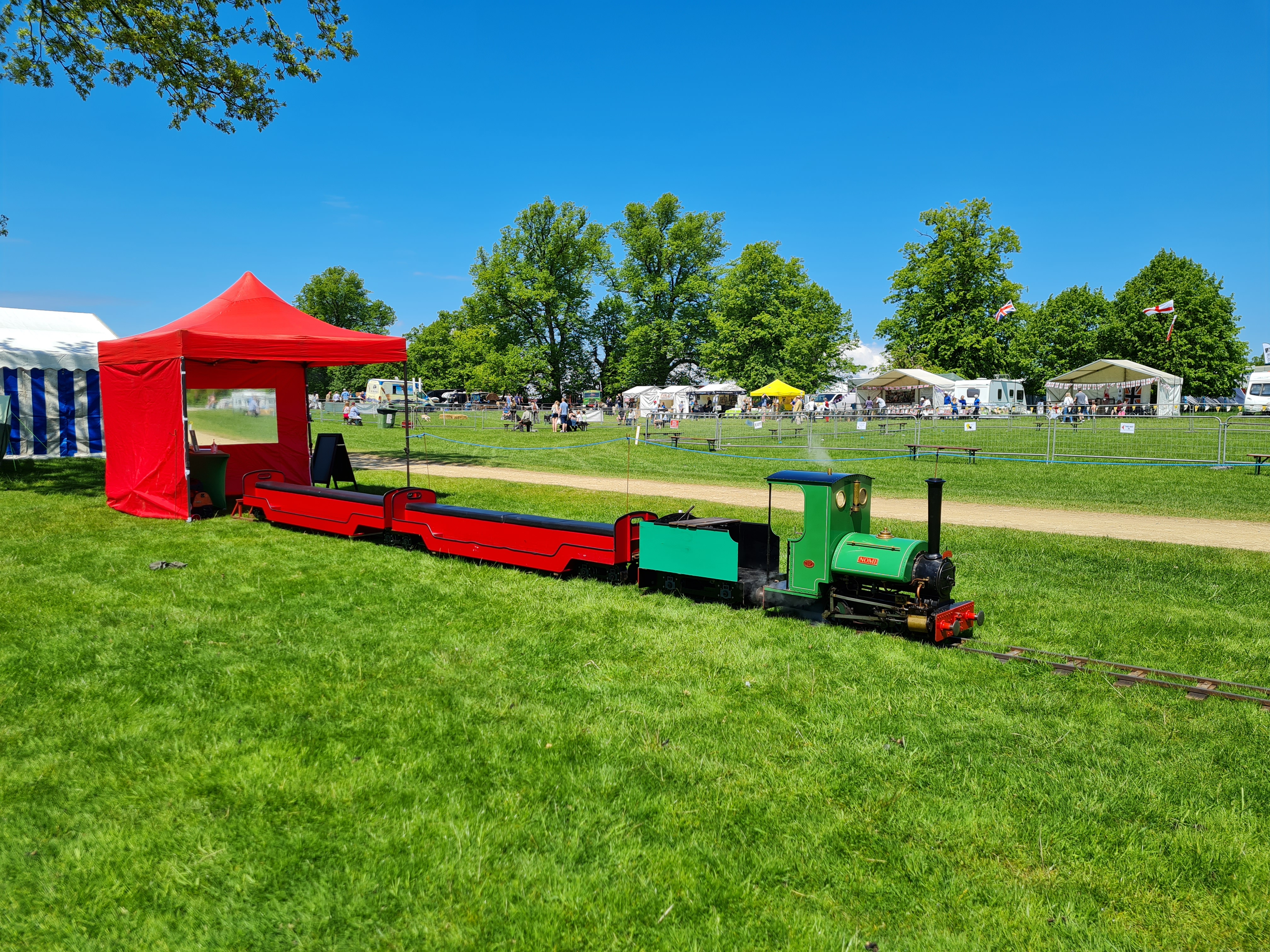
There and Back Light Railway at Burghley

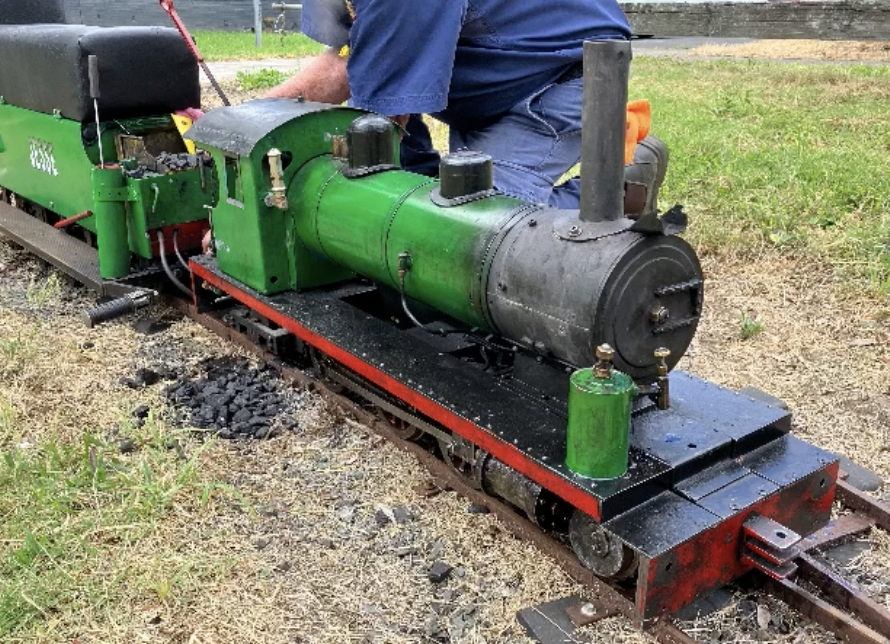
Miniature train in Bankstown, NSW

== See also ==
- Backyard railroad
- British narrow-gauge railways
- Children's railway
- Decauville
- Rail transport modelling scales
- Train ride

== Bibliography ==
- Broggie, Michael (2014), Walt Disney's Railroad Story: The Small-Scale Fascination That Led to a Full-Scale Kingdom (4th ed.), The Donning Company Publishers, ISBN 978-1-57864-914-3
