= Midland Beach Railway Company =

Coordinates: 40.569124°N 74.087315°W

Midland Beach Railway
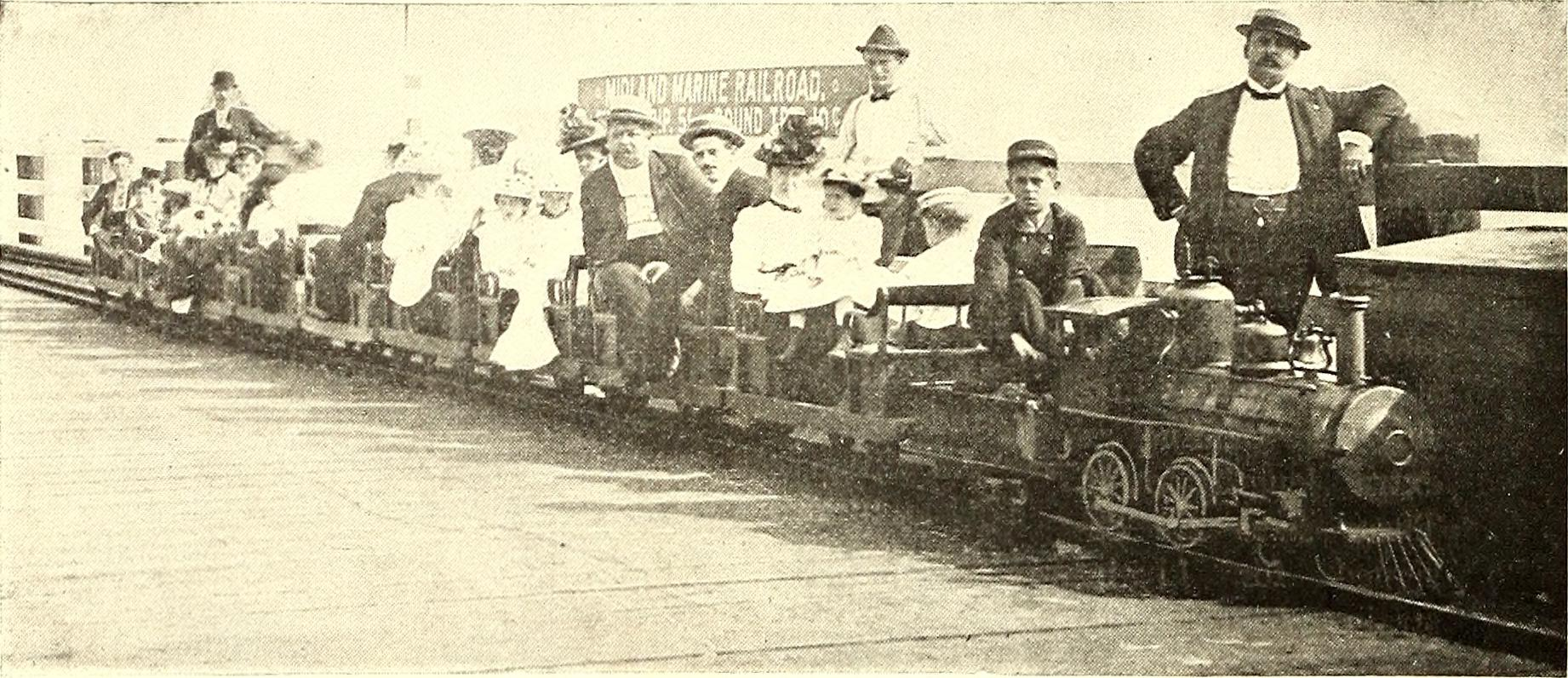
- Miniature train for the Midland Beach Pier

Technical
- Line length: 1,800 feet (549 m)
- Track gauge: 12 5/8 in (321 mm)

The Midland Beach Railway Company was the operator of a miniature railway at Midland Beach in Staten Island, New York City around 1903. The railroad operated along a pier jutting out from what is now the South Beach Boardwalk.

== Operation ==
The track was laid on the pier at Midland Beach, which was 1,800 feet (549 m) in length, and its steam locomotive was designed to draw a train of nine cars. The gauge of the locomotive was a unique 12 5/8 in (321 mm), and it was built like a standard trunk line steam locomotive in every particular. Its length was 5 feet 4 inches (1,626 mm), its width 18 inches (457 mm), and its height 28 inches (711 mm) from the rail to the top of the smokestack. The passenger cars were 5 feet (1,524 mm) long and 22 inches (559 mm) wide, and the train ran on a track laid with 8 pounds per yard (3.97 kg/m) T-rails.

== Locomotive ==
The lilliputian locomotive was made by the Miniature Railway Company of New York. Their devices have proved profitable at street railway parks as well as at some of the fairs, like the Pan-American Exposition, at Buffalo, New York, and those at Omaha, Philadelphia and Charleston in the early 1900s. Some of the street railway parks at which these machines have been run in 1902 were those of the Oil City Railway Company, Oil City, Pennsylvania; the West Chicago Street Railway Company and the Richmond Beach Railway Company.
