= Caldecotte Miniature Railway =

Miniature railway in Buckinghamshire, England

Coordinates: 52.0105°N 0.7087°W

Commercial operations
- Name: Caldecotte Miniature Railway
- Built by: Milton Keynes Model Engineering Society
- Original gauge: 7 1/4 in (184 mm) 5 in (127 mm) 3 1/2 in (89 mm)

Preserved operations
- Stations: One, 'Caldecotte'.
- Length: 860 yards (786 m)

Commercial history
- Opened: 2005

Caldecotte Miniature Railway (CMR) is a 3.5, 5 and 7.25 inch miniature railway run by the Milton Keynes Model Engineering Society (MKMES) located in Milton Keynes, Buckinghamshire. It is one of the few miniature railways in the UK which offers rides for passengers who are wheelchair users, with a specially built coach.

The railway runs every Sunday between the start of April and the end of October. Steam is often used to provide rides.

== History ==
Opened in 2005 by the MKMES, a small 'out and back' track was laid, which raised funds for the railway to construct their permanent raised level, dual gauge 3.5 / 5 inch track which was then subsequently used as the railways main track for providing rides. Construction started a few years later on a ground level dual gauge 5 / 7.25 inch track, which was completed in 2012, with locomotive Hagrid completing the first circuit on 25 March, before the railway was officially opened by the then mayor of Milton Keynes, Catriona Morris, on 1 April, with Gas fired steam locomotive 'Nutty' hauling the first passenger train. The opening of the 7.25 track allowed the society's larger locomotives, which had been in store for 5 years, to be used on passenger trains once again.

== The railway ==
The 7.25 railway is an oval which is 840 feet in length (making a ride 1680 feet). The station, which is accessed via a crossing, features a turntable, sidings and two platforms which trains can arrive or depart from. Immediately leaving the station, the main yard can be seen on the right, which has multiple steaming bays and sidings, as well as the main engine sheds. Another notable feature of the railway is the Blue 'Truss' bridge which spans a drainage gap for the field. The bridge was constructed to carry the raised level track but was later widened to allow the ground level trains to use it too.

== Locomotives used ==
Trains are often hauled by a variety of visiting members locos, with the 'home' locomotives being Hagrid and Katie, which are both petrol powered, Matilda, a battery electric engine, and steam locomotives Sylvia, Pollyanna and Ivy K all being Romulus design engines.

| Locomotive name | Locomotive type | Design name |
|---|---|---|
| Hagrid | Petrol | Freelance design |
| Katie | Petrol | Freelance design |
| Esmerelda | Petrol | British Rail Class 23 |
| Sylvia | Steam | Romulus |
| Pollyanna | Steam | Romulus |
| Ivy K | Steam | Romulus |
| Holmside | Steam | Holmside |
| 475 | Steam | Rio grande |
| Matilda | Battery electric | Freelance design |
| | Battery electric | British Rail Class 35 |

== Regular events ==
The railway holds a number of regular events throughout the year, notable events being their traction engine rally and charity day, both being held in the summer months. The railway also holds Halloween trains at the end of October and Santa trains in mid- December.
