= Wenatchee Riverfront Railway =

The Wenatchee Riverfront Railway is a 10 in (254 mm) gauge miniature railway located in Wenatchee, Washington.
