= Becker Farm Railroad =

Miniature railway

Coordinates: 40.68759°N 75.19421°W

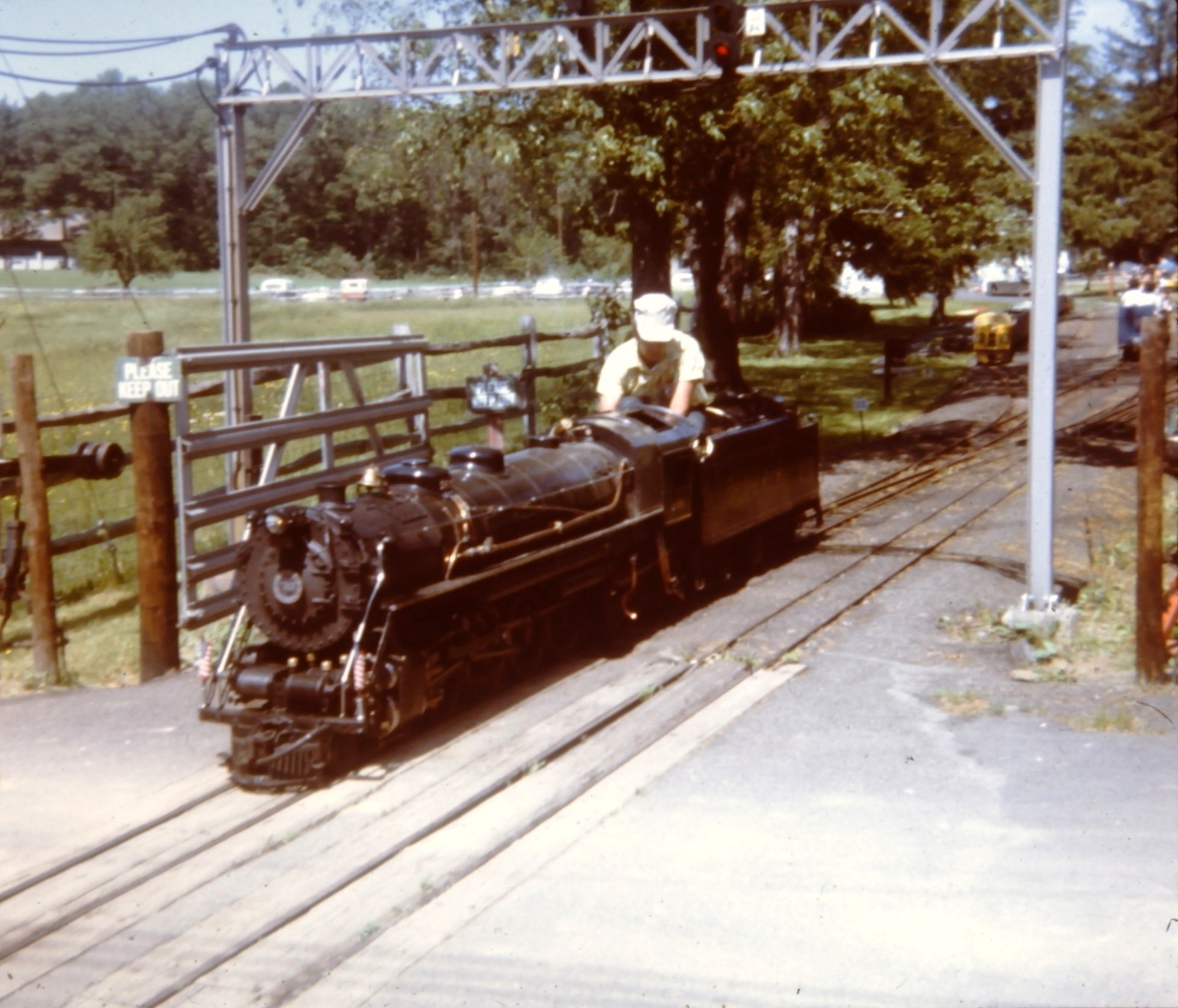
Engine #1501, a 4-8-4 live steam locomotive in 1972, the final year of operation for the Centerville & Southwestern Railroad. The engine has just been turned on the turntable (out of view on right) and has paused under the signal bridge near Centerville Station. The grade crossing runs between the ticket booth (adjacent to turntable, also out of view to the right) and Centerville Station (out of view to left). The engine is about to reverse direction and back up to couple with the train that is waiting with passengers in the train yard. The train will then proceed forward into the station to disembark its passengers and to await its next run to Paradise Valley. The railroad's roundhouse is located at the far end of the railyard.

The Becker Farm Railroad (also known as the Centerville and Southwestern Railroad) was located on the Becker dairy farm in Roseland, New Jersey, US. This 2-inch scale, 9 7/16 in (240 mm) gauge miniature railway, which featured a live steam locomotive, small-scale diesel locomotives, and small-scale passenger cars, was the brainchild of Eugene Becker. The railroad dated back to 1938, with the first revenue trips taking place ten years later.

The railroad was modeled after the Delaware, Lackawanna and Western Railroad's Sussex Branch, on which Becker had a creamery at Straders, New Jersey, near the end of the line at Branchville, NJ (about 35 miles (56 km) away from Roseland as the crow flies). After World War II, the C&S RR was extended to Peachtree Jct., approximately one mile from Centerville Station. Peachtree Jct. was not initially built as a continuous track, but rather as a wye track (Y-shaped configuration) that allowed the engine to be moved from the front to the rear of the train for the return trip. By 1949, the track had been extended to the edge of the Becker property in a 2,000-foot (610 m) loop that eliminated the need for using the wye track. A total of 7,000 feet (2,100 m) of track had been laid.

== Operations ==
At full operation, the railroad ran on Saturdays until 5 pm between the beginning of May and the end of October, including Memorial Day, the Fourth of July, and Labor Day. It also operated on Wednesdays during July and August until dusk. It provided a two-mile (3 km) round-trip ride between Centerville and Peachtree Jct. Originally, a round-trip ticket cost 20 cents for children and 40 cents for adults (later raised to 24 and 48 cents, respectively, during the early 1960s, and to 25 and 50 cents, respectively, by the late 1960s). Typically, #1501, a 4-8-4 live steam locomotive, would pull a train on the hour (10 am, 11 am, noon, etc.) and #1502 or #1503 (miniature diesel locomotives) would run on the half-hour (10:30 am, 11:30 am, etc.). Six to eight passengers could ride per car, and trains usually ran with 8-10 cars. On rare occasions, if ridership warranted, #1500 (a smaller 0-4-0 diesel engine) would be called to run as an "extra" with a shorter consist of cars (usually no more than four cars) on the quarter-hour.

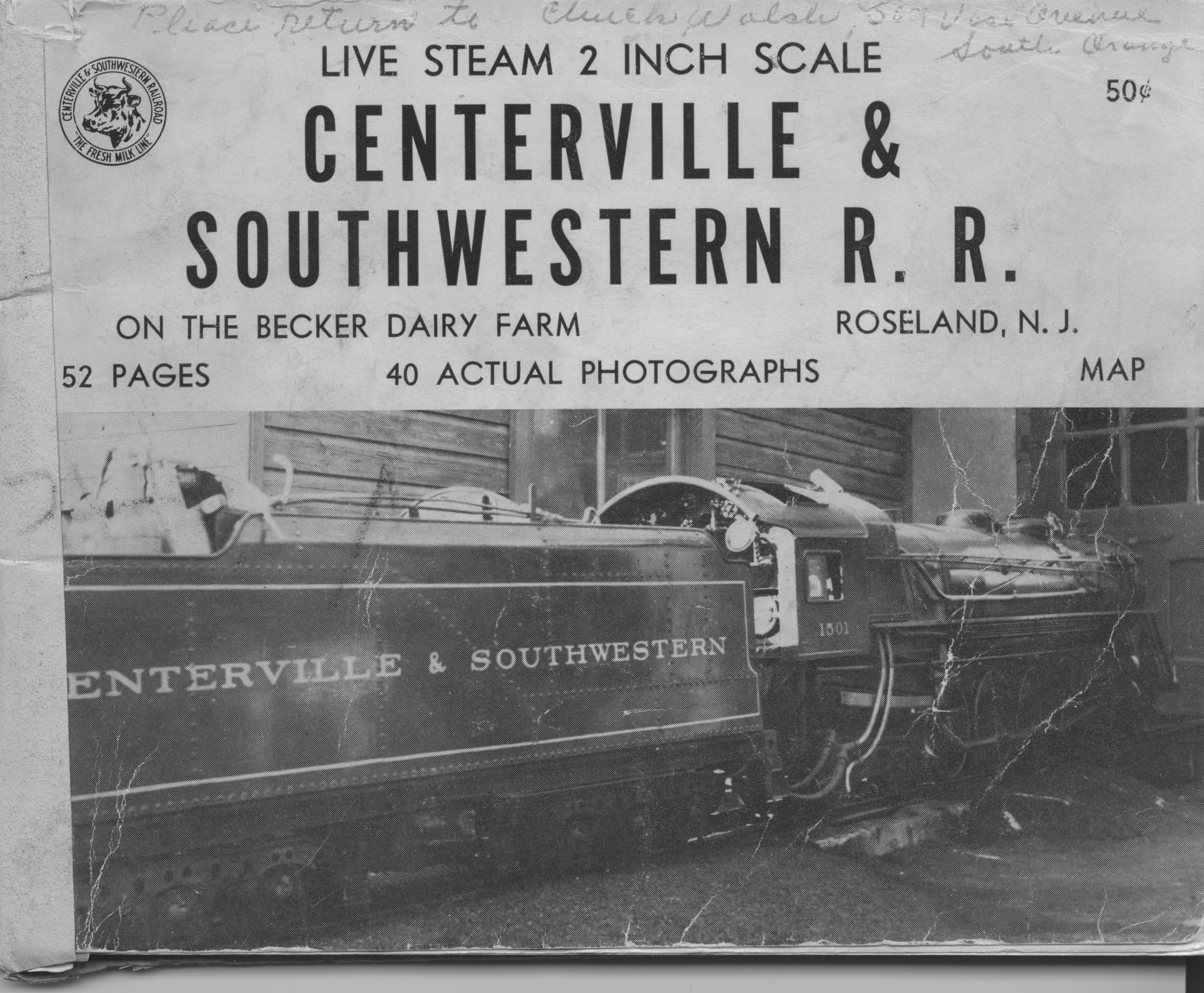
Cover of the Centerville & Southwestern Railroad brochure published in 1955. The 52-page brochure, with C&S live steam engine #1501 on the front cover, described the railroad in its heyday during the 1950s.

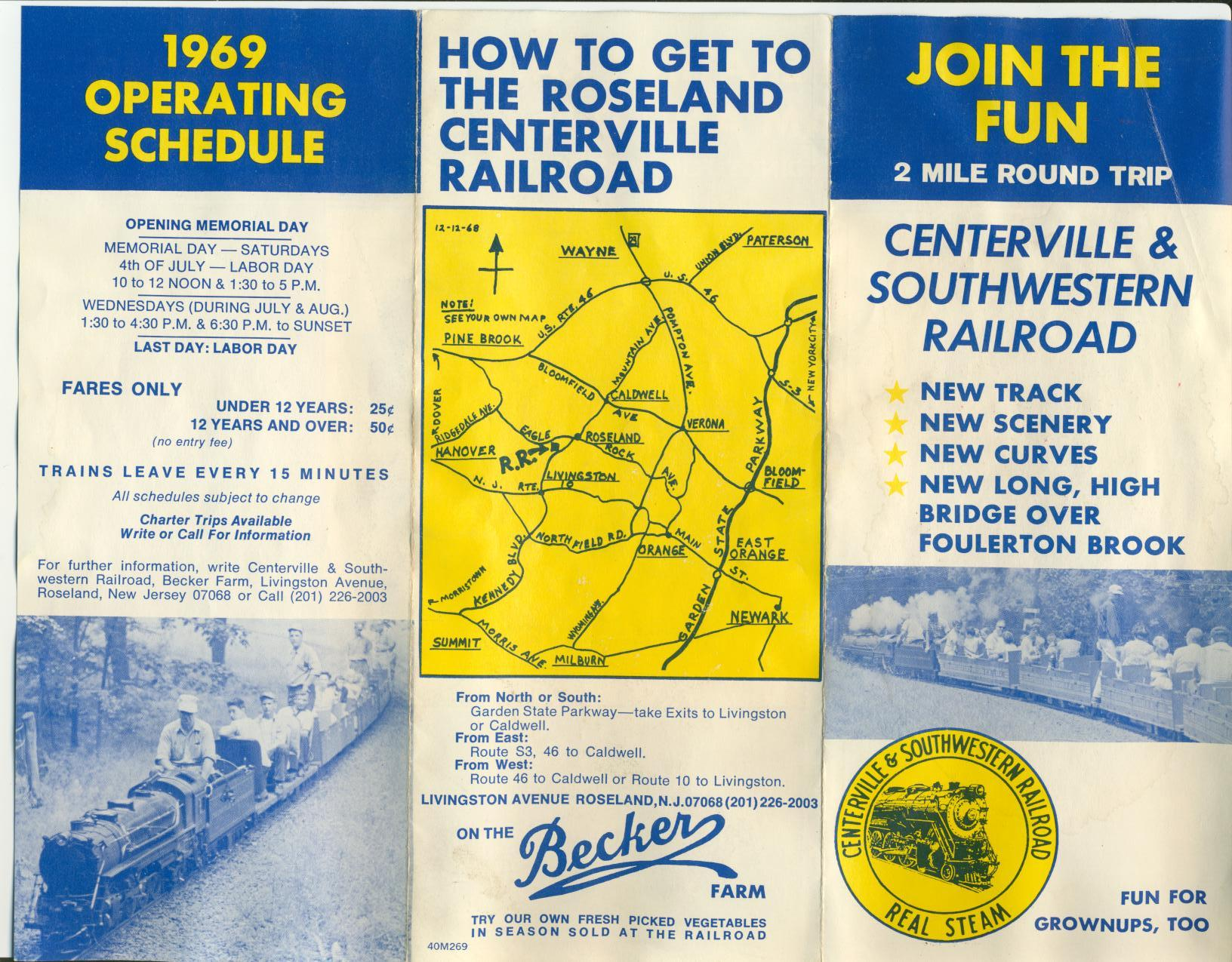
The Centerville & Southwestern Railroad brochure for the 1969 season. This was the first year of operations over the new line to Paradise Valley over the Foulerton Brook high bridge. (See reverse side of brochure for a map of the railroad.) Although the railroad has been gone almost 40 years, the high bridge still survives today, shown in a 1990 photo below.

As such, trains would originate in Centerville yard and be pulled across the grade crossing (where the ticket booth was located) and into Centerville station where loading would take place. (Only the first runs in the morning would pull into the station empty since trains coming back from Peachtree Jct. would first pass through the station and into Centerville Yard so that the engine could be placed on the opposite end of the train).

On signal from the conductor, the engineer (who was typically dressed as an engineer) would blow the horn or whistle and then start the train out of the station. Since the train station was located at the bottom of a sizeable hill (3½% grade), the train would need to accelerate as quickly as possible before it crossed the short trestle over Foulerton Brook and then across a second grade crossing. From there, the track continued to climb on what was called Pigpen Grade (named after the pigpen on the righthand side of the tracks) until it reached the crest of the hill, the meeting point for outgoing and incoming trains: Pigpen Siding.

The next landmark on the railroad past Pigpen Siding was Horseshoe Curve, a sharp curve in the shape of a horseshoe near the adjacent treeline, which was fashioned after the Pennsylvania Railroad's Horseshoe Curve near Altoona, Pennsylvania, and which restricted trains to 8 mph (13 km/h). After leaving Horseshoe Curve, a second, lesser-used, siding was encountered, after which the line curved to the right and the Long Fill (about a five-foot (1.5 m) fill) where the best speed on the railroad could be made. (Although trains were restricted in revenue service to 12 mph (19 km/h), locomotive #1500, ironically the least powerful locomotive on the railroad's roster, was known to have attained in excess of 40 mph (64 km/h) on numerous occasions. However, the lack of a long straight (tangent) track, and the risk of turning over a rail, were concerns that limited "high speed" running on the C&S RR.)

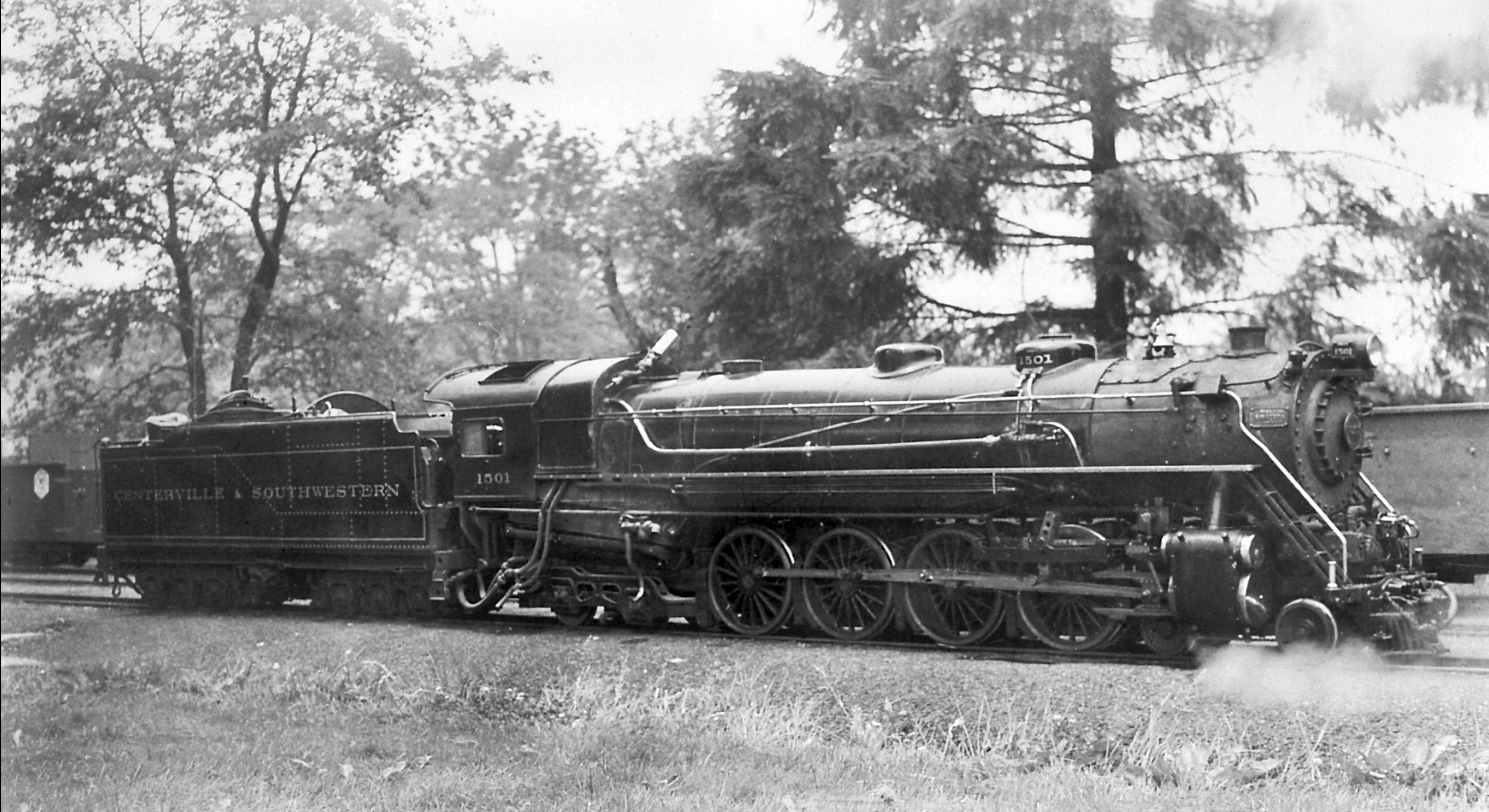
C&SRR Engine #1501, under steam, in the Centerville rail yard during the 1950s.

At the end of the Long Fill, the track entered a rock cut and then passed into the woods and approached Peachtree Jct. Although the diesel locomotives would operate without having to refuel, steam locomotive #1501 was required to stop to add coal to the fire as well as water to the boiler. This was done on the loop track. Due to the construction of #1501, this stop was necessary, and could not be performed while the train was in motion.

On the return trip to Centerville, trains usually stopped and sat "in the hole" at Pigpen Siding to allow the next train to pass. On rare occasions, when only one engine was running, the train would pass through the siding without stopping. When returning to Centerville, the train would pass through the station and into Centerville yard, where the engine would be run around the train (if it were a diesel) or be backed into the turntable for turning (if it were #1501) and then would be coupled back to the other end of the train. (Number 1502 was the only engine that didn't require turning since it had engineer controls on both ends. Number 1500, although a diesel, had only one set of controls and would also need to be turned on the turntable.) The train would then reverse direction back to the station where passengers would wait for the conductor to unlatch their car door so that they could leave the train.

== Locomotives ==
Over its 44-year lifetime, the Centerville & Southwestern had a total of four operating locomotives on its roster, although for much of its lifetime the railroad never had more than three locomotives simultaneously on the property.

=== Engine #1500 ===
Built from a motorcycle engine in 1938, this was the first locomotive to ply the rails in Roseland. A 1940 photo shows 1500 as an odd-looking shell of an engine with open seats and several long levers (brakes and throttle). Subsequently, rebuilt twice, the small, bright-red, single-cab, gas-powered engine that emerged was generally used as a back-up for the other engines. The engine was conveyed to a miniature railroad in Florida, the Key Western Railroad, in 1965.

=== Engine #1501 ===
The railroad's most famous locomotive was built in 1950. A 4-8-4 Northern-type steam locomotive based on the Delaware, Lackawanna & Western Q-1 class, #1501-1505, known as the "Poconos" on the DL&W. It currently is on display in Howell, Michigan.

=== Engine #1502 ===
This was the railroad's first true diesel locomotive. Built as a dual-cab (bidirectional) engine, this was the only locomotive on the roster that didn't require turning on the turntable.

=== Engine #1503 ===
The last locomotive to be added to the roster, 1503 is a single-cab engine.

== A favorite with kids of all ages ==
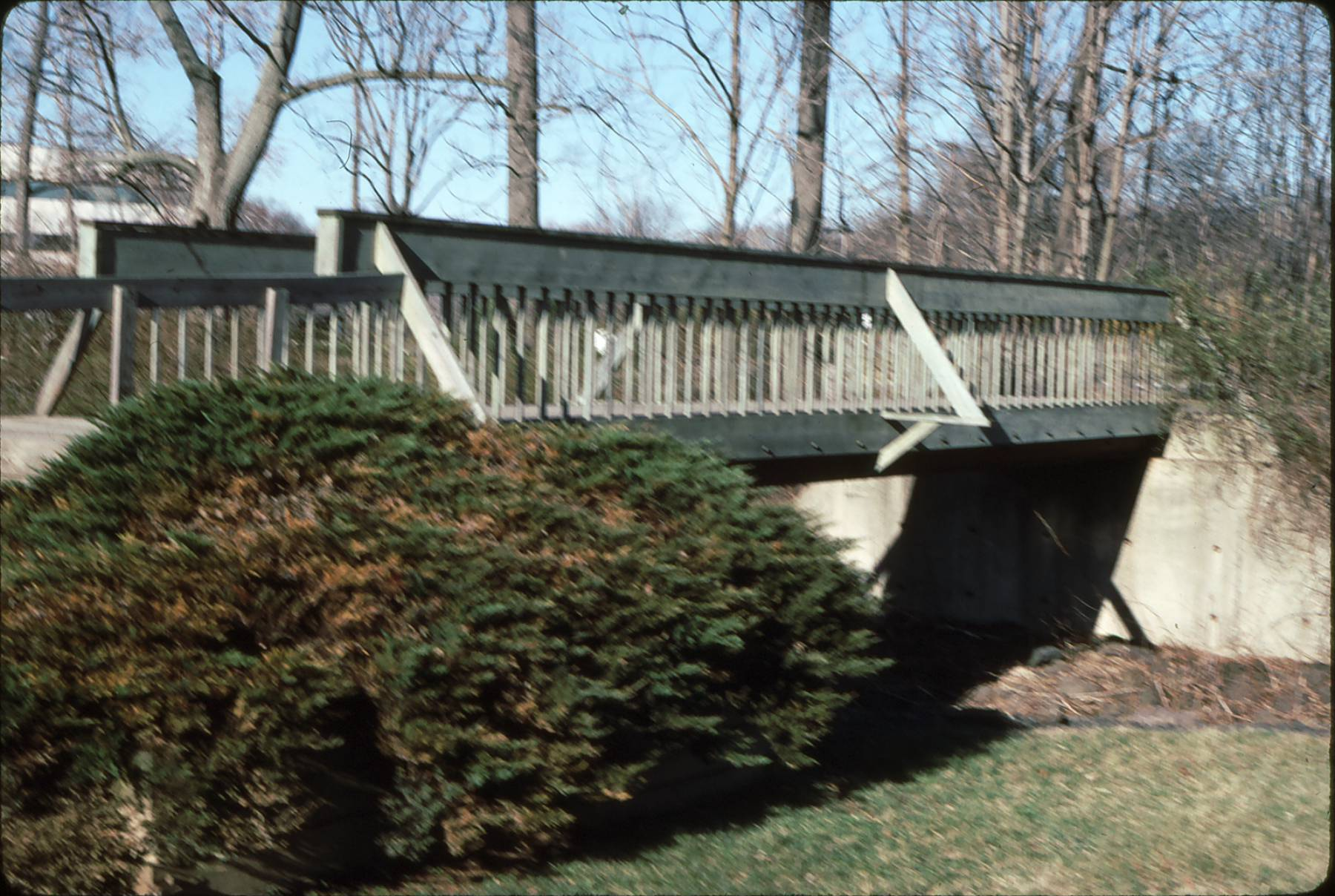
This 1990 photo shows the C&S's "high bridge", built in 1968 as part of the realignment of the railroad due to I-280's encroachment at Peachtree Junction. It's probably safe to assume that most of the workers at the Becker Farm Road business campus have no idea that the bridge they are crossing once carried a miniature railroad. Note the concrete bridge abutment.

Although the C&S was a miniature railroad, it was operated as if it were a real railroad. Becker, who was very much a railfan and live-steam enthusiast, went to great lengths and expense to create the feel of a real operating railroad. The ride was arguably quite scenic as well. Given that the railroad operated in northern New Jersey, where Becker had numerous customers who received milk deliveries—from the milkman—the railroad was also a unique public relations tool. From the late 1940s until well into the 1960s, the operation was extremely well patronized by the public.

In addition to the C&S, the Becker Farm also sold fresh vegetables, milk, chocolate milk and orange juice at a farm stand adjacent to the station. A favorite snacking spot was at the banks of Roaring Brook where one could sip one's chilled drink, munch on freshly harvested carrots, and watch the trains pass over the nearby trestle, all this while cows mooed and pigs oinked in the distance.

== Demise of the Becker Farm ==
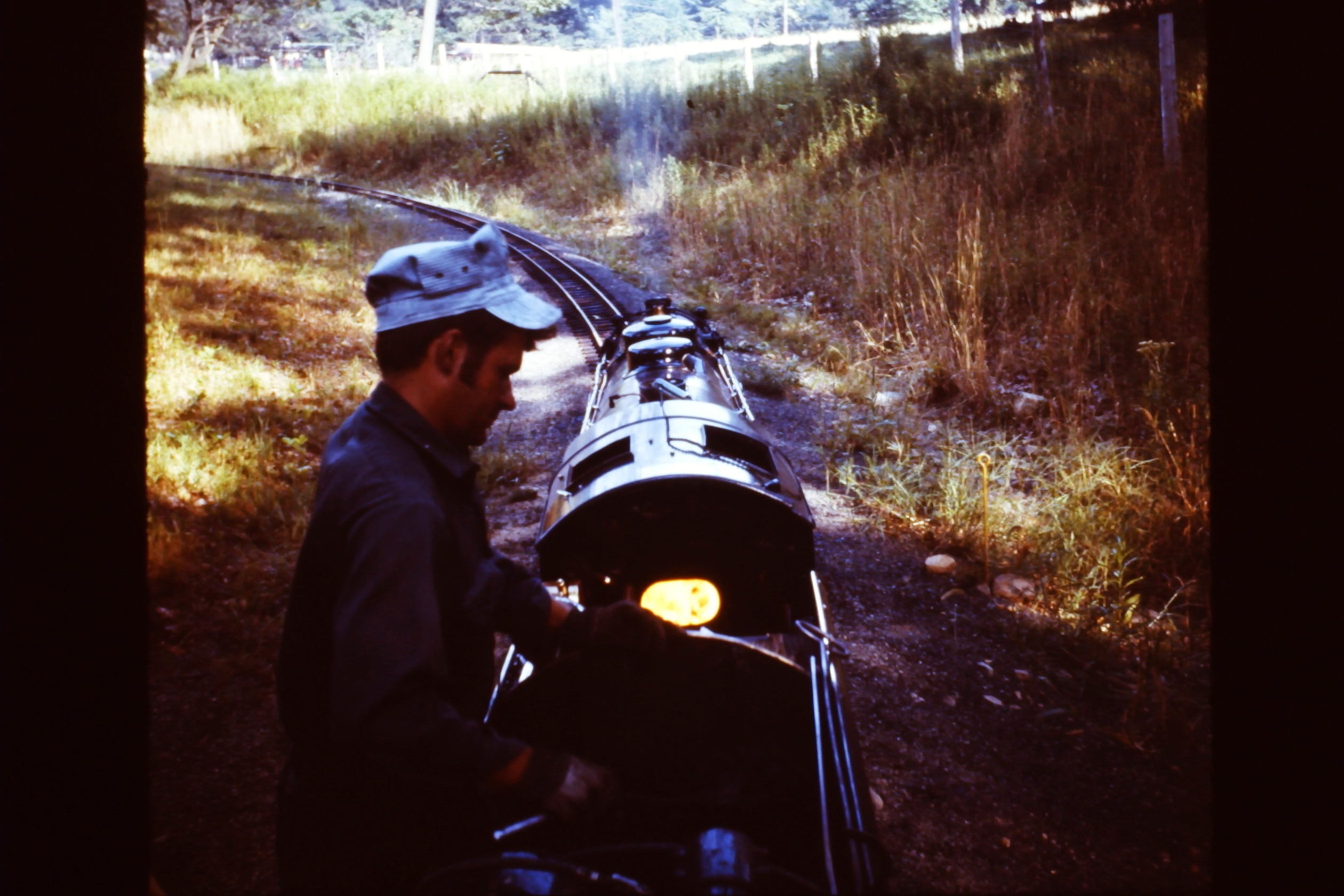
After the line to Peachtree Jct was abandoned at the end of the 1968 season, the recoaling stop for engine #1501 was moved to Paradise Valley, shown here during the final summer of operations (1972).

In 1968, the Becker family was notified by the New Jersey Department of Transportation that it intended to condemn a large swath of its property on the southwestern edge of the farm for the right-of-way of Interstate 280. As projected, the highway would obliterate most of the loop track beyond Peachtree Jct. In a surprising move, the Beckers appealed the proposed use of eminent domain and even requested the right to place the track under the highway; this was rejected by NJDOT and the highway was built as planned. As a result, the line was cut back to the wye at Peachtree Jct. and, in a throwback to the original operation of the line, locomotives were required to turn at the wye at the junction again.

In the meantime, a new line was built that left the main line beyond Horseshoe Curve and paralleled and then ducked under the Long Fill. The new line circled back in the general direction of Centerville, crossed over a pond on a new bridge (see photo below) and then returned on a new oval track. For a time, trains on the old line passed over the new line on a temporary bridge that had been constructed in the fill. When the new rail line was opened in 1969, the old line to Peachtree Jct. was abandoned. Ridership, unfortunately, continued to decline.

The deathknell to the railroad and the farm occurred in 1972 when the Roseland town council voted to rescind the farm's farm assessment, resulting in the 1,000 acres (4.0 km^{2}) of farmland being assessed as if it were owned commercially. The C&S ran through Labor Day of that year, with the final run pulling into the station near dusk. The farm was subsequently closed and was converted into a business campus.

Rumors of a business deal between members of the Roseland town council and land developers were never substantiated.

== Aftermath ==
In the aftermath of the closure of Becker Farm, the railroad was completely dismantled and was placed into storage. Locomotive #1501 was donated to the Henry Ford Museum in Michigan and then later was conveyed into private hands. It presently resides in the office of Spiral Industries in Howell Michigan. Locomotive #1500 was conveyed into private hands in 1965 and was used to operate the Key Western Railroad, a miniature railroad on Higgs Beach in Key West, Florida until 1984. Locomotive #1500, the original locomotive on the C&SRR dating back to 1938, has been rebuilt twice, most recently in 1950 as a switch engine in bright-red livery. The two miles (3.2 km) of track, with ties attached, and all the rolling stock, as well as diesel locomotive #1503, a larger single-cab diesel locomotive that was built in 1959, and first ran in 1960, eventually made its way to Middletown Township, New Jersey and then later to Phillipsburg, New Jersey. At Phillipsburg, a truncated piece of track is currently in operation during the warmer months which allows #1503 to take passengers on a short, 1,500 ft (460 m) trip using some of the original passenger cars from the Centerville & Southwestern Railroad. Originally, plans had been made to rebuild the entire two-mile (3 km) round-trip C&S operation at Phillipsburg as part of the NJ State Railroad and Transportation Museum (Heritage Center), but the needed 35-acre (140,000 m^{2}) parcel of land at Phillipsburg was ceded to a townhouse complex and college annex. Although, the C&S continues to run at Phillipsburg, it's unclear whether a return to full operation at Phillipsburg will be possible.

It has been announced that locomotive #1500, which left the Roseland, New Jersey operation in 1965 for the Key Western Railroad, a miniature railroad in the Florida Keys, will return to New Jersey in May 2011 for the season opening of the C&SRR in Phillipsburg, New Jersey.

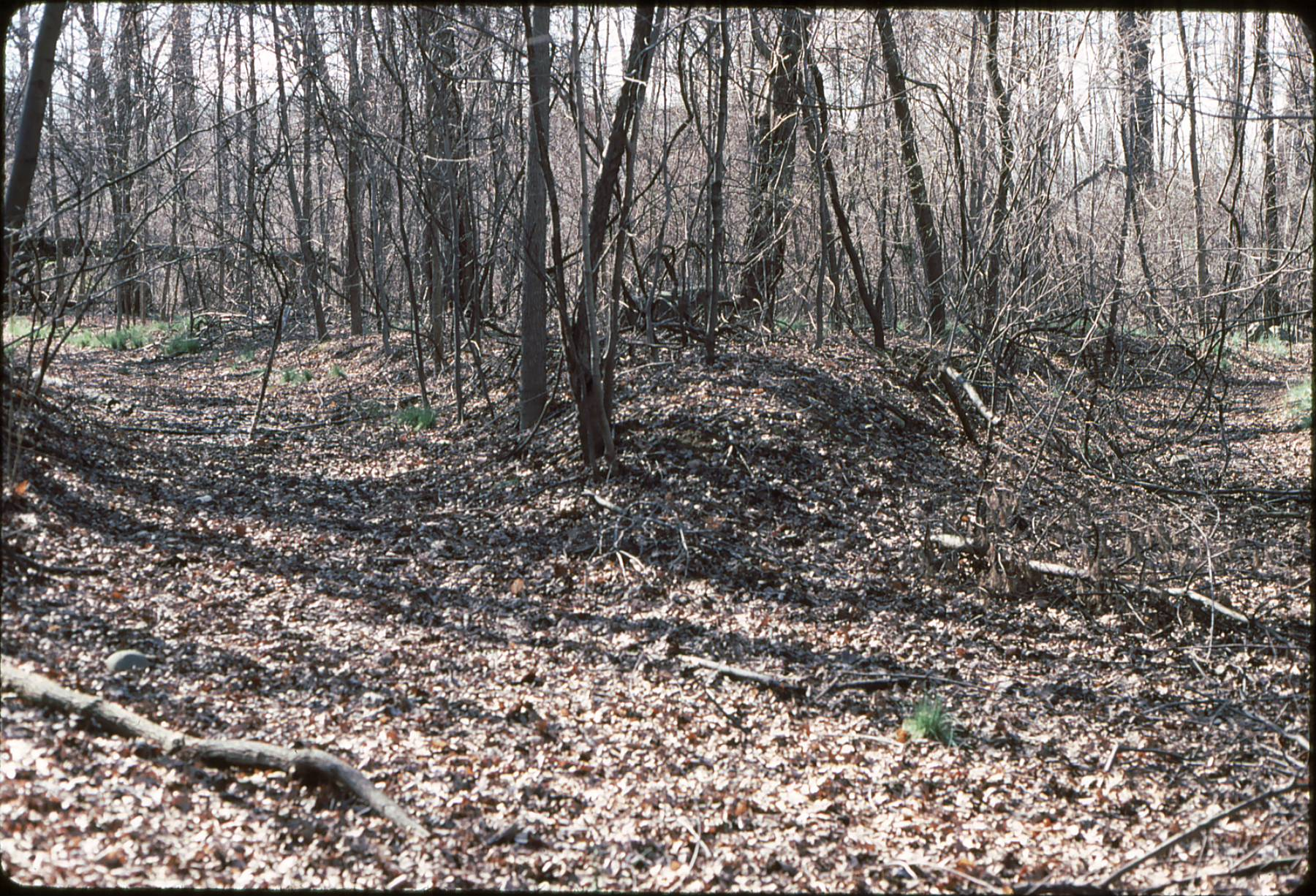
Peachtree Jct. in the winter of 1990, facing in the direction of the "loop" track. Note the "Y" arrangement of the still extant right-of-way. A switch track was located approximately near the bottom of the photograph.

To this day, vestiges of the Roseland operation still remain intact: the concrete bridge abutments of the 1938 and 1969 bridges over Foulerton Brook remain, although the surrounding area has been regraded and looks nothing like it did when the C&S was in operation; Peachtree Jct. can still be identified, particularly since the lead into the junction is through a rock cut (part of the oval right-of-way is still intact as well); the new bridge on the line opened in 1969 is still used by the business campus that occupies the Becker Farm land, where it passes over the same pond, with "C&S RR" still visible in the concrete abutment of the bridge.

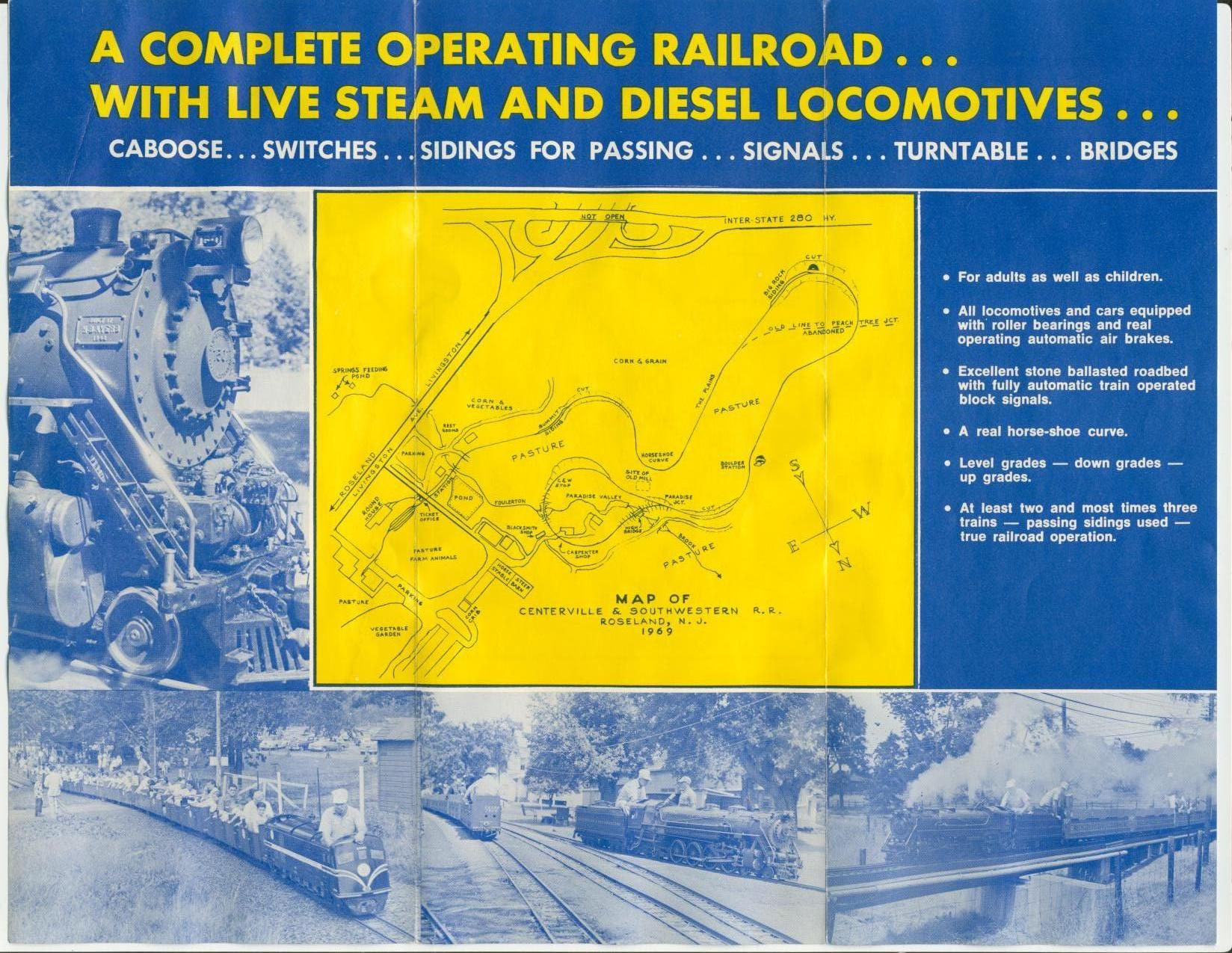
The inside view of the 1969 C&S RR brochure. Note that the railroad, before it was abandoned to Peachtree Jct. (dotted line on map, with junction shown in photo below), actually went southwest from Centerville.

The business campus is situated on what became Becker Farm Road. The Becker family's farm house still stands a short distance down the road from the business campus.
