= Sandy Ridge and Clear Lake Railway =

Ridable miniature railway in Battle Creek, Michigan

Sandy Ridge & Clear Lake Railway
Overview
- Headquarters: Battle Creek, Michigan
- Locale: Michigan
- Dates of operation: 1996–

Technical
- Track gauge: 7 1/2 in (190.5 mm)
- Length: Total Length: ~7000 feet Mainline Length: ~5400 feet

Sandy Ridge & Clear Lake Railway is a private, 7 1/2 in (190.5 mm) gauge ridable miniature railway located on 29 acres (120,000 m^{2}) of mostly wooded hills near Battle Creek in the state of Michigan. The railroad was built and owned by John "Jack" Ozanich, who was a retired locomotive engineer of the Grand Trunk Railroad. Jack died on May 29, 2020.

The railroad runs through rolling landscape, with grades of up to 5.2% on the mainline and 75ft minimum radius curves. The branch lines have switch backs and even steeper grades to change elevation rapidly. If the mainline is extended to completion, the railroad should have approximately 7,000 feet (2,100 m) of track. The railroad does not form a loop, since the ends of the line are separated vertically by nearly 90 feet (27 m).

The rolling stock used on the railroad is modelled in 3 3/4 inches per foot (5:16) scale to resemble the 2 ft (610 mm) narrow gauge locomotives, freight cars, coaches, and cabooses used by the Sandy River & Rangeley Lakes Railroad in the state of Maine.

== Rolling Stock ==
Locomotives
Number	Builder	Type	Date	Notes
3	John Korstange	2-axle Rail Bus		Lettered for the SR&CL. 5hp Honda gasoline.
4	Allen	2-Truck Shay		Lettered for the Clear Lake Logging Co. (CLL). 3-Cylinder 4 inch scale. Originally burned wood but now burns coal.
7	Jim Small	2-4-4T Forney locomotive		Lettered for the SR&CL. Patterned after B&SR #7. Burns coal.
10	Marty Knox http://www.ridgeboiler.com/	2-4-4T Forney locomotive	2005	Lettered for the SR&CL. Patterned after SR&RL #10. Originally was an oil burner but now burns coal.
24	Started - Jim Small Finishing - Marty Knox http://www.ridgeboiler.com/	2-6-2 Prairie	Under construction	Lettered for the SR&CL. Patterned after SR&RL #24. Burns coal.
25	John Korstange	B-B		Lettered for the SR&CL. Loosely resembles GE 70-ton. 18hp gasoline engine.

Freight Cars, Coach, and Cabooses
Number/Name	Type	Notes
437	Flat Car	Lettered for the SR&CL
438	Flat Car	Lettered for the SR&CL
439	Flat Car	Lettered for the SR&CL
440	Flat Car	Lettered for the SR&CL
12	Flat Car	Lettered for the CB&E
158	Box Car	Lettered for the SR&CL
501	Gondola	Lettered for the SR&CL. Carries snow plow in the winter
521	Gondola	Lettered for the SR&CL
559	Caboose	Lettered for the SR&CL. Based on SR&RL style caboose
560	Caboose	Lettered for the SR&CL. Four wheeler renumbered from C-1
Ailina	Coach	
