= Swiss Vapeur Parc =

Miniature park in Switzerland

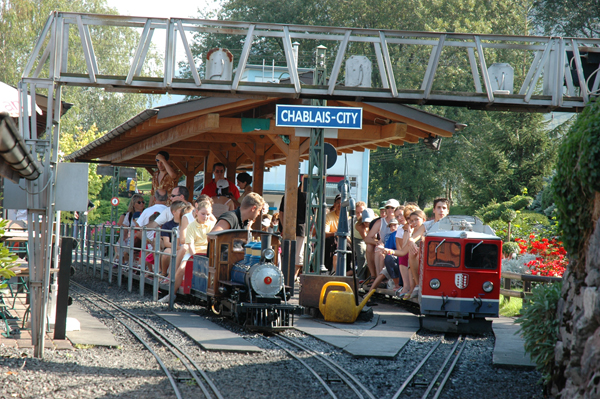
- Two trains leaving the fictional "Chablais City"
- Interactive map of Swiss Vapeur Parc
- Location: Le Bouveret, Valais, Switzerland
- Coordinates: 46°23′00″N 6°51′30″E
- Opened: June 6, 1989
- Operating season: April through November
- Area: 17'000 m² (4.2 acres)

Attractions
- Total: 1 (as it is a train circuit): 6 Trains running on Benzine; 12 Steam Trains
- Website: Swiss Vapeur Parc

The Swiss Vapeur Parc is a miniature park in Le Bouveret, a village on Lac Léman, Switzerland. It was opened on June 6, 1989, by an International Festival of Steam (therefore steam trains). When the park opened its total surface area was 9000 m^{2} (2.2 acres), but the park expanded and as of 2007, the park covers a surface area of 17'000 m^{2} (or 4.2 acres). In 1989, the park possessed only 2 locomotives (one running on benzine and one on steam). As of 2007, the number of trains running on benzine has sextupled while the number of steam trains has increased to 9 trains. By March 31, 2007, the Park has had 2'126'000 visitors.

Every June the park is host to the International Steam Festival.

== Image gallery ==
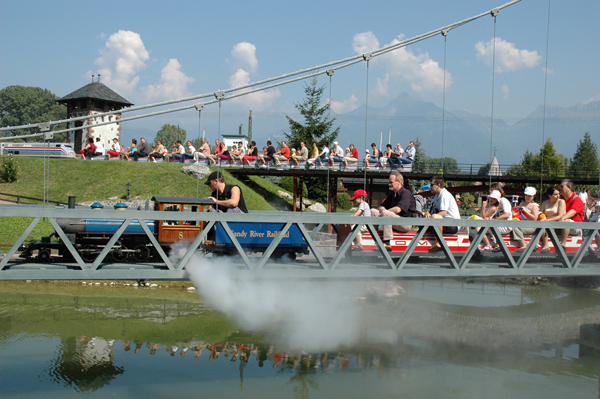
A train crosses a bridge in the parc

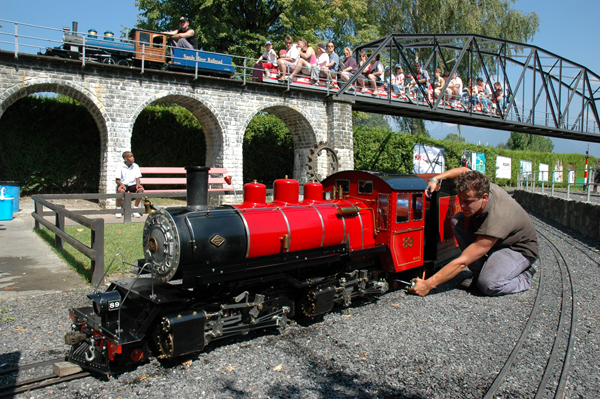
A train being oiled

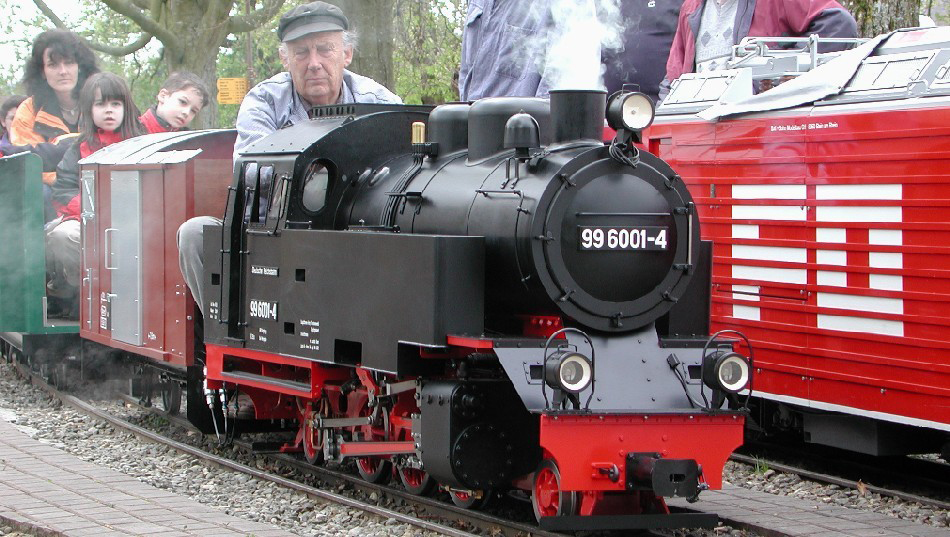
A tank engine

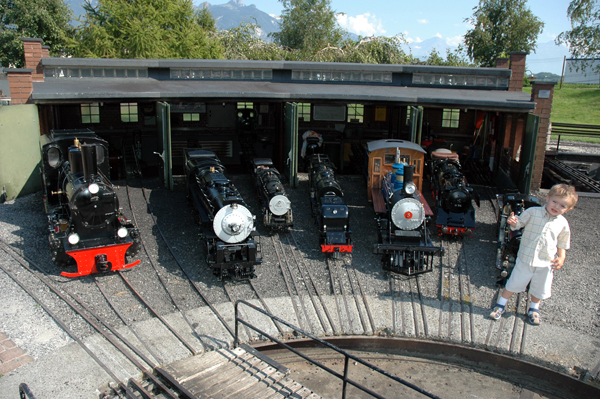
The first train shed
