= Finsbury Park TMD =

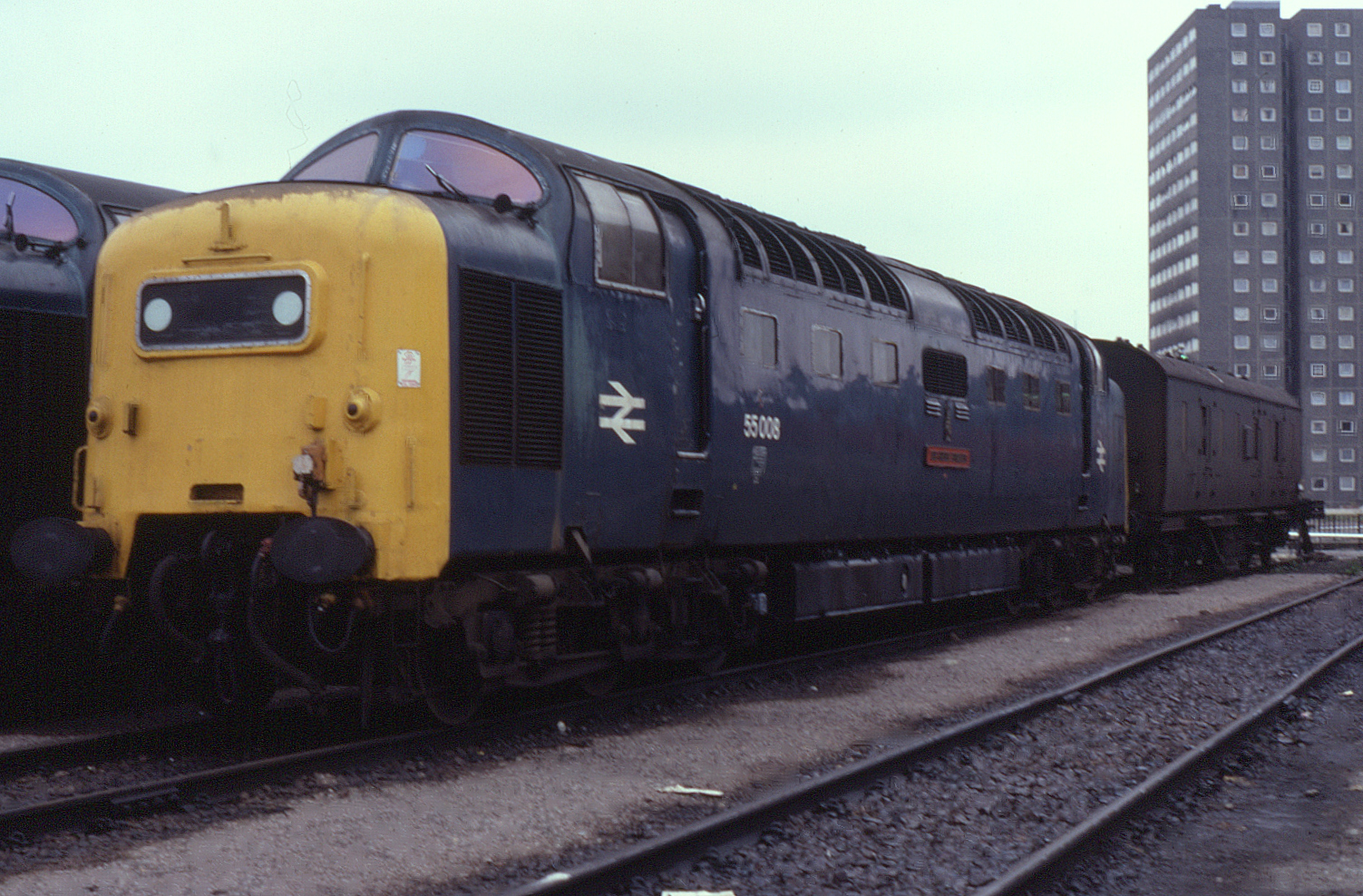
- 55008 "The Green Howards" at Finsbury Park depot on 14 November 1981
- Interactive map of Finsbury Park TMD

Location
- Location: Finsbury Park, Greater London
- Coordinates: 51.5582°N 0.1099°W
- OS grid: TQ310861

Characteristics
- Owner: British Rail
- Depot code: FP (1973 – 1983)
- Type: Diesel

History
- Former depot code: 34G (1960 – 1973)

Finsbury Park TMD was a railway traction maintenance depot situated in London, England. It was the first purpose-built main line diesel locomotive depot opened in England and it was fully commissioned in April 1960. Finsbury Park was allocated British Railways depot code 34G under the original alphanumeric system; the two letter code of the depot was FP. The nearest railway station is Finsbury Park.

The maintenance shed held six roads. Roads seven to eleven were located to the east, with number ten road also accommodating the breakdown train shed. Additionally there were five roads of stabling in Clarence Yard, which was nearest to the main running lines.

The depot was downgraded in June 1981 and closed in October 1983. The site is now covered in residential flats which can be seen to the south-west of Finsbury Park station.

== The Deltics ==
Following the closure of Kings Cross Top Shed and the withdrawal of steam locomotives, much of the traction power for express passenger workings on the East Coast Main Line was taken over by Class 55 Deltic diesel locomotives. Those allocated to Finsbury Park were named after famous racehorses, whilst those allocated to Haymarket TMD and Gateshead TMD were named after British Army regiments.

=== Finsbury Park's Deltics ===
| Original Number | TOPS number | Name | Withdrawn | Status |
|---|---|---|---|---|
| D9001 | 55 001 | St. Paddy | 5 January 1980 | Scrapped BREL Doncaster February 1980. |
| D9003 | 55 003 | Meld | 31 December 1980 | Scrapped BREL Doncaster March 1981. |
| D9007 | 55 007 | Pinza | 31 December 1981 | Scrapped BREL Doncaster August 1982. |
| D9009 | 55 009 | Alycidon | 2 January 1982 | Preserved – Mainline Registered |
| D9012 | 55 012 | Crepello | 18 May 1981 | Scrapped BREL Doncaster September 1981. |
| D9015 | 55 015 | Tulyar | 2 January 1982 | Preserved |
| D9018 | 55 018 | Ballymoss | 12 October 1981 | Scrapped BREL Doncaster January 1982. |
| D9020 | 55 020 | Nimbus | 5 January 1980 | Scrapped BREL Doncaster January 1980. |
