= British Rail HS4000 =

1967 prototype diesel locomotive

HS4000 "Kestrel"
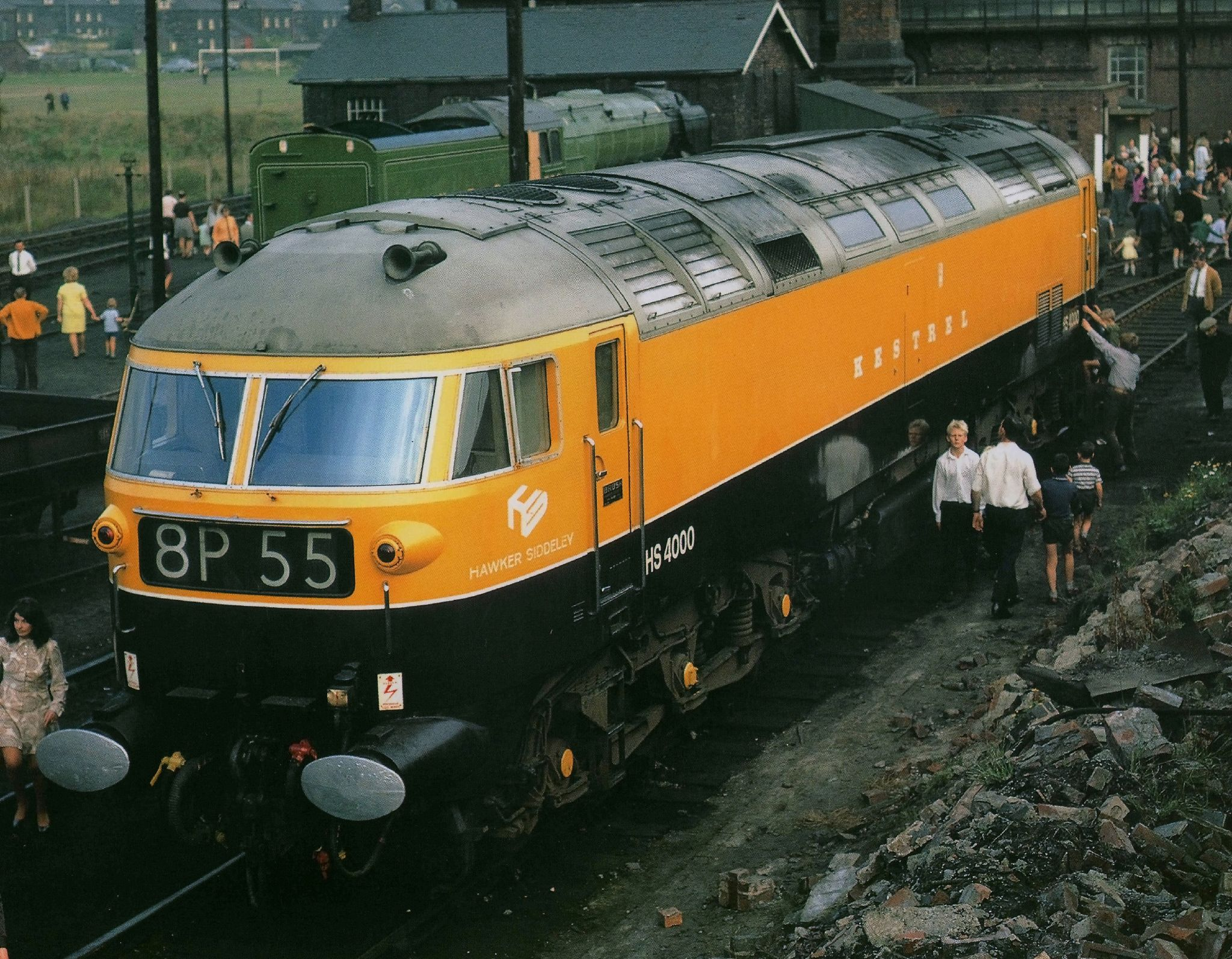
- HS 4000 at Barrow Hill Open Day 1971
Type and origin
- Power type: Diesel-electric
- Builder: Hawker Siddeley, at Brush Traction, Loughborough
- Serial number: Brush 711 (1967)
- Build date: Completed in 1967
Specifications
- Configuration
  - UIC: Co′Co′
- Gauge: Initially: 1,435 mm (4 ft 8 1/2 in) (UK); After 1971: 1,520 mm (4 ft 11 27/32 in) Russian gauge
- Wheel diameter: 3 ft 7 in (1.092 m); 1,092 mm (42.99 in)
- Wheelbase: 51 ft 8 in (15.75 m); Outer wheelset distance to middle axle: 7 ft 3 in (2.21 m); Inner wheelset distance to middle axle: 7 ft 8 in (2.34 m)
- Length: 66 ft 6 in (20.27 m)
- Width: 8 ft 9 3/4 in (2.69 m)
- Height: 12 ft 9 3/4 in (3.91 m)
- Axle load: ~22.2 long tons 21.5 t (with Class 47 type bogies)
- Loco weight: 133 long tons 6 hundredweight (135 t) (Note: Weighed at Derby on 22 January 1968, producing an overweight result.); 126 t (Note: Estimated, fully loaded, overall weight target.)
- Fuel capacity: 1,000 imp gal (4,500 L; 1,200 US gal)
- Prime mover: Sulzer 16LVA24
- Traction motors: 6 Brush Motors (DC)
- Transmission: three phase AC alternator, DC traction motors
- Train brakes: Dual (Air and Vacuum), electric regenerative dynamic brakes
Performance figures
- Maximum speed: 110 mph (180 km/h)
- Power output: Engine: 4,000 hp (2,983 kW) @1,100 rpm At rail: 2,500 kW (3,353 hp)
- Tractive effort: 450 kN (100,000 lbf) maximum 270 kN (61,000 lbf) @ 30 km/h (19 mph); 187 kN (42,000 lbf) @ 45 km/h (28 mph)
Career
- Operators: British Railways, Soviet Railways
- Disposition: Exported to Russia July 1971, later scrapped c. 1993.

HS4000 Kestrel was a prototype high-powered mainline diesel locomotive that was built in 1967 by Brush Traction, Loughborough, as a technology demonstrator for potential future British Rail and export orders. The locomotive number is a combination of the initials of Hawker Siddeley (the owners of Brush Traction) and the power rating of its Sulzer diesel engine (4,000 hp), making it the most powerful locomotive built by the company.

It was of Co-Co wheel arrangement and was fitted with a Sulzer 16LVA24 engine rated at 4,000 horsepower (3,000 kW) providing a maximum speed of 110 mph (180 km/h) (Note: Sustained maximum speed, based on the traction motor gearing) and weighed 133 tonnes. It was painted in a livery of yellow ochre with a broad chocolate-brown band around the lower bodyside separated by a thin white line running around the body.

== Background and design ==
In the mid-1960s British rail produced specifications for type 5 locomotives weighing less than 126 tonnes with more than 3,000 hp (2,200 kW) of power for both passenger and freight working. Brush Electric Engineering Ltd. (Brush Traction) in association with Sulzer Brothers Ltd. responded with a 4,000 hp (3,000 kW) locomotive for British Rail's appraisal. The body, exterior details, control console, and colours were designed by E.G. M. Wilkes of "Wilkes & Ward" (later Wilkes & Ashmore, industrial design firm based on Horsham, West Sussex). The design principle was that a single engine would require less maintenance than twin-engined vehicles, and that the very high power would mean that double heading for freight trains would be unnecessary.

=== Diesel engine ===
Brush employed Sulzer's 16-cylinder Vee 16LVA24 engine made in Winterthur. Previous experience with Sulzer's 12-cylinder twin parallel-bank dual-crank 12LDA28 engine had gone well, but the highest power available from Sulzer in this form was the 12LDA31 of 2,350 hp (1,750 kW). Not only did the V engines provide over 3,000 hp (2,200 kW), but being single-crank with the consequently lighter engine block (over the dual-bank design) gave a better power-to-weight ratio.

The engine is a four-stroke turbocharged oil-cooled design, with the oil being cooled by water in a heat exchanger, and the water cooled in radiators. The piston was 240 mm × 280 mm (9.4 in × 11.0 in). A smaller auxiliary generator (~40 kW (54 hp)) was used to charge the batteries or start the engine etc.

=== Electrical transmission and auxiliary electrical system ===
To transmit this power to the rail Brush utilised a brushless salient pole (Note: Salient-Pole Machines General description of salient pole machines as both motors and generators mysite.du.edu) three phase alternator connected to a rectifying circuit of 84 silicon diodes producing ~2,500 kW (3,400 hp) of power for electric traction from the diesel engine. An auxiliary alternator, also brushless and producing three phase electrical power gave ~500 kW (670 hp) for electrical train heating, and also supplied power to electrical fans etc. in the locomotive. The armatures/rotors for both alternators were electrically energised (Note: i.e. not permanent magnet type) by DC produced by the rectified output of brushless alternators. (Note: Thus the excitor alternators, and the main alternator's rotor were coaxial and connected, with the rectifying diodes also undergoing rotary motion)

Each of the 6 axles was powered by an individual traction motor which was a four pole force ventilated type. Connection of the axle to the motor was via a reduction gear (giving 110 mph (180 km/h) top speed), then through a flexible hollow shaft drive to the axle.

The fans (blowers) to cool the traction motors and engine radiators were of the three phase asynchronous type, the motors driving the compressors, pumps, fans for the dynamic (resistive) brake etc. were DC motors.

=== Braking system ===
Locomotive braking was by vacuum, air (high pressure) or dynamic (electrical regenerative resistive braking), the dynamic brakes were preferentially used at high speeds, with the air brake being activated at lower speeds where dynamic braking was less effective; speed sensors automatically determined the braking type to be used. Additionally a hydraulically activated parking brake was fitted.

=== Electronic devices ===
Plug-in solid state modules were used for voltage and power control including monitoring wheelslip and monitoring engine temperature.

=== Superstructure construction ===
A Warren truss body construction with welded, stressed steel skin was used on the sides of the locomotive which supported the transverse load of the main engine entirely.

=== Bogies ===
The bogie side frames were of one piece cast construction with coil spring suspension, connected by 4 transverse members; two internal and two at either end

After the Hither Green rail crash, British Rail issued a directive that all locomotives should have an axle weight of no-more than 21 long tons (21.3 t; 23.5 short tons). In an attempt to comply with this, Brush fitted the locomotive with modified British Rail Class 47 bogies. The lighter construction and traction motors helped but the attempt was ultimately unsuccessful leaving Kestrel at 22.5 long tons (22.9 t; 25.2 short tons) per axle. Kestrel continued to be used but the axle-weight problem contributed to the decision to sell the locomotive and prior to this, in March 1971, the original bogies were refitted.

=== Cabs ===
The driver's cab is attached to the frame below by rubber fittings. Driver controls were similar to that of Class 47.

== Career ==
=== British Rail ===
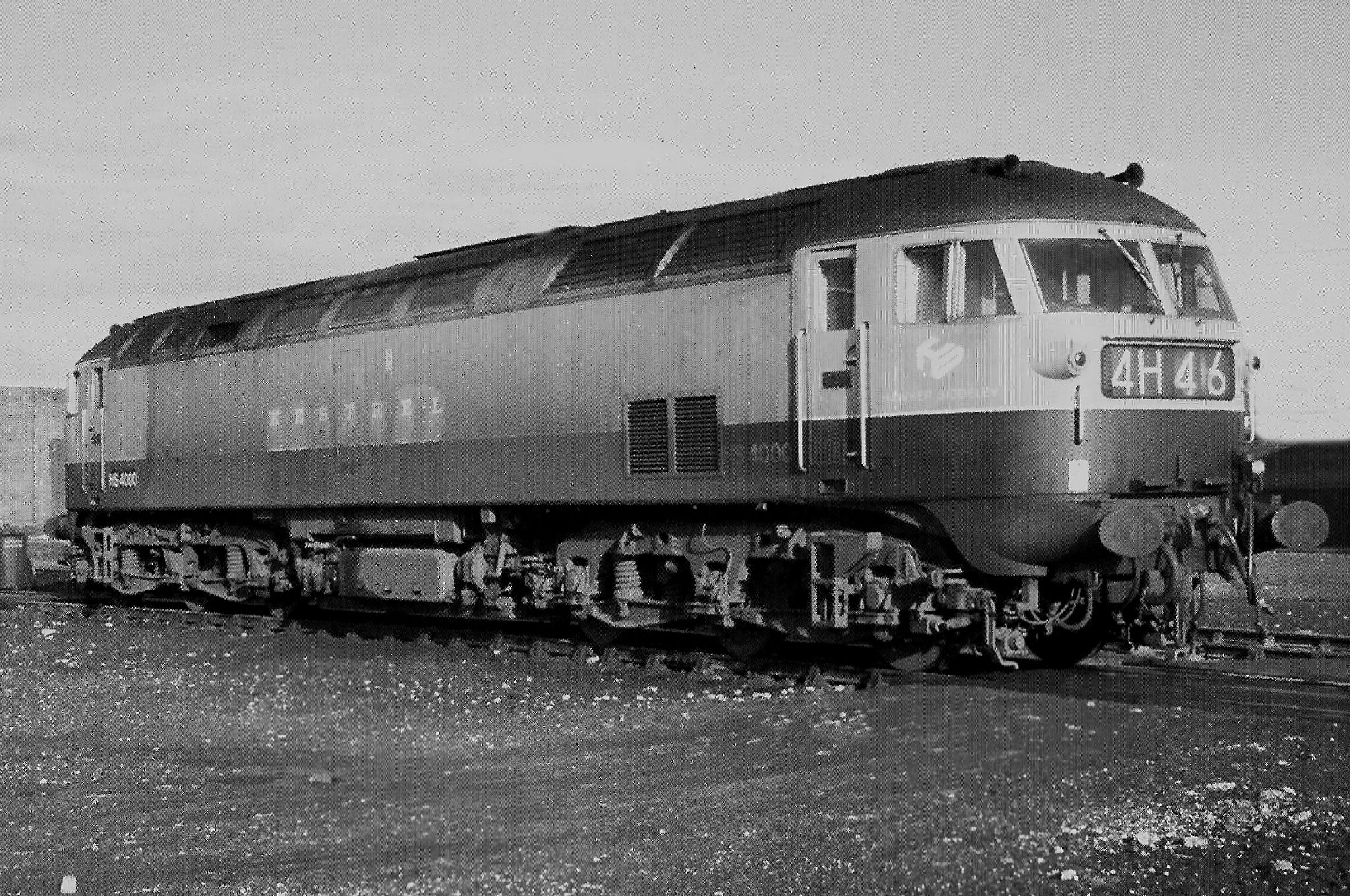
HS4000 at Clipstone Colliery

Construction of the locomotive (Brush works No. 711 of 1967) started in 1966 and was complete by 1967. However the locomotive was considerably over the 20 long tons (20.3 t; 22.4 short tons) axle-load limit specified by British Rail for its procurement requirements. The locomotive was officially handed over to BR on 29 January 1968 at Marylebone Station. Test runs were performed with both passenger and freight stock; the locomotive was primarily used to haul heavy freight trains - including a coal train of over 2,000 long tons (2,032 t; 2,240 short tons) weight - the locomotive achieved an 88% availability figure after 14,000 miles (23,000 km).

Following the fitting of its new bogies the locomotive was used on express passenger trains. On a London King's Cross to Newcastle service diagrammed for British Rail Class 55 ('Deltic') operation the unit was 14 minutes faster than required even though the new traction motors meant reduced power at the rail.

In March 1971 it was withdrawn from service in the UK and sent back to Brush for refitting.

=== Sale to Soviet Union ===
The locomotive was sold to the Soviet Union in 1971 for £127,000, being shipped from Cardiff Docks to Leningrad docks by the MV Krasnokamsk in July 1971. On arrival in Russia, Kestrel was exhibited at the Moscow Rolling Stock Exhibition and then was moved to the All-Union Rail Transport Scientific Research Institute at Shcherbinka where it was re-gauged to 1,520 mm (4 ft 11 27/32 in), and tested on a circular test railway (Note: See ru:Экспериментальная кольцевая железная дорога ВНИИЖТ : Experimental test railway VNIIZhT in the Yuzhnoye Butovo District. VNIIZhT (ВНИИЖТ) is the Russian railway research institute of railway transport (Всероссийский научно-исследовательский институт железнодорожного транспорта) See Экспериментальное кольцо ВНИИЖТа 'Experimental ring VNIIZhT' www.vniizht.ru) as well as being used on some parts of the Russian rail network.

After testing of the locomotive the engine was removed for static testing, and the locomotive body ballasted for use in high load tests of other vehicles.

The remains of the vehicle are believed to have been scrapped in 1993.

== Conclusions ==
=== United Kingdom ===
The locomotive did not result in any further orders.

=== Russia ===
Some of the observations of Russian railway engineers relate to different practices between Russian and British locomotive design, specifically:

- Due to the smaller loading gauges in Great Britain, the cab windows were set too low for signals to be seen if the driver is standing.
- The passages were too narrow.
- The bogies were considered overly large.
- The requirement to sling the engine and compressor below the main frame was considered unusual.
- The stressed skin construction was noted as being not suitable due to corrosion increasing the susceptibility to structural weakening, as the load-bearing skin is thin and point welded.

The axle bearings, traction transmission and spherical rubber metal joints in the suspension were considered of interest.

=== Developments ===
Some of the HS4000's technology was used to form the basis of, or improvements in, subsequent locomotives built in the Soviet Union. Kestrel's technology was incorporated into the Soviet locomotive TEP70 in 1973.

== Models ==
HS4000 "Kestrel" is made as a kit and ready-to-run in OO gauge by Silver Fox Models.

Heljan of Denmark have produced a highly detailed OO scale model of the Kestrel, as part of a limited run of 4000 units.

The Swanley New Barn Railway, in Swanley, Kent, operates a 7 1/4 inch gauge overscale version of the 'kestrel' which was built by Mardyke Miniature Railways. Unlike the full size, this model is a diesel-hydraulic.

== References and notes ==
=== Sources ===
- Stevens-Stratten, S.W.; Carter, R.S. (1978). British Rail Main-Line Diesels. Shepperton: Ian Allan Ltd. ISBN 978-0-7110-0617-1.
- Toms, George (1978). Brush Diesel Locomotives, 1940-78. Sheffield: Turntable Publications. ISBN 978-0902844483. OCLC 11213057.
- Егунов, П. (2000). "Тепловоз "КЕСТРЕЛ" "back in the USSR ..."" [Diesel locomotive Kestrel back in the USSR ...] (PDF). Локотранс (in Russian). 47 (9): 14–17. Archived from the original (PDF) on 19 February 2014.
- Webb, Brian (1978). Sulzer Diesel Locomotives of British Rail. David & Charles. ISBN 0715375148.
