= British Rail Class 55 =

Class of diesel electric locomotives

English Electric Type 5 British Rail Class 55
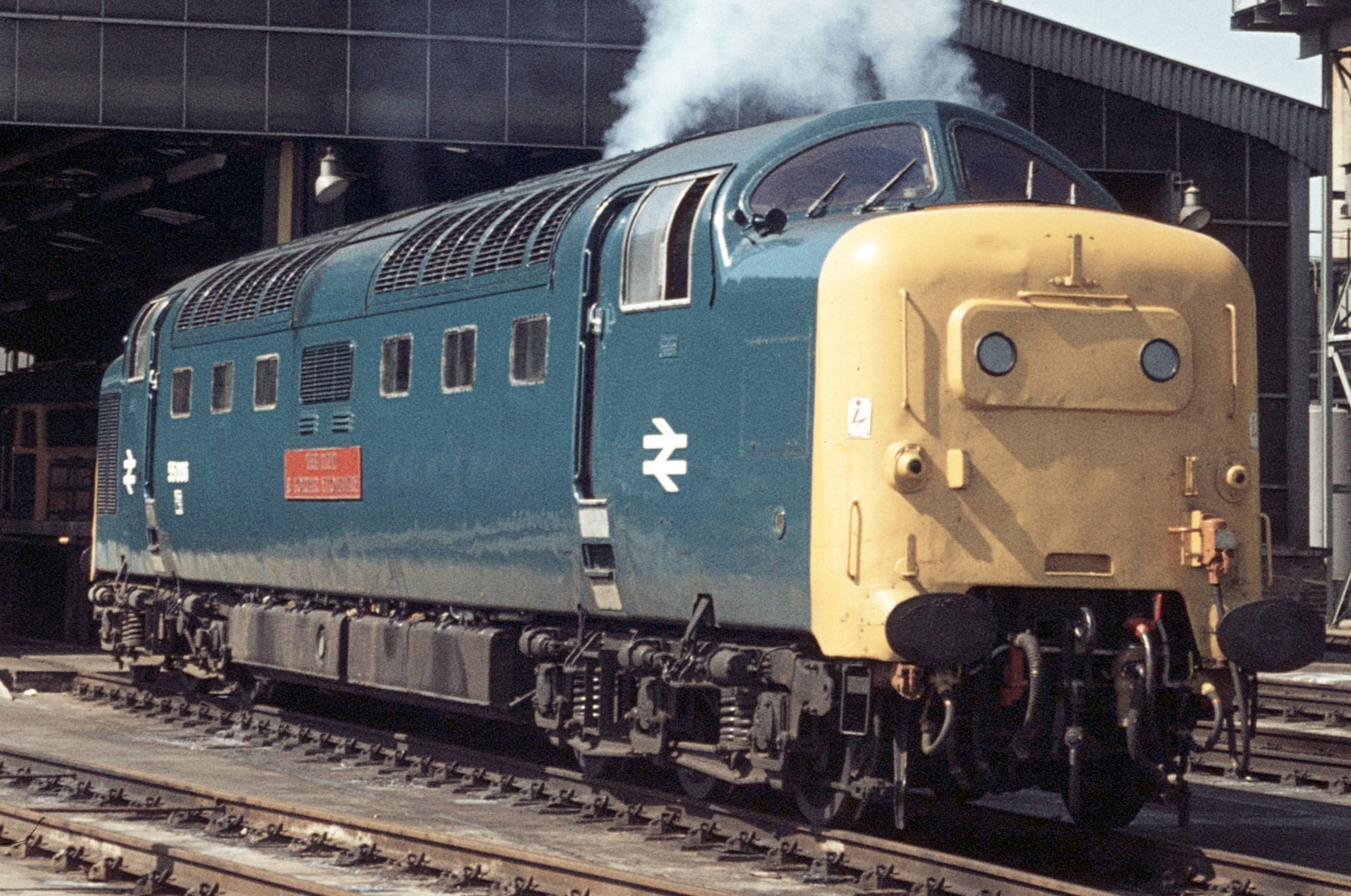
- 55006 The Fife & Forfar Yeomanry at Finsbury Park Depot in 1977
Type and origin
- Power type: Diesel-electric
- Builder: English Electric at Vulcan Foundry
- Build date: 1961–1962
- Total produced: 22
Specifications
- Configuration
  - UIC: Co′Co′
  - Commonwealth: Co-Co
- Gauge: 4 ft 8 1/2 in (1,435 mm) standard gauge
- Wheel diameter: 3 ft 9 in (1.143 m)
- Wheelbase: 58 ft 6 in (17.83 m)
- Length: 69 ft 6 in (21.18 m)
- Width: 8 ft 9 1/2 in (2.68 m)
- Height: 12 ft 10 in (3.91 m)
- Loco weight: 99 long tons (101 t; 111 short tons)
- Fuel capacity: 900 imp gal (4,100 L; 1,100 US gal)
- Prime mover: Napier Deltic D18-25, × 2
- Generator: English Electric DC generator
- Traction motors: DC traction motors
- Transmission: Diesel electric
- MU working: Not fitted
- Train heating: Steam; later Electric Train Heating
- Train brakes: Vacuum; later Dual (Air and Vacuum)
Performance figures
- Maximum speed: 100 mph (160 km/h)
- Power output: Engines: 1,650 bhp (1,230 kW) × 2 (Total: 3,300 bhp (2,460 kW))
- Tractive effort: Maximum: 50,000 lbf (222 kN); Continuous: 30,500 lbf (136 kN)@ 32.5 mph (52.3 km/h)
Career
- Operators: British Railways
- Numbers: D9000–D9021; later 55022, 55001–55021
- Nicknames: Deltics
- Axle load class: Route availability 5
- Withdrawn: 1980–1982
- Preserved: 55022 (D9000), 55002 (D9002), 55009 (D9009), 55015 (D9015), 55016 (D9016) and 55019 (D9019). Cabs from 55008 (D9008) and 55021 (D9021) also preserved.
- Disposition: Six preserved, remainder scrapped

The British Rail Class 55, also known as a Deltic, or English Electric Type 5, is a class of diesel locomotive built in 1961 and 1962 by English Electric for British Railways. Twenty-two locomotives were built, designed for the high-speed express passenger services on the East Coast Main Line (ECML) between Edinburgh and London King's Cross. They gained the name "Deltic" from the prototype locomotive, DP1 Deltic (the running number DP1 was never carried), which in turn was named after its Napier Deltic power units.

At the time of their introduction into service in 1961, the Class 55 was the most powerful single-unit diesel locomotives in the world, with a power output of 3,300 hp (2,500 kW). They had an official service speed of 100 mph (160 km/h), and introduced the first regular 100 mph diesel passenger service to Britain. They were capable of higher speeds than this, and often exceeded their official maximum in service, especially in their later years, with speeds of up to 117 mph (188 km/h) being recorded on level gradients, and up to 125 mph (201 km/h) whilst descending Stoke Bank.

Despite their successes, the Deltics had a relatively short commercial service life of 20 years. From 1978, they were displaced by the next generation of high speed diesels, the "InterCity 125" High Speed Trains (HSTs). Deltics were subsequently relegated mostly to secondary services on the Kings Cross to York, Edinburgh and Hull routes, although they continued to operate some top-link trains, such as the Hull Executive, until 1981. As a small, non-standard fleet, with high running costs, no viable alternative use could be found for the Deltics, and all were withdrawn from service between January 1980 and December 1981. Six of the locomotives were saved for preservation.

== Background ==
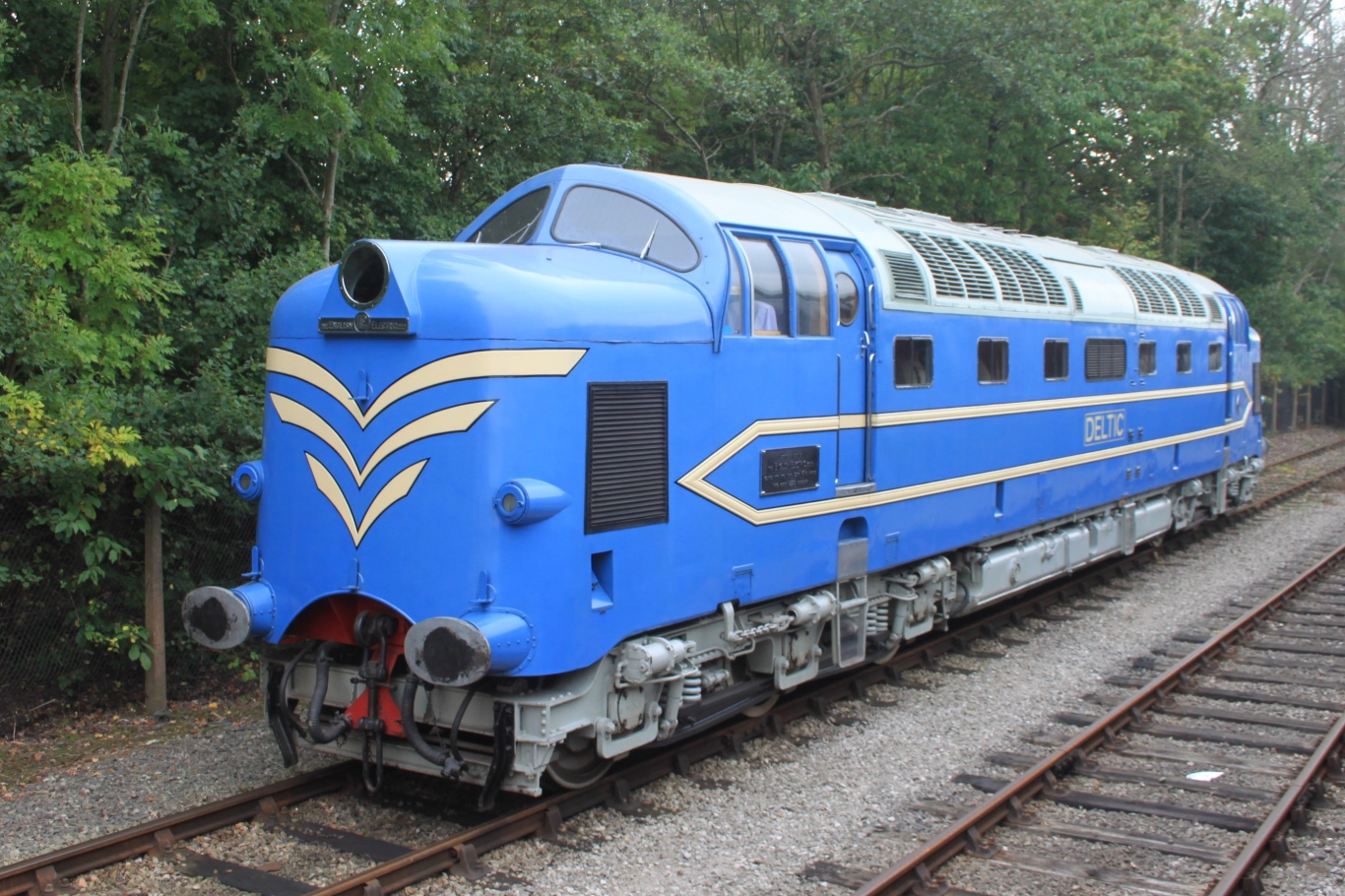
DP1, the prototype Deltic displayed at Preston Riverside in 2015

In 1955, the English Electric company produced a prototype diesel locomotive at the Dick, Kerr & Co works in Preston, officially named the DP1 but commonly known as Deltic. This prototype experimentally used two Napier Deltic engines which had been developed for marine applications. These unconventional engines were configured in a triangle with an opposed piston design. They ran at high speed (1,500 RPM) more than twice that of conventionally configured engines, which made them very powerful relative to their size and weight, compared to the conventional diesel engines of the era. The locomotive used two of these engines, both rated at 1,650 horsepower (1,230 kW), which gave the locomotive a combined power output of 3,300 horsepower (2,500 kW) for a weight of 106 tons.

The other notable features of the locomotive were its large size by British standards and striking styling, which was inspired by the bulldog nosed American diesels of the era.

At the same time, the management of the British Railways Eastern Region were looking for a replacement for their pre-war fleet of Class A4 steam locomotives for use on top-link expresses on the East Coast Main Line. There was a contemporary (1957) proposal to electrify the ECML; however, this had a proposed completion date of 1970. Gerry Fiennes, the traffic manager of the ECML, believed that his expresses should be able to achieve an end-to-end average speed of 70–75 mph (113–121 km/h) in order to remain competitive with other forms of transport, he felt that they could not wait more than a decade for service improvements by electrification when the expanding road network was taking away passengers, and opted instead for high speed-diesel traction as an interim solution.

The management of the Eastern Region were however unimpressed by the performance of the best conventional diesels of the time, the English Electric Type 4, which for a weight of 133 tons, produced 2,000 horsepower (1,500 kW), which meant that their overall performance was no better than the A4 steam locomotives they were supposed to replace. However, as the Deltic prototype had the necessary power and speed to outperform any steam locomotive, and achieve Gerry Fiennes's desired service improvements, he persuaded British Railways to purchase a fleet of locomotives based on it.

== Production ==
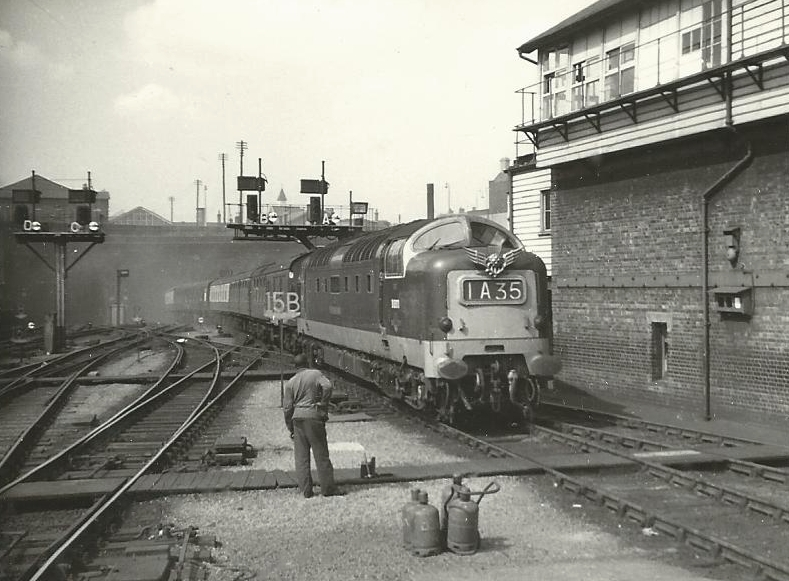
D9013 The Black Watch at Kings Cross in 1966 with the Flying Scotsman train, in BR green with small yellow warning panels

In March 1958, an order was placed with English Electric for a production fleet of 22 locomotives (reduced from the 23 originally planned), replacing more than twice that number (55) of steam locomotives including 35 A4 Pacifics; as steam locomotives require substantial time to clean, fuel, and fire, such a reduction in the number of units could be undertaken without a corresponding reduction in working availability. The full order was worth £3,410,000 (equivalent to £69,430,000 in 2025), working out at £155,000 (equivalent to £3,160,000 in 2025), per locomotive. Due to the complexity of the engine design, which needed specialist maintenance, the locomotives were purchased under a five year service contract, with English Electric agreeing to maintain them, including their engines and generators, for a fixed price; this was British Rail's first such contract. Additional Deltic engines were produced to enable engines to be exchanged regularly for overhaul while keeping the locomotives in service. English Electric trained the British Rail staff at the Doncaster Works in the techniques of maintaining the engines, and after the contract ended, they took over this responsibility.

The production locomotives were built at the Vulcan Foundry at Newton-le-Willows; they were mechanically little changed from the prototype, but differed in appearance with a toned down styling, sporting a more sober colour scheme, and lacking the prototype's large headlight. The production Deltics were also 7 tons lighter than the prototype, weighing in at 99 tons, despite being nearly 2 feet (0.61 m) longer. They were originally planned to be delivered within a year from March 1960, but this deadline was not met, and they were delayed by a year, with the first Deltic entering revenue service in the summer of 1961, with a full service being introduced the following year.

The locomotives were assigned to three locomotive depots: Finsbury Park in London, Gateshead near Newcastle, and Haymarket in Edinburgh. Very soon, all were named; the Gateshead and Edinburgh Haymarket locomotives after regiments of the British Army from the North-East of England and from Scotland, respectively, while Finsbury Park followed the London and North Eastern Railway (LNER) tradition of naming locomotives after winning racehorses.

At the same time, English Electric built a further ten locomotives which were later classified as the Class 23, which had single Napier Deltic engines; these gained the nickname "Baby Deltics" as they were in effect scaled down versions of the Deltics. These locomotives however, were far less successful in service than their larger cousins, and were all withdrawn by 1971.

== British Rail service ==
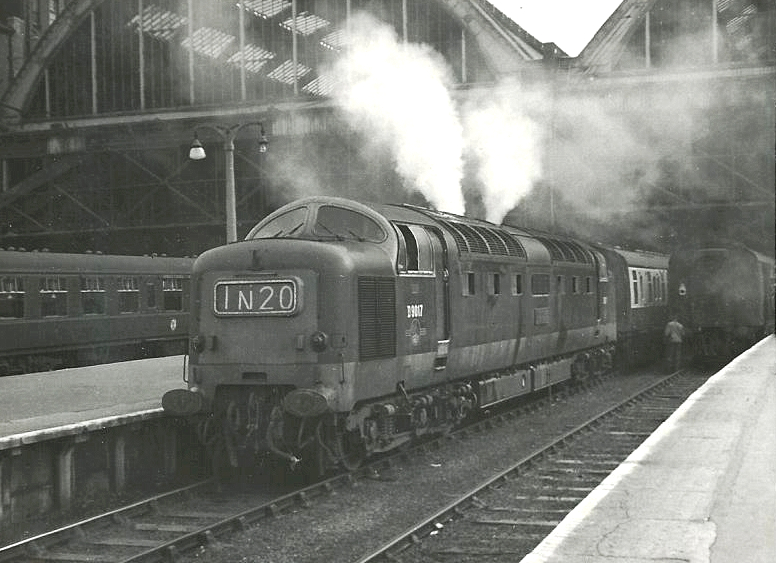
D9017 The Durham Light Infantry starting its engines at King's Cross on an express to Leeds in 1966

Distribution of locomotives, March 1974
British Rail Class 55 is located in England
Code	Name	Quantity
FP	Finsbury Park	8
GD	Gateshead	6
HA	Haymarket	8
Total:		22

The introduction of the Deltics was a step change in locomotive performance on the East Coast Main Line. The Motive Power Chief overseeing the introduction of diesel locomotives in British Railways' Eastern Region, A.J. (Jack) Somers wrote: "Thankfully this was one class of diesel [Deltics] that came up to the claims of the manufacturer and were worthy successors to the A4's".

Once the entire fleet was delivered into service in 1962, the timetable was accelerated, with the journey time from London to Edinburgh cut by one hour, from seven hours to six; this was enabled by the Deltics' ability to accelerate rapidly and maintain high speed with a heavy train over long distances. This matched the timing of the pre-war A4-hauled Coronation service, but was achieved without priority over other traffic unlike the earlier LNER train; it was also now the timing of normal standard fare expresses throughout the day, and not just a once-a-day premium fare express. From 1966 the infrastructure on the ECML was progressively upgraded to allow higher speeds in order to take better advantage of the Deltics' capabilities; this included upgrading the track, with more sections passed for 100 mph running, and other improvements such as the easing of sharp curves and improving the alignments through various stations. By 1973, these upgrades had allowed another half-hour to be cut from the London–Edinburgh journey time, with the Deltic-hauled Flying Scotsman, timetabled to reach Edinburgh in 5 ½ hours, with one stop at Newcastle, achieving an average speed of 71 mph (114 km/h) over the entire 393-mile (632 km) journey.

On one of O. S. Nock's first Deltic runs (the down Heart of Midlothian loaded to 13 coaches, 530 tons gross) he stated "once the tail of the train was over the 60 mph restriction the throttle was opened to the full, and the surge forward could be felt in the cab. Never previously had I felt a positive thrust in my back when in the second man's seat!" Nock went on to estimate that at 80 mph (130 km/h) the locomotive was producing about 2,750 drawbar horsepower.

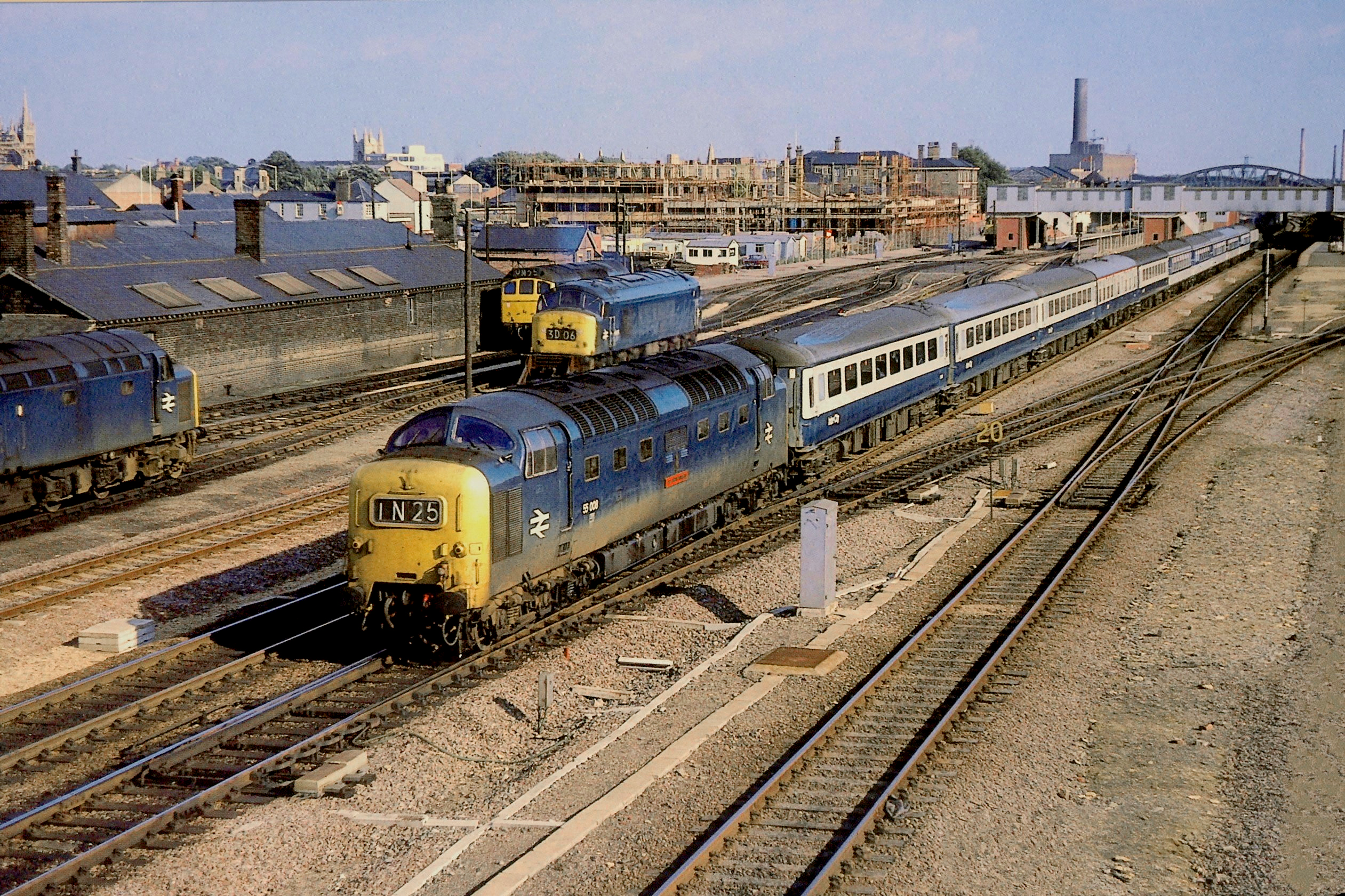
55008 The Green Howards passes Peterborough on King's Cross to Newcastle in 1974

As early as 1963, Deltics were recorded exceeding 100 mph, Nock recording 100 mph for 16 miles (26 km) south of Thirsk with a maximum of 104 mph (167 km/h); he went on to say that such speeds in 1963 were "terrific".

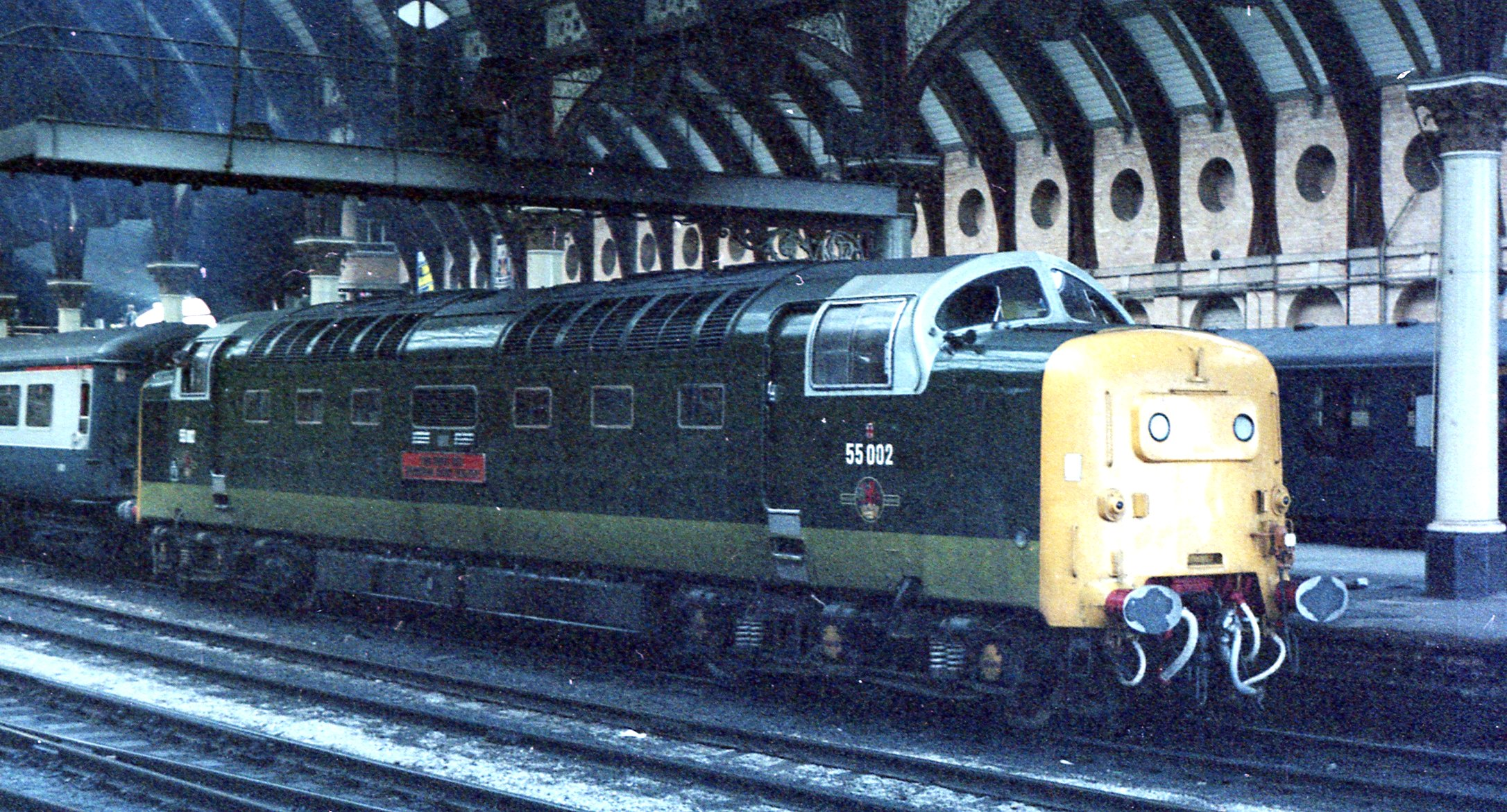
55002 King's Own Yorkshire Light Infantry at York in 1981, painted in the original two-tone green livery

The ultimate Deltic performance came on 2 February 1978 with a run on the 07:25 from Newcastle to King's Cross. In some respects, the run was set up (the driver was about to retire) but the speeds were record-breaking. The locomotive was 55008 The Green Howards; it was hauling 10 coaches (343 tons gross), and on the leg from York to London it achieved a timing of 137 min 15 seconds. This included various signal stops and other enforced speed reductions; the net time is estimated at 115 min 45 seconds, an average of 97 mph (156 km/h) start to stop. The train achieved 113 mph (182 km/h) on the flat between Darlington and York, 114 mph (183 km/h) at Offord and 125 mph (201 km/h) whilst descending Stoke Bank.

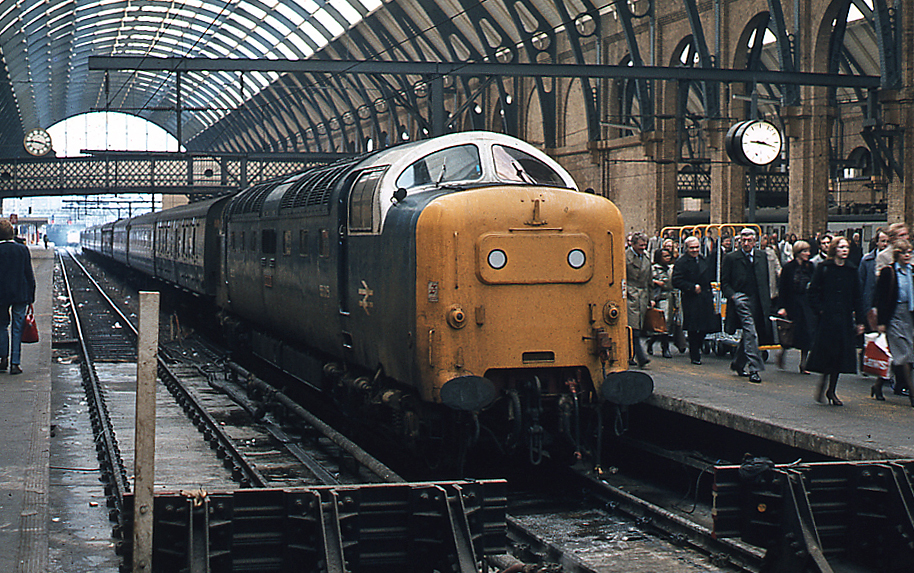
55015 "Tulyar" at King's Cross after arrival from Peterborough in 1978

From 1978, the ECML was upgraded to allow 125 mph running, in order to accommodate the InterCity 125s, and although the Deltics were still officially limited to 100 mph, in practice they frequently exceeded this in service. The fastest regular scheduled Deltic service was the Hull Executive between London and Hull, which was inaugurated in May 1978. The down (northbound) working of this service achieved an average speed of 91.4 mph (147.1 km/h) from King's Cross to its first stop at Retford, making it the fastest regular locomotive-hauled train in Britain at the time. Maintaining this schedule required sustained periods of running above 100 mph. The published logs of some of these runs show that Deltics cruised at up to 110 mph (180 km/h). The Hull Executive was one of the last top-link workings by a Deltic, until 1981, when this service was taken over by HST's.

The Railway Performance Society estimate that on modern infrastructure (the Selby Diversion etc.) a realistic Deltic-hauled schedule from King's Cross to Edinburgh would be around 4 hours 57 minutes (a theoretical unchecked run being around 4 hours 40 minutes). This would be for a train of 11 coaches and include a stop at Newcastle, the latter city being reached in a scheduled 3 hours 6 minutes.

The Deltics had arrived from the manufacturer painted in two-tone green, the dark BR green on top, with a narrower strip of a lighter, lime green along the bottom. This helped to disguise the bulk of the locomotive body. The cab window surrounds were picked out in cream-white. Although delivered without them bright yellow warning panels were applied from 1962 at each end (common to all British diesel and electric locomotives) to make them more conspicuous. By 1966 the InterCity branding was introduced, and the Deltics began to be painted in corporate Rail Blue with yellow ends, the change generally coinciding with a works repair and the fitting of air brake equipment, the locomotives originally having only vacuum braking (the first so treated was D9002; the last to be painted blue was D9014). In the early 1970s they were fitted with Electric Train Heating (ETH) equipment to power Mark 2 air-conditioned coaches, while a couple of years later, with the introduction of BR's TOPS computer system, they were renumbered 55001 to 55022.

=== Withdrawal ===
In the late 1970s, the Deltics began to take on secondary roles, gradually being supplanted by the next generation of express passenger services, namely the "InterCity 125" High Speed Train (HST) which were introduced on the ECML from 1978. At this time, British Rail had a general policy of not maintaining small non-standard fleets of locomotives, and when the HST fleet took over East Coast mainline services, it was obvious the class had a limited future. Various alternative uses for the fleet were examined, but this came to nothing: A significant weakness of the Deltics was their high running costs, due to the complexity of their engine design which required expensive specialist maintenance, which mitigated against their redeployment elsewhere. In their last years, the Deltics mostly operated the semi-fast services between London and York. They were also used on various popular excursions to areas of the country often far outside their usual operating area, such as Exeter, Bournemouth and Oban.

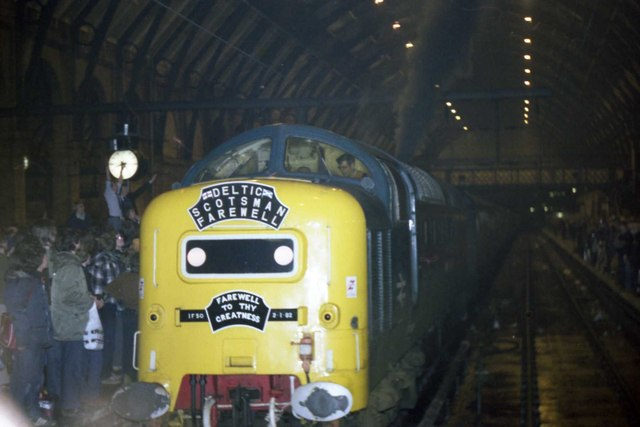
The "Deltic Scotsman Farewell" railtour at King's Cross in 1982

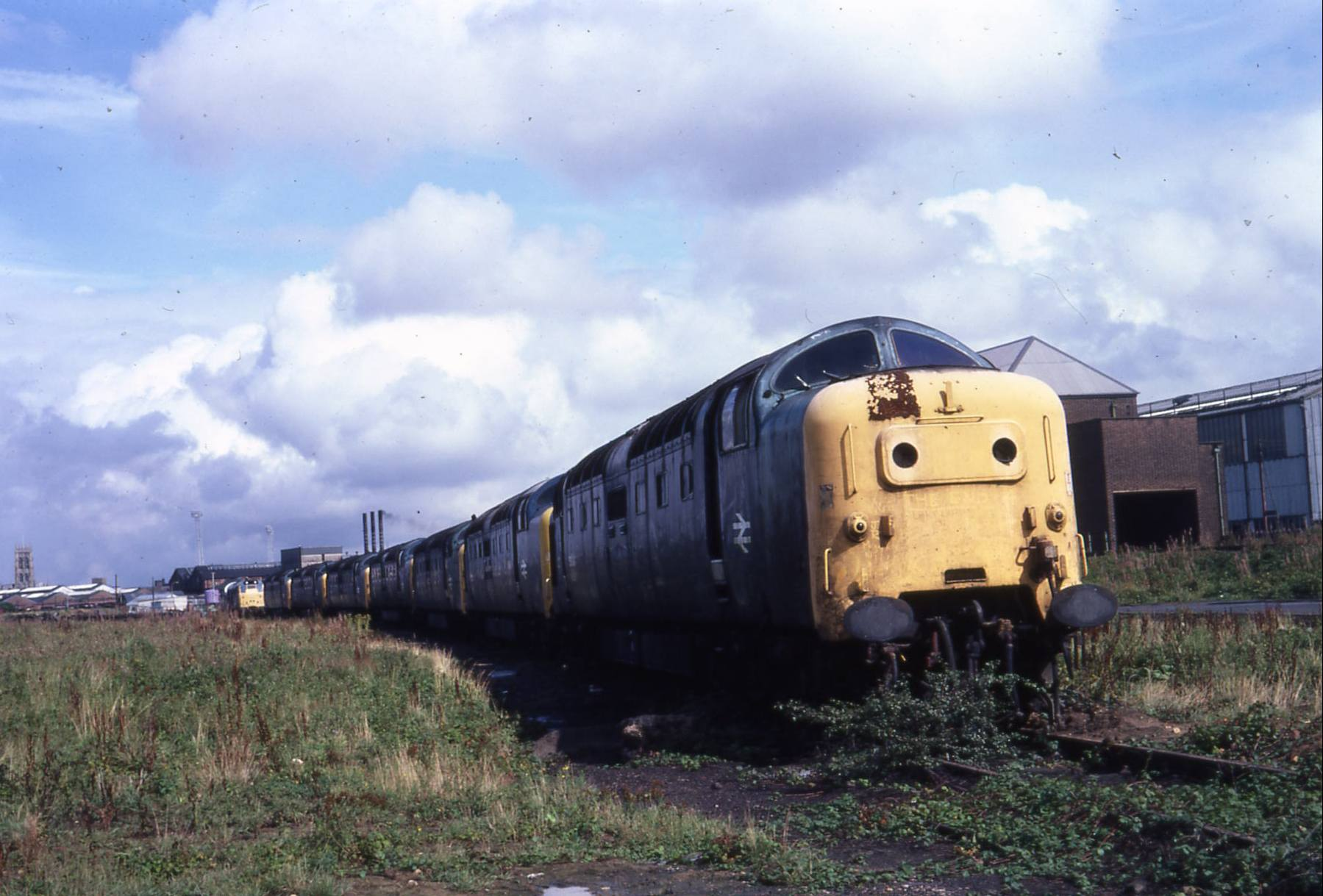
A line of seven withdrawn Deltics at Doncaster Works in 1982

During 1980 and 1981, the fleet was gradually run down; no new spare parts were ordered for the declining fleet, and the locomotives were gradually withdrawn, and then cannibalised for spares to keep the others running. Withdrawn locomotives were taken to Doncaster for stripping and eventual scrapping. For a time the Deltic scrap line was a major draw for railway enthusiasts. In November 1981, the Doncaster Works dismantled its Deltic engine overhaul facility.

The National Railway Museum selected 55002 The King's Own Yorkshire Light Infantry for preservation as part of the National Collection. The Friends of the National Railway Museum sponsored the repaint of 55002 into original green livery for its last eighteen months in traffic, although it carried its TOPS number rather than D9002. As insurance, in case 55002 should meet with a mishap during its last months, the withdrawn 55005 The Prince of Wales's Own Regiment of Yorkshire was set aside from breaking up at Doncaster Works until Deltic operation on the main line had concluded.

The final service train run was the 16:30 Aberdeen–York service on 31 December 1981, hauled from Edinburgh by 55019 Royal Highland Fusilier, arriving in York at just before midnight. The last train was an enthusiast special, the "Deltic Scotsman Farewell", on 2 January 1982, hauled from King's Cross to Edinburgh by 55015 Tulyar and 55022 Royal Scots Grey on the return. Locomotive 55009 Alycidon shadowed the train in both directions between Peterborough and Newcastle, in case of a failure of the train locomotive. Following the farewell, the surviving Deltics were moved to Doncaster Works, where they were displayed en masse in February 1982, before disposal commenced.

Table of withdrawals
Year	Quantity in service at start of year	Quantity withdrawn	Locomotive numbers	Notes
1980	22	3	55001/003/020	
1981	19	16	55002/004-8/010-014/016-019/021	55008 & 021 cabs saved, 55002/016 & 019 preserved
1982	3	3	55009/015/022	All three preserved

=== Accidents and incidents ===
- On 15 December 1961, locomotive D9012 Crepello was hauling an empty stock train when it ran into the rear of a goods train at Conington, Huntingdonshire, during permissive block working. Another goods train then ran into the wreckage, followed a few minutes later by a third goods train.
- On 5 March 1967, locomotive No. 9004 Queen's Own Highlander was hauling a passenger train that overran a signal and was derailed at Conington. Five people were killed and eighteen injured. The signalman had moved a set of points under the train. He was convicted of endangering persons travelling on the railway but was acquitted of manslaughter. He was sentenced to two years' imprisonment.
- On 7 May 1969, locomotive No. 9011 The Royal Northumberland Fusiliers was hauling the Aberdonian which derailed at Morpeth, Northumberland, due to excessive speed on a curve, although 9011 itself remained on the rails. Six people were killed and 46 were injured.
- On 16 February 1977, an express passenger train hauled by 55008 collided with a Class 101 diesel multiple unit operating an empty stock train after failing to stop at Darlington. The guard of the express was slightly injured. The cause of the accident was that the brakes on the carriages had become isolated, in a freak event, whilst the train was moving. The train had struck an object on the track, which had caused a traction motor cover to come loose. This struck the handle of the brake isolating cock, closing it and thus separating the brakes between the locomotive and train. Following the collision, the train was diverted onto the Tees Valley line, where it was brought to a halt by the operation of the communication cord in one of the carriages.

=== Other proposed Deltic locomotives ===
A 72 long tons (73.2 t) Bo-Bo locomotive, using a single 18-cylinder Deltic engine, was proposed as an alternative to what became the British Rail Class 37 Type 3 locomotive introduced from 1960.

A Co-Co "Super Deltic" was proposed but not built. There were three potential designs between 4,000 and 4,600 hp (2,983 and 3,430 kW) weighing between 114 and 119 long tons (116 and 121 t) with a maximum axle load of 19 long tons (19.3 t). The locomotives would have looked very similar to the eventual Class 50s, though slightly longer. All three designs would have had two 18-cylinder turbocharged engines, based on the 9-cylinder turbocharged engine used in the British Rail Class 23 "Baby Deltic" and the locomotive would have been designated Class 51. The Class 55's engines were not turbocharged, although they did have centrifugal scavenging blowers.

== Operations after BR withdrawal ==
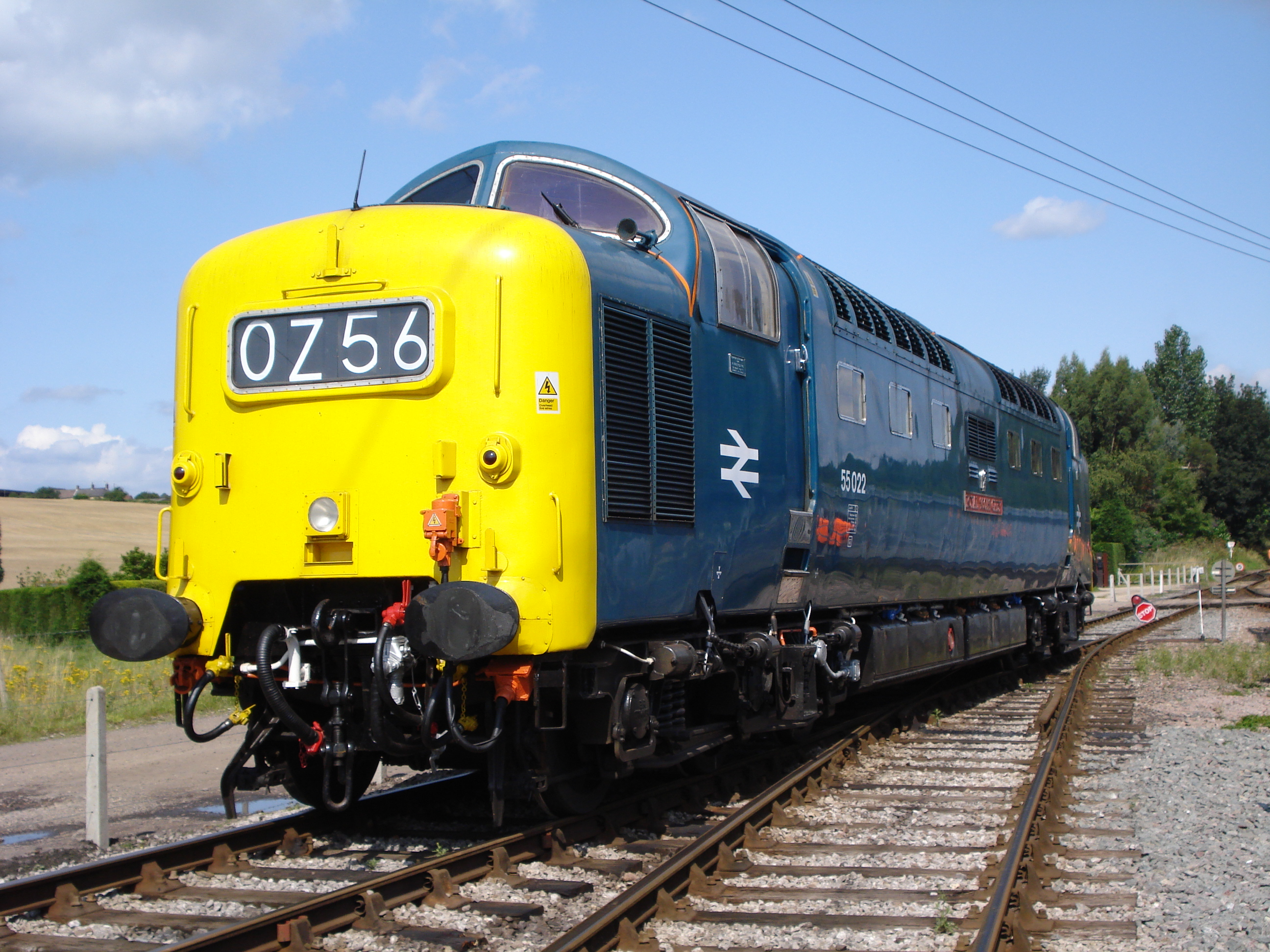
55022 Royal Scots Grey at the Barrow Hill Engine Shed

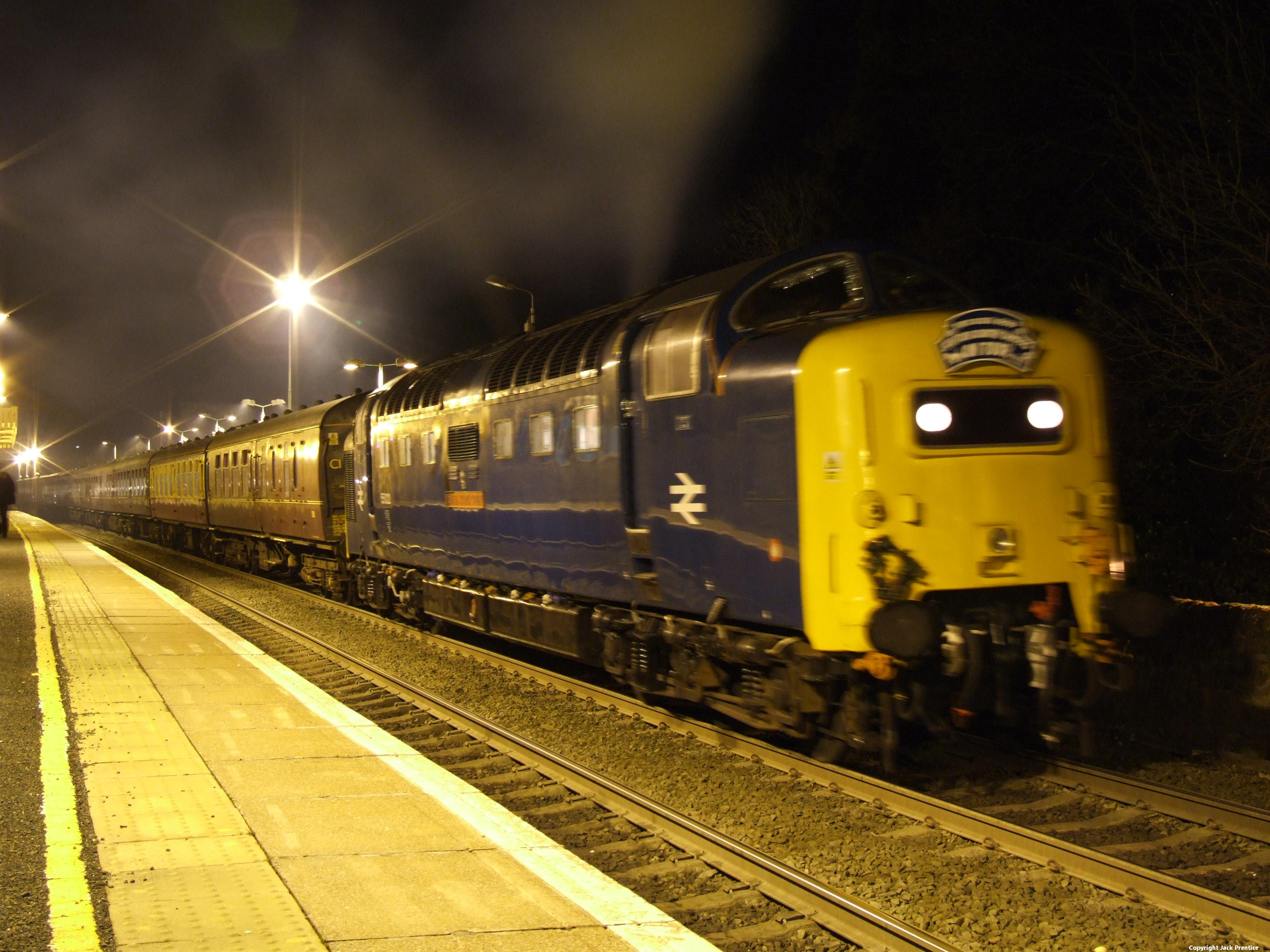
55022 Royal Scots Grey at Linlithgow, after a railtour, in 2007

Despite the ban on privately owned diesel locomotives operating on BR tracks, railway enthusiasts did not have to wait that long after the final withdrawal of the class to see a Deltic back on the mainline. Following participation in the hastily arranged 'Farewell to the Deltics' open day at British Rail Engineering Limited's Doncaster Works on 27 February 1982, 55002 left Doncaster under its own power and ran back up the ECML to the National Railway Museum light engine; it was to be some years before a Deltic was officially allowed to run again on the mainline.

The next opportunity to see a Deltic back on the mainline and running under its own power was in April 1985 when D9000 was sent (at the request of ScotRail management) light engine from Haymarket depot to Perth for an open day. Following newspaper comments by ScotRail's manager Chris Green around that time there was hope that D9000 might see regular work on ScotRail's lines. Chris Green's move to the management team at the newly created Network SouthEast in 1986 put paid to that. However, that did not end his involvement with D9000. He arranged for Network South East depots to provide accommodation for both D9000 and D9016 and when he moved on to head up Virgin Rail Group D9000 was used on summer Saturday Virgin CrossCountry services in the late 1990s.

With the changes taking place on Britain's railways in the 1990s, the outlook changed for preserved diesel locomotives. In British Rail days no privately owned diesel locomotives were allowed to operate on its tracks. With privatisation came open-access railways—the track and infrastructure were owned and operated by Railtrack, who for a fee would allow approved locomotives and trains to operate on their track. Suddenly, the owners of preserved locomotives were on an equal footing with everyone else. In fact, the characteristics of the Deltic locomotives, powerful and capable of cruising at 100 mph (160 km/h), enabled them to fit more easily onto the modern rail network than other, slower, preserved diesels.

In 1996 the Deltic 9000 Fund was incorporated as Deltic 9000 Locomotives Ltd (DNLL) with the objective of returning its locomotives to main-line service and on 30 November 1996 D9000 Royal Scots Grey hauled the 'Deltic Deliverance' charter from Edinburgh to King's Cross. This tour however ended prematurely at Berwick-upon-Tweed after a fire broke out in the loco's engine room. D9000 went on to haul many charter trains and service trains for both Anglia Railways and Virgin CrossCountry until 2003. Subsequently, DNLL's other Deltic, D9016 Gordon Highlander returned to main-line working (it was temporarily painted in a purple and grey livery based upon the house colours of Porterbrook, who helped finance the restoration), as did the Deltic Preservation Society's D9009 Alycidon and 55019 Royal Highland Fusilier. Between 1997 and 2003 all four main-line certified locomotives saw frequent charter and spot hire use, including on the Venice Simplon Orient Express. A highlight of this period was 22 May 1999, when D9000 Royal Scots Grey, D9009 Alycidon and 55019 Royal Highland Fusilier were all in operation on the East Coast Main Line on the same day – D9000 running the "George Mortimer Pullman" British Pullman between London Victoria and Bradford Forster Square and the DPS Deltics working two charter trains between King's Cross and York. On the return run from Bradford, D9000 was held in platform 1 at Doncaster, whilst 55019 passed on the up through line. D9000 then followed 55019 as far as Belle Isle, where it diverged for the run around London to Victoria.

In 2003, DNLL went into liquidation with the result that D9000 and D9016 were sold to private individuals. From July 2003 to March 2005 no Deltics hauled a train on the main line. After a brief return to the main line in 2005 the DPS withdrew their last Deltic (55019) at the end of 2005, having run three tours during the year. D9015 Tulyar is currently undergoing a full overhaul at Barrow Hill, with the aim of main line operation, whilst 55002 The King's Own Yorkshire Light Infantry is currently painted in BR blue, main line certificated, and operates from the National Railway Museum. 55019 remains in full working order along with D9009, whilst D9016 is currently able to operate on one engine only.

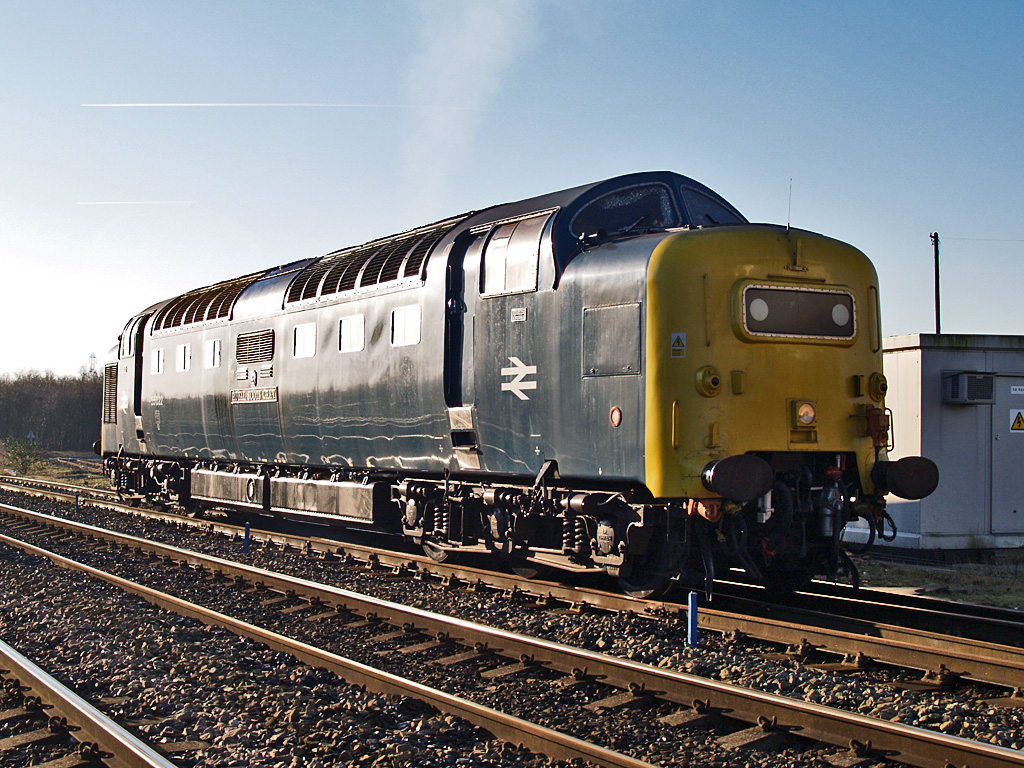
55022 Royal Scots Grey at Castleton East Junction in 2007

On 23 September 2006, 55022 (D9000) Royal Scots Grey returned to the main line after a lengthy and extensive restoration at Barrow Hill, carried out on behalf of the owners by the DPS. It successfully hauled the SRPS 'Moray Mint' railtour from Edinburgh to Inverness, via Perth on the outward trip and back via Aberdeen. On its second working two weeks later, severe damage occurred to the number 2 end engine. The engine suffered from a leg out of bed, a term which means the engine con-rod breaks out of the engine crankcase. This left Royal Scots Grey still able to operate but on one engine only. By January 2007, the faulty power unit was removed from 55022, put into storage and replaced by an ex-marine Napier Deltic engine modified for rail use; work was completed by Royal Scots Grey's restoration team in August 2007. After extensive testing at the East Lancs Railway the locomotive hauled its first tour since the previous engine malfunction on RTC's 'Autumn Highlander' with 50 049 and 40 145 in October 2007. 55022 successfully hauled a number of charter tour services during 2008 but the replacement marine-sourced engine gave rise for concern following the discovery of oil in the coolant and at the end of August the locomotive was removed from future large railtour duties. The locomotive continued working mainline duty by visiting other preserved railway and moving other non-mainline registered locomotives.

In mid January 2007, an agreement was reached between heritage railway Peak Rail and the owner of D9016 Gordon Highlander which entailed the move of the locomotive from Barrow Hill to the preserved line for a period of three years. It had been thought that D9016 would receive certain maintenance and restoration while on the railway. However, the sale of the locomotive to the Harry Needle Railroad Company and subsequent announcements indicated that the weekend runs of 27 and 28 September 2008 might be its last prior to component recovery and eventual scrapping. Despite previous indications to the contrary, HNRC put the locomotive up for sale during the last week of September 2008 and although the Gordon Highlander Preservation Group submitted a substantial bid it was not accepted and the immediate future (and owner) of the locomotive was shrouded in some mystery.

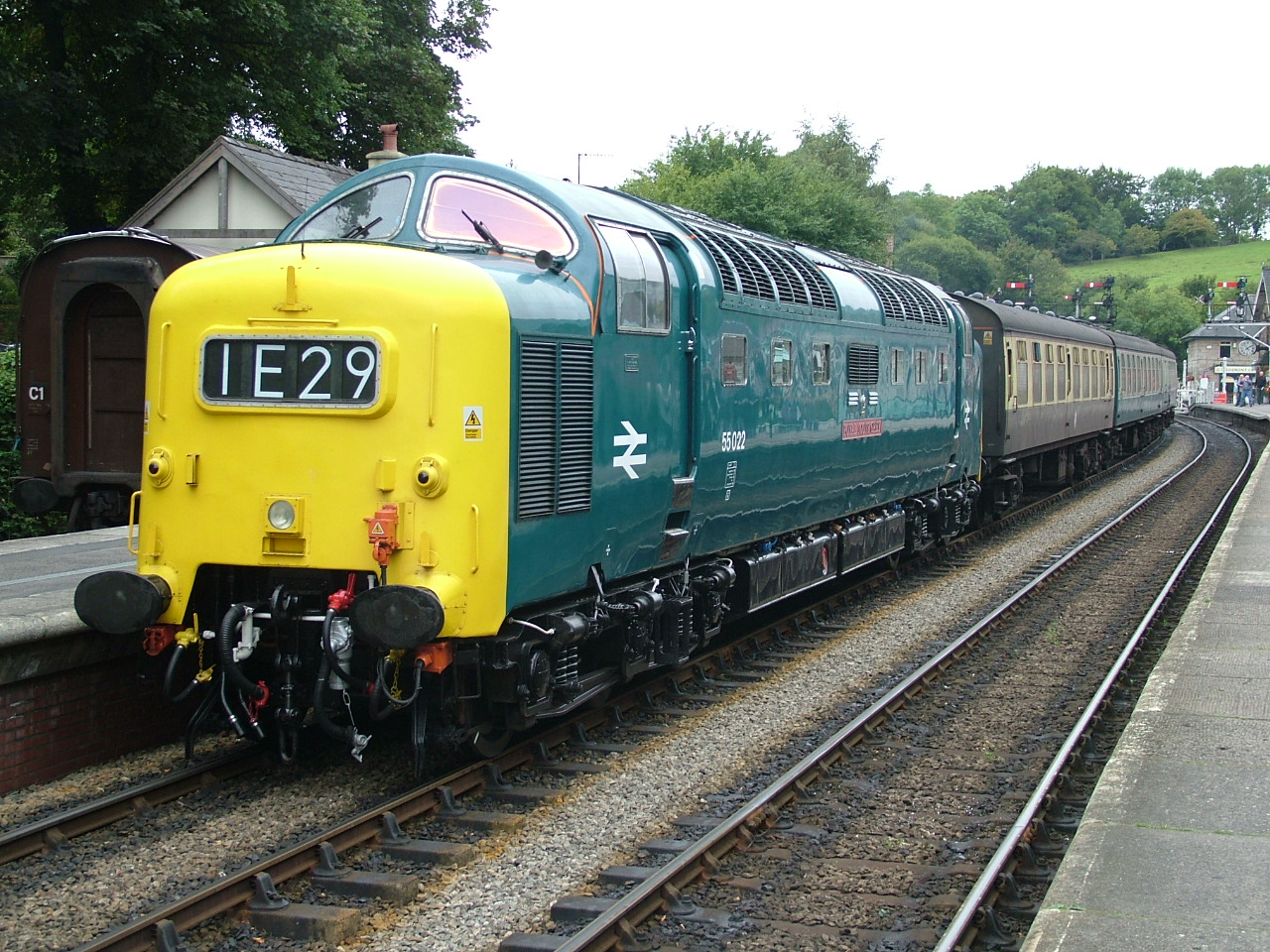
55022 Royal Scots Grey is seen in Grosmont station, shortly after arrival from Pickering, during the NYMR's annual Diesel Gala in 2009

Subsequently, in October 2008, DRS announced in a press release that it had acquired D9016 Gordon Highlander from Harry Needle Railroad Company (HNRC): "The company is working with HNRC to return the locomotive to operational condition, although at the time of writing (June 2009) the locomotive is still stored at Barrow Hill awaiting attention. While the locomotive is not planned for an immediate return to service, DRS is confident that the locomotive will be returned to mainline service in the future. DRS intends to retain the locomotive's name". On 29 December 2009, it was announced that D9016 had been purchased by Beaver Sports (Yorks) Limited. It has subsequently operated (on one engine) on the East Lancashire Railway and the Great Central Railway, pending work to restore it to full working order.

In April 2011, 55022 was hired in by GB Railfreight for bauxite freight working between North Blyth and the Lynemouth aluminium smelter. This hire was scheduled to last from April to July. From May 2013 to November 2015, 55022 was chartered by GBRF to transfer First ScotRail EMU's for refurbishment. These included the entire fleet of Class 334s, which were moved between Yoker and Kilmarnock. The route taken, partially to prevent false fire alarms in underground tunnels caused by the Deltic engine's emissions, takes the train as far as Craigendoran on the north bank of the Clyde before turning round toward Kilmarnock.

On 29 November 2017 it was announced via the official Royal Scots Grey website that 55022 and D9016, plus all spares, had been sold by Martin Walker to Locomotive Services Limited, with both making the trip to LSL's Crewe Diesel TMD base in December 2017. It is intended that both locomotives will ultimately be repaired (55022 currently has engine problems and D9016 is coming to the end of bodywork repairs) and operated on the mainline alongside Hosking's sizable locomotive fleet. By June 2018, 55022 was under repair while D9016 had been placed in store and was transferred, cosmetically restored, to Locomotive Storage Limited's facility at Margate.

=== Deltic Preservation Society ===

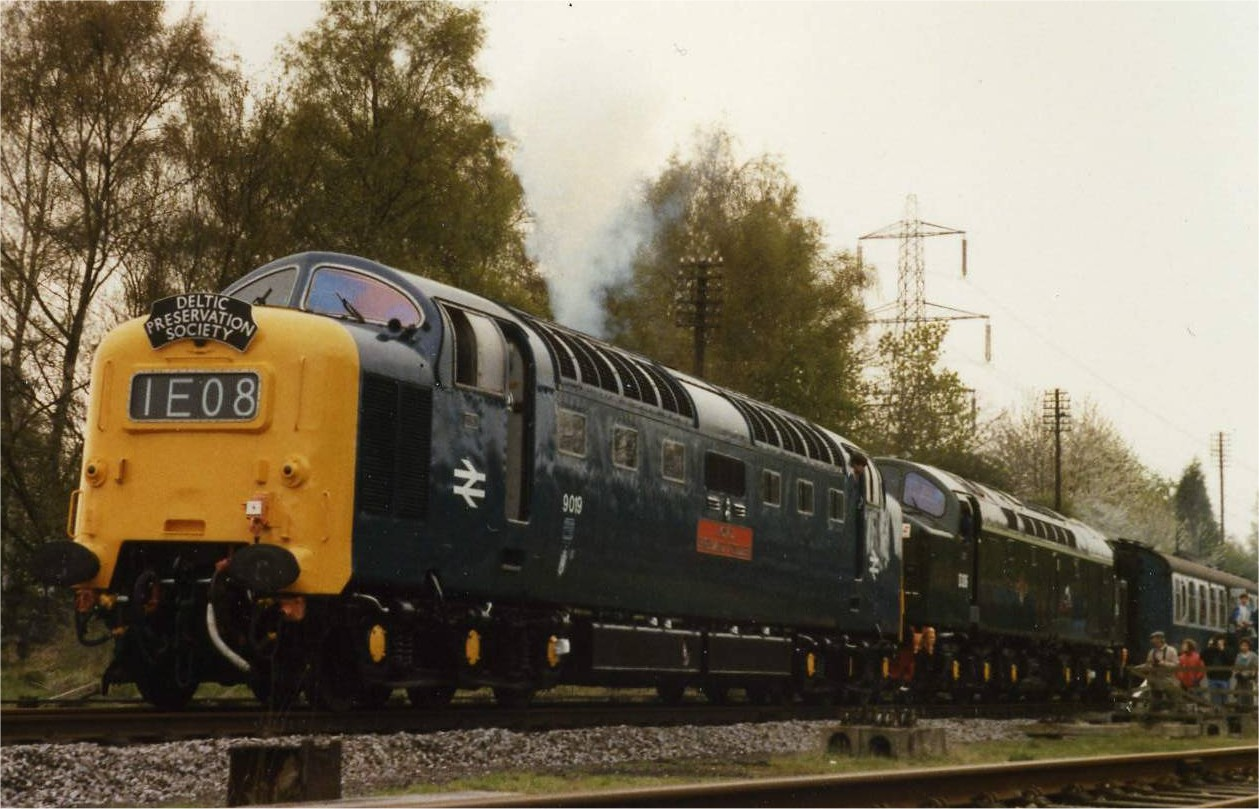
- Franchise: Railtour Operator
- Fleet: 3 British Rail Class 55s

Other
- Website: thedps.co.uk

The Deltic Preservation Society (DPS) was founded in 1977 following the entry into service of the Class 43 High Speed Train. A group of Class 55 enthusiasts made the decision to join together to ensure that a working locomotive was kept running, forming the DPS to raise funds to this end. By 1982, when the Class 55 was withdrawn, the Society numbered over 1,500, with the result that it was able to purchase two locomotives, D9009/55009 (Alycidon) and D9019/55019 (Royal Highland Fusilier), from British Rail. These two units were moved immediately from Doncaster Works and put into service on the North Yorkshire Moors Railway. A third locomotive, D9015/55015 (Tulyar) was added to the inventory in 1986 when it was purchased from a private owner.

For the first few years, the DPS provided its locomotives to run on a number of private railways. However, following a change of policy by British Rail in 1991, a few years before its privatisation, it became possible for private operators to run trains on the mainline rail network. With this in mind, the DPS sent Alycidon for a major overhaul, completed in 1998, which allowed the locomotive to gain a certification for running on the public railway. Royal Highland Fusilier was given a less extensive overhaul, receiving its certification at the same time. Both locomotives re-entered passenger service in May 1999, operating railtour services for the Society. At the same time, both were also used on many occasions by Venice-Simplon Orient Express to haul the Northern Belle charter train. In 1997, Tulyar was withdrawn from its private railway services and sent for an overhaul along the same lines as Alycidon to restore it to mainline service.

D9000/55022 Royal Scots Grey is a further preserved Class 55. Along with D9016/55016 Gordon Highlander, she was purchased by the Deltic 9000 Fund on withdrawal from British Rail service, and operated for several years on charters and railtours. In 2004, DNLL went into liquidation, with its locomotives sold. Royal Scots Grey was purchased by DPS member Martin Walker to be operated as a chartered locomotive for railtour operators. In 2009 Walker purchased Gordon Highlander reuniting the two locomotives. The two locomotives ran at the East Lancashire Railway for many years but have now left for other railways. In December 2017, both were sold to Locomotive Services.

==== Operations ====
Under the name "DPS Railtours", the DPS operated railtours pulled by its Class 55 locomotives. It has also provided its locomotives to other railtour operators for their services. In addition, under the name DPS Commercial Services, the DPS operates a depot at Barrow Hill near Chesterfield, where it contracts out to perform maintenance and repairs not only its own locomotives, but also the other preserved Class 55s, D9002/55002 (King's Own Yorkshire Light Infantry) (owned by the National Railway Museum) and D9000/55022 (Royal Scots Grey).

In addition, the DPS also owns a preserved cab of D9008/55008 (The Green Howards), which has been converted into a simulator for the Trainz East Coast Main Line computer program. In August 2006, the DPS also obtained the cab of D9021/55021 (Argyll and Sutherland Highlander), which it intends to restore and put on display at its depot; however, the cab has now left the DPS depot and is now part of The South Wales Loco Cab Preservation Group.

== Preservation ==
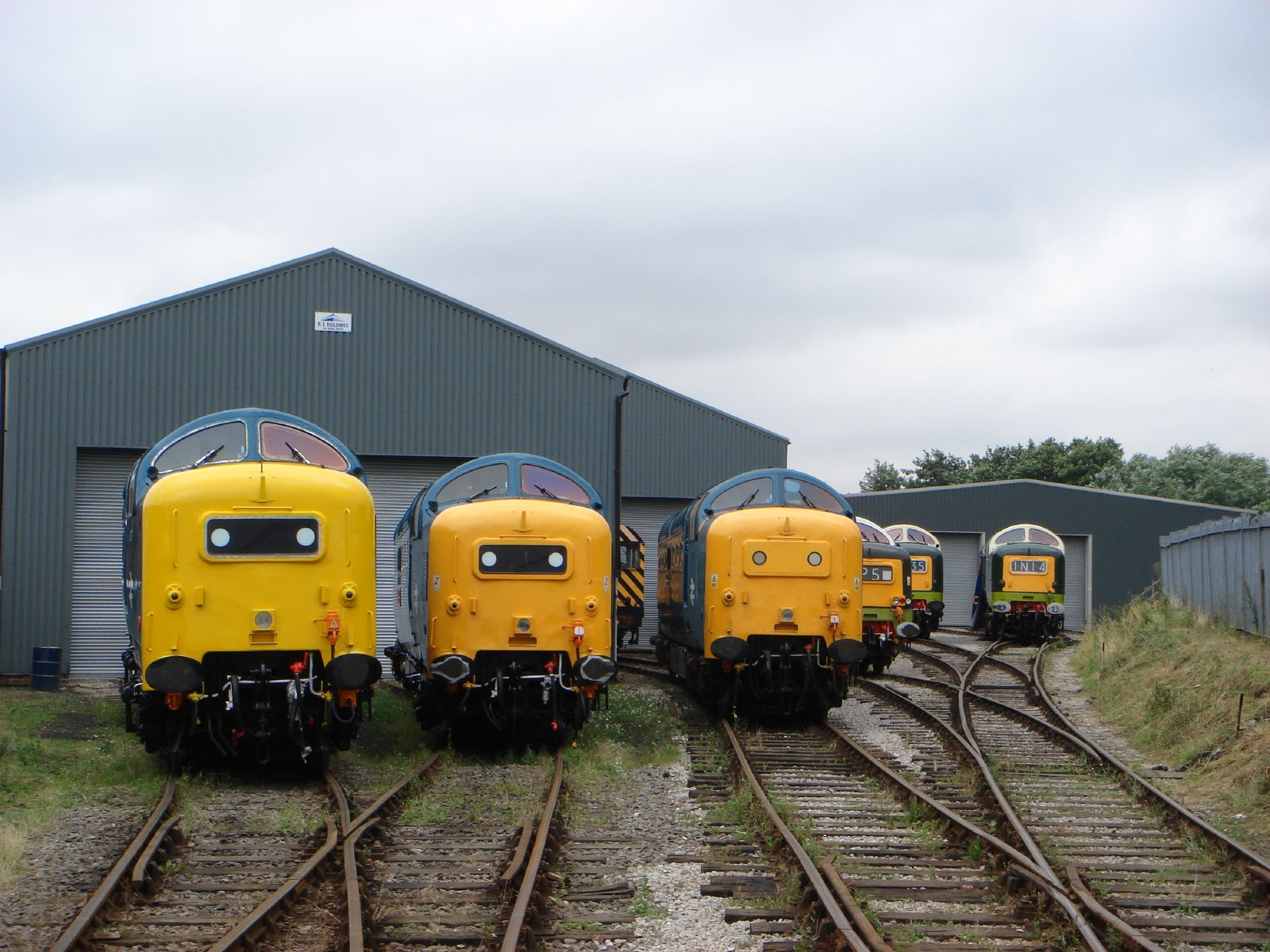
All six preserved Deltics at Barrow Hill in 2006

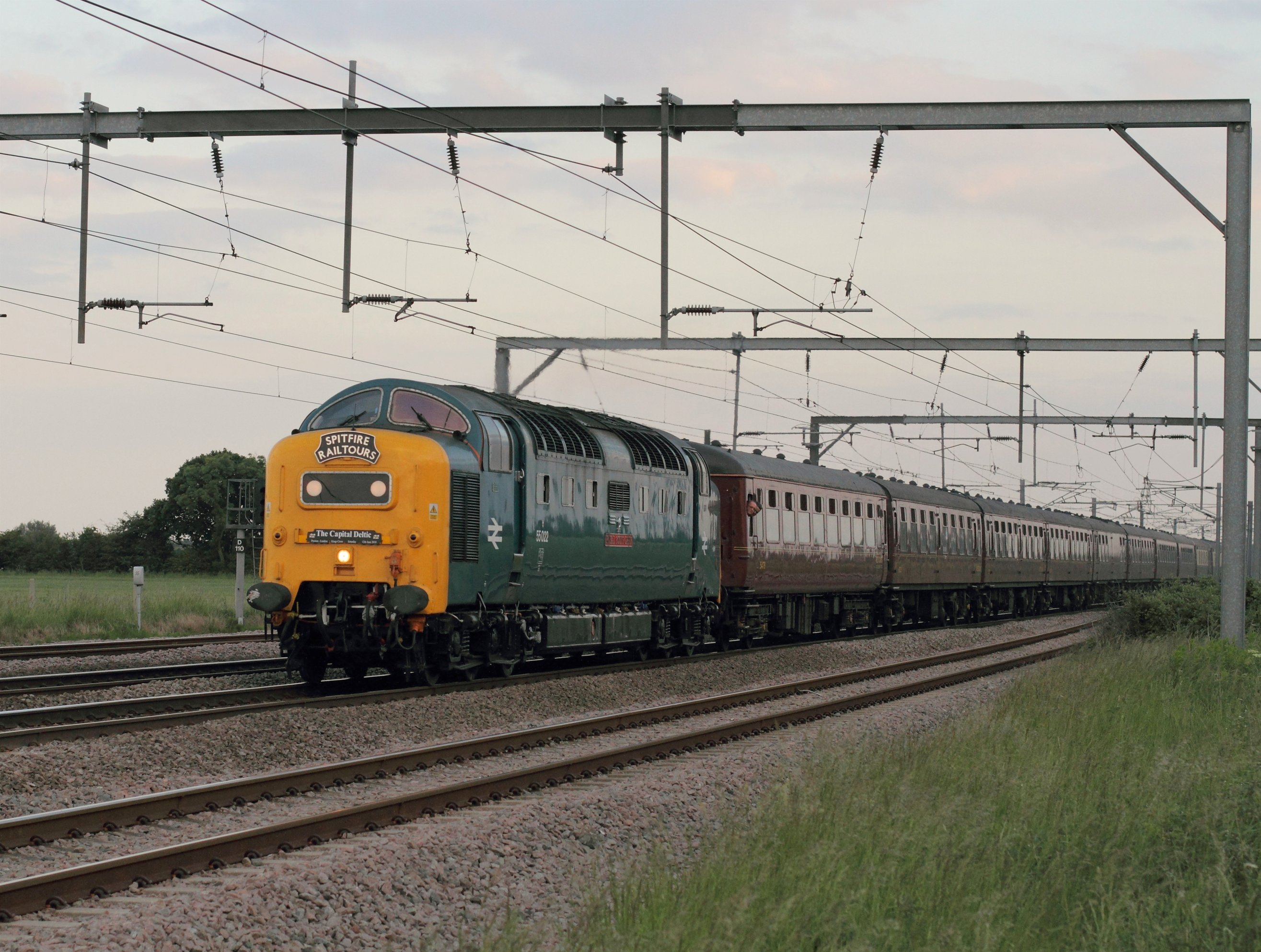
55022 Royal Scots Grey passes Carlton-on-Trent in 2010 with an Oxford-Preston charter

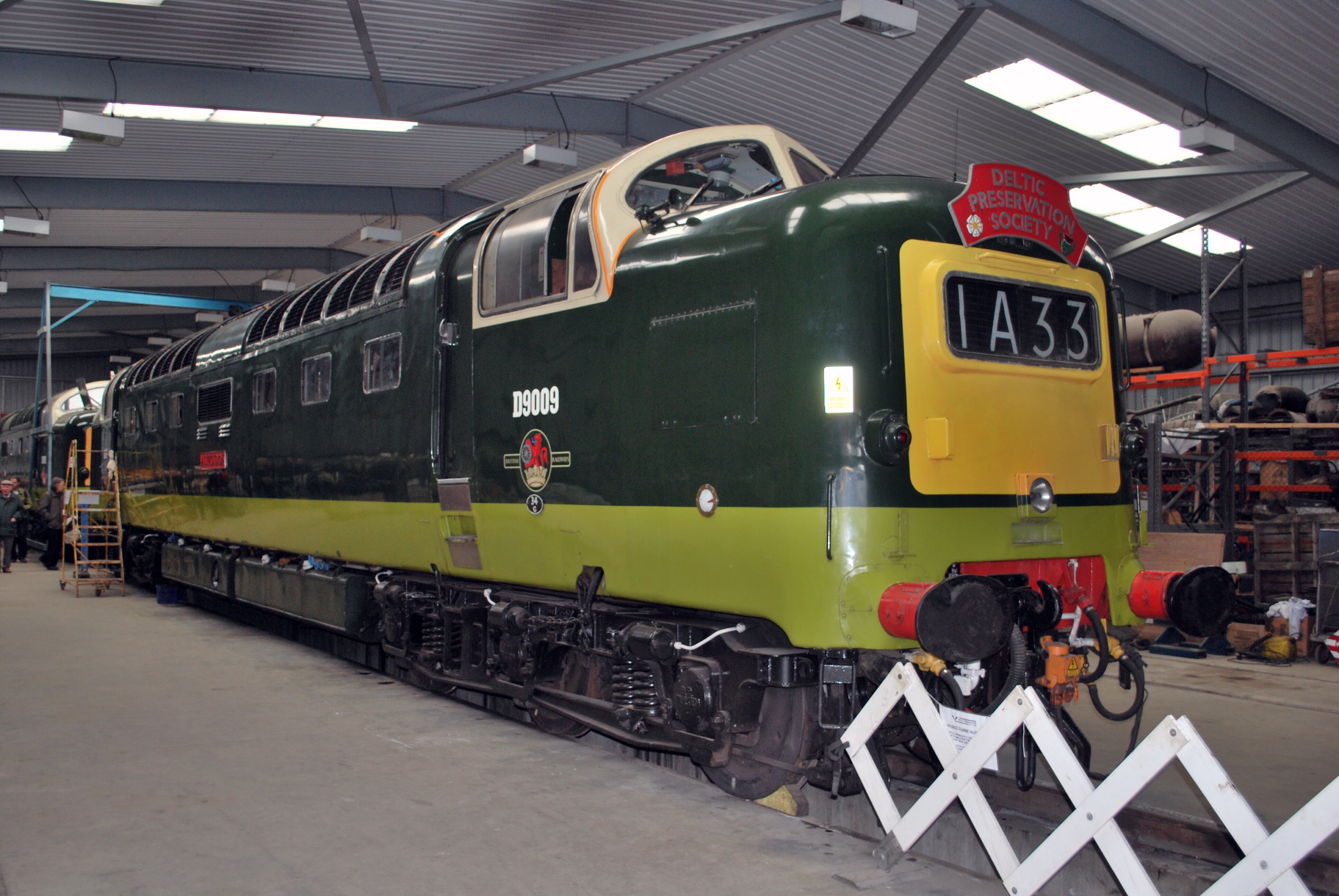
D9009 Alycidon (later 55009) in BR green livery on display at Barrow Hill Roundhouse in 2012

Six locomotives survive; all have run in preservation and all have operated on the mainline, although 55015 only ran on the mainline at the Rocket 150 event in 1980. Two cabs are also preserved.

Current loco numbers are indicated in bold.

Number (pre-tops)	Number (post-tops)	Image	Name	Built	Withdrawn	Livery	Home Base	Status	Notes
D9000	**55022**		Royal Scots Grey	28 Feb 1961	2 Jan 1982	BR Green	Crewe Diesel TMD	Operational. Mainline certified	Recently acquired from former owners alongside 55016 for use on mainline railtours.
**D9002**	55002		The King's Own Yorkshire Light Infantry	19 Mar 1961	2 Jan 1982	BR Green	National Railway Museum	Static display	
**D9008**	55008		The Green Howards	7 Jul 1961	31 Dec 1981	Green Undercoat	Barrow Hill Roundhouse	Cab only	Owned by the Deltic Preservation Society. Cab has since been extended by 5 ft with a working diagram of a Napier Deltic engine's pistons.
D9009	**55009**		Alycidon	21 Jul 1961	2 Jan 1982	BR Blue	Barrow Hill Roundhouse	Testing, Mainline certified	Owned by the Deltic Preservation Society.
**D9015**	55015		Tulyar	13 Oct 1961	2 Jan 1982	BR Green	Barrow Hill Roundhouse	Restoration Complete (testing underway)	Owned by the Deltic Preservation Society.
**D9016**	55016		Gordon Highlander	27 Oct 1961	31 Dec 1981	BR Green	Margate	Static display	Recently acquired from former owners alongside 55022 for use on mainline railtours. Shares its name with LNER Class D40 No. 49 "Gordon Highlander". Undergone a cosmetic makeover and selected parts removed for use on 55022. Now on display at LSL's future museum in Margate awaiting an overhaul, with ex-marine engines and new traction motors.
D9019	**55019**		Royal Highland Fusilier	11 Dec 1961	31 Dec 1981	BR Blue	Barrow Hill Roundhouse	Operational	Owned by the Deltic Preservation Society.
D9021	**55021**		Argyll & Sutherland Highlander	16 Mar 1962	31 Dec 1981	BR Blue	N/A	Cab only	Owned by The South Wales Loco Cab Preservation Group

=== Loco details ===
- **D9000 (55022) Royal Scots Grey** was purchased by the Deltic 9000 Fund and, on 7 September 1983, was handed over in fully running condition after work and a repaint by BR. Its first base was the Nene Valley Railway. It was later accommodated by Network SouthEast at Selhurst and Old Oak Common depots, from where it regularly travelled to open days around the country. In 1996 it was overhauled by Railcare at St. Rollox railway works, Glasgow and received main-line certification. The Deltic 9000 Fund became a limited company (Deltic 9000 Locomotives Limited) and both D9000 and D9016 passed into its care. Its initial return to service, on the "Deltic Deliverance" charter, on 30 November 1996, was cut short by an exhaust stack fire (a regular Deltic problem in service days). Following rectification work at Springburn it ran to King's Cross on an empty stock train before resuming its second main-line career on 2 January 1997 on the "Deltic Reunion" charter to Hull and Harrogate, during which it visited the turntable within the National Railway Museum, where it stood alongside the prototype. It continued to work main line charter trains between 1997 and 2002 and was hired by both Anglia Railways and Virgin CrossCountry to operate service trains on their behalf, as cover for their locomotives.
  Following the demise of Deltic 9000 Locomotives Limited in 2004 the locomotive was sold to Beaver Sports (Yorks) Ltd. It completed an 18-month overhaul and was re-certified for running on the main line in August 2006. Royal Scots Grey has been repainted into blue livery, carrying the markings of York (YK depot) and York City coat of arms crests above the numbers, as done in 1981. It is the first Class 55 to carry the York coat of arms crest since 1982. The locomotive continues to work charters and to be available for spot hire to national operators. In 2015 the locomotive was repainted with 'Finsbury Park-style' white cab window surrounds and at various times has carried the identities of scrapped sister locomotives 55003 Meld, 55007 Pinza and 55018 Ballymoss. 55022 alongside classmate 55016 were later purchased by Locomotive Services Limited and since arriving at Crewe 55022 has been undergoing an overhaul to return to the mainline hauling railtours for Locomotive Services Limited and its new charter train operator "Saphos Trains". Parts from 55016 are being used in the engine's overhaul while the latter engine is on static display in Margate.
- **D9002 (55002) The King's Own Yorkshire Light Infantry** was donated to the National Railway Museum, York and was the first preserved Deltic to return to the main line when it worked light engine to York after participating in the Doncaster Works Open Day on 27 February 1982. 55002 is one of three Deltics to hold mainline certification (along with D9000 Royal Scots Grey and D9009 Alycidon). 55002 is rarely used on mainline charters and is mostly used to haul locomotives belonging to the National Railway Museum either between their two sites at York and Shildon or to other destinations such as Barrow Hill Engine Shed.
- **D9009 (55009) Alycidon** was purchased by the Deltic Preservation Society (DPS). It was initially based at the North York Moors Railway before undergoing an extensive overhaul and restoration and recertification for main-line use. Following the DPS withdrawal from main-line operations it was mostly based at the DPS depot at Barrow Hill. It was recertified for mainline use in July 2012 after a long absence stretching back to 2003. On 3 March 2019, 55009 was hauling the 'Auld Reekie' from Edinburgh – Doncaster where all 6 traction motors flashed over. 55009 has not worked since and was hauled back to Burton by British Rail Class 67 67004. 55009 is now at the Great Central Railway (heritage railway) for testing following extensive repairs.
- **D9015 (55015) Tulyar** was purchased by a private buyer, Peter Sansom; in 1986 it was sold on to the Deltic Preservation Society. It has led a nomadic existence on many preserved railways and was the favoured DPS locomotive for open days during the 1990s (where it was sometimes presented in the guise of a scrapped sister locomotive, for example during 1994 when it appeared at various events numbered and named as 55001 St Paddy. It is currently under major overhaul at the Deltic Preservation Society depot at Barrow Hill.
- **D9016 (55016) Gordon Highlander** was purchased by the Deltic 9000 Fund, with the intention that it would be restored to running condition, whilst acting as a 'twelve wheeled mobile source of spares'. It was moved to Wansford, on the Nene Valley Railway to join D9000. Eventually, like D9000, the locomotive left the railway for the Network SouthEast depots at Selhurst and Old Oak Common. After D9000 had been operating on the main line for three years the decision was made to overhaul and recertify D9016, to provide cover for Royal Scots Grey, and the locomotive was moved to Brush Traction at Loughborough. Following overhaul it spent a short period on the main line, on charter work, its operation sponsored by Porterbrook, in recognition of which it was painted in their purple and grey house colours, based upon the original two-tone green style. It lasted in this livery until 2002, when the original two-tone green livery was reapplied. Following the demise of Deltic 9000 Locomotives Limited the locomotive was purchased and based at the Peak Rail (Heritage Railway), near Bakewell, Derbyshire. In July 2008, this locomotive was sold by the private owner to Harry Needle Railroad Company (HNRC). Despite previous announcements to the contrary, HNRC put the locomotive up for sale at the end of September 2008. Bids from the Gordon Highlander Preservation Group and Beaver Sports (Yorks) Ltd. (the owners of 55022) were rejected by HNRC in favour of a higher offer from Direct Rail Services who kept D9016 at Barrow Hill for a year with the intention of a full overhaul but these plans never surfaced. The locomotive was sold one year later to Beaver Sports (Yorks) Ltd. and it was based at East Lancashire Railway with 55022.
  The aim was to return D9016 to mainline condition once again. D9016 donated one of its two engines to 55022 in April 2010 to replace one of 55022's engines, a former marine example that had been temporarily fitted to 55022 following an earlier engine failure. During 2014 D9016 left the East Lancashire Railway for the Great Central Railway. In January 2015 the locomotive moved to the Washwood Heath site of Boden Rail, for bodywork repairs. D9016, along with classmate 55022, were later purchased by Locomotive Services Limited. D9016 required a cosmetic overhaul, owing to damaged areas. With the main intention being to return 55022 to service first parts were taken off D9016 for use on 55022 and after being given a cosmetic touchup. 16 was returned to its original BR Green with its pre-TOPS number, D9016. The engine would later be moved to Margate for static display at LSL's new museum at the Hornby factory.
- **D9019 (55019) Royal Highland Fusilier** was purchased by the Deltic Preservation Society. Initially based at the North York Moors Railway, along with 55009, the locomotive subsequently moved and spent several years at both the Great Central Railway and the East Lancashire Railway. It is now based at the Deltic Preservation Society depot at Barrow Hill. In April 2005 it became the first Deltic to be fitted with TPWS equipment.

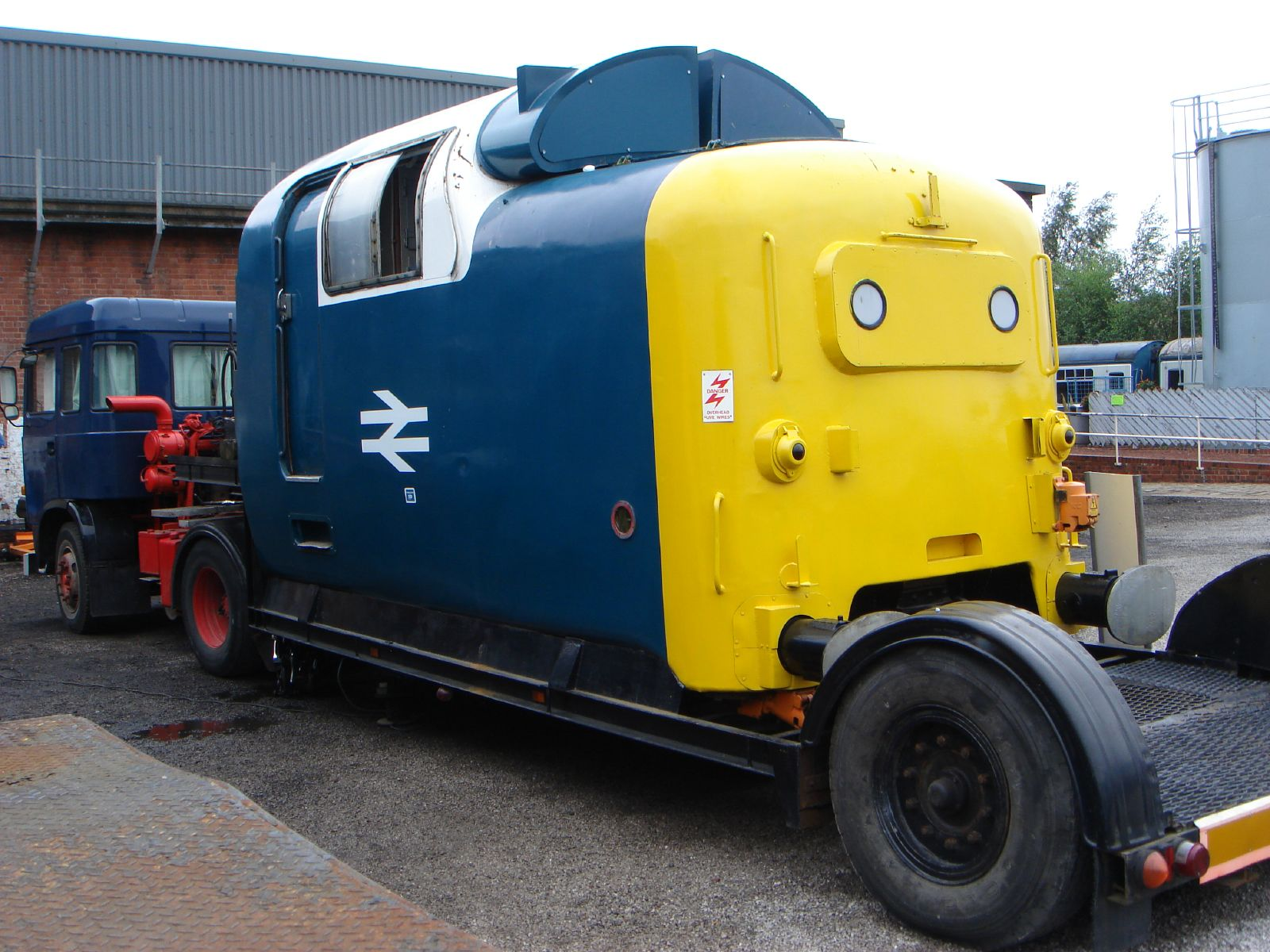
D9008 (55008) The Green Howards Simulator cab

Two cabs were saved after withdrawal:

- One cab from **D9008 (55008) The Green Howards** was acquired when the locomotive was being scrapped at Doncaster Works in August 1982. Locomotive 55008 is mounted on a road trailer and has been fitted out with computer simulation equipment which allows anybody to take the controls. In October 2003, the cab was painted to masquerade as British Rail DP2.
- One cab from **D9021 (55021) Argyll & Sutherland Highlander** was acquired when the locomotive was scrapped at Doncaster Works in September 1982. It was privately purchased and positioned within sight of the Great Western Main Line at South Stoke, west of Reading. It was later sold to another private owner before being purchased by the Deltic Preservation Society. It has subsequently been sold on to the South Wales Loco Cab Preservation Group.

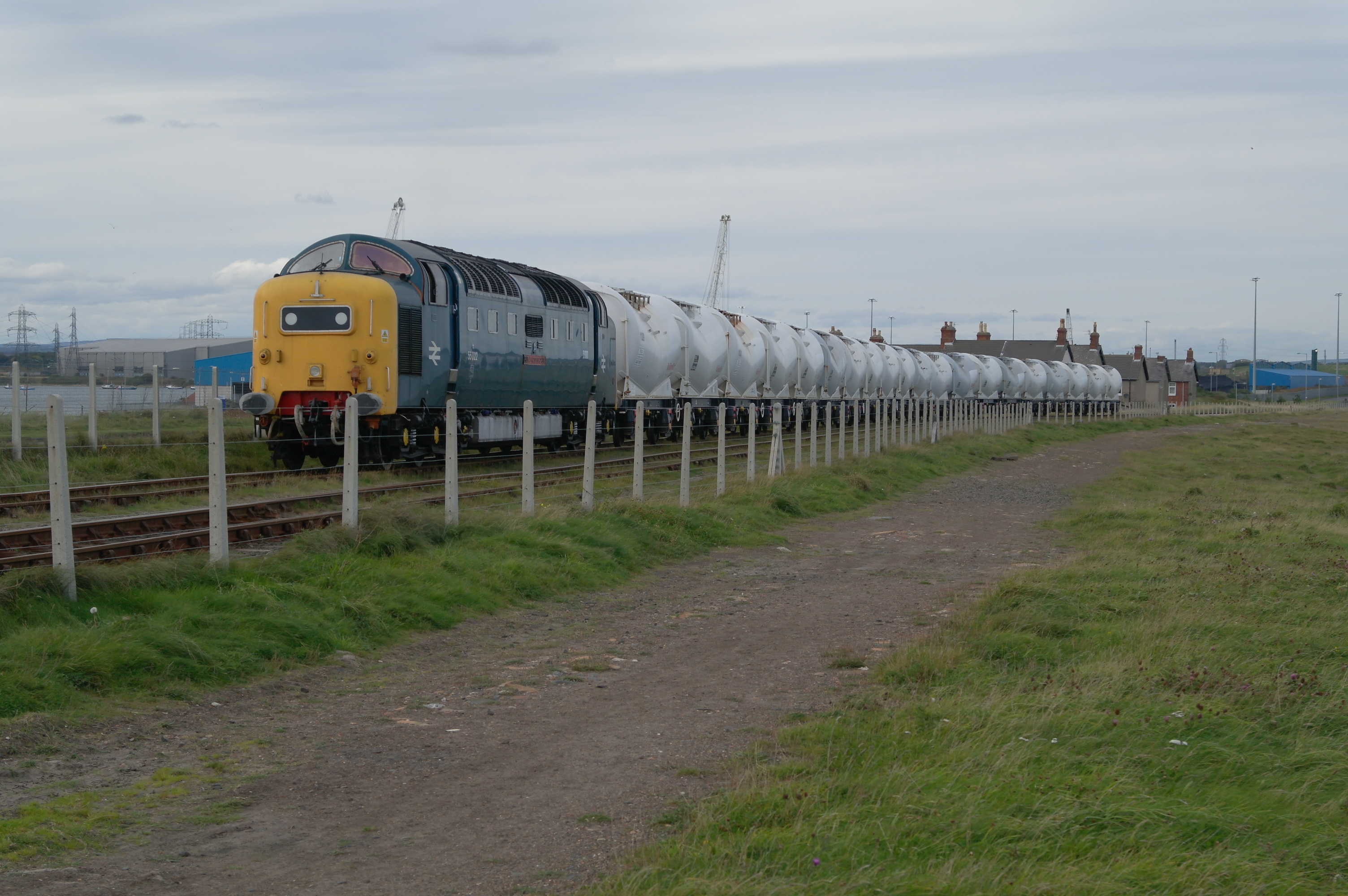
55022 arrives at North Blyth in 2011 with a train of aluminium oxide wagons.

== Fleet details ==
Key:	Preserved	Cab only	Scrapped

Original Number	TOPS number	Name	Built	Depot	Withdrawn	Status
D9000	55022	Royal Scots Grey	28 February 1961	Haymarket	2 January 1982	Preserved by Locomotive Services Limited – Under Repair.
D9001	55001	St Paddy	23 February 1961	Finsbury Park	5 January 1980	Scrapped BREL Doncaster February 1980.
D9002	55002	The King's Own Yorkshire Light Infantry	19 March 1961	Gateshead	31 December 1981	Preserved by the National Railway Museum – Static Display.
D9003	55003	Meld	27 March 1961	Finsbury Park	31 December 1980	Scrapped BREL Doncaster March 1981.
D9004	55004	Queen's Own Highlander	10 May 1961	Haymarket	28 October 1981	Scrapped BREL Doncaster August 1983.
D9005	55005	The Prince of Wales's Own Regiment of Yorkshire	25 May 1961	Gateshead	8 February 1981	Scrapped BREL Doncaster February 1983.
D9006	55006	The Fife & Forfar Yeomanry	29 June 1961	Haymarket	8 February 1981	Scrapped BREL Doncaster July 1981.
D9007	55007	Pinza	22 June 1961	Finsbury Park	31 December 1981	Scrapped BREL Doncaster August 1982.
D9008	55008	The Green Howards	7 July 1961	Gateshead	31 December 1981	Scrapped BREL Doncaster August 1982. (One cab preserved and used as simulator.)
D9009	55009	Alycidon	21 July 1961	Finsbury Park	2 January 1982	Preserved – Under Repair, Mainline Registered
D9010	55010	The King's Own Scottish Borderer	21 July 1961	Haymarket	24 December 1981	Scrapped BREL Doncaster May 1982.
D9011	55011	The Royal Northumberland Fusiliers	24 August 1961	Gateshead	8 November 1981	Scrapped BREL Doncaster November 1982.
D9012	55012	Crepello	4 September 1961	Finsbury Park	18 May 1981	Scrapped BREL Doncaster September 1981.
D9013	55013	The Black Watch	14 September 1961	Haymarket	20 December 1981	Scrapped BREL Doncaster December 1982.
D9014	55014	The Duke of Wellington's Regiment	29 September 1961	Gateshead	22 November 1981	Scrapped BREL Doncaster February 1982.
D9015	55015	Tulyar	13 October 1961	Finsbury Park	2 January 1982	Preserved – undergoing major overhaul
D9016	55016	Gordon Highlander	27 October 1961	Haymarket	30 December 1981	Preserved by Locomotive Services Limited – Static Display.
D9017	55017	The Durham Light Infantry	9 November 1961	Gateshead	31 December 1981	Scrapped BREL Doncaster January 1983.
D9018	55018	Ballymoss	24 November 1961	Finsbury Park	12 October 1981	Scrapped BREL Doncaster January 1982.
D9019	55019	Royal Highland Fusilier	11 December 1961	Haymarket	31 December 1981	Preserved – Operational, Mainline Registered.
D9020	55020	Nimbus	12 February 1962	Finsbury Park	5 January 1980	Scrapped BREL Doncaster January 1980.
D9021	55021	Argyll & Sutherland Highlander	16 March 1962	Haymarket	31 December 1981	Scrapped BREL Doncaster August 1982. (One cab preserved.)

=== Scale models ===
The first OO gauge model was produced by Hornby Dublo in two versions. D9012 "Crepello" was the two-rail version and D9001 "St Paddy" was the three-rail version. The second OO gauge model was produced by Lima, in two versions initially: D9003 "Meld" in BR Green; and 9006 "The Fife & Forfar Yeomanry" in BR Blue. The same models were also released in N gauge (1:160 scale), however these did not last very long, as Lima eventually decided to concentrate its British outline output on OO gauge.

Bachmann have since released a new version of the "Deltic", in both the OO gauge "Branchline" range and their N gauge "Graham Farish" range. Bachmann have also produced the "Deltic Prototype" in OO gauge (previously only available as a plastic kit from either Kitmaster or Dapol), however this had been commissioned by Locomotion Models – the model railways arm of the National Railway Museum – and was not generally available in model shops. A "Graham Farish" N gauge model is available, as a stand-alone model, and as part of the "Merseyside Express" train set.

In 2012 Hornby Railways launched a version of the BR Class 55, which is basic representation of the prototype as part of their Railroad range in BR Blue and BR Green in OO gauge. This model was essentially the old Lima tooling with a new chassis.

Accurascale announced a new range of OO gauge "Deltics", in a wide variety of liveries, which were released in summer 2022.

In February 2023 Hornby announced a new diecast Dublo tooling in OO gauge of the Deltic prototype locomotive, English Electric DP1 'Deltic', fitted with sound (R30297TXS).

== See also ==
- British Rail DP2 – prototype locomotive, built 1962, which used a Deltic bodyshell, but had a different engine.

== References and sources ==
=== Sources ===
- Allen, Cecil J.; et al. (1972). The Deltics : a symposium. Allan. ISBN 0-7110-0322-X.
- Chamberlin, R. H. (1963). "Paper 3: The Napier Deltic Diesel Engine in Main-Line Locomotives". Proceedings of the Institution of Mechanical Engineers, Conference Proceedings. 178 (311): 53–73. doi:10.1243/PIME_CONF_1963_178_299_02.
- Nock, O.S. (1985). British Locomotives of the 20th Century: Volume 3 1960-the present day. London: Guild Publishing/Book Club Associates. p. 75. CN9613.
- Stevens-Stratten, S.W.; Carter, R.S. (1978). British Rail Main-Line Diesels. Shepperton: Ian Allan Publishing. ISBN 0-7110-0617-2.
- Webb, Brian (1982). The Deltic Locomotives of British Rail. Newton Abbot: David & Charles. ISBN 0-7153-8110-5.
- Webb, Brian (1976). English Electric Main Line Diesel Locomotives of British Rail. Newton Abbot: David & Charles. ISBN 0-7153-7158-4.
