= Deltic 9000 Fund =

The Deltic 9000 Fund was a locomotive preservation society set up to ensure that at least one example of the British Rail Class 55 diesel locomotives was preserved following their withdrawal from service in 1981. It was placed in receivership in 2004.

== Formation ==
With the entry into service of the new High Speed Train in the late 1970s, the old Class 55 diesel locomotives began to be withdrawn. In order to ensure that the first production unit, D9000/55022 (Royal Scots Grey), was preserved, the Deltic 9000 Fund was established with the intention of purchasing the locomotive once it was withdrawn. The successful purchase was completed in 1983, and Royal Scots Grey was handed over to the fund at Doncaster Works, from where she was taken to the Nene Valley Railway for preservation. At the same time, D9016/55016 (Gordon Highlander) was also purchased by the fund. Gordon Highlander was intended to be used as a source of spares for Royal Scots Grey, but, with sentiment taking over, she too was restored to working order.

== Deltic 9000 Locomotives Ltd ==
The privatisation of British Rail allowed private train operators to run services on the mainline. With this in mind, the Deltic 9000 Fund renamed itself Deltic 9000 Locomotives Ltd (DNLL) with a view to operate its locomotives pulling special charter trains and railtours. Royal Scots Grey was sent for a complete overhaul to allow the locomotive to be operated on the mainline, and in November 1996 was returned to service pulling her first railtour. In 1997/98, it was hired to Virgin CrossCountry. DNLL, through the sponsorship of Porterbrook, was able to overhaul Gordon Highlander for service on the mainline between 1998 and 1999. At this time, the locomotive was transferred to the ownership of Porterbrook, returning to DNLL ownership in 2002. In 1998, DNLL also entered into a ten-year agreement with the National Railway Museum to undertake the operation of their Class 55, D9002/55002 (King's Own Yorkshire Light Infantry), on charter trains. However, in June 2004, DNLL went into voluntary liquidation. At that time, both Royal Scots Grey and Gordon Highlander were offered for sale, with both entering private ownership.

== Life after DNLL ==
=== Royal Scots Grey ===
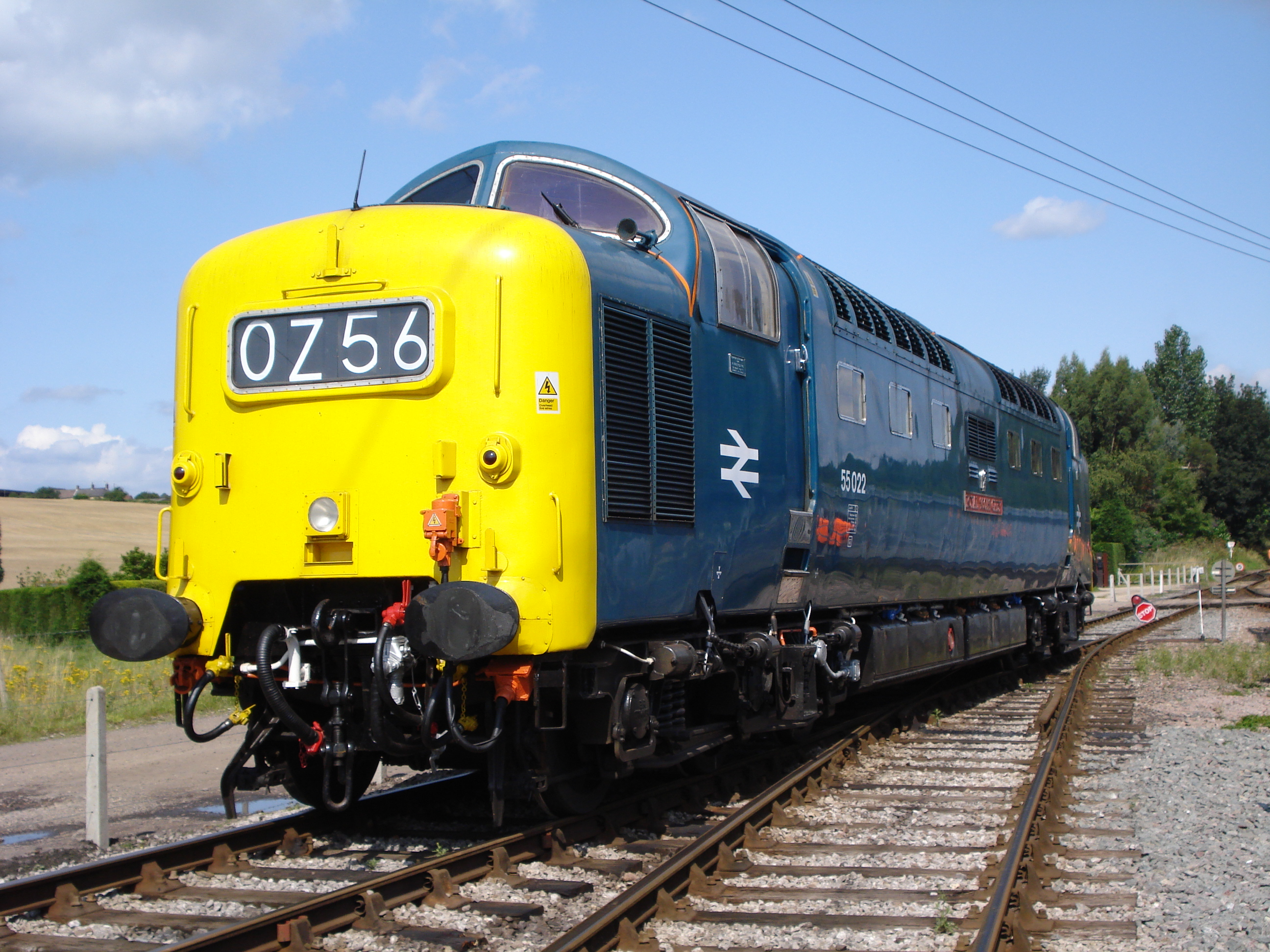
55022 Royal Scots Grey August 2009

In July 2004 Martin Walker purchased 55022 Royal Scots Grey. In December 2004 preparation were made to move 55022 from Hornsey TMD to Barrow Hill Roundhouse where the major work was to be undertaken by the Deltic Preservation Society. The move was done in January 2005 with help from the Class 40 Preservation Society, by providing its Class 40 40145 East Lancashire Railway for rail transportation. In July 2005 the first section of the outer body skin was welded into place. Work was completed in July 2006 and both Napier Deltic engines were started successfully.

The next major leap for Royal Scots Grey was in August 2006 when TPWS and OTMR systems were certified and mainline tests were successfully completed. Royal Scots Grey worked her first passenger train in four years at the Deltic Preservation Society Doncaster tribute weekend at Barrow Hill and also moved to her new East Lancashire Railway home. The loco has consistently worked since 2006 on a variety of passenger and freight duty throughout the country. She worked for 2 years and 8 months in Scotland hauling Electric Multiple Units for maintenance, as well as a stint working the Royal Scotsman luxury train to Mallaig and Kyle of Lochalsh. In December 2017, it was sold to Locomotive Services.

Royal Scots Grey was for a time the only mainline class 55 Deltic out of the remaining 6, being joined in 2012 by D9009 and 55002. However, 55022 has seen the most use, and as of early 2016, the other two have carried out in 5 years a similar amount of work to what 55022 does in a busy month.

=== Gordon Highlander ===
Gordon Highlander entered private ownership and worked at Peak Rail for many years until she was sold to Harry Needle Railroad Company and was later sold to Direct Rail Services. The locomotive was stored at Barrow Hill until purchase by Martin Walker. who also owned of 55022 'Royal Scots Grey'. It worked for a short while on the East Lancashire Railway before her working engine was removed in early 2010 and installed in 55022 for her return to mainline twin engine operations. The other engine was worked on and soon returned to service and the loco continued to operate at the East Lancashire Railway until the loco left and moved to the Great Central Railway at Loughborough for a successful operating season. It is the long-term aim to restore D9016 to twin engine operation, although bodywork and power unit restoration is required. In January 2015 D9016 moved by road to Boden Rail Engineering's facility at Washwood Heath for bodywork repairs to be carried out. In December 2017, it was sold to Locomotive Services.
