= Hull Executive =

Overview
- Service type: Passenger train
- Predecessor: The Hull Pullman
- First service: 8 May 1978
- Last service: 31 March 2015 (as a named service)
- Former operators: East Coast; National Express East Coast; GNER; InterCity; British Rail

Route
- Termini: London King's Cross; Hull
- Service frequency: Daily
- Lines used: East Coast; Selby

Technical
- Rolling stock: InterCity 125
- Operating speed: 125 mph

The Hull Executive was a named English passenger train operated by East Coast and its predecessors. It ran daily in each direction between London King's Cross and Hull via the East Coast and Selby Lines. It was operated by diesel-powered InterCity 125 High Speed Trains.

== History ==
The service was introduced on 8 May 1978 by British Rail, replacing the previous The Hull Pullman. At first the service was operated by Class 55 Deltic locomotives hauling Mark 2 carriages. These were replaced by High Speed Trains in January 1981, by which time the Hull Executive was Hull's only through train to London.

The name was used for a morning service to London returning in the evening. It called at Brough and Selby as well as certain stations on the East Coast Main Line from Doncaster southwards. Prior to 2000, it was routed via Goole instead of Selby.

In September 2000, Hull Trains began operating services on the same route and today operates seven return services.

The name was still being shown in East Coast timetables up until its cessation in March 2015, but was quietly dropped by Virgin Trains East Coast when it took over the InterCity East Coast franchise in April 2015. The service now runs without a name and is operated by London North Eastern Railway.
