= Meld (horse) =

British-bred Thoroughbred racehorse

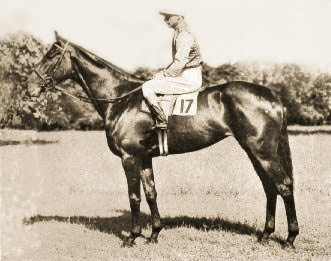
- Sire: Alycidon
- Grandsire: Donatello
- Dam: Daily Double
- Damsire: Fair Trial
- Sex: Mare
- Foaled: 1952
- Country: Great Britain
- Colour: Bay
- Breeder: Someries Stud
- Owner: Lady Zia Wernher
- Trainer: Cecil Boyd-Rochfort
- Record: 6: 5-1-0
- Earnings: £43,051

Major wins
- 1000 Guineas (1955); Coronation Stakes (1955); Epsom Oaks (1955); St Leger Stakes (1955)

Honours
- Deltic locomotive 55003 was named Meld
- Last updated on 15 January 2008

Meld (1952–1977) was a British Thoroughbred racehorse. When she completed the English Fillies Triple Crown by defeating Nucleus in the 1955 St Leger, she was only the fourth filly to do so in the 20th century. She was undefeated as a three-year-old (3YO) and was head of the 3YO Handicap.

== Pedigree ==
Meld was well bred, being by the top-class stayer and successful sire, Alycidon, her dam Daily Double who won four races and was the dam of five winners was by Fair Trial. The second dam of Meld was Doubleton by Bahram, making her a half-sister to Precipitation. Meld was line-bred to Blandford in the fourth generation (4x4).

== Racing record ==
Meld dominated her rivals in the 1,000 Guineas and The Oaks, before taking on the colts for the first time that year in St Leger Stakes at Doncaster. She won by just under a length, and then had to survive an objection from Lester Piggott, who had ridden Nucleus. Her win enabled Cecil Boyd-Rochfort to become the first trainer in England to have won more than £1 million for his patrons. Meld's winnings of £43,051 was an all-time record for fillies in England for at least several years after her retirement.

== Stud record ==
Meld produced six winners including:

- Charlottown (seven wins, including Epsom Derby for £116,863, and sire in England and Australia. He carried the colours of Lady Zia Wernher.
- Intaglio, a winner and was the second dam of Easy Regent (Critérium de Saint-Cloud etc.)
- Lysander II, a successful sire in Australia
- Mellay, unraced, leading sire in New Zealand in 1973 and 1977
- Scarletville, winner, sire.

Meld's more modern descendants include Intaglio's great-great-great-grandson Ramonti.

== Honours ==
Following the London & North Eastern Railway tradition of naming locomotives after winning racehorses, British Railways Deltic diesel locomotive no. D9003 (later 55 003) was named after the horse on 7 July 1961, and remained in service until 31 December 1980.

== See also ==
- Triple Crown of Thoroughbred Racing
