= Permissive Working =

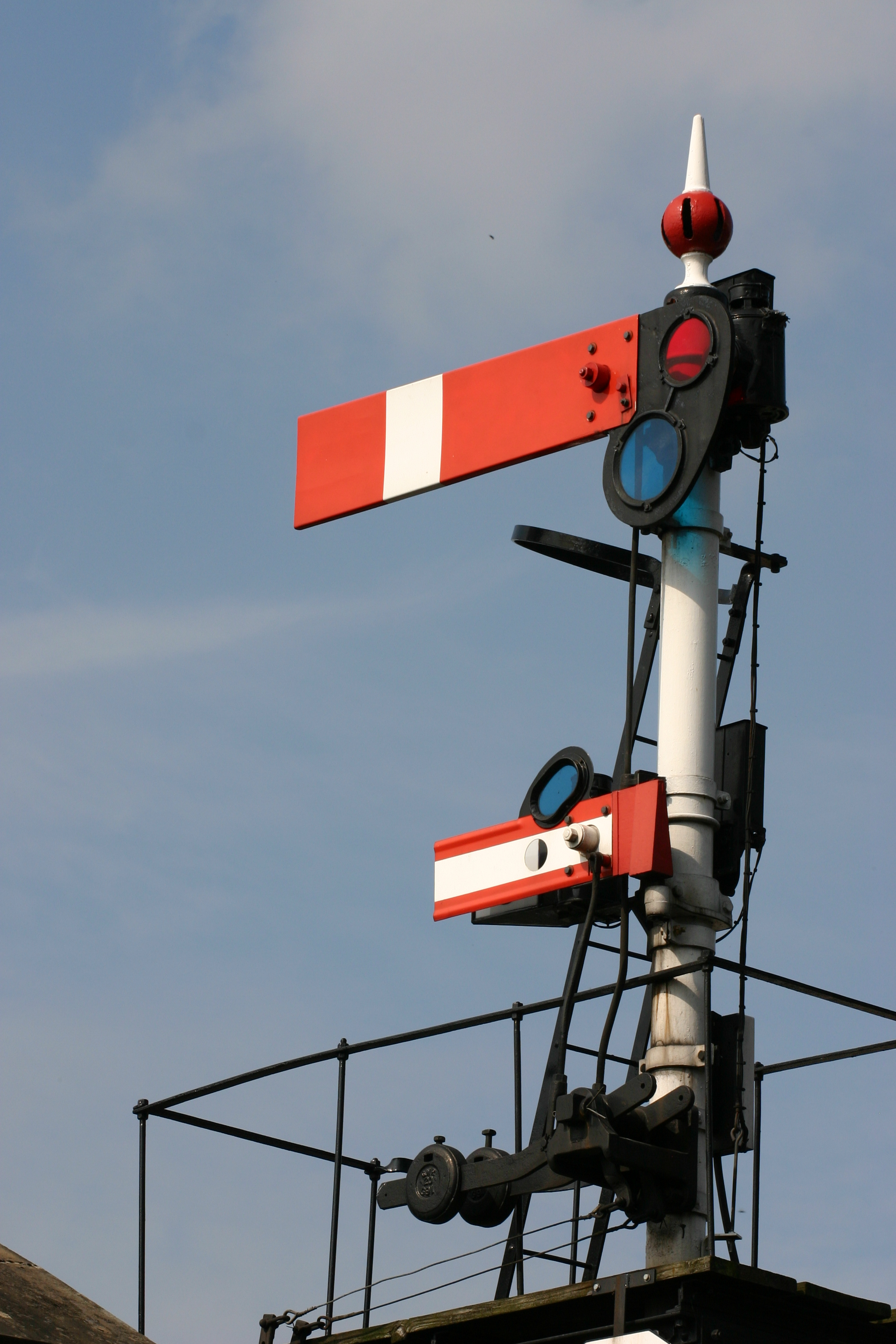
The smaller signal arm is a 'Calling On' signal, which when showing 'Proceed' allows a train to enter a section already occupied by another train

Permissive Working on a railway in the United Kingdom allows more than one train at a time to be on the same line in a block section, a signal section or a dead-end platform line.

== Authorisation ==
The areas where Permissive Working is allowed are given in Table A of the Network Rail Sectional Appendix.

== Exceptions ==
Even where it is not authorised, a shunting movement can be allowed to enter a portion of line that is already occupied providing that it is for the purpose of:

- attaching vehicles
- detaching vehicles
- removing vehicles.

== Driving towards another train ==
When it is permitted to drive a train towards the rear of another train, such as where trains queue to enter or exit a depot, the driver must:

- proceed with caution
- not pass a signal which has been cleared for the train in front until it has been replaced to danger and then cleared for their movement.
