= Brian Webb (railway historian) =

Railway historian

- Born: 1934 or 1935; Carlisle
- Died: 1981 (aged 46)
- Known for: Railway historian

Brian Webb (1935–1981) was a railway historian and author of several books on British railways, published through the 1970s. He specialised in some of the less prominent aspects of the railways, such as industrial railways and diesel locomotives.

For 15 years, until his death, he worked with his partner and copy typist, Sandra J.C. Tassell.

He died suddenly, in 1981, immediately before publication of his book on the Deltic. His last book, on the diesel locomotives of Armstrong Whitworth, was completed in manuscript in 1979, however it was not finally published for another thirty years.

== Publications ==
- Webb, Brian (1973). The British Internal Combustion Locomotive, 1894-1940. David & Charles. ISBN 0-7153-6115-5.
- —— (1976). English Electric Main Line Diesel Locomotives of BR. David & Charles. ISBN 0-7153-7158-4.
- —— (1978). Lord Carlisle's Railways. RCTS. ISBN 0-901115-43-6.
- —— (1978). Sulzer Diesel Locomotives of British Rail. David & Charles. ISBN 0-7153-7514-8.
- Webb, Brian; Duncan, John (1979). AC Electric Locomotives of British Rail. David & Charles. ISBN 978-0-7153-7663-8. OCLC 6916046.
- —— (1982). Deltic Locomotives of British Rail. David & Charles. ISBN 0-7153-8110-5.
- —— (February 1984). "The fantastic Fell". Rail Enthusiast. EMAP National Publications. pp. 23–25. ISSN 0262-561X. OCLC 49957965.
- —— (2010). Armstrong Whitworth: A Pioneer of World Diesel Traction. Lightmoor Publishing. ISBN 978-1-899889-45-7.
