= Haymarket Depot =

Railway depot in Edinburgh, Scotland

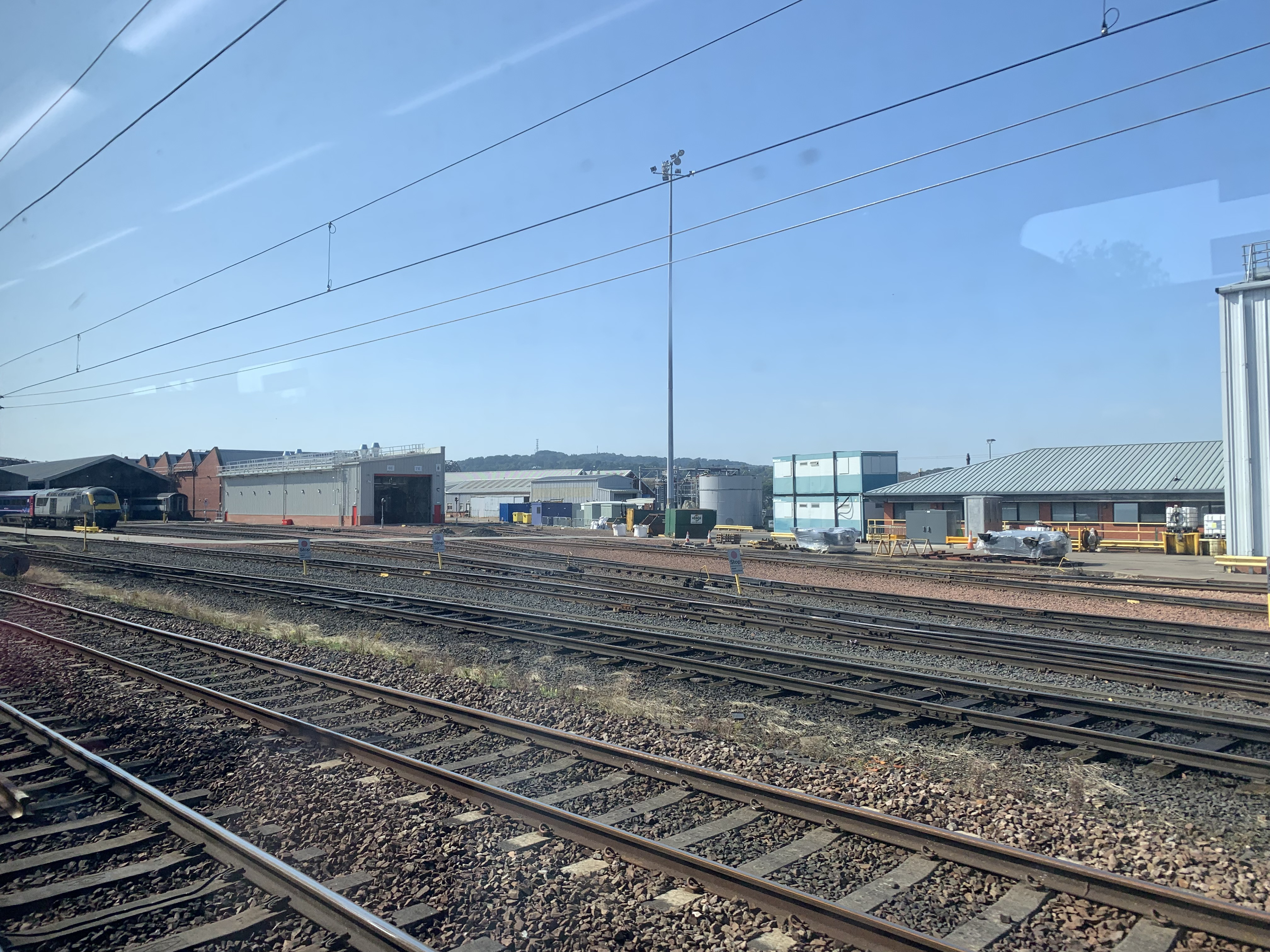
- Haymarket Depot
- Interactive map of Haymarket Depot

Location
- Location: Roseburn, Edinburgh, Scotland
- Coordinates: 55.9421°N 3.2339°W

Characteristics
- Owner: Network Rail
- Operator: ScotRail
- Depot code: HA (1973-present)
- Type: DMU

History
- BR region: Scottish Region
- Former depot code: 64B (1948-1973)

Haymarket Depot, also known as Haymarket Motive Power Depot and Haymarket Traction Maintenance Depot (TMD), is a railway traction maintenance depot situated inside Edinburgh, Scotland, next to Haymarket railway station and Murrayfield Stadium. The depot is operated by ScotRail. The depot code is HA.

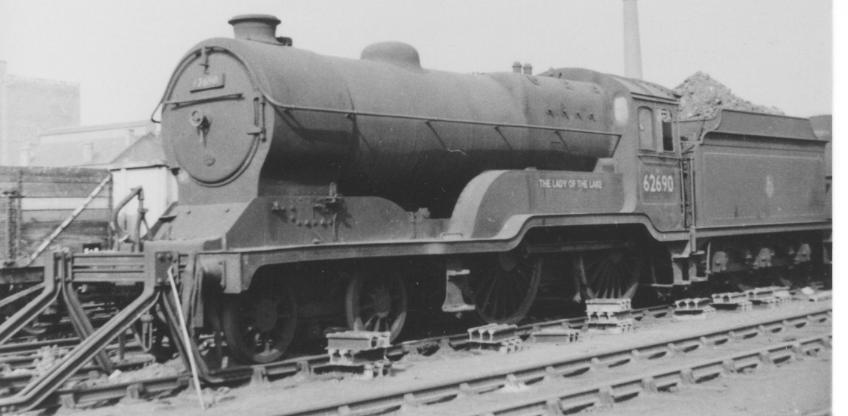
D11/2 Class LNER (ex-GCR Class 11F) 4-4-0 62690 "Lady of the Lake" at Haymarket shed, Edinburgh, on 2 September 1958

== Allocation ==
- Class 170
- Class 43 High Speed Train
- Class 158
