= Britain's Great Little Railways =

Miniature and narrow gauge railways organisation

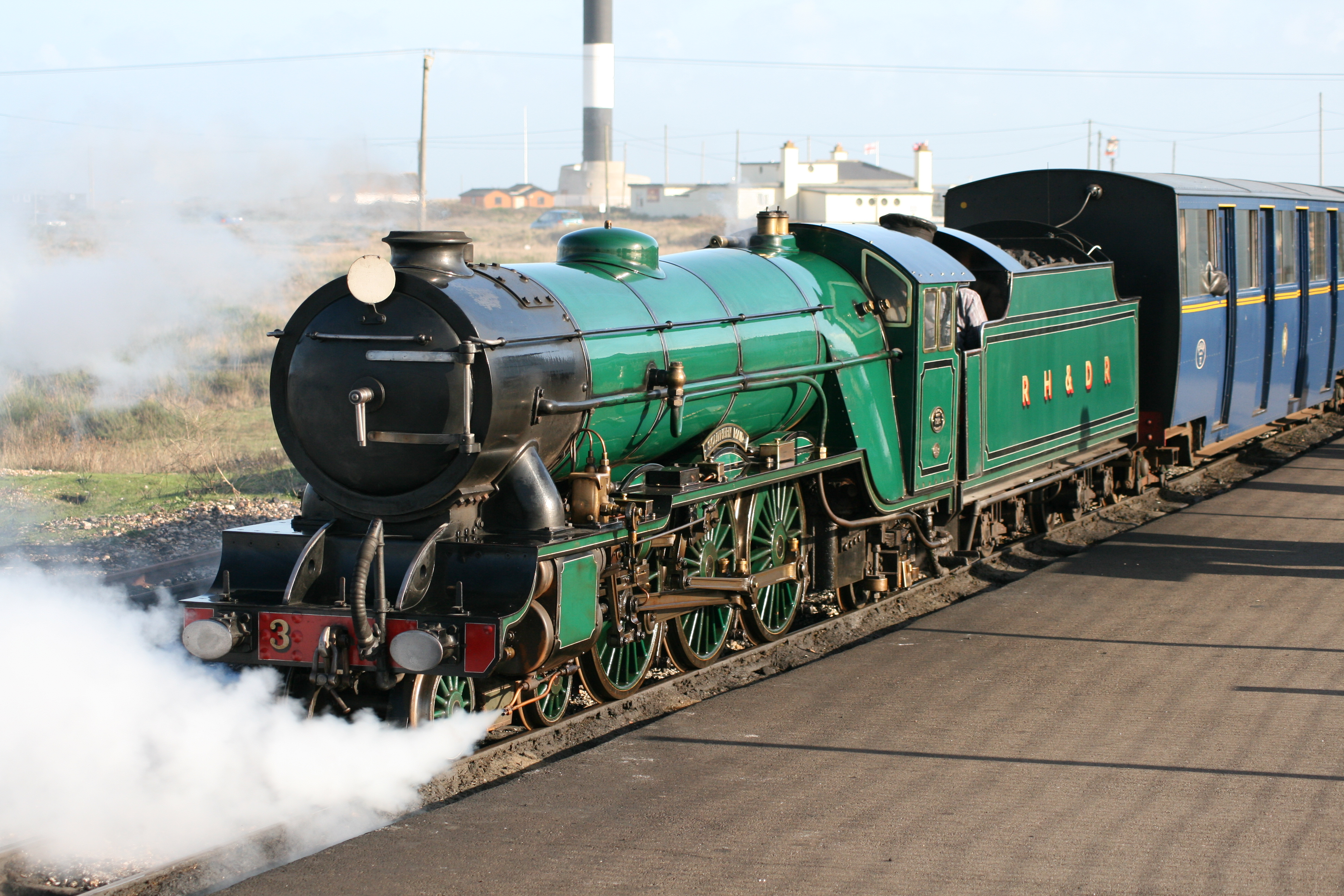
"Southern Maid" at Dungeness, Romney, Hythe and Dymchurch Railway

Britain's Great Little Railways is a company, created in 1994, to provide an umbrella organisation for the owners and operators of the miniature and narrow gauge railways in Great Britain and the Isle of Man. It represents railways with gauges between 5 in (127 mm) and 20 in (508 mm). Its members include purely commercial operators and heritage railways with long histories, such as the Rhyl Miniature Railway which celebrated its centenary in 2011.

== Administration ==
The company is run on a not for profit basis with four directors who are volunteers chosen from and elected by the members. The stated aim of the company is to share knowledge and information and to improve the safety of the members' railways. It is a corporate member of the Heritage Railway Association.

== Meetings ==
Two members' meetings are held each year in March and October at a member railway. The company publishes posters, leaflets, an e-magazine and a website about its member railways. In 2011 there are over 30 member railways spread across the UK.

== Members ==
As of April 2025, the organisation comprises the following railways:

- Alexandra Park Woodland Railway
- Barnards Miniature Railway
- Beer Heights Light Railway
- Bekonscot Railway
- Bentley Miniature Railway
- Brickworks Miniature Railway
- Bridge View Light Railway
- Cleethorpes Coast Light Railway
- Crewe Heritage Centre Miniature Railway
- East Herts Miniature Railway
- Eastleigh Lakeside Steam Railway
- Echills Wood Railway
- Exbury Gardens Steam Railway
- Fairbourne Railway
- Fancott Miniature Railway
- Ferry Meadows Railway
- Great Laxey Mine Railway
- Hastings Miniature Railway
- Ingfield Light Railway
- Lappa Valley Railway
- Leek & Rudyard Railway
- Littlehampton Miniature Railway
- Mizens Miniature Railway
- Moors Valley Railway
- Museum of Power – Langford and Beeleigh MR
- Rhyl Miniature Railway
- Riverside Miniature Railway
- Romney, Hythe & Dymchurch Railway
- Scarborough North Bay Railway
- Shibden Miniature Railway
- South Devon Miniature Railway
- South Downs Light Railway
- Stapleford Miniature Railway
- Summerfields Miniature Railway
- Swanley New Barn Railway
- Thompson Park Railway
- Watford Miniature Railway
- Whitfield Light Railway

== See also ==
- Great Little Trains of Wales
- Heritage Railway Association
