= Tulyar (disambiguation) =

Tulyar was a racehorse, winner of the 1952 Epsom Derby.

Tulyar can also refer to:

- An English Electric 'Deltic' diesel locomotive, no. 55015
- A diesel locomotive on the Swanley New Barn Railway
