= Roy Francis (Royal Navy officer) =

Royal Navy officer (1922–2015)

- Born: Roy Wallace Francis; 2 July 1922; Chingford, Essex, England
- Died: 27 January 2015 (aged 92); Norfolk and Norwich University Hospital, Norwich, Norfolk
- Burial place: St. Peter's Church, Forncett St Peter, Norfolk
- Spouse: Marie (nee Bartlett)
- Relatives: Two children
- Military career
- Allegiance: United Kingdom
- Branch: Royal Navy
- Service years: 1939–1956
- Rank: Lieutenant-Commander
- Units: HMS Conway; HMS Manchester; HMS Duke of York; HMS Edinburgh; HMS Waveney; HMS Papua
- Commands: HMS Barndale; HMS Uplifter
- Awards: Arctic Star, Ushakov Medal
- Other work: Wells Harbour Railway, Wells & Walsingham Light Railway

Lieutenant-Commander Roy Wallace Francis (2 July 1922 – 27 January 2015) was a British naval officer who served on HMS Edinburgh and HMS Manchester during World War II. He was later the founder of the 10 1/4 in (260 mm) gauge Wells Harbour Railway and Wells & Walsingham Light Railway, both located in Wells-next-the-Sea, Norfolk, United Kingdom. Francis died aged 92.

== Early life ==
Francis was born in Chingford, Essex on 2 July 1922 the son of Colonel Aubrey Francis. Francis developed an interest in railways at an early age. He had an ambition to work on the railway, but his father signed him up for a naval school at the age of fourteen.

== Military service ==
Francis joined the training ship HMS Conway in 1936 and joined the Royal Navy as a midshipman in 1939. During World War II, Francis served in the Royal Navy on HMS Manchester, which was in the Mediterranean in July 1941 when she was hit by the first aerial torpedo used in combat by the Germans. He then served on HMS Duke of York. Following promotion to sub-lieutenant, he served on HMS Edinburgh, which was involved in the escorting of convoys to the Soviet Union. After that ship was sunk in 1942, he served on K248 - River-class Frigate HMS Waveney. For his service on the Arctic convoys, he was awarded the Arctic Star and Ushakov Medal. In 1943, he was transferred to K588 HMS Papua. The Colony Class frigate was launched on 10 October 1943, sponsored by Mrs. William Eastham. The ship transferred to the United Kingdom under Lend-Lease on 25 July 1944 and was one of four that sank U-1014 off Malin Head, County Donegal, Ireland. In November 1945, Francis was given command of the Bar class Boom Defence Vessel Z92 HMS Barndale. In 1949, HMS Barndale was involved in trials assessing the effect of nuclear blasts on ships. HMS Arethusa was the subject of these experiments. He was then engaged in mine clearance operations off Sierra Leone until 1951. He was also involved in the search for a missing American nuclear trigger off Orford Ness, Suffolk in 1955. The trigger was recovered.

== Civilian life ==
Francis married Marie Bartlett in 1942. They had a son and a daughter. He left the Royal Navy in 1956, and set up a boat building company in the Norfolk Broads, Rowancraft Ltd. He maintained his interest in railways, taking miniature steam trains to fairs during the 1960s and 1970s. In 1972, he had an 0-4-2ST steam locomotive built by David King. Named Edmund Hannay, it was used on the Wells Harbour Railway (WHR), which Francis built in 1976 at Wells-next-the-Sea, Norfolk at the request of Norfolk County Council in a bid to alleviate traffic congestion in the town. He later sold the WHR to finance the construction of the Wells and Walsingham Light Railway, which runs between Wells-next-the-Sea and Walsingham, Norfolk and opened in 1982.

== Death ==
Francis died in the Norfolk and Norwich University Hospital on 27 January 2015 at the age of 92. He left a wife, Marie, two children, three grandchildren and two great-grandchildren. His funeral was held on 13 February at St. Peter's Church, Forncett St Peter, Norfolk, attended by about 200 people. Francis lived in nearby Forncett St Mary.
