= Sheringham Shoal Offshore Wind Farm =

Offshore wind farm in the North Sea

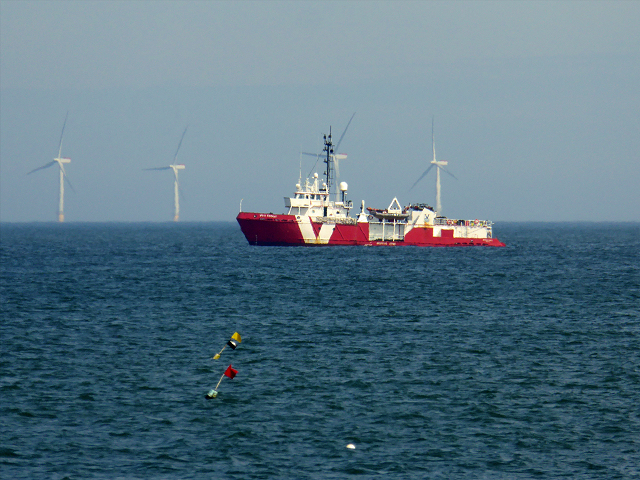
- Country: United Kingdom
- Coordinates: 53°07′00″N 1°08′00″E
- Status: Operational
- Commission date: September 2012
- Owners: Equitix; Equinor; Green Investment Group
- Operator: Equinor

Wind farm
- Type: Offshore
- Max. water depth: 15–22 m (49–72 ft)
- Distance from shore: 17 km (11 mi)
- Rotor diameter: 107 m (351 ft)
- Site area: 35 km^{2} (14 sq mi)

Power generation
- Units operational: 88 × 3.6 MW
- Make and model: Siemens Gamesa SWT-3.6-107 (88)
- Nameplate capacity: 317 MW
- Annual net output: 1,200 GWh (2013)

External links
- Website: sheringhamshoal.co.uk
- Commons: Related media on Commons

Wind farm layout

Sheringham Shoal Offshore Wind Farm is a Round 2 wind farm in North Sea off the coast of Norfolk. A lease for use of the sea bed was obtained in 2004 by Scira Offshore Energy (later acquired by Statoil (now Equinor) and Statkraft), the development gained offshore planning consent in 2008, and was constructed 2009–2011, being officially opened in 2012.

The wind farm has 88 Siemens Wind Power 3.6MW turbines (total power 316.8 MW) spread over a 35 km^{2} (14 sq mi) area over 17 km (11 mi) from shore.

== History ==
In 2004 the Crown Estate awarded Econventures (Utrecht, NL) the lease of the Round 2 wind farm site at Sheringham shoal. Econventures together with SLP Energy (Lowestoft, UK) formed a joint venture Scira Offshore Energy to develop a c. 315MW wind farm. Development work for Econventures was to be carried out by Evelop BV, both subsidiaries of Econcern BV. In 2005 Hydro took a 50% stake in Scira, acquiring 25% shareholdings from both SLP Energy and Ecocentures.

In 2006 Scira submitted a planning application to the Department of Trade and Industry for a 108 turbine, 315 MW wind farm.

The planned wind farm was approximately 18 kilometres (11 mi) off the coast of Norfolk at Sheringham, just within the 12 nm UK territorial water boundary, and 5 kilometres (3.1 mi) north of the sand bank known as Sheringham shoal. The wind farm would be located at water depths of 16 to 22 metres (52 to 72 ft) and consist of somewhere between 45 and 108 turbines. Benefits of the site included low shipping and trawling intensities; lack of any dredging, dumping, oil/gas, or MoD practice areas, and of cables or pipelines; as well as low visual impact from the coast, and outside any nature conservation areas. The seabed at the wind farm and offshore cable route consisted of mainly gravely sand, overlying chalk. The electrical power export cable was to be connected to a switching station near Muckleburgh Collection, via landfall near Weybourne Hope. Two routes were considered for the export cable, one avoiding the sandbank at Sheringham shoal. The connection to the National Grid was planned to be made at an electrical substation near Salle, Norfolk via a 132kV 21.3 kilometres (13.2 mi) underground cable.

Planning consent for the wind farm was given on 8 August 2008.

In 2009 Statkraft acquired 50% of the shareholding in Scira becoming joint (50:50) owners of the development. In 2014 the Green Investment Bank took a £240 million 20% stake in the wind farm.

The lease on the sea bed given by the Crown Estate has a duration of 50 years, and the (initial) wind farm has an estimated lifespan of 20 years. The 2004 Energy Act requires the developer to decommission the wind farm once out of use - the decommissioning plan submitted by the developer included: removal of wind turbines, cutting of foundations at seabed level or lower, whilst interarray cables would be left on the sea bed.

=== Construction ===
In April 2008 Nexans was awarded a €24m contract for the supply and construction of the 145kV export cables, and was awarded a €12m ($15.8m) contract in April 2009 to supply 81 km of 36kV inter-array cables. Areva obtained a €50 million contract to supply offshore and onshore substations in late 2008, design and project management of the offshore substations was sub-contracted to Wood Group.

Design work on the turbine and substation foundations was contracted to Ramboll. The two foundations for the substations and foundations for 88 turbines were supplied by MT Højgaard. Manufacture of the turbine monopiles and transition pieces was subcontracted to Sif Group and Smulders. The substation superstructure and foundations were subcontracted to Heerema (topside), Bladt Industries (transition pieces) and Sif Group and Smulders (piles). In 2009 Siemens obtained a €450 million contract to supply 88 wind turbines to the wind farm.

Onshore work began in 2009, and construction of the offshore part began March 2010. Turbine foundations installation began in June 2010; MT Højgaard installed the substation piles and 17 of the turbine foundations, using the vessel Svanen, halting installation due to a previously scheduled contract for the installation vessel. The foundations installed by MT Højgaard used a special method: the support of the foundation on the delivery barge had its motion steadied by a 135t sliding support with hydraulic motors compensating for wave oscillations. Delays of several months of the arrival of foundation transport vessels, coupled with wave conditions limiting the operational window of use of the transport vessels, meant that the vessel Svanen was not able to install all the foundations. The delay had an estimated additional cost of 600 million NOK.

Export cable installation began late 2010, under contract to Visser & Smith Marine Contracting. Work was carried out by the ships Atlantic Guardian (route clearance), Team Oman (laying), and VOS Sympathy (trenching).

The offshore substations were installed in May 2011 by Heerema. The remaining pile foundations, and the transition pieces and offshore substation topsides where installed by Seaway Heavy Lifting between May and August 2011 using the newly built Oleg Strashnov. A previous contract with Master Marine for the substation installation was cancelled and transferred to Seaway due to the delays. Foundation and transition piece installation was complete by August 2011.

Inter-array cables were laid by Team Oman, and installed under the sea bed by water jetting by Toisa Warrior. Installation was complete by March 2012.

The turbine installation was contracted to Gulf Marine Services in December 2010, the initial contract with Master Marine was terminated by mutual agreement after the foundation installation delays. Turbine installation was carried out by the jackup vessels Sea Jackand GMS Endeavour, with SEA JACK replaced by Sea Jack Leviathan in late 2011. The first turbine was installed on 3 July 2011, and began generating in August 2011; installation was complete by July 2012.

==== Operations bases ====
As part of the development, the harbour and channel at Wells Harbour was dredged to allow wind-farm maintenance vessels to be based there. A 150 metres (490 ft) pontoon jetty was also built; the work was completed early 2010. An onshore operations base was constructed at Egmere, 3 miles south of Wells-next-the-Sea, with building work taking place in 2012.

=== Operation ===
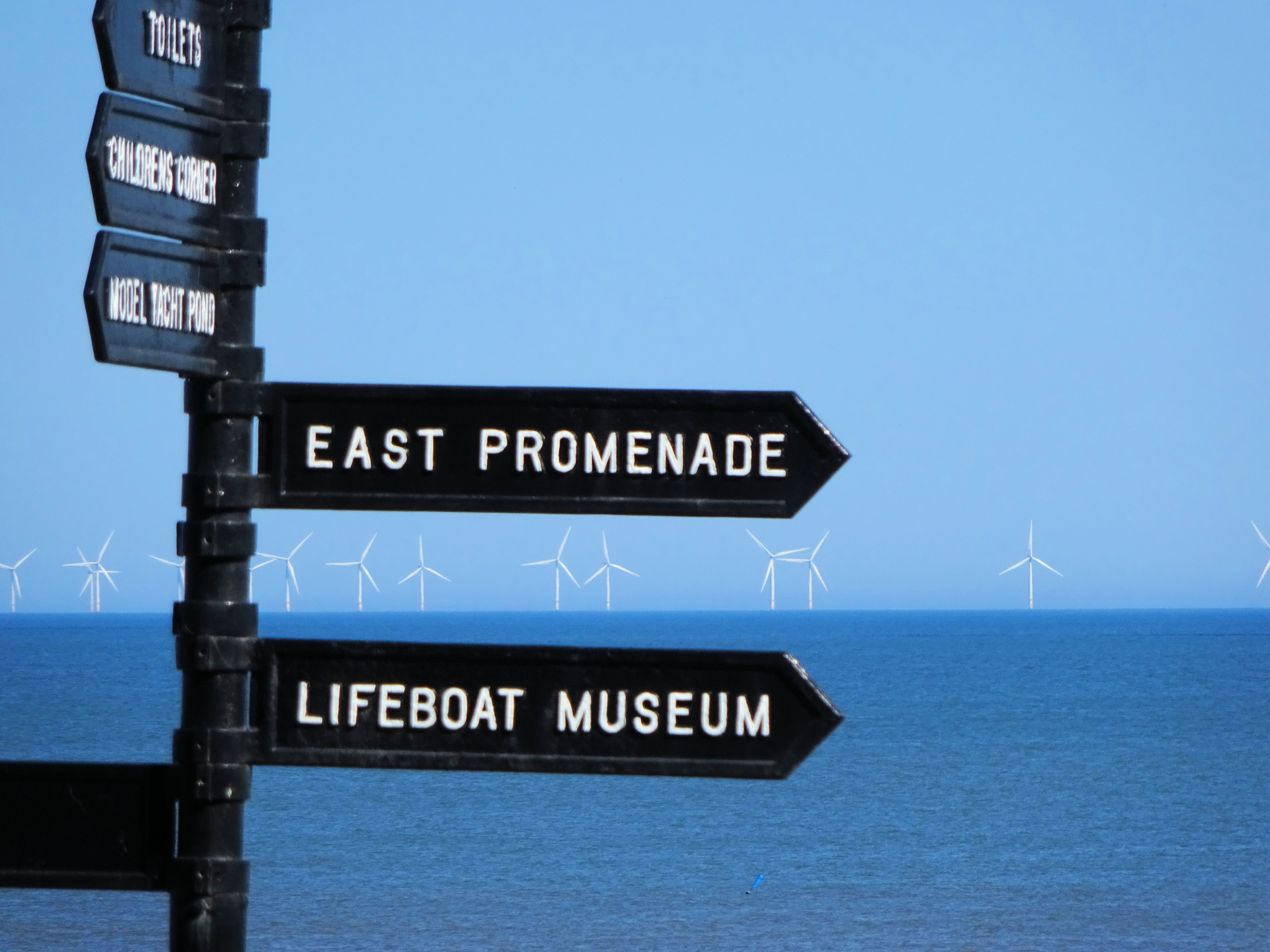
Sheringham Shoal Offshore Wind Farm from Sheringham west cliff

The wind farm was operational by late 2011. An official opening took place on September 27, 2012, attended by Norway's Crown Prince Haakon and UK Secretary of State Ed Davey. The cost of development has been estimated at 10billion Norwegian krona ($1.8 billion). Wells Harbour is used as the operational base for the wind farm.

In June 2013 a consortium, "Blue Transmission" (Macquarie Capital Group, Barclays Infrastructure Funds) acquired the electrical transmission assets of the wind farm for £193 million. In August 2013 Statkraft took over operations and maintenance of the wind farm from Scira. Statoil took over operation from Statkraft, beginning in 2017, while also increasing its share in the proposed Dogger Bank Wind Farm.

By September 2013 the wind farm had generated 1.2TWh in its first year of operation. Its levelised cost has been estimated at £150/MWh.

In April 2025,

== Community Fund ==
The Sheringham Shoal windfarm operates a community benefit fund supporting local charities and community projects. Since its establishment in 2010, the Fund has made grant awards totalling £881,642. The Fund is operated by Norfolk Community Foundation.

== See also ==
- Wind power in the United Kingdom
- List of offshore wind farms
- List of offshore wind farms in the United Kingdom
- List of offshore wind farms in the North Sea

== References and notes ==
=== Sources ===
- Sheringham Shoal Offshore Wind Farm, LORC
- "Sheringham Shoal", www.scira.co.uk
  - Environmental Statement (PDF), Scira, 2006
  - Royal Haskoning (August 2007), Sheringham Shoal Offshore Wind Farm Onshore Grid Connection -Environmental Statement (PDF), Scira
- "Sheringham Shoal Offshore Wind Farm", www.4coffshore.com
- "Sheringham Shoal Offshore Wind Farm, Greater Wash, United Kingdom", www.power-technology.com
