= Kingsbury Water Park =

Country park in North Warwickshire

Coordinates: 52°33′42″N 1°42′4″W

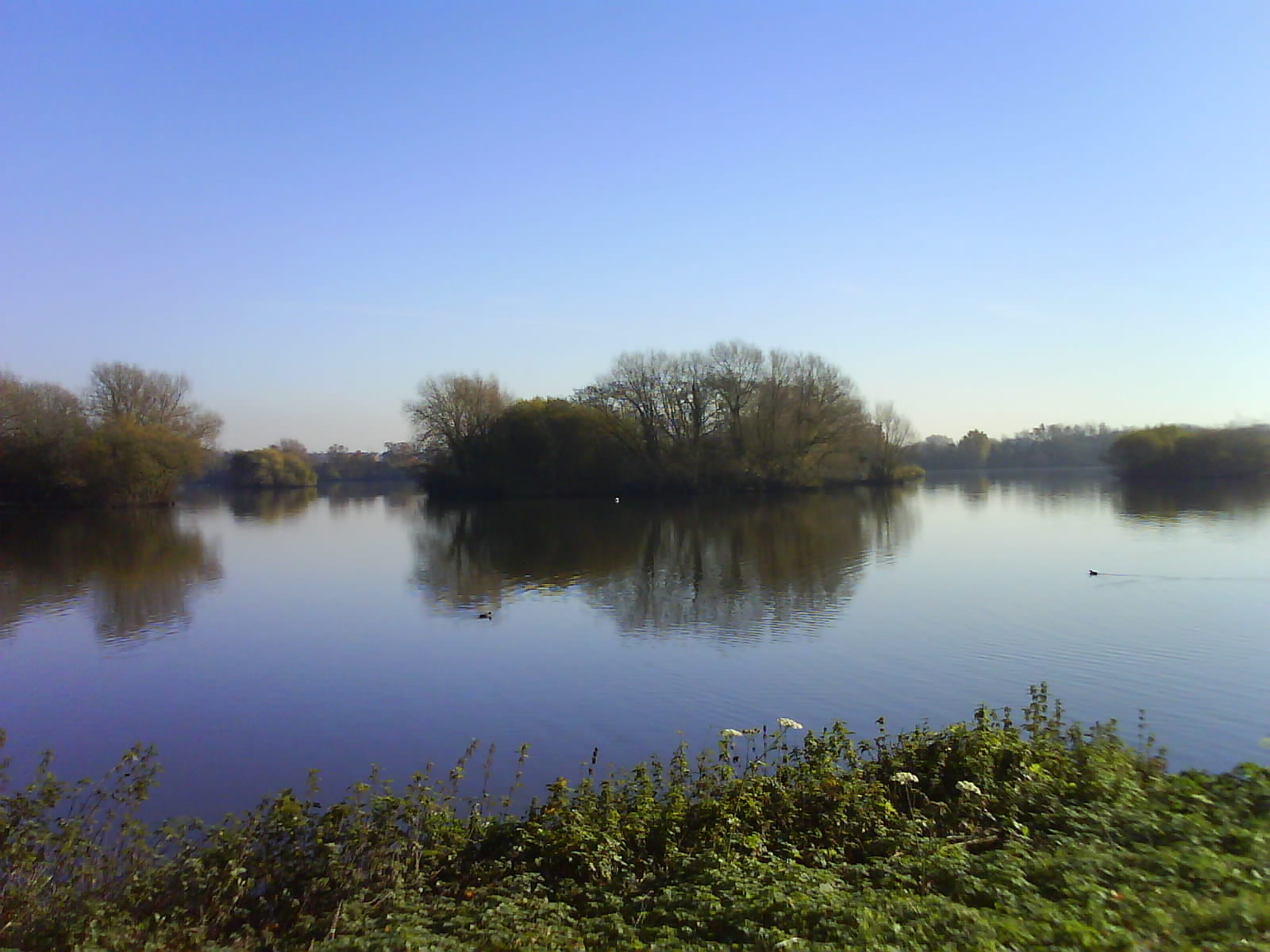
- Kingsbury Water Park
- Interactive map of Kingsbury Water Park
- Type: Country park
- Location: Kingsbury; Warwickshire
- Area: 600 acres (2.4 km^{2})
- Created: 24 May 1975
- Operator: Warwickshire County Council
- Open: All year

Kingsbury Water Park is a country park in north Warwickshire, England, not far from Birmingham and lying on the River Tame. It is owned and managed by Warwickshire County Council. It has fifteen lakes situated in over 600 acres (2.4 km^{2}) of country park. It is renowned for its birdlife, and is popular with birdwatchers. It is bordered on the western edge by the Birmingham and Fazeley Canal.

== History ==
The area which is now Kingsbury Water Park was previously the site of gravel extraction pits that were operated by the Midland Gravel Company. The lakes were created from the craters left behind after the gravel had been taken out. The Water Park was opened on 24 May 1975 with two lakes and 123 acres. It has been expanded over the years and as of 2011 has fifteen lakes in an area covering over 600 acres. The Park welcomed 50,000 visitors in its first year, a number which had expanded to 350,000 in 2007. The Water Park was briefly closed to the public in June 2007 after the area was hit by the worst flooding since the 1930s. At the time it was estimated the floods had caused tens of thousands of pounds' worth of damage. The Park was opened again once the flooding had subsided.

== Features ==
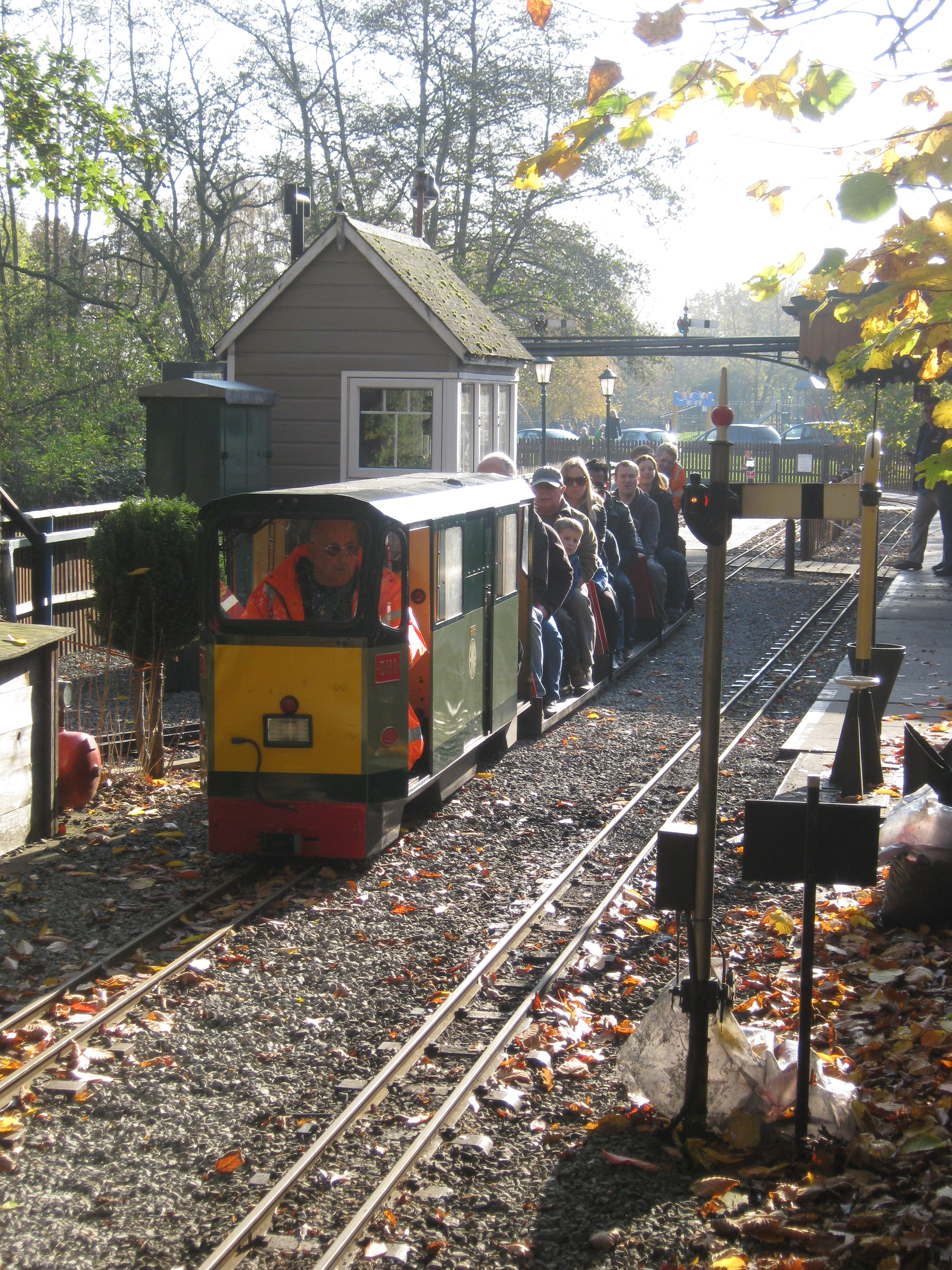
7¼" gauge ridable miniature railway

Throughout the park are a number of bridleways, marked cycle routes and footpaths. There is a cycle hire centre and a variety of opportunities available for water sports, including water skiing, jetskis, power boats, sailing and model boat racing.

There is also a 7¼" gauge ridable miniature railway known as Echills Wood Railway. It is run by enthusiasts, who eventually hope to provide a 2 km loop, running a selection of steam, diesel and electric trains.

In November 2011 a new bird hide was erected by Warwickshire County Council allowing birdwatchers to observe birds in their natural habitat. A previous bird hide had been burnt down in December 2010.

Twelve of the lakes provide the opportunity for angling, offering a variety of coarse angling.

== Events ==
Every Saturday at 9am, the park hosts a free 5-kilometre run, organised by Parkrun. The first Kingsbury Water Parkrun was held on 20 July 2013, with 143 runners. The biggest attendance was 824 runners on 1 January 2020 for the New Year's Day Parkrun.

== Children's facilities ==
Broomey Croft Children's Farm is home to many animals and a play park and is suitable for children of all ages. Situated around the park are a number of play areas, picnic areas and cafés. The park is also home to a bicycle hire centre and has a well established visitor centre and shop.
