= Wells Harbour Railway =

Defunct railway in Norfolk, England

Coordinates: 52°58′5″N 0°50′54″E

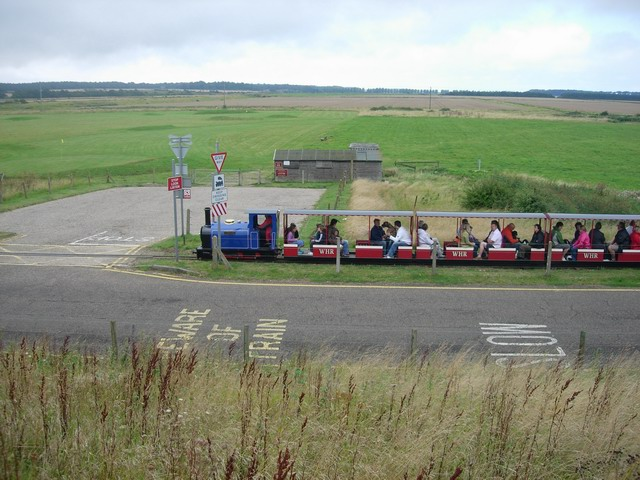
- Howard hauling a southbound train on the Wells Harbour Railway.
- Fleet: 4
- Stations called at: 2
- Stations operated: 2

Technical
- Track gauge: 10 1/4 in (260 mm)
- Length: 1.1 km (0.68 mi)

The Wells Harbour Railway was a 10 1/4 in (260 mm) gauge railway that ran at Wells-next-the-Sea, Norfolk, England. It was 1,200 yards (1,100 m) long, running between Wells Harbour and Pinewoods. The line operated for 45 years, from 1976 to 2021, when it was closed and replaced with a bus service.

== History ==
The Wells Harbour Railway was established in 1976 by Roy Francis. It opened in July of that year. There were two stations, Harbour and Pinewood, located at the town and seaward ends of the line respectively. At the latter there is a caravan park and beach. The railway provided an alternative to the long walk between Wells next the Sea and the beach at Wells Harbour. A bus route once served Pinewoods, but this was withdrawn. The engine shed was located at Pinewoods.

Over 80,000 passengers were carried in the first two years of operation. In January 1978, a storm washed away over 1/2 mile (800 m) of track. The railway was rebuilt and reopened in July that year. In 1980, Francis sold the Wells Harbour Railway and established the Wells and Walsingham Light Railway on part of the trackbed of the dismantled Wymondham to Wells line.

The railway was sold again in 1988, the new owners finding that it was in poor condition. In 1998, new carriages were supplied by Alan Keef of Ross on Wye. A new steam-outline diesel locomotive was supplied by Keef as the new carriages were too heavy for Weasel to pull. The railway was sold after the 2000 season, with the new owners improving the track and Pinewoods station. Another new locomotive was supplied in 2005.

=== Closure ===
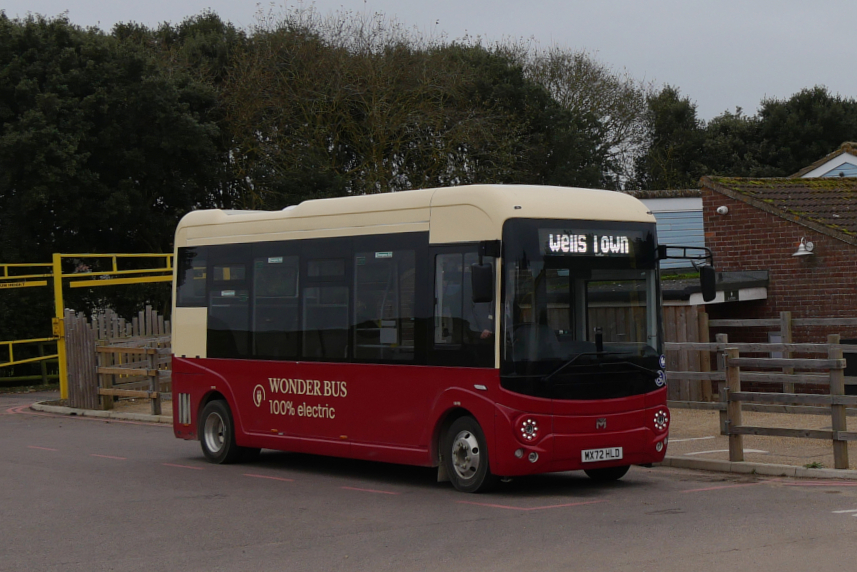
Wonder Bus Mellor Sigma battery electric midibus running the replacement bus service in November 2024

In April 2021 it was announced that the future of the railway was in doubt due to the retirement of the operators and landowner, the Holkham Estate, stating that it was reviewing whether to renew the lease given to the WHR's operators, which was to expire in 2022.

In September 2021 the railway closed, without fanfare, despite protest, with Holkham Estate issuing a briefing repeating closure, saying that all the railway equipment had been sold on to a different location in the UK and that there will be a "replacement service" for transport between the town and the harbour by 2022 season.

The track and rolling stock were removed over a 6–day period in early November 2021 with the support of staff from the purchasers, Lappa Valley Steam Railway, where the rail will be reused to renew the life expired aluminium rail presently installed on the 10.25" railway and the locomotives and carriages supporting the existing fleet.

In December 2021, one of the former locomotives Densil was purchased by the Watford Miniature Railway despite it leaving on the same lorry bound for Cornwall with the track and other rolling stock.

In February 2022, it was announced that an electric bus would replace the railway, with services augmented by a vintage open top bus during busy times.

== Operation ==
The Wells Harbour Railway operated at weekends from Easter to the May Day bank holiday, then daily until the end of September, using a published timetable. It then operated at weekends until the end of October. The railway claims to hold the record of being the first railway of its gauge (or any smaller gauge) to operate a scheduled timetable passenger service.

== Rolling stock ==
=== Locomotives ===
Name	Wheel arrangement	Year built & builder	Notes	Photograph
Densil	0-6-0DH	1998; Alan Keef	Steam outline diesel locomotive. Powered by a one-litre 3-cylinder Perkins engine. Now at the Watford Miniature Railway.	
Howard	0-6-0DH	2005; Alan Keef	Steam outline diesel locomotive. Powered by a one-litre 3-cylinder Perkins engine. Now at the Poole Park Railway.	
The Duke	0-6-0DH	2014; Alan Keef	Diesel locomotive. Powered by a one-litre 3-cylinder Perkins engine. Now at the Lappa Valley Railway.	

=== Former locomotives ===
Name	Wheel arrangement	Year built & builder	Notes	Photograph
Edmund Hannay	0-4-2ST	1972; David King	Steam locomotive. Sold in 2011, and located at Knebworth House, and then the Vanstone Woodland Railway, it is now at Hastings Miniature Railway.	
Weasel	4wPM	1980; David King	Petrol mechanical locomotive. Powered by an Alfa Romeo petrol engine, driving all four wheels. Weasel has now been sold, and its present location is North Cornwall Miniature Railway.	

=== Carriages ===
The original carriages used on the line were made by David King, who was the engineer who built Edmund Hannay. They were two open carriages and two covered carriages with wooden bodies on steel underframes. In 1998, four new covered carriages were made by Alan Keef. These have steel bodies on steel underframes.
