= Great Little Trains of Wales =

List of small heritage railways in Wales

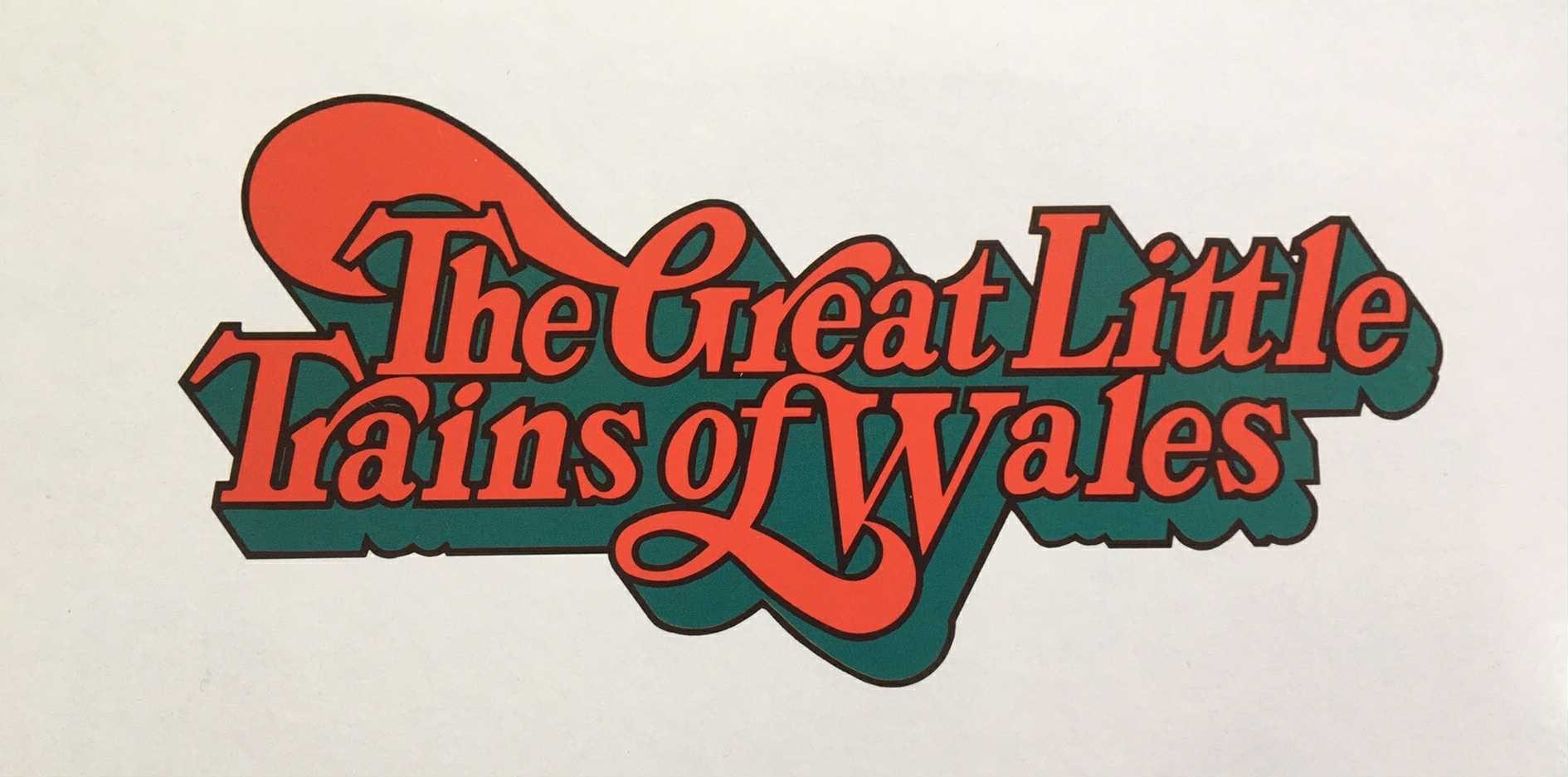
Old logo for the Great Little Trains of Wales

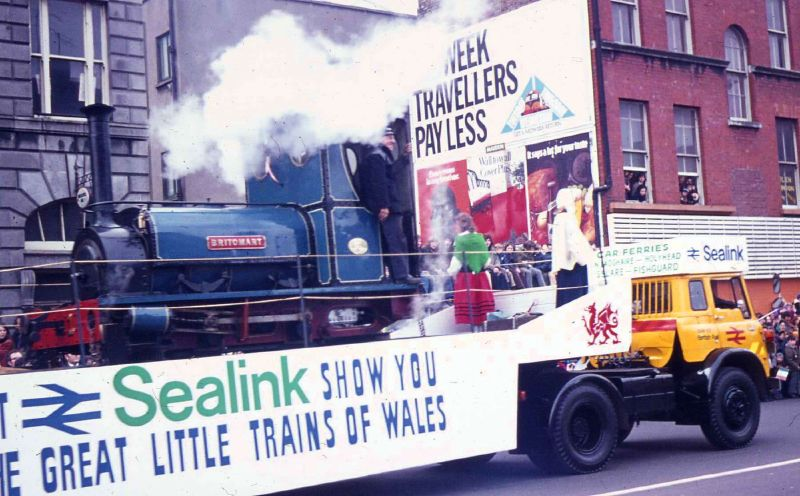
Ffestiniog Railway locomotive Britomart being hauled by a British Rail lorry promotion by Sealink of the Great Little Trains of Wales during the St Patrick's Day Parade in 1974 in Dublin.

The Great Little Trains of Wales (Welsh: Trenau Bach Arbennig Cymru) is a joint marketing scheme formed in 1970 to promote some of the narrow gauge railways of Wales and encourage visitors to Wales. As well as marketing the railways, the scheme allows visitors to purchase a discount card, allowing reduced rates on all the lines.

As of 2021, there are twelve railways in the scheme.

Railway	Image	Gauge	Location
Bala Lake Railway		1 ft 11 5/8 in (600 mm)	Llanuwchllyn
Brecon Mountain Railway		1 ft 11 3/4 in (603 mm)	Merthyr Tydfil
Corris Railway		2 ft 3 in (686 mm)	Corris
Fairbourne Railway		12 1/4 in (311 mm) (Formerly 15 in (381 mm) until 1986)	Fairbourne
Ffestiniog Railway		1 ft 11 1/2 in (597 mm)	Porthmadog
Llanberis Lake Railway		1 ft 11 3/4 in (603 mm)	Llanberis
Snowdon Mountain Railway		2 ft 7 1/2 in (800 mm)	Llanberis
Talyllyn Railway		2 ft 3 in (686 mm)	Tywyn
Vale of Rheidol Railway		1 ft 11 3/4 in (603 mm) (Formerly 1 ft 11 1/2 in (597 mm))	Aberystwyth
Welsh Highland Railway		1 ft 11 1/2 in (597 mm)	Caernarfon
Welsh Highland Heritage Railway		1 ft 11 1/2 in (597 mm)	Porthmadog
Welshpool and Llanfair Light Railway		2 ft 6 in (762 mm)	Welshpool

In 2024, The Merioneth & Llantisilly Rail Traction Company Limited, and Ivor the Engine, were inducted as the 13th (and only fictional) member of Great Little Trains of Wales.

== See also ==
- Britain's Great Little Railways
- Heritage Railway Association
- British narrow gauge railways
