= Wells Harbour =

Harbour in Wells next the Sea, Norfolk, England

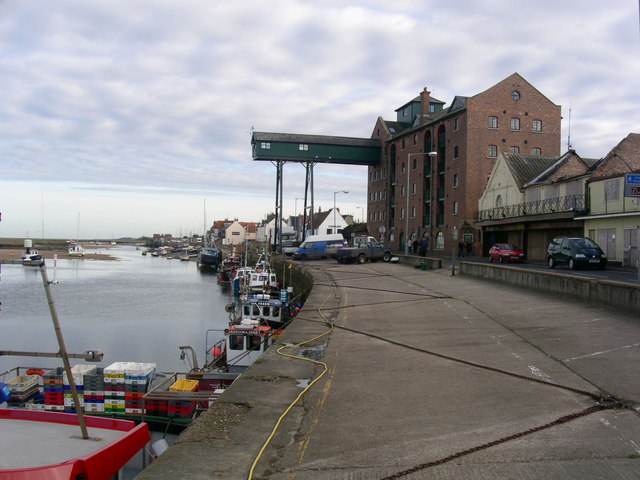
- The Harbour, Wells next the Sea
- Interactive map of Wells Harbour
- Location within Norfolk

Location
- Country: England
- Location: Wells-next-the-sea, North Norfolk, Norfolk
- Coordinates: 52.95355°N 00.85307°E

Details
- Opened: 1400s
- Owned by: Port of Wells

Statistics
- Website www.wellsharbour.co.uk

Wells Harbour is located in the town of Wells-next-the-Sea in the county of Norfolk, England. The harbour is 21 miles west of Cromer, 34.8 miles north of Norwich and 123 miles north of London. The harbour lies north of the A149 between King's Lynn and Great Yarmouth. The nearest railway station is now at Sheringham for the Bittern Line which runs between Sheringham, Cromer and Norwich. The nearest airport is Norwich International Airport.

== Description ==
The harbour is on the North Norfolk Coast. It is used by a small fishing fleet and by visiting commercial and fishing vessels, including vessels engaged in surveys, crew transfer or safety boat operations. The harbour also caters for a growing number of leisure craft which are both local boats and an increasing amount of visiting craft. Coastal trips to see the seals at Blakeney Point and chartered fishing and diving trips are also available in the high season. Berthed at the quay is the historic vessel Albatros. The vessel is used for a variety of functions including charters, cruises and sometime just as a venue for entertaining.

== History ==
There has been a port at Wells for over 600 years. The harbour is protected by salt marshes behind a sand bar. Because it is a natural safe haven from the unpredictable North Sea weather the Port of Wells was one of England's major harbours in Tudor times and a thriving, centre for shipping and maritime industry in the 18th and 19th centuries. Its greatest period of prosperity was probably from 1830 to 1860. The stone quay side was constructed in 1845 following an Act of Parliament the previous year. The coming of the railway in 1857 marked the beginning of decline though there was a resurgence from 1960 to 1989 when coasters bringing fertilizer and animal feed came in some numbers. The Granary with its distinctive gantry was built around 1904; it has now been turned into apartments. The gantry allowed grain to be transferred between the building and ships without disrupting road traffic. The railway closed in 1964 and in 1976, the Wells Harbour Railway was constructed to link the town with the beach and Pinewoods Holiday Park. It replaced a withdrawn bus service.

As part of the development of the Sheringham Shoal Offshore Wind Farm in the late 2000s the harbour and channel were dredged to allow wind farm maintenance vessels to be based there. A 150 metres (490 ft) pontoon jetty was also built; the work was completed early 2010.

== Approaches ==
Approaches to Wells can be made from Blakeney Overfalls, South Race, The Woolpack or Burnham Flats. Details on Imray Chart C28: The East Coast - Harwich to Wells-next-to Sea. A course should be made for Wells Leading Buoy, keeping to the port side of the marker for the deepest water over the sand bar. Vessels arriving from the East should come close to the buoy or pass it to port before turning for the harbour entrance rather than making directly for Buoys Number 1 and 2 in the channel. On arrival or prior to arrival at the leading Buoy it is advisable to contact the Harbourmaster for advice about the approaches. The Harbourmaster can be contacted on channel 12 (Wells Harbour). Depth at the entrance and at the quays is 3.04 metres to 3.66 at high water.

=== Channel Navigation ===
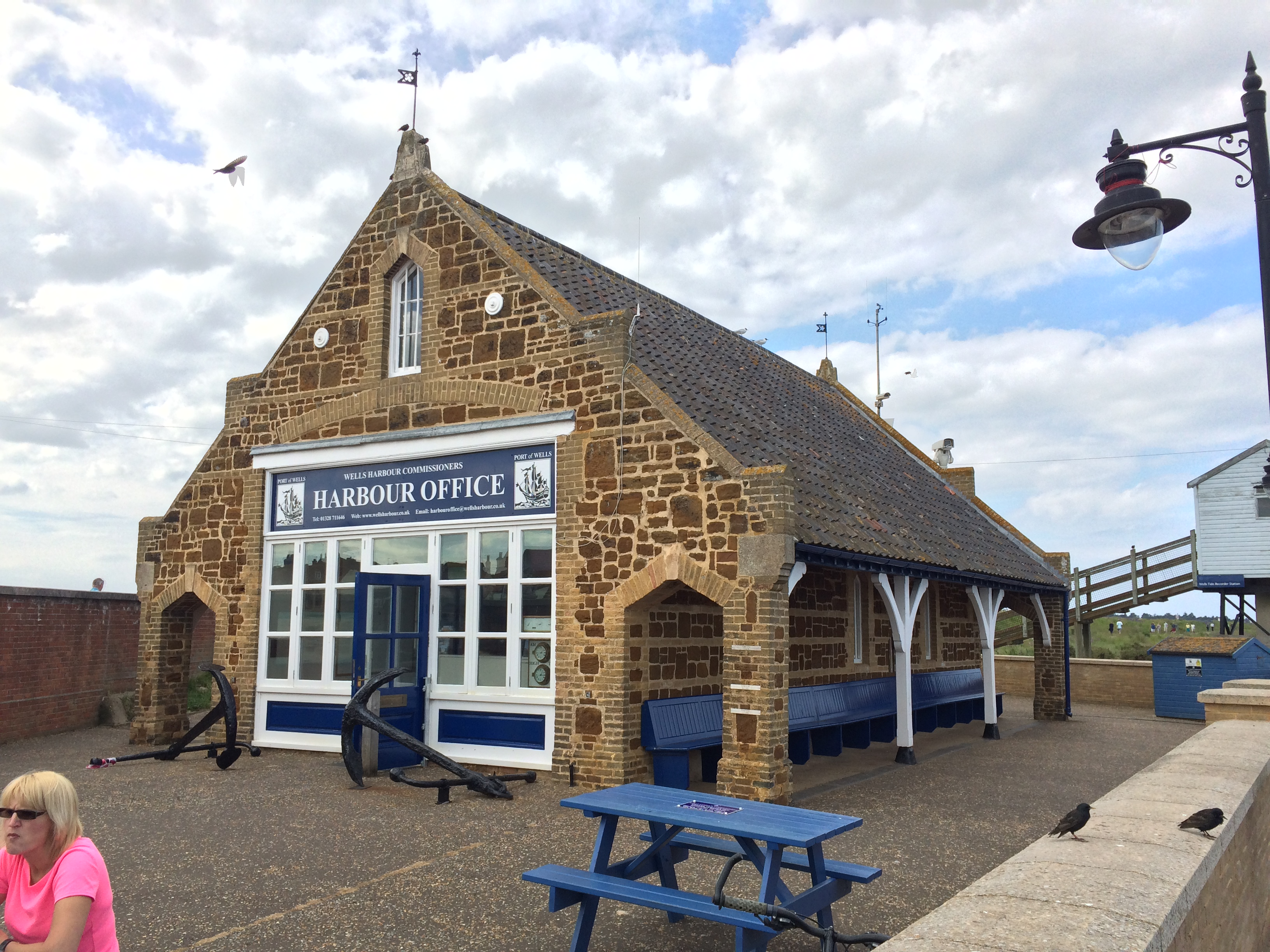
Port of Wells office building, housing the Wells Harbour Commissioners and the Harbourmaster

The channel over the bar and into the harbour changes from time to time although the established buoyage system on the channel can usually be relied on to stay constant. A look out should be made for temporary pellet buoys and beacons to show changes in the channel. 175 degrees in from the leading buoy is a large conical buoy Number 1 flashing green and the large red Number 2, can buoy flashing red on the bar itself are both visible in most weather conditions. It is advisable to make good a course between these buoys until the smaller buoys of the channel become visible, after which it is better to favour the starboard side because there is a considerable east going tidal stream across the harbour entrance from approximately two hours before every high water. From the starboard buoy No.9 known as the 'Knock', the channel bends away towards the South East into considerably quieter waters. The wide sweep to the eastward just past the lifeboat house must be made with the red beacons close to port as the channel is quite narrow at this point. On passing the green buoy named the 'Pool', turn to the South West and follow the buoys to the last red can buoy (Number 14) then arc back Easterly close to the marsh edge and follow the red beacons to the Quayside.

=== Draft ===
During Spring tides Vessels drawing up to 10 feet (3 m) can use the harbour at high water and vessels of up to 1.5 metres draft can look at entry two hours either side of high water. On neap tides the harbour may be entered by craft drawing up to 6 feet (1.75 m) at high water or at most one hour before or after high water.

== Wells Harbour Commissioners ==
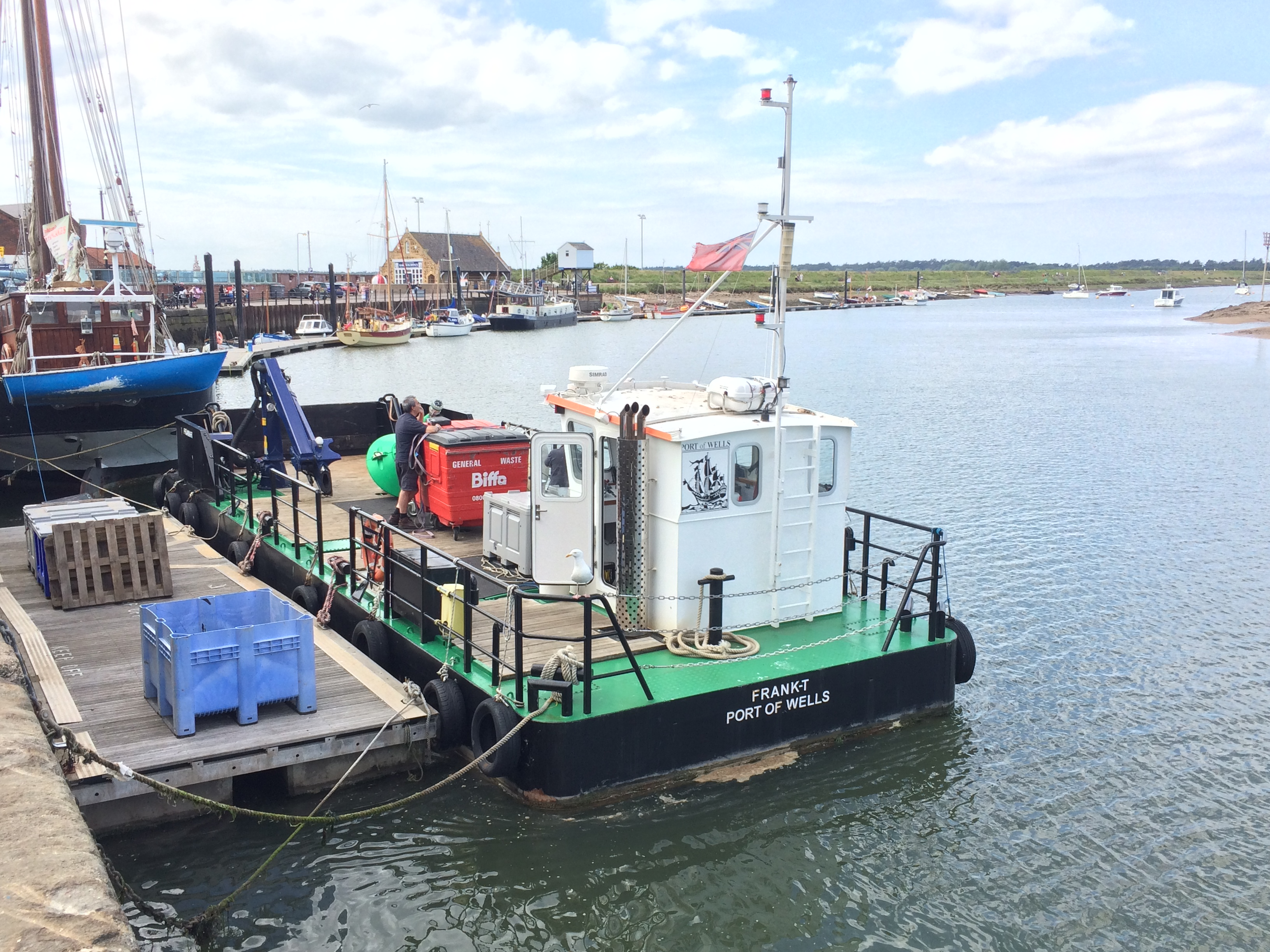
Port of Wells service vessel Frank-T in Wells Harbour

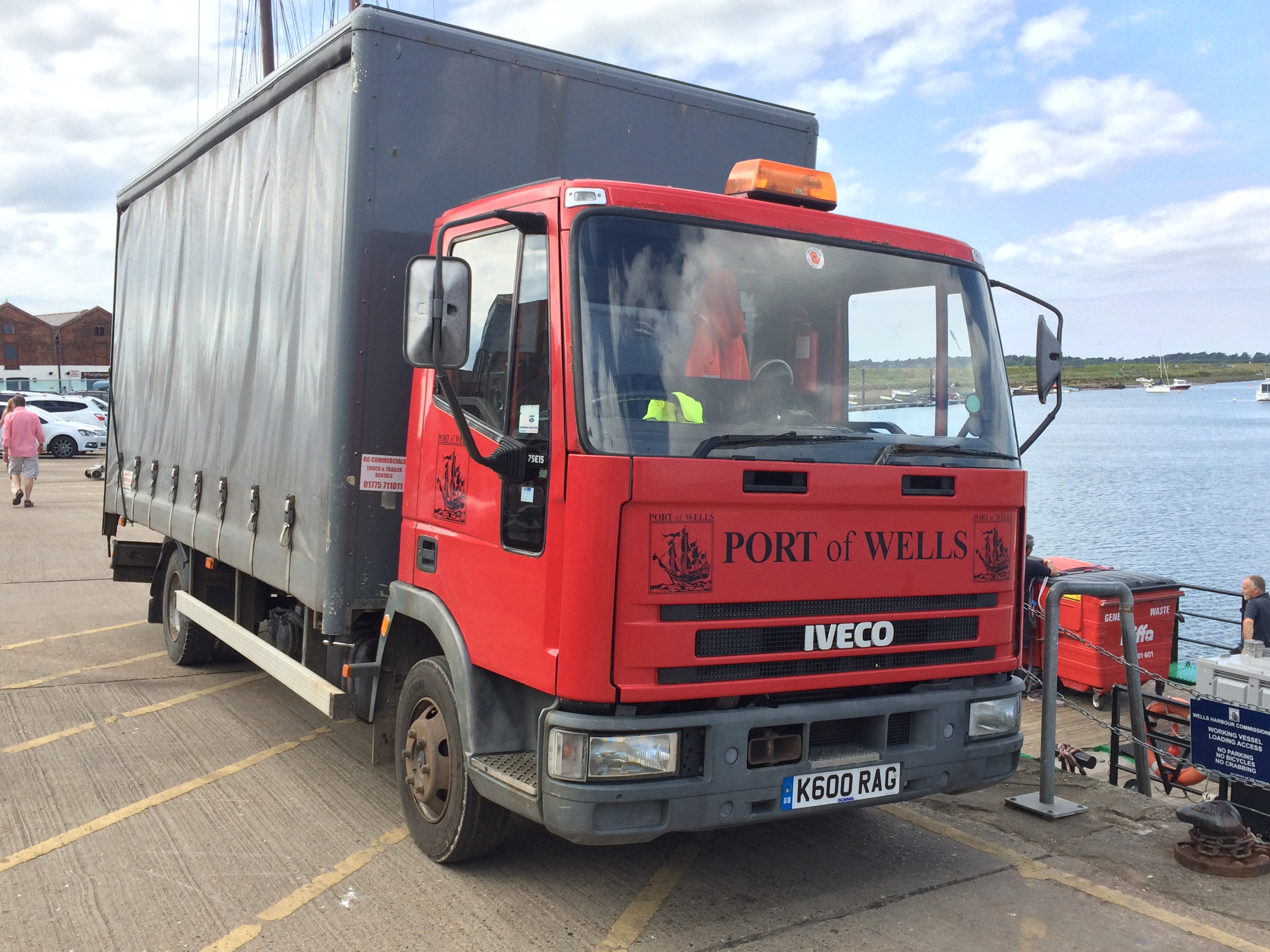
Port of Wells service vehicle on the quayside

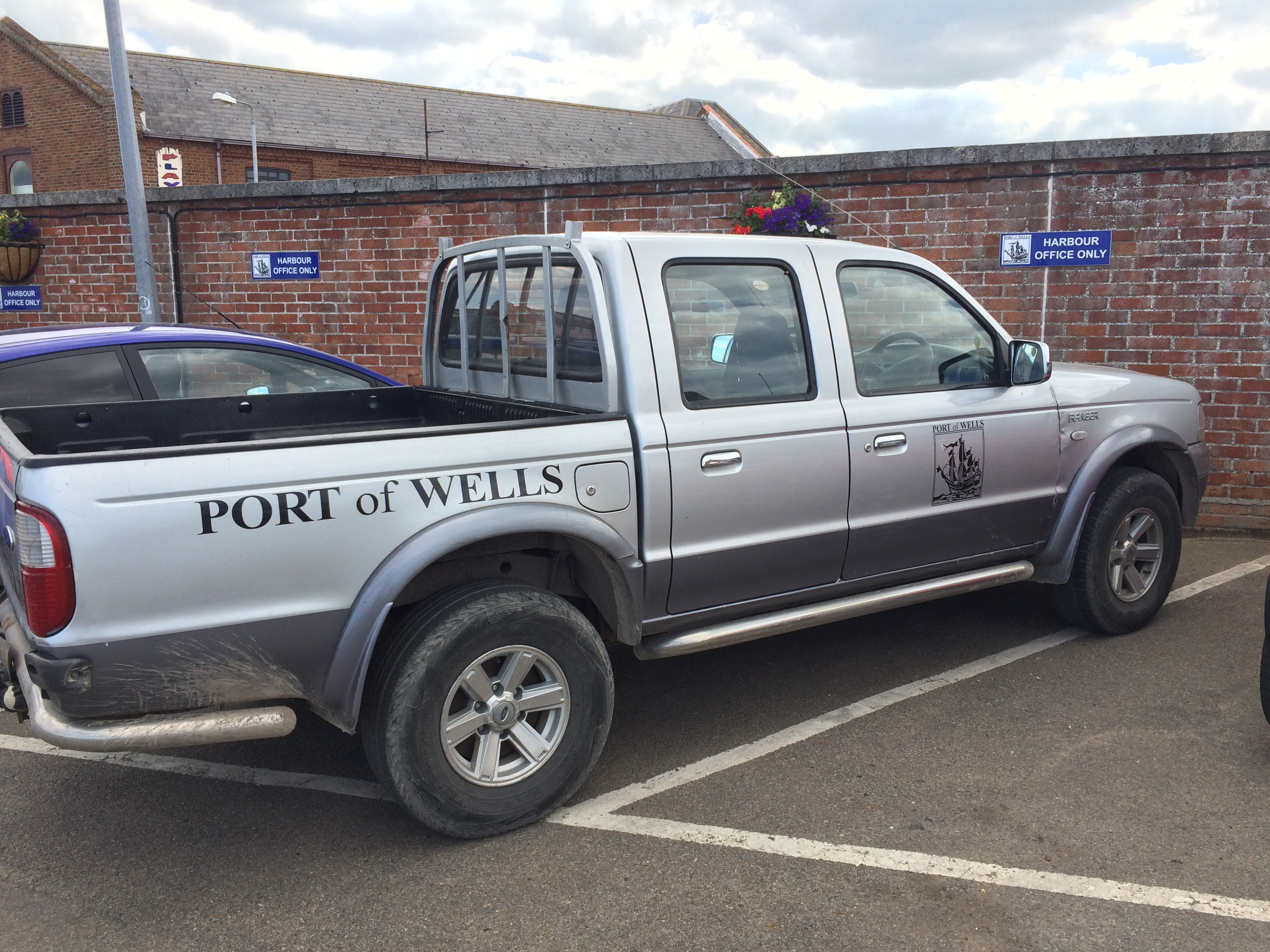
Port of Wells patrol vehicle near the Harbourmaster's office

Wells Harbour is legally administered by a panel of commissioners named the Wells Harbour Commissioners. The commissioners operate the harbour under the trading name Port of Wells, and they employ a Harbourmaster, three Deputy Harbourmasters, and a number of other staff including administrators, ships' crew, and both land-based and sea-based patrols. The commissioners came into being in 1663 under the Wells Harbour and Quay Act 1663 (15 Cha. 2. c. 5 Pr.), described as "an Act for repairing and better preserving the quay, creeks, channel and landing place of the Port of Wells in the County of Norfolk", and recently celebrated 350 years of operation. Under the title "Port of Wells" the commissioners currently operate six vessels and several land vehicles. The commissioners also operate a "Beach Patrol" of five uniformed officers who patrol the harbour, creek, and beach, offering advice, and preventing by-laws infringements.

=== Port of Wells service vessels ===
- Harbour Launch – the harbourmaster's launch, and general purpose vessel
- Kari Hege – heavy ocean-going motorised barge, with dredging equipment (24 m)
- Frank-T – navigational buoy vessel, and service vessel for the outer harbour (14 m, with 9 tonne crane)
- Tender-S – hopper barge, with dredging facilities (20 m)
- William-T – Atlantic 75 type fast inflatable RIB for use by the harbour patrol officers
- Beach Patrol – a 4.8m inshore RIB for beach patrol as a rescue and safety boat

The former 8.5m launch "Provider" has been withdrawn, with navigational aid duties taken over by Frank-T and escort duties by William-T.

== Quayside Facilities ==
Off Beach Road there are easy accessible pontoons available for mooring. The pontoons provide electricity hook ups and fresh water points. Fresh water is also provided on the main quay. There is a diesel refuelling berth available on the tide. On the quayside there are bulk disposal bins for refuse. There is also a facility for the disposal of used engine oil at the east end of the harbour. There are also toilet and shower facilities for the use of visiting crews along with a laundry. There is also a sewage pump-out point. The car parks are pay and display. Permits can be purchased for all these facilities from the harbour and information for pilotage and navigation in the area is also available.

=== Storage Facilities ===
Wells has a purpose-built secure outdoor compound with security surveillance which can be used year-round as well as for storage in the winter. The facility can be found at the east end behind the sea wall close to the slipway. There is 15 metres of quayside which are used for craning and hard standing. The site is covered by security lighting and there are electricity and water hook up points.

=== See also ===
- Wells-next-the-Sea Lifeboat Station
- Wells Harbour Railway
