= May Savidge =

British technical illustrator

- Born: May 25, 1911; Streatham, London
- Died: April 30, 1993 (aged 81); Wells-next-the-Sea, Norfolk
- Monuments: Ware Hall House
- Occupation: Technical illustrator

May Savidge (25 May 1911 – 30 April 1993) was a British technical illustrator who dismantled and rebuilt her medieval home to prevent it from being demolished.

== Early life and career ==
May Alice Savidge was born in Streatham, London in 1911. She lost both of her parents while still young, and her fiancé while still a teenager. Savidge went to night school and became an engineer, training as a draughtsman with De Havilland. There, she was the only woman who worked on the De Havilland Mosquito during World War II. Later, Savidge converted a river barge into a home.

== Ware Hall House ==
In 1947, Savidge purchased a semi-derelict property in Ware, Hertfordshire. During renovations, she discovered Tudor features, and learned the house was much older than initially thought, built in about 1450.

When the council issued a demolition order on thouse in the 1960s, to make way for a road and roundabout, Savidge decided to relocate the house brick by brick to Wells-next-the-Sea, Norfolk. She purchased a plot of land near the village green, and sought to enlist the help of both the Royal Air Force and the United States Air Force to transport the house's frame. When her requests were denied, Savidge hired seven lorries to move the house in its constituent parts.

Savidge spent one year dismantling the house, labelling every element and making sketches. As she worked to reconstruct the house in Norfolk, she lived in a beach caravan on the site.

In 1975, Savidge was interviewed as part of the BBC programme Nationwide, showing her at work on the house and describing her motivations. She was also featured on ThamesTV. Savidge never finished reconstructing the house, but lived there until her death in 1993. Her niece, Christine Adams, completed the work.

== Legacy ==
In 2007, the BBC's Antiques Roadshow broadcast two features on May Savidge.

Miss Savidge Moves Her House, written by Christine Adams and Michael McMahon, was published in 2010.

In 2025, an information board was placed in Ware near the home's original site, commemorating the house and the efforts of May Savidge.

The rights to Savidge's story have been bought in order to turn it into a film.
