= Wells-next-the-Sea =

Town and port in Norfolk, England

Coordinates: 52.95°N 0.85°E

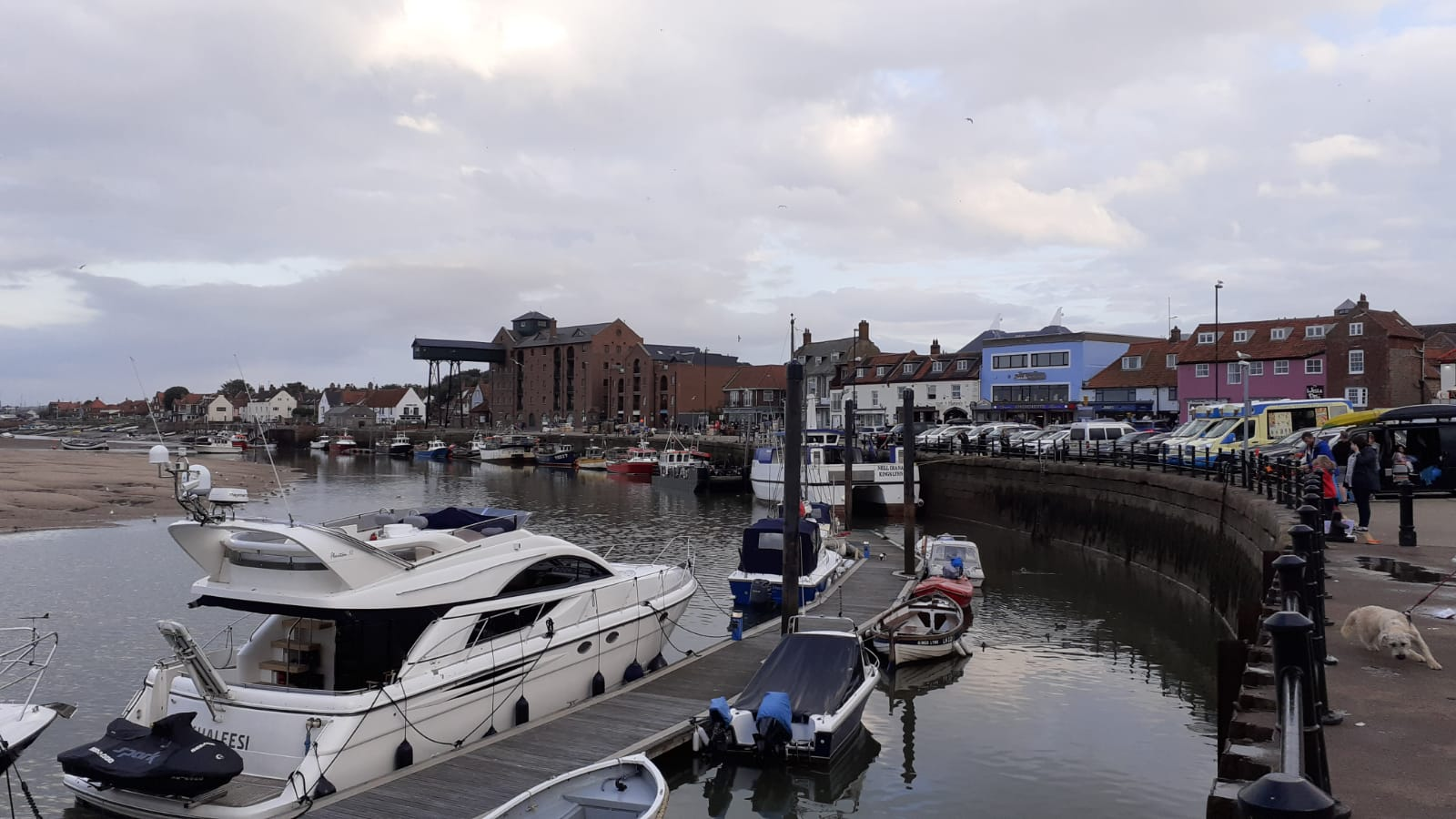
- The quayside

- Location within Norfolk
- Area: 16.31 km^{2} (6.30 sq mi)
- Population: 2,165 (2011 Census)
  - Density: 133/km^{2} (340/sq mi)
- OS grid reference: TF 914 430
- Civil parish: Wells-next-the-Sea
- District: North Norfolk
- Shire county: Norfolk
- Region: East
- Country: England
- Sovereign state: United Kingdom
- Post town: WELLS-NEXT-THE-SEA
- Postcode district: NR23
- Dialling code: 01328
- Police: Norfolk
- Fire: Norfolk
- Ambulance: East of England
- UK Parliament: North Norfolk

Wells-next-the-Sea is a port town and civil parish in the North Norfolk district, in the county of Norfolk, England.

The parish has an area of 16.31 km^{2} (6.30 sq mi) and in 2001 had a population of 2,451, reducing to 2,165 at the 2011 census.

It is on the north coast and is 15 miles (24 km) to the east of the resort Hunstanton, 20 miles (32 km) to the west of Cromer, and 10 miles (16 km) north of Fakenham. The city of Norwich lies 32 miles (51 km) to the south-east. Nearby villages include Blakeney, Burnham Market, Burnham Thorpe, Holkham and Walsingham.

== Origin of name ==
The name is Guella in the Domesday Book of 1086 (half gallicised, half Latinised from Anglian Wella, a spring). This derives from spring wells, of which Wells used to have many, rising through the chalk of the area. The town became Wells-next-the-Sea from juxta mare in the 14th century to distinguish it from other places of the same name. It appears as Wells Next the Sea (no hyphens) on the Ordnance Survey maps of 1838 and 1921. When the Wells and Fakenham Railway was opened on 1 December 1857, the terminus was given the name of Wells-on-Sea. In 1956 the Wells Urban District Council voted to re-adopt the name Wells-next-the-Sea, and this has been the official name since then.

== History ==
The town has been a seaport since before the 14th century, when it supplied grain to London and subsequently to the miners of the north east, in return for which Wells was supplied with coal. Until the 19th century, it was easier to carry bulk cargoes by sea than overland. It was a significant port in the 16th century, with 19 ships over 16 tons burden operating out of Wells in 1580, making it the major port in the area. It had been, since the beginning of the century, an exporter of grain and an importer of coal. Wells was also from early days a manufactory of malt. At its height, the town boasted up to twelve maltings which, in 1750, contributed a third of the exports of malt from the country, mostly to Holland, more than any other port save for Great Yarmouth.

Wells Harbour and Quay Act 1663
- Act of Parliament
- Parliament of England
- Long title: An Act for the repairing and better preserving the Key at the Port of Wells, in the County of Norfolke.
- Citation: 15 Cha. 2. c. 5 Pr.
- Territorial extent: England and Wales

Dates
- Royal assent: 27 July 1663
- Commencement: 18 February 1663 (Note: Start of session.)
- Repealed: 3 July 1835
Other legislation
Repealed by	Wells Harbour and Quay Act 1835

Status: Repealed

Wells Harbour and Quay Act 1769
- Act of Parliament
- Parliament of Great Britain
- Long title: An Act for repairing, improving, and better preserving, of the Harbour and Quay of Wells, in the County of Norfolk.
- Citation: 9 Geo. 3. c. 8
- Territorial extent: Great Britain

Dates
- Royal assent: 20 December 1768
- Commencement: 8 November 1768
- Repealed: 3 July 1835
Other legislation
Repealed by	Wells Harbour and Quay Act 1835

Status: Repealed

Text of statute as originally enacted

Wells Harbour and Quay Act 1835
- Act of Parliament
- Parliament of the United Kingdom
- Long title: An Act for more effectually repairing, improving, and preserving the Harbour and Quay of Wells in the County of Norfolk.
- Citation: 5 & 6 Will. 4. c. xlviii
- Territorial extent: United Kingdom

Dates
- Royal assent: 3 July 1835
- Commencement: 3 July 1835 (Note: The Acts of Parliament (Commencement) Act 1793.)
Other legislation
Repeals/revokes	Wells Harbour and Quay Act 1663; Wells Harbour and Quay Act 1769
Amended by	Wells Harbour and Quay Act 1844; Wells Harbour Revision Order 1994

Status: Partially repealed

Wells Harbour and Quay Act 1844
- Act of Parliament
- Parliament of the United Kingdom
- Long title: An Act for improving the Harbour and Quay of Wells in the County of Norfolk; and for extending and altering some of the Provisions of the Act relating to the said Harbour and Quay.
- Citation: 7 & 8 Vict. c. xciii
- Territorial extent: United Kingdom

Dates
- Royal assent: 29 July 1844
- Commencement: 29 July 1844
Other legislation
Amends	Wells Harbour and Quay Act 1835
Amended by	Wells Harbour Revision Order 1994

Status: Partially repealed

Wells Harbour Revision Order 1994
- Statutory Instrument
- Parliament of the United Kingdom
- Citation: SI 1994/1440
- Territorial extent: United Kingdom

Dates
- Made: 23 May 1994
- Commencement: 28 May 1994
Other legislation
Amends	Wells Harbour and Quay Act 1835; Wells Harbour and Quay Act 1844
Made under	Harbours Act 1964

Text of statute as originally enacted

Wells (Norfolk) Improvement Act 1844
- Act of Parliament
- Parliament of the United Kingdom
- Long title: An Act for lighting, paving, cleansing, widening, and improving the Streets of the Town or Parish of Wells in the County of Norfolk; for removing and preventing Nuisances therein; and for making new Streets or Roadways.
- Citation: 7 & 8 Vict. c. xciv
- Territorial extent: United Kingdom

Dates
- Royal assent: 29 July 1844
- Commencement: 29 July 1844

Wells was also a fishing port: in 1337, it is recorded as having had thirteen fishing boats and nearby Holkham had nine. Its mariners brought first herring and then cod from Iceland in quantity between the 15th and 17th centuries. The regulation of the harbour in order to preserve its use was by an act of Parliament, the Wells Harbour and Quay Act 1663 (15 Cha. 2. c. 5 Pr.); harbour commissioners were appointed by the Wells Harbour and Quay Act 1769 (9 Geo. 3. c. 8) with powers over vessels entering and leaving (as they still have today). The quay was substantially rebuilt in 1845, as part of attempts to improve the town. At the same time, improvement commissioners were appointed by the Wells (Norfolk) Improvement Act 1844 (7 & 8 Vict. c. xciv) with the task of making the town commodious and attractive to residents and the burgeoning tourist trade. As a small port, it built ships until the late 19th century; it never transferred to building motor vessels or to steel hulls. The coming of the railway in 1857 reduced the harbour trade, but it revived briefly after the Second World War for the import of fertiliser and animal feed. In 1982, there were 258 ship movements into the harbour.

Wells relies on the tides to scour the harbour because the town does not have a river running through it. The problem of siltation had preoccupied the merchants of the town for hundreds of years and occupied the attentions of various engineers, leading eventually to disputes which came to court in the 18th century. Sir John Coode, who had been knighted for his work on the completion of Portland Harbour, was recruited to solve its siltation problems in the 1880s; no attempted solution proved permanent. The growth of faster marine traffic, whose wake washes at the banks of the marshes, has widened the channel and reduced tidal flow further.

The North Sea is now a mile from the town; the main channel which once wandered through marshes, grazed by sheep for hundreds of years, was confined by earthworks to the west in 1859 when Holkham Estate reclaimed some 800 hectares of saltmarsh north-west of Wells with the building of a mile-long bank. This reclamation was claimed to have reduced the tidal scour though the West Fleet, which provided much of the water entered the channel to its north.

In the 19th century, malting assumed an industrial character dominated by merchants rather than hands-on maltsters. Eventually, the entire estate was acquired by F. & G. Smith who had maltings in Dereham and Great Ryburgh; they latterly bought out the competition becoming one of the biggest maltsters in the country. Following the First World War, demand began to fall and new methods of production were being used. After a local dispute, they closed the Wells operation down in 1929. Other agriculture-related enterprises, such as the local flour mill and the Ipswich-based Eastern Counties Farmers Cooperative, were, over the following years, bought out or closed. The post-war revival of the harbour trade made the quay a busy place from the 1960s to the 1990s. Small coasters, mostly from across the English Channel, brought in fertiliser and animal feed, latterly mostly soya beans until 1992 when changes in government regulations and the increasing size of vessels made the port uneconomic. Wind-farm support began in 2009, with the building of the Sheringham Shoal Offshore Wind Farm. The transfer of operations to Yarmouth, on the closure of the facility in Wells in 2021, repeated the long-term pattern of opportunity and reversal in the town.

Tourism, which had begun on a small scale a century before, became a major draw; it was based on the Pinewoods Caravan site much expanded post-war first by the Town Council and subsequently by Holkham Estates. As with many coastal towns, the number of second homes resultant on the tourist trade has increased dramatically over the last few years, reaching over 34% in 2019.

== Geography ==
The town has long thrived as a seaport and is now also a seaside resort with a popular beach that can be reached on foot or by car. (The narrow-gauge railway, built in 1976, that ran partway alongside the mile-long sea wall north of the harbour closed in 2021). The beach is known for its long flat terrain, abstract sand dunes, varied beach huts and a naturist area situated to the west at Holkham. A landlocked brackish pool called Abraham's Bosom was for many years used for pleasure boating and canoeing; it is all that remains of the West Fleet which once drained the Holkham marshes. The beach is backed by dense pine woods which are part of the Holkham National Nature Reserve. The woods comprise Scots pine, Maritime pine and Corsican Pine growing on sand.

More pinewoods exist to the east of the beach over the shipping channel at an area called the East Hills. This can be accessed on foot at low tide though all of the tidal sands in the area are extremely dangerous due to the speed and currents of the rising tide. It is not advisable to cross the channel without detailed local knowledge.

The majority of shops and other such businesses are now found on Staithe Street but up to the 1960s commercial premises were also to be found along High Street which continues south towards St Nicholas's Church. The church burned down after a lightning strike in 1879; the exterior shows the original stonework, but the interior, while light and airy, lacks stained glass, once found. The Victorian bench ends are worth a look. John Fryer, Captain Bligh's sailing master on HMS Bounty, was born at Wells and is buried in the churchyard. His gravestone is in the church porch.

The distinctive landmark of the seafront is the granary with its overhanging gantry on the quay, started in 1904 and finished in 1905. This has now been converted into flats, having ceased operating as a granary in 1990. The maritime tradition of the town meant it used to have a remarkable number of public houses for a town of its size although many of these have since closed. The northern end of the town used to be notable for parallel 'yards', narrow rows of cottages similar to the northern 'ginnels', which may derive from the rebuilding of the port in the eleventh century. (The original port is reputed to have been adjacent to the church.) Most of these remain though some have been lost to development and slum clearance. The North Sea flood of 1953 affected the northern edge of the town, breaching the beach bank and causing damage to houses on both east and west ends of the town. It also destroyed the Pinewoods caravan site. The pines themselves, which had been planted in the nineteenth century to stabilise the dunes and which fringed Abraham's Bosom, survived. Today there is a large moving floodgate next to the harbour car park and many of the houses have their own flood defences. It proved its worth in December 2013 when a flood exceeded both the 1953 and 1978 events, holding back the waters so that the west end of the town was unaffected.

A feature of the town is the area known as The Buttlands, a large green ringed by lime trees. Large elegant Georgian houses overlook The Buttlands, as do the Crown Hotel, Globe Inn and the Wells Catholic Church. If one exits The Buttlands down the hill at its south-west corner they can see Ware Hall, a 15th-century house which was rebuilt over a period of years from 1969 by May Savidge, who brought it in parts when she moved from Ware, Hertfordshire.

=== Beach ===
The Wells-next-the-Sea beach, being subject to the ever-changing tides of Holkham National Nature Reserve, makes use of an old war siren to warn patrons of incoming beach floodings. The siren sounds around 5–10 minutes before the tide is predicted to take over the beach to allow users to vacate the area safely.

=== Storms ===
Wells has been subjected to flooding going back to the thirteenth century. In the twentieth century, the notorious 1953 floods were followed by a surge almost as dangerous in 1978, for which the town was better prepared. On 5 December 2013, a storm surge occurred which caused severe damage to the properties on the Quay and to the east; it did not affect the west end of the town because of a tidal barrier built in 1982. The Prime Minister, David Cameron, visited the town on 9 December 2013 to inspect the damage caused by flooding.

== Governance ==
There are three tiers of local government covering Wells-next-the-Sea, at parish (town), district, and county level: Wells-next-the-Sea Town Council, North Norfolk District Council, and Norfolk County Council. The town council has its offices at the Wells Community Hospital on Mill Road, on the western outskirts of the town.

Wells-next-the-Sea
- Improvement Commissioners District (1844–1894); Urban District (1894–1974)
- Population
  - 1891: 2,555
  - 1971: 2,245
- History
  - Created: 1844 (Improvement Commissioners District); 31 December 1894 (Urban District)
  - Abolished: 31 March 1974
  - Succeeded by: North Norfolk
  - HQ: Wells-next-the-Sea
- Contained within
  - County Council: Norfolk

Wells-next-the-Sea was an ancient parish within the hundred of North Greenhoe. Until 1844 the parish was governed by its vestry, in the same way as most rural parishes. In 1844 an act of parliament established improvement commissioners to look after the secular aspects of local government in the town.

Under the Local Government Act 1894 the improvement commissioners were replaced by an elected urban district council. Until 1954 the urban district council was based at the offices of the solicitor who acted as clerk to the council, at the corner of Chancery Lane and The Buttlands. In 1954 the council bought the former Park Cinema at 62 Mill Road for £1,600 and converted it to become their offices and meeting place, holding their first meeting there in December 1954.

The urban district council was abolished in 1974 under the Local Government Act 1972, with the area becoming part of North Norfolk. A successor parish was established to cover the former urban district, with its council adopting the name Wells-next-the-Sea Town Council. The former council offices at 62 Mill Road were subsequently redeveloped for housing in the 1990s.

== Transport ==
=== Railways ===
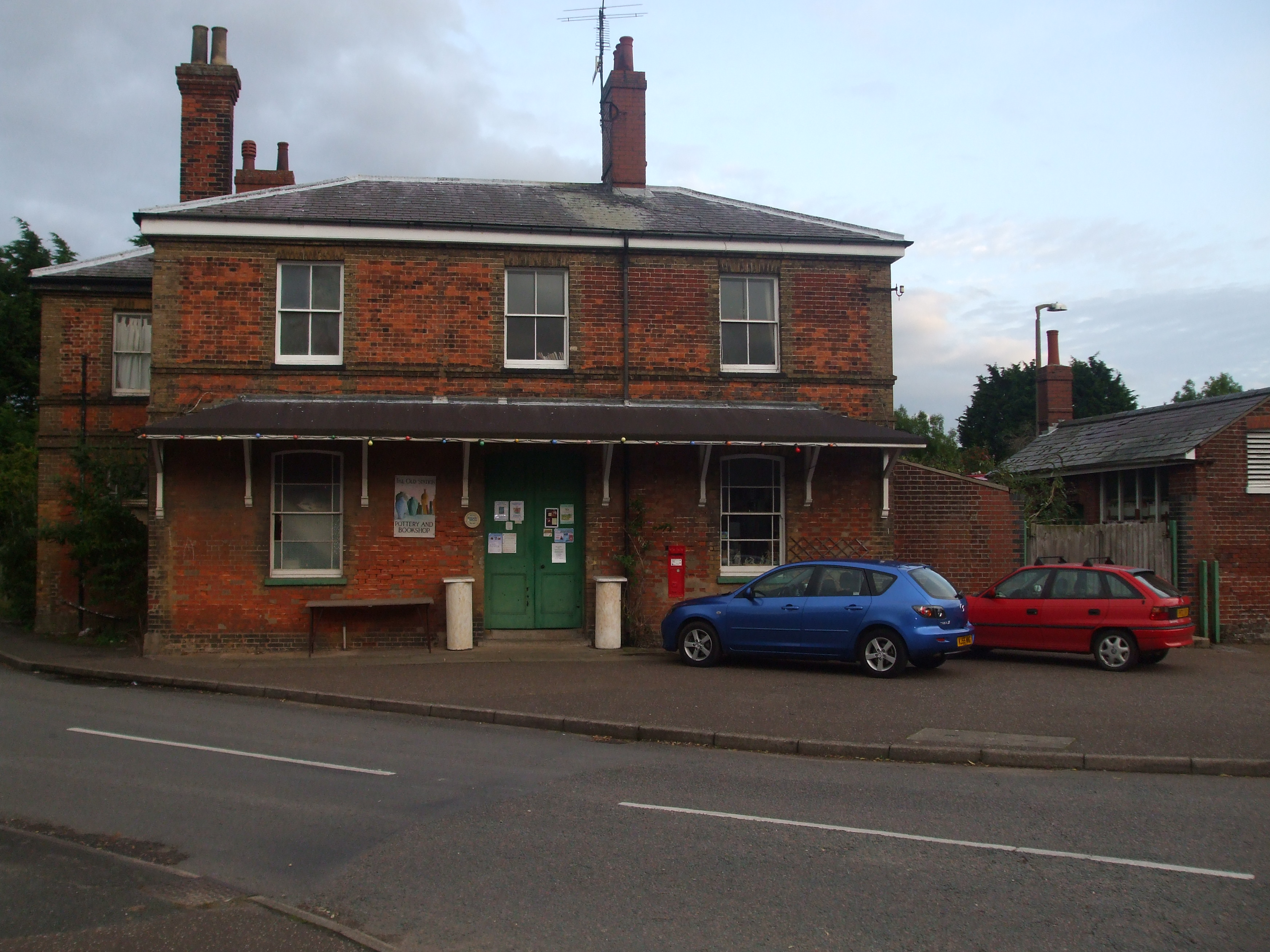
The former Wells-next-the-Sea station in 2007

The coming of the railway in 1857 notably reduced the town's population, as mentioned in the 1861 census. Formerly, the town was served by Wells-on-Sea railway station and was connected to the British Rail network by two lines. The line westwards towards King's Lynn was never reinstated after damage in the North Sea flood of 1953, while the line to Norwich via Fakenham, Dereham and Wymondham was a victim of the "Beeching Axe" of the 1960s. The Wells and Walsingham Light Railway, a 10¼ inch-gauge railway (the longest of such a gauge in the world), now uses part of the track-bed and has its own separate Wells railway station.

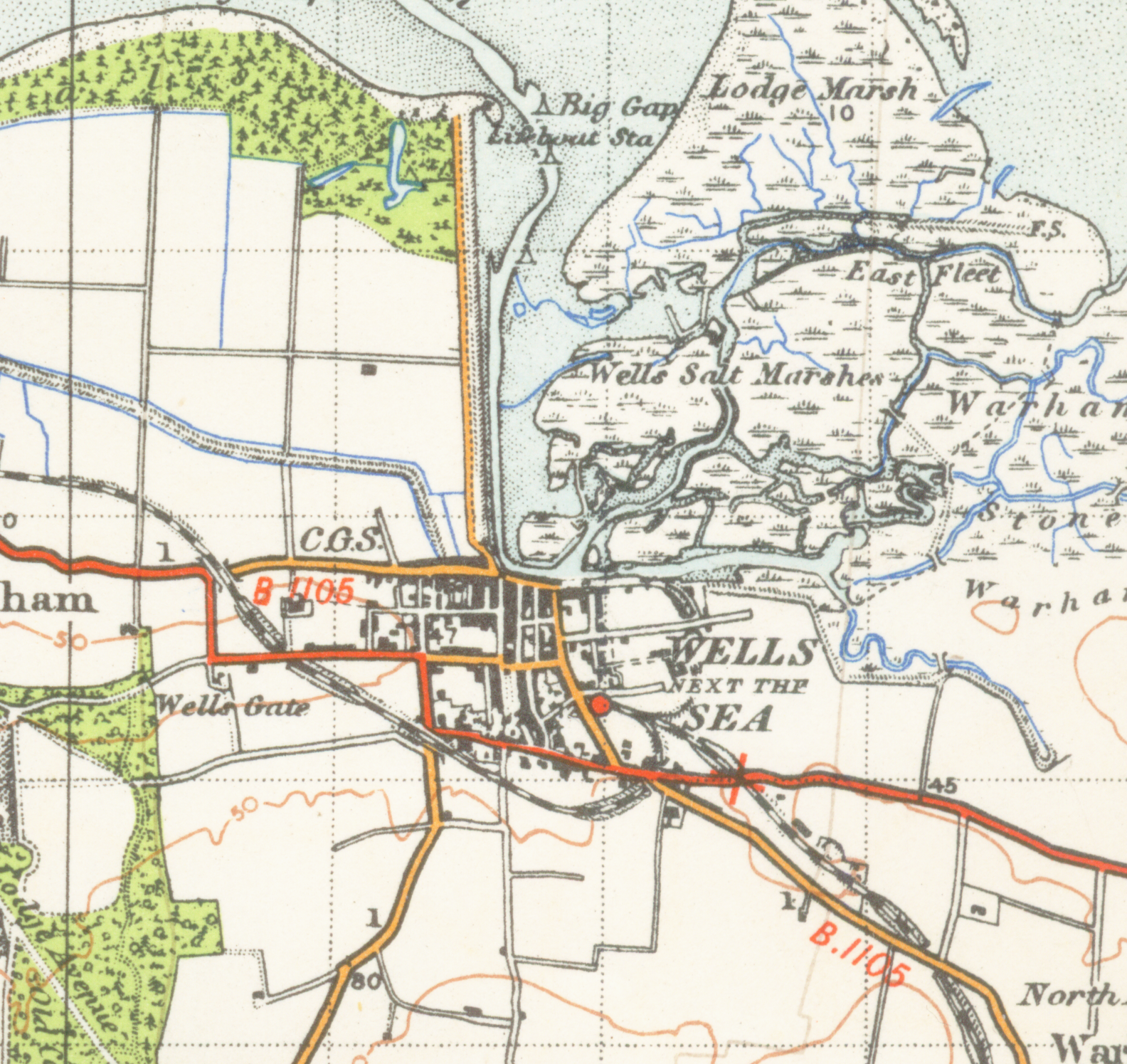
A map of Wells-next-the-Sea from 1946

In addition to the two passenger railway routes in and out of the town, there was a tramway from the station to the quayside at Wells Harbour, whose rails are still visible today just beneath the modern road surface along East Quay. Locomotives were not allowed along the quay and wagons were hauled by horses. The line continued in a curve to the south-east to connect with the lines at Wells station and the track bed can be walked.

The Wells Harbour Railway was a separate 10¼ inch-gauge railway that took passengers from the harbour behind the sea wall towards the beach and caravan site. It was in operation from 1976 to 2021, when the lines were taken up.

=== Buses ===
Wells was located on the high-profile Coasthopper bus route between King's Lynn and Cromer, run by Norfolk Green. The operation was handed over to Stagecoach in 2015 but, in April 2018, Stagecoach ceased operations in Norfolk. The Coasthopper service was split into two sections at Wells-next-the-Sea: the section from King's Lynn to Wells was rebranded as the Coastliner 36, extended inland from Wells to Fakenham and taken over by Lynx; the section from Wells to Cromer was taken over by Sanders Coaches.

== Lifeboat ==
The new Wells-next-the-Sea Lifeboat Station, replacing one which had stood since 1899, was opened in 2022 to house the new Shannon-class lifeboat named the Duke of Edinburgh, which came on station in October. It replaced the Mersey-class boat, Doris Mann of Ampthill, which had served since 1990, making it then the longest serving lifeboat in the fleet. The old lifeboat station, which was the subject of some support for its retention, was demolished immediately thereafter. A new longer launch slipway was built at the same time, with a new tractor and trailer obtained. This is necessary for the retrieval of the boat after a call-out and, if there is a call-out when the tide is out, a response can only be made by taking the boat across over a mile of sand for launch in Holkham bay. An Atlantic-class, rigid inflatable inshore boat is used for callouts along the coast; it has proved itself by responding to an increasing number of people cut off by the tide and carried out to sea while swimming or using paddleboards and inflatables.

The earlier lifeboat house, built in the 1860s and now used as the harbour office, is at the western end of the quay.

In 1880, during the Wells lifeboat disaster, eleven of the thirteen crew drowned, leaving ten widows and 27 children without fathers. A memorial to the crew stands adjacent to the old lifeboat house.

== Education ==
Various charity schools in the town included that set up by Christopher Ringer in 1678 when he left £600 in his will for the education of thirty boys and thirty girls in the town. A number of academies were established in the nineteenth century; none of these survive. A National School was set up following the closure of the town workhouse. A British School was set up in 1938 which became a Board School in 1875. A secondary school was built in 1929 when the original school became the primary school. In 1963 the Alderman Peel secondary modern school was built in a different part of town adjacent to the old Heacham railway line. The old school buildings were used for some years as a field studies centre but have now been converted to social housing units administered by Homes for Wells, a community led housing association. Wells schools are now part of the Wensum Trust which administers 24 schools in Norfolk.

== Media ==
The town receives television signals from the Belmont TV transmitter which broadcast BBC Yorkshire and Lincolnshire and ITV Yorkshire programmes and the local relay transmitter that broadcast BBC East and ITV Anglia which is transmitted from the Tacolneston TV transmitter.

Local radio stations are BBC Radio Norfolk, Heart East, Amber Radio, Greatest Hits Radio East (formerly North Norfolk Radio), and Poppyland Community Radio, a community based station.

Local newspapers are Fakenham & Wells Times, North Norfolk News and Eastern Daily Press.

== Gallery ==
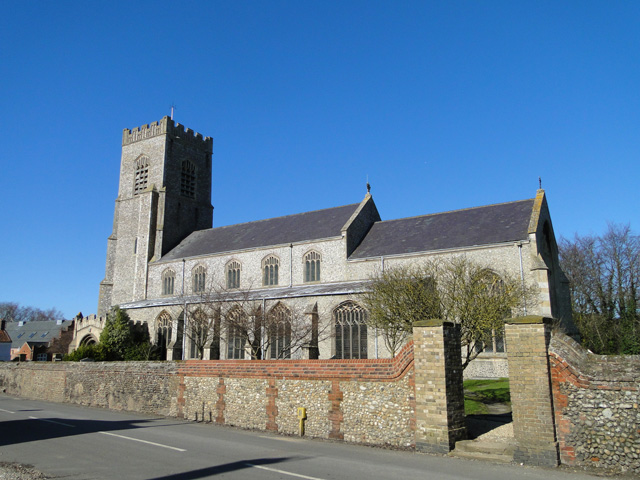
The parish church of St Nicholas

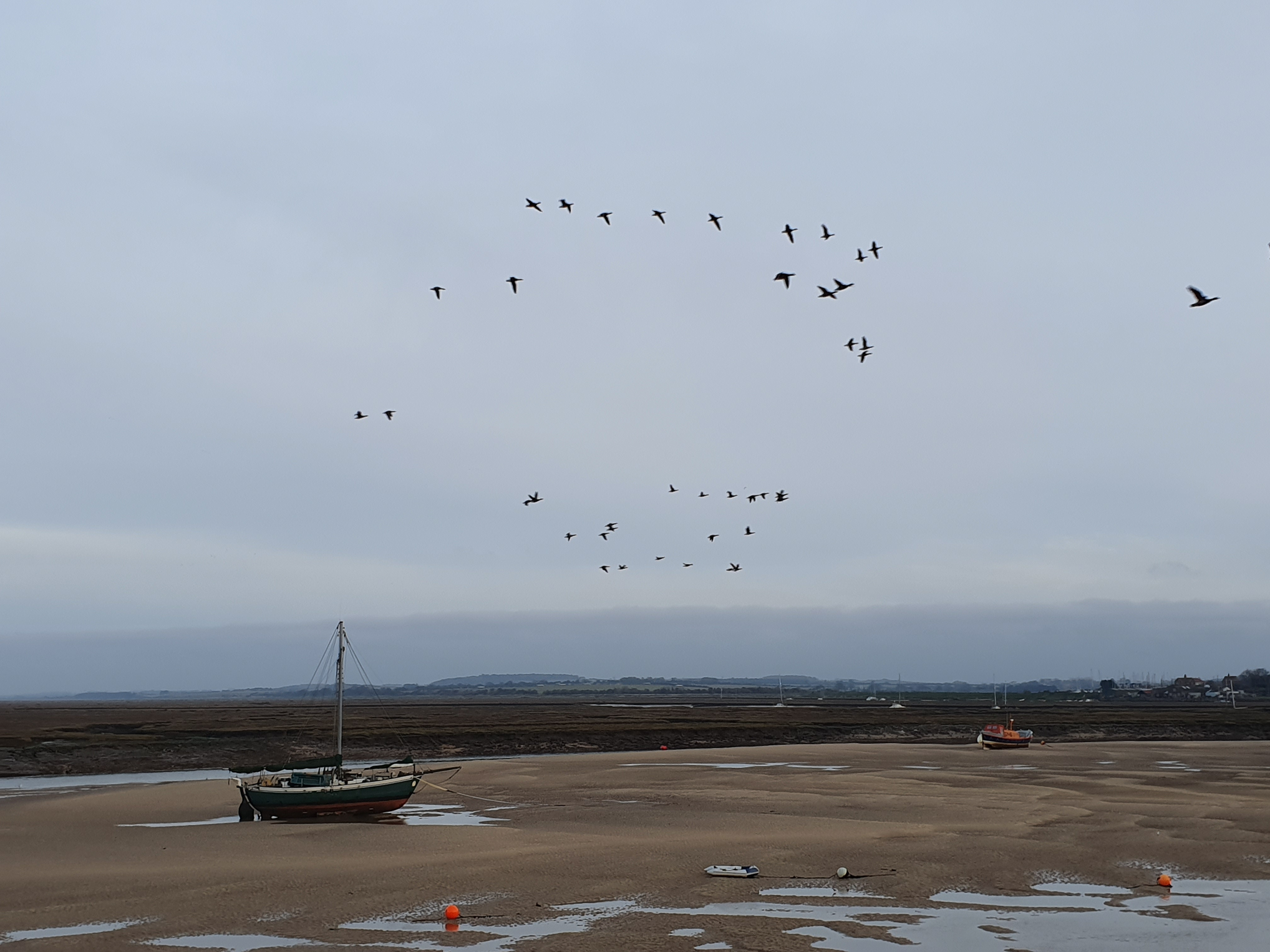
Beached boat at Wells-next-the-Sea

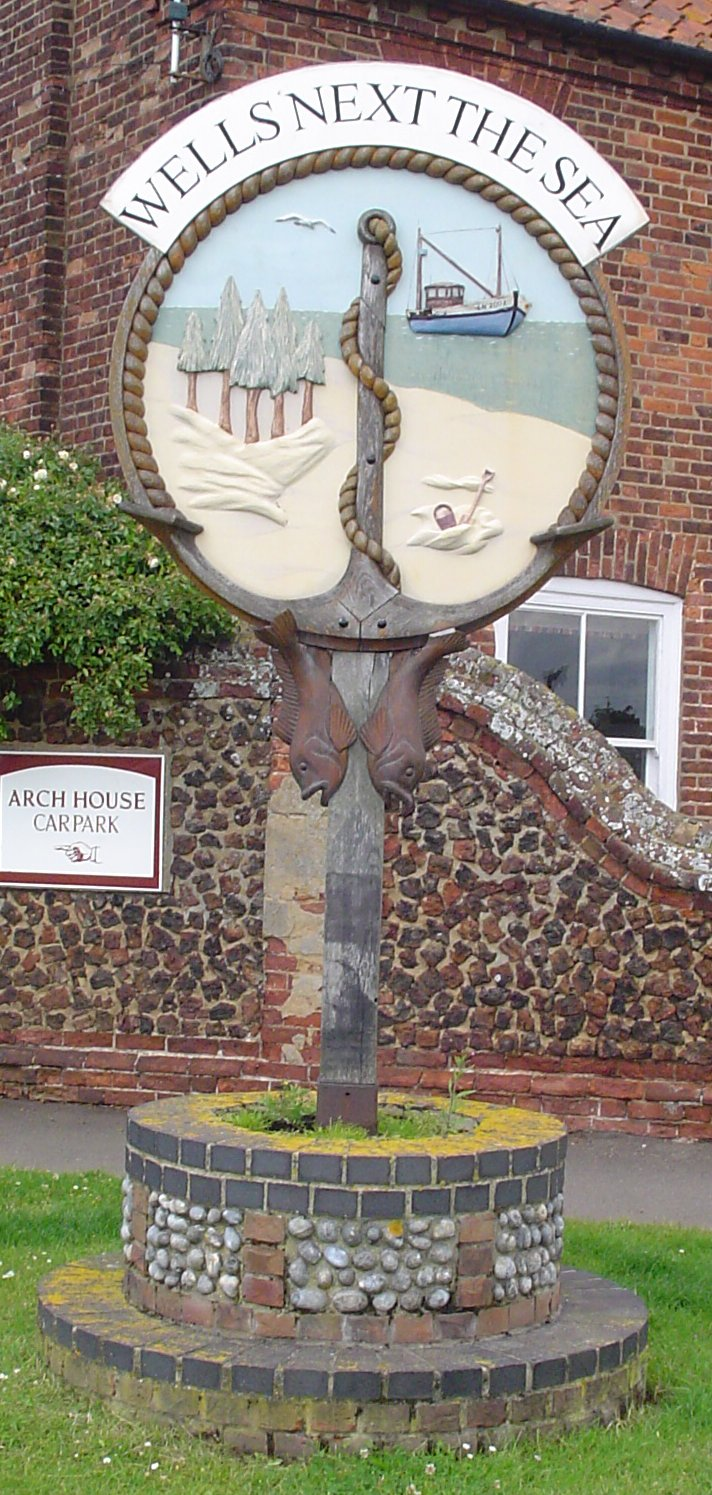
Signpost in Wells-next-the-Sea

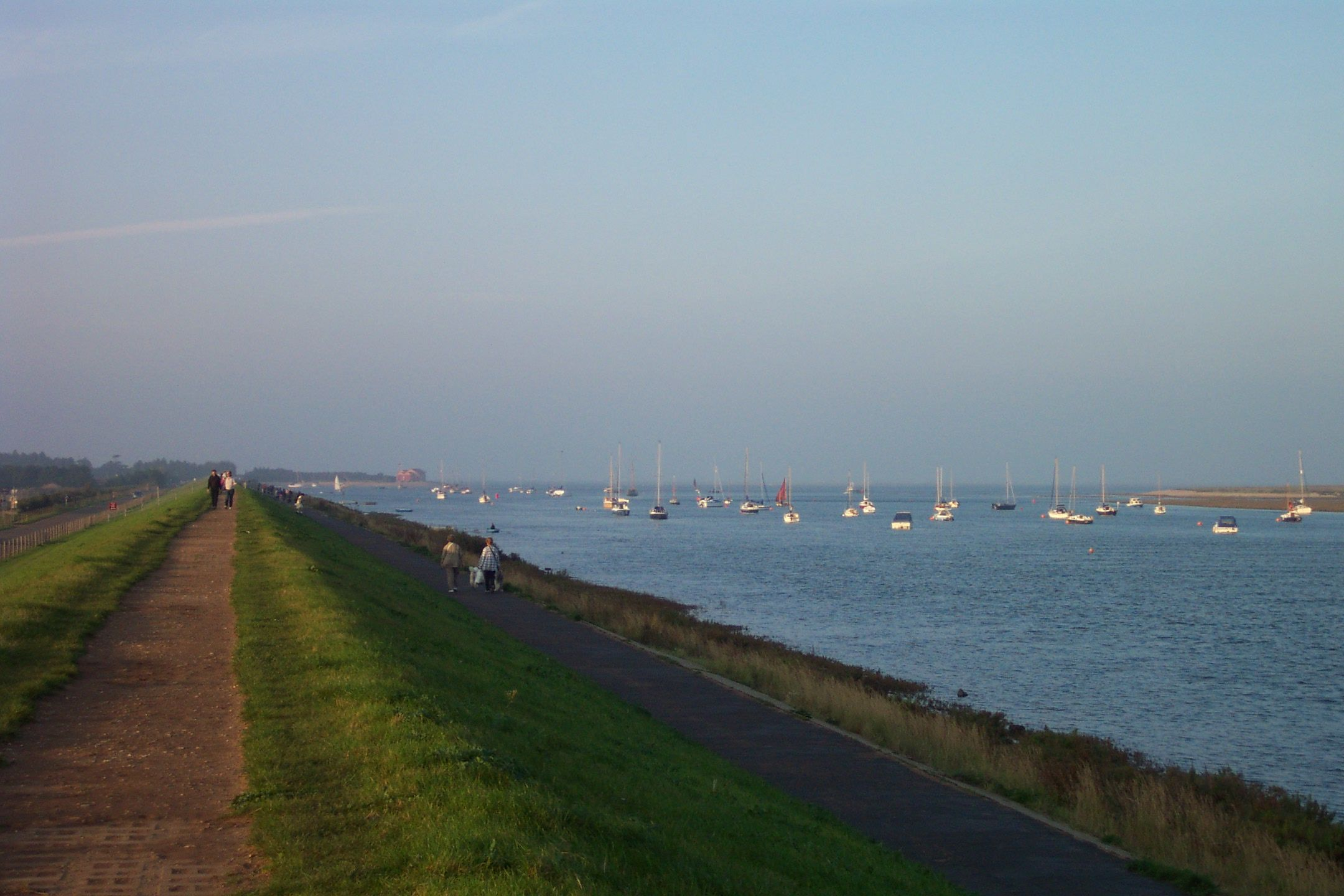
The Wells Harbour mouth from the sea wall; the lifeboat house can be seen in the distance

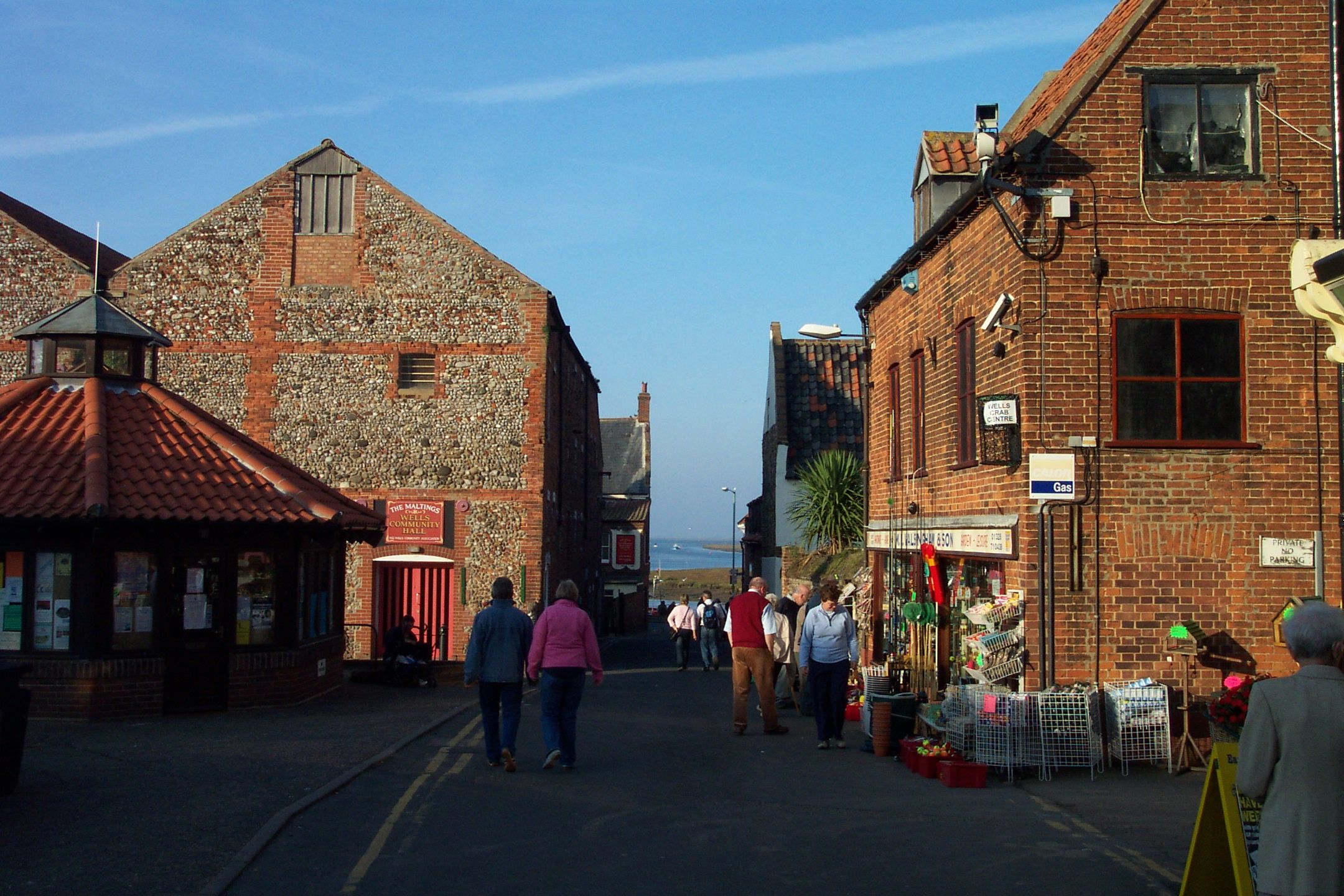
Inland Wells, with view to Wells Harbour

Looking out to the quay on a sunny August 2006 day

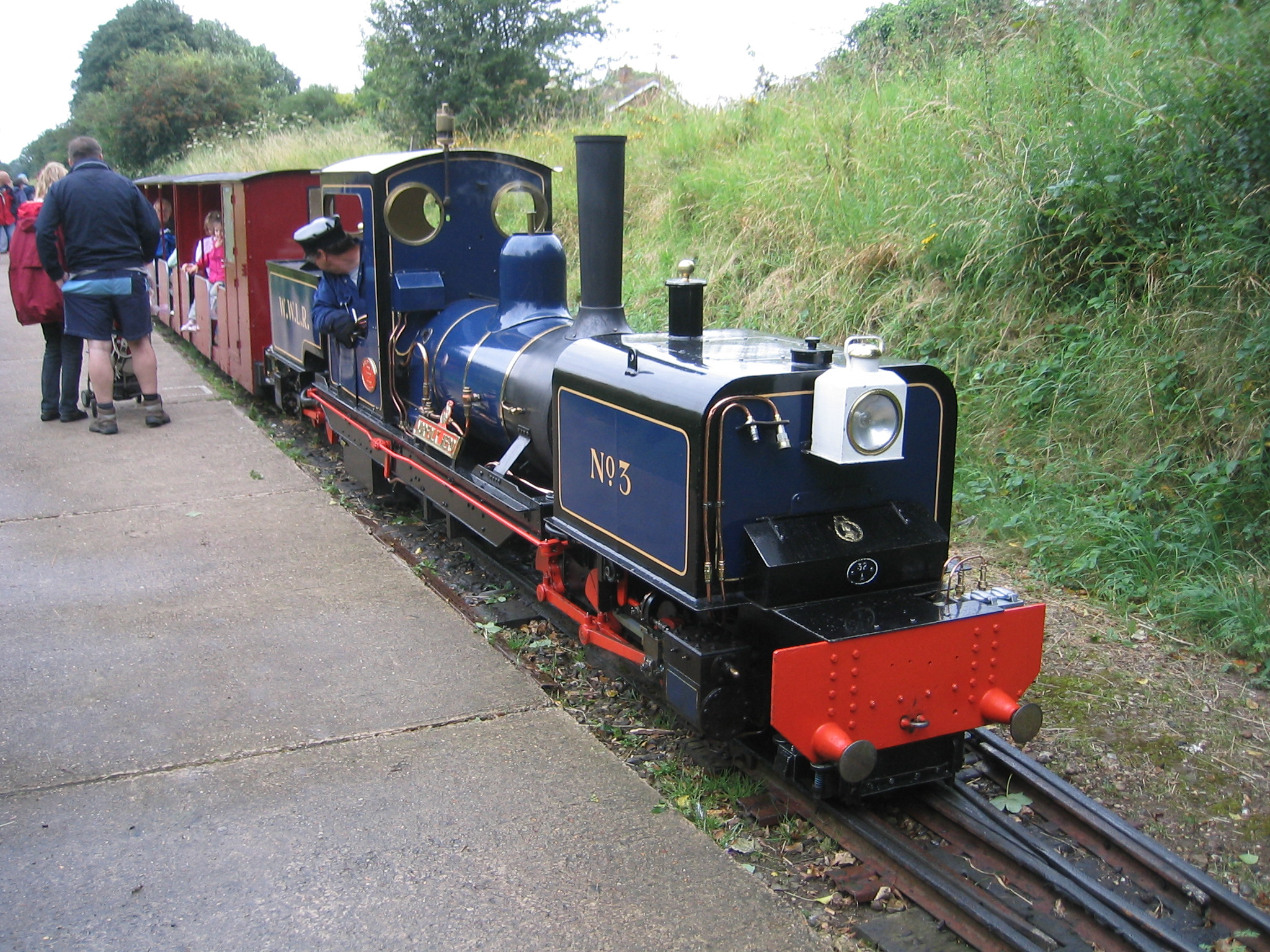
The train from Wells arrives at Walsingham station

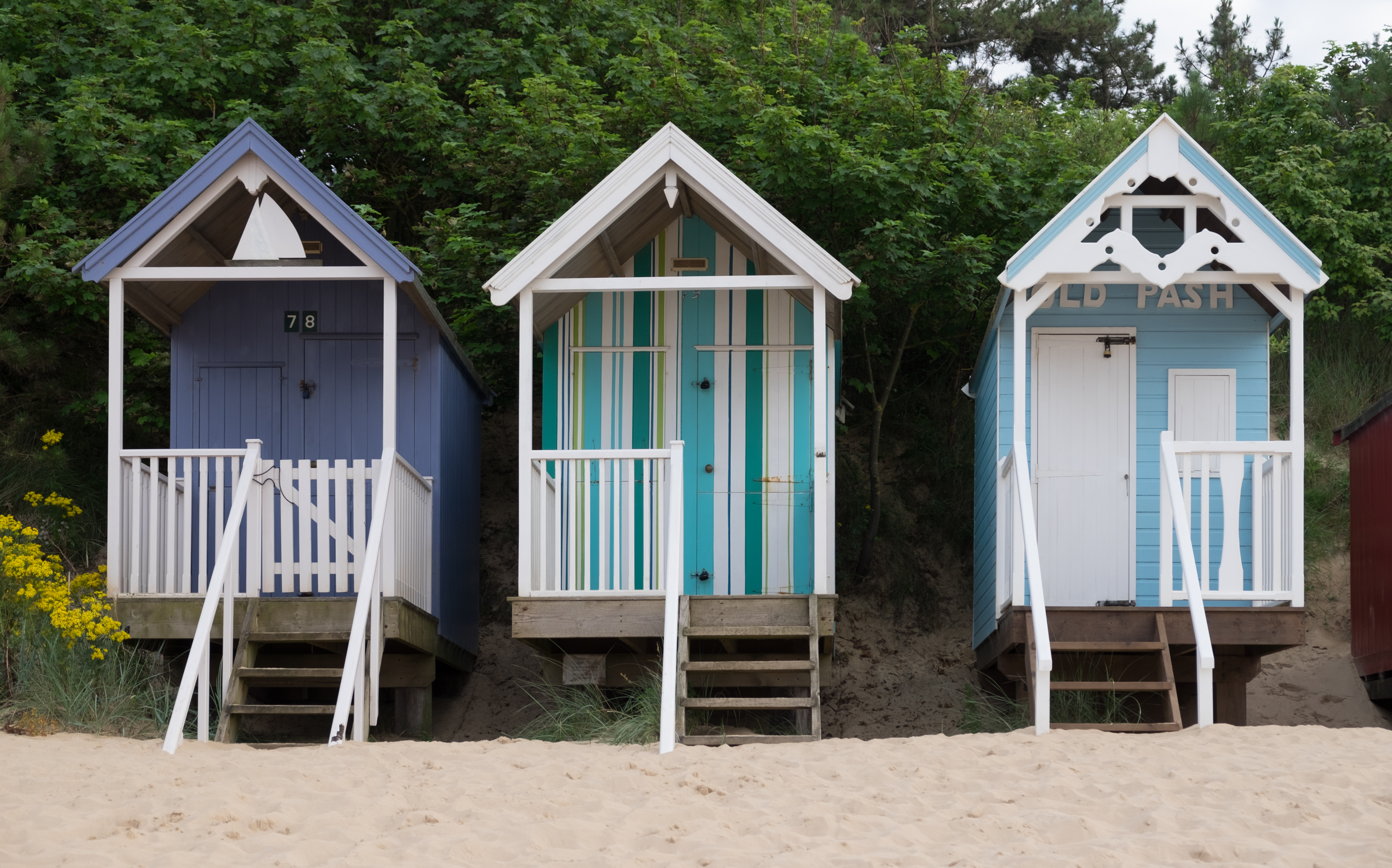
Huts on the beach

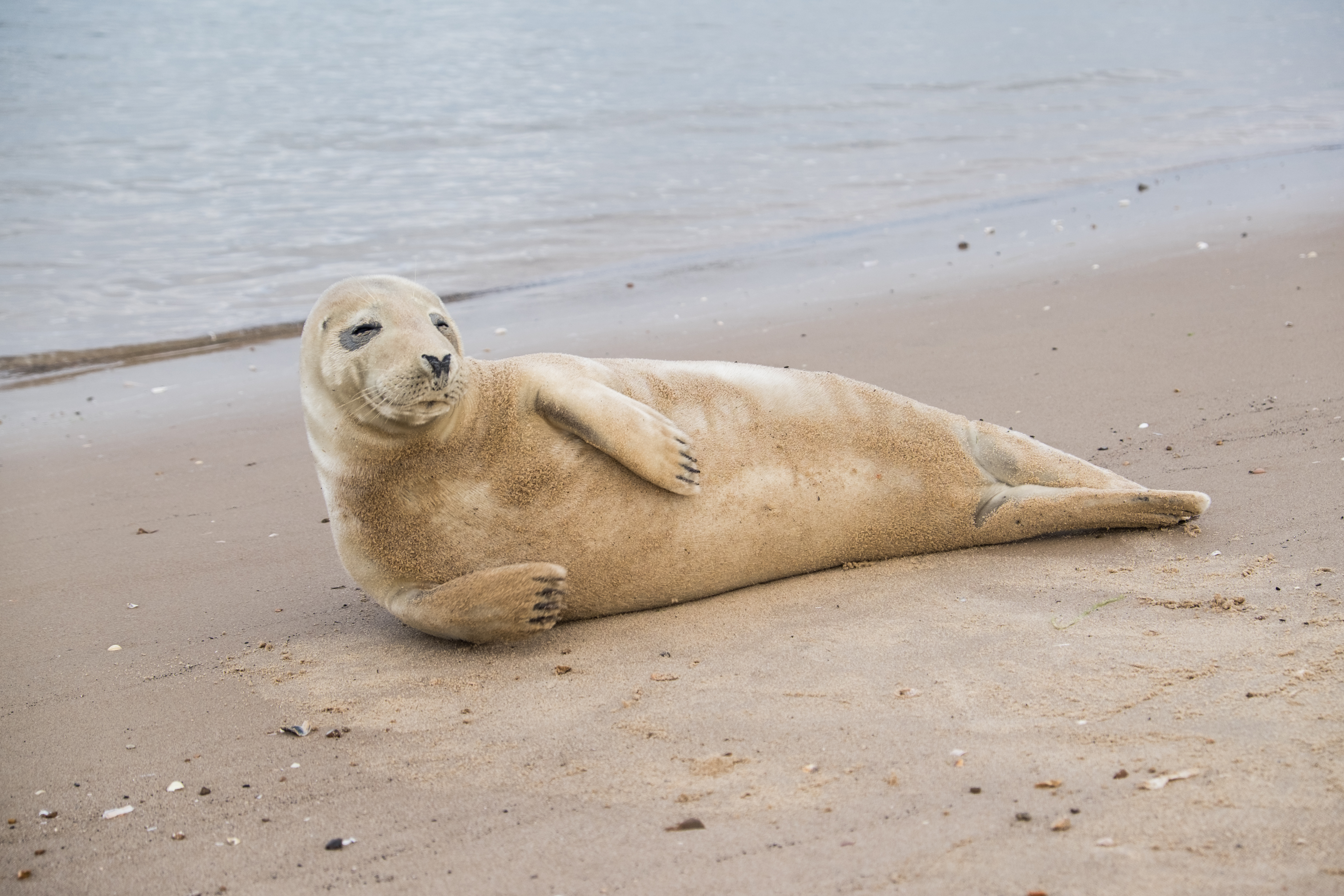
Grey seal on the beach
