= East Herts Miniature Railway =

Miniature railway in Great Amwell, Hertfordshire, England

Coordinates: 51.7935°N 0.0218°W

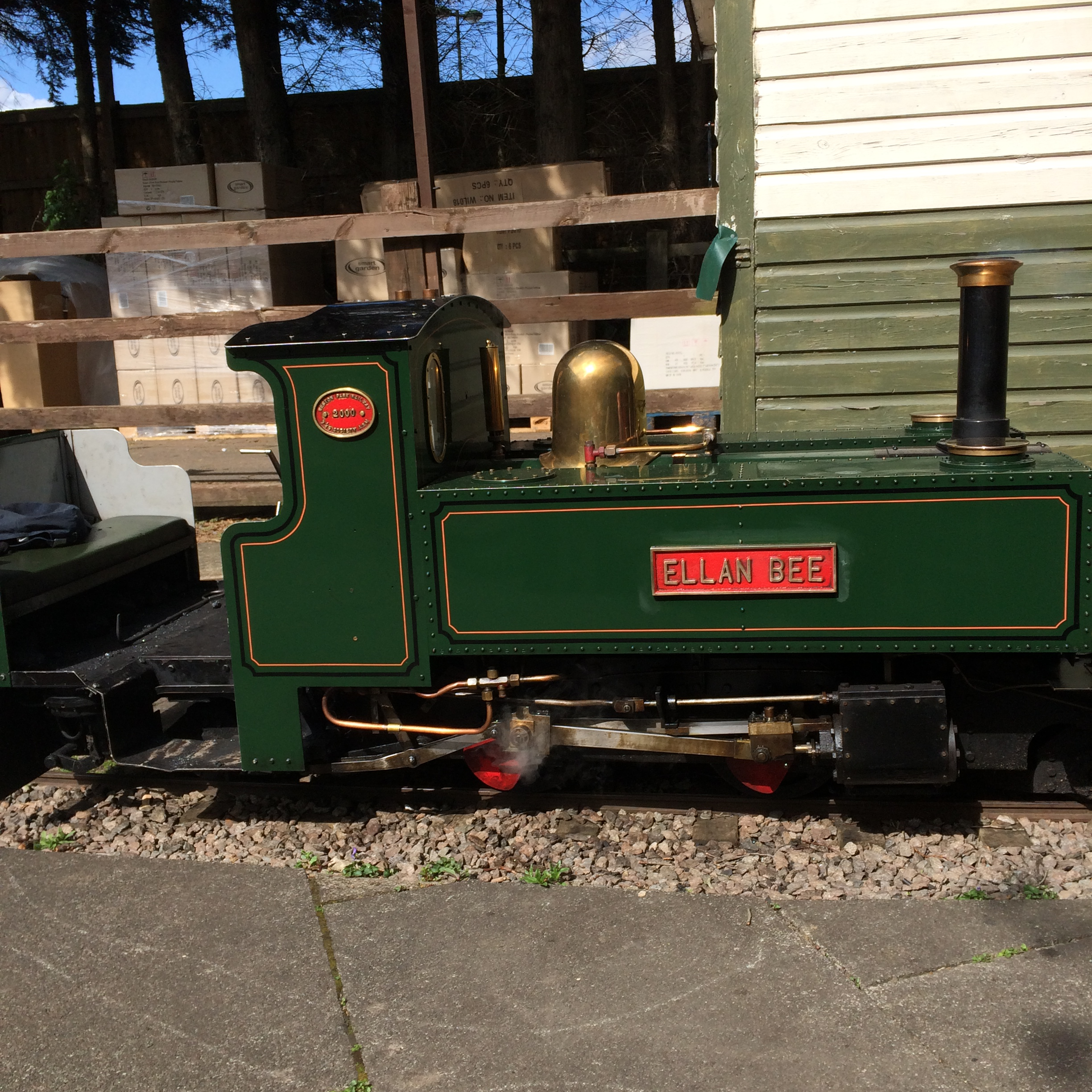
Locomotive Ellan Bee by the turntable.

The East Herts Miniature Railway (EHMR) is situated in the Van Hage Garden Centre, Great Amwell near Ware, Hertfordshire, England. It opened in 1978 and by 2006 had carried 1 million passengers. As of 2022, the railway has carried more than 2 million people over its forty-year history. The railway is popular with locals.

The current length of the track is around 1/4 of a mile. The site comprises a station with canopy and booking office, bridge, engine shed, tunnel, turntable, signal box (with ex London Underground Westinghouse 'B' style lever frame from Hyde Park Corner), steaming bays, level crossing, water tower and workshop.
