= Echills Wood Railway =

Miniature hobbyist railway in Kingsbury Water Park, Warwickshire, England

Coordinates: 52.56217°N 1.69928°W

Overview
- Headquarters: Kingsbury Water Park
- Locale: England
- Dates of operation: 2006–date
- Predecessor: Echills Wood Railway, Stoneleigh Royal Agricultural Showground
- Successor: Operational

Technical
- Track gauge: 7 1/4 in (184 mm)
- Length: 1 3/4 miles

The Echills Wood Railway is a 7 1/4 in (184 mm) miniature hobbyist railway in Kingsbury Water Park, Warwickshire, England.

A feature of the railway is its gnome village, a collection of garden gnomes donated by the public. The gnome village was vandalised in September 2016, when several of the ornaments were damaged. The incident prompted members of the public to donate replacements following an appeal by railway members. Local newspaper, the Tamworth Herald also backed the appeal. The attraction was destroyed for a second time by vandals in April 2017.
