= Barnards Miniature Railway =

7 1/4 gauge miniature railway in Brentwood, Essex, UK

Barnards Miniature Railway is a ridable miniature railway in Essex.

The line opened on 5 September 2010 with an initial length of 260 metres. It uses 7.25-inch (184-millimetre) track. By 2020, the line was approximately 1 mile (1.6 kilometres) long having been extended three times.
