= Watford Miniature Railway =

Attraction in Cassiobury Park, Watford, England

Coordinates: 51°39′45″N 0°25′25″W

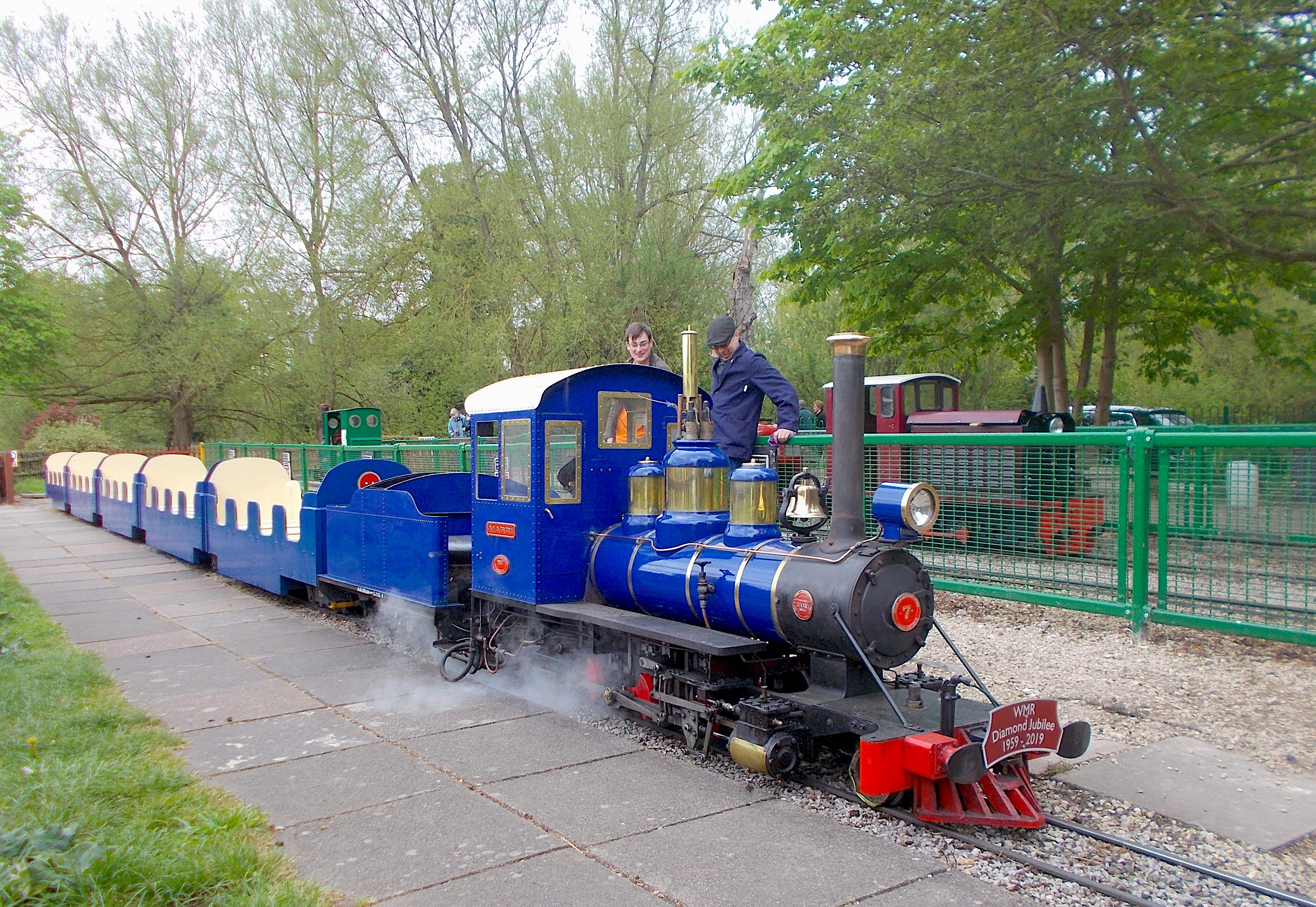
- Willis Light Engineering Baldwin style 2-6-0 No. 7 'Marri' at the station

Overview
- Locale: Cassiobury Park, Watford, England
- Dates of operation: 1959–present

Technical
- Track gauge: 10 1/4 in (260 mm)
- Length: 600 yards (550 m)

Other
- Website: https://www.watfordrailway.co.uk/

The Watford Miniature Railway is a 10 1/4 in (260 mm) gauge railway in Cassiobury Park, Watford, Hertfordshire, England.

== History ==
The railway was opened at Easter 1959 by Charles Reed as a circuit adjacent to the River Gade. Initially there were two locomotives: an LMS Compound steam locomotive named Maid Marion and a petrol-powered 08 Shunter locomotive. In 1968 the steam locomotive left and the railway was sold to George Webb.

In 1979 the railway was sold to Jeff Price, who set about expanding and improving it. In the 1980s the station was rebuilt on a new site, accessed by a gated level crossing over one of the paths in the park. More coaches were added and a number of steam locomotives used.

On Price's retirement in 2017, the railway was sold to new operators Southern Miniature Railways.

== Layout ==
The main station is adjacent to the paddling pools and main children's playground. From here the line turns 120 degrees, crosses a level crossing, and rounds on itself in a wooded area adjacent to the River Gade.

Trains run regularly at weekends and school holidays throughout the year.

== Locomotives ==
=== Current locomotives ===
| Number | Name | Locomotive type | Wheel arrangement | Builder | Built | Photo | Notes |
|---|---|---|---|---|---|---|---|
| 10 | Conway Castle | Diesel Hydraulic | 4w-4w | Fenlow Engineering | 1972 | | |
| | Nikki Louise | Diesel Hydraulic | 0-6-0 | R Prime | 1988 | | Built for the Suffolk Wildlife Park, arrived at Watford in the early 1990s and extensively rebuilt for use there. |
| 7 | Marri | Steam | 2-6-0 | Willis Engineering | 1993 | | Returned to service in April 2018 for the first time since 2003. |
| 4179 | Chiltern Shuttle | Steam | 0-6-0 | R. Morse | 1946 | | Returned to service on 1st January 2022 after an extensive restoration to 'as new' condition |
| D7000 | | Diesel Hydraulic | 4-6w | Southern Miniature Railways | 1965 | | |
| 1950 | Henry | Steam | 4-6-2 | E. Dove | 1950 | | Under restoration |
| | Densil | Diesel Hydraulic | 0-6-0 | Alan Keef | 1998 | | Steam Outline; Built for the Wells Harbour Railway arrived in Watford in 2021. |
| 2015 | Evelyn | Steam | 2-6-4T | B. Elliott & R. Cockwood | 2015 | | |
| 6 | Bluebell | Steam | 2-4-0 | J.Huddell & J.Ley | 2006 | | |

=== Former locomotives ===
| Number | Name | Locomotive type | Wheel arrangement | Builder | Built | Photo | Dates at Watford |
|---|---|---|---|---|---|---|---|
| 1102 | Maid Marion | Steam | 4-4-0 | Unknown | 1920s | | 1959 - 1968 |
| 060 | | Petrol Mechanical | 0-6-0 | C. Reed | 1957 | | 1959 - 1983 |
| | | Steam | 0-6-0 | R. Day | | | 1976 |
| | Meteor V | Petrol Mechanical | 2-4-2 | Shepperton Metal Products | 1970 | | 1981 - 1996 |
| | Meteor II | Diesel Mechanical | 2-4-2 | Shepperton Metal Products | 1969 | | 1983 - 2003 |
| 4442 | | Steam | 4-4-2 | A. Glaze | 1961 | | 1983 - 2003 |
| | Derek | Diesel Mechanical | 4w | Shepperton Metal Products | 1968 | | 1985 - 1991 |
| | Trevithick | Steam | 0-6-2T | R. Marsh | 1975 | | 1987 - 1997 |
| | Invicta | Petrol | 4w | Maxitrak | 1989 | | 1996 - 2002 |
| | Nelly | Steam | 2-4-0ST | Richards Engineering | 1977 | | 2005 - 2014 |
| | Thomas Poole | Petrol Hydrostatic | 0-6-0 | Roanoke | 2006 | | 2011 - 2018 |
| | Pilgrim | Steam | 0-6-0T | D. King | 1981 | | 2019 - 2021 |
