= Swanley New Barn Railway =

Miniature railway in Kent, England

Coordinates: 51.40520°N 0.17674°E

Swanley New Barn Railway Logo

The Swanley New Barn Railway is a 7 1/4 in (184 mm) gauge railway located in Swanley Park, Swanley, Kent, United Kingdom. It is signalled throughout with the signals being controlled from New Barn Station which also serves as a terminus.

== The stations ==
=== New Barn ===
This station is the largest on the line. It has three platforms, a turntable, a ticket office and a signal box. All trains stop at this station, so they can be turned around and be prepared to travel back along the line. This process will often be performed by the juniors giving the drivers a quick break. Passengers are required to go through the ticket office and obtain tickets before they board the train (in the case of those starting their journey at New Barn) or get their tickets as they disembark (if they have travelled from Swanley Parkway). The platforms have been upgraded to the same standard as Swanley Parkway. Though this station has capacity for three trains at one time, this rarely happens except on gala days. There are three platforms and a locomotive loop line where the engines can run around and couple back up to the train. The turntable is manually operated, and a signal directs the operator to a certain line. The station was previously called Lakeside.

=== Swanley Parkway ===
This station is a single platform station located near the car park. Passengers board the train here and then proceed to New Barn station to disembark. The journey from this station to New Barn should take around three minutes. This station was made higher when the platform was redeveloped in 2006, making it easier for passengers to board and leave the train. There are some early plans for increasing the capacity of the station by adding a passing loop to create a second line to the station. It is unsure whether a separate platform to serve the second line will be built or the current platform will be converted to an Island Platform. This station was previously called New Barn Halt.

== The signal box ==
The signal box is located at New Barn Station, which is the larger of the two stations on the line. During the first year of the railway, a signal box was created to help control the points and signals around the station area. The signalman can see where the trains are by using the track circuits which are installed throughout the line. The track layout has been changed several times, all of the major changes are recorded to the left of the track diagram. The signal box was formally named Holborn Crossing in 2013 in memory of the society founding member Christopher Johnson, who during his BR career had been an area manager covering Holborn Viaduct, with the absence of a viaduct the last part was changed to 'crossing'.

The signal box utilises two automatic modes of operation, which means that if there is a lack of staff, the railway line remains operational. The signal box frame has 35 levers, all of which are fully interlocked. The interlocking works with the track circuits and point detection. Which levers are locked is decided by the signal box computer which receives points positions, track circuit data and lever information to decide if it is possible to set a route that will not cause a train to be sent in the wrong direction or be sent on a route where another train is set to cross the track in front of it. The points are worked by 12 V windscreen wiper motors which have been adjusted so that they stop in one of two positions. They are controlled by the signal box computer which is in turn controlled by the levers. The direction that the points are set to is detected by two microswitches located under the points.

The majority of signals are powered by a 12-volt AC supply. The main signal that everyone sees is the one that passengers pass on their way into the station. It has three 20 W bulbs which allow the signal to be seen clearly no matter what the conditions are. The signal located at the platform on Swanley Parkway is powered by a 110 V transformer located inside the signal box.

== Vandalism and events ==
The railway commonly has to deal with problems with vandalism, including smashed windows. There has been damage to the electrical wiring for the signals and track circuits. On one occasion, graffiti was done on a station platform overnight. The track is occasionally lifted up overnight, making it unsuitable and unsafe for the trains to run on it. A burnt-out car was once found blocking the tracks.

Galas
Periodically, the railway holds special events:

- Charity Day: This is held on 1 January each year and is operated using steam engines only.
- 1812 night: An annual Swanley Park event including fireworks and a band. The railway operates a special service up to the launch of the 1st firework.
- Summer gala: Started for the 30th birthday event, these have continued every summer since, with miniature traction engines, stalls and visiting engines on the main line".
