= Wighton (surname) =

Wighton is a surname. Notable people with this surname include:

- Craig Wighton (born 1997), Scottish footballer
- Jack Wighton (born 1993), Australian rugby league footballer
- Jack Wighton (footballer) (1885–1924), Australian rules footballer
- Katie Wighton (born late 20th century?), Australian singer/songwriter and guitarist
- Lorna Wighton (born 1958), Canadian ice dancer
- Rosemary Wighton (1925–1994) Australian literary editor and author
- Shane Wighton (born 1991), American engineer

== See also ==
- Wighton, a village in Norfolk, England
  - Wighton Halt railway station, in Norfolk
- Wight (disambiguation)
