= Warham, Norfolk =

Village in Norfolk, England

Coordinates: 52.93744°N 0.89283°E

Warham
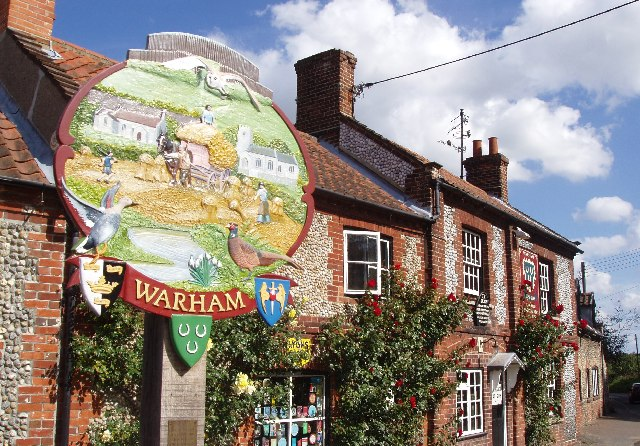
- Warham village sign

- Location within Norfolk
- Area: 18.65 km^{2} (7.20 sq mi)
- Population: 193 (2011)
  - Density: 10/km^{2} (26/sq mi)
- OS grid reference: TF 945 417
- Civil parish: Warham
- District: North Norfolk
- Shire county: Norfolk
- Region: East
- Country: England
- Sovereign state: United Kingdom
- Post town: WELLS-NEXT-THE-SEA
- Postcode district: NR23
- Dialling code: 01328
- Police: Norfolk
- Fire: Norfolk
- Ambulance: East of England
- UK Parliament: North Norfolk

Warham is a village and civil parish in the English county of Norfolk. It is situated about 5 km (3.1 mi) inland from the north Norfolk coast, 5 km (3.1 mi) south-east of the town of Wells-next-the-Sea and 50 km (31 mi) north-west of the city of Norwich.

== Etymology ==
The village's name means 'Weir homestead/village'.

== Parish ==
The civil parish has an area of 18.65 km^{2} (7.20 sq mi) and in the 2001 census and the 2011 Census had a population of 193 in 79 households. For the purposes of local government, the parish falls within the district of North Norfolk.

== Churches ==
This small village has two large medieval churches, and used to have three. The present Church of England parish church All Saints' with its collapsed west tower, is in the village centre near the pub; St Mary Magdalene is about 500 m (550 yd) to the west. All Saints' is Grade II* listed; St Mary's Grade I. Originally there were three ecclesiastical parishes here, but the parishes were merged after the English Reformation. In the process, the church of St Mary the Virgin was demolished. It used to stand just east of All Saints, on the other side of the lane to Wighton.

== Warham Camp ==
Just south of the village is Warham Camp, a small hill fort earthwork built by the Iceni in the 2nd century BC, known locally as 'the Danish Camp'.

== Transport ==
The village has a tiny request stop - Warham railway station - on the narrow gauge Wells and Walsingham Light Railway.
