= Warham railway station =

Railway station in Norfolk, England

Warham
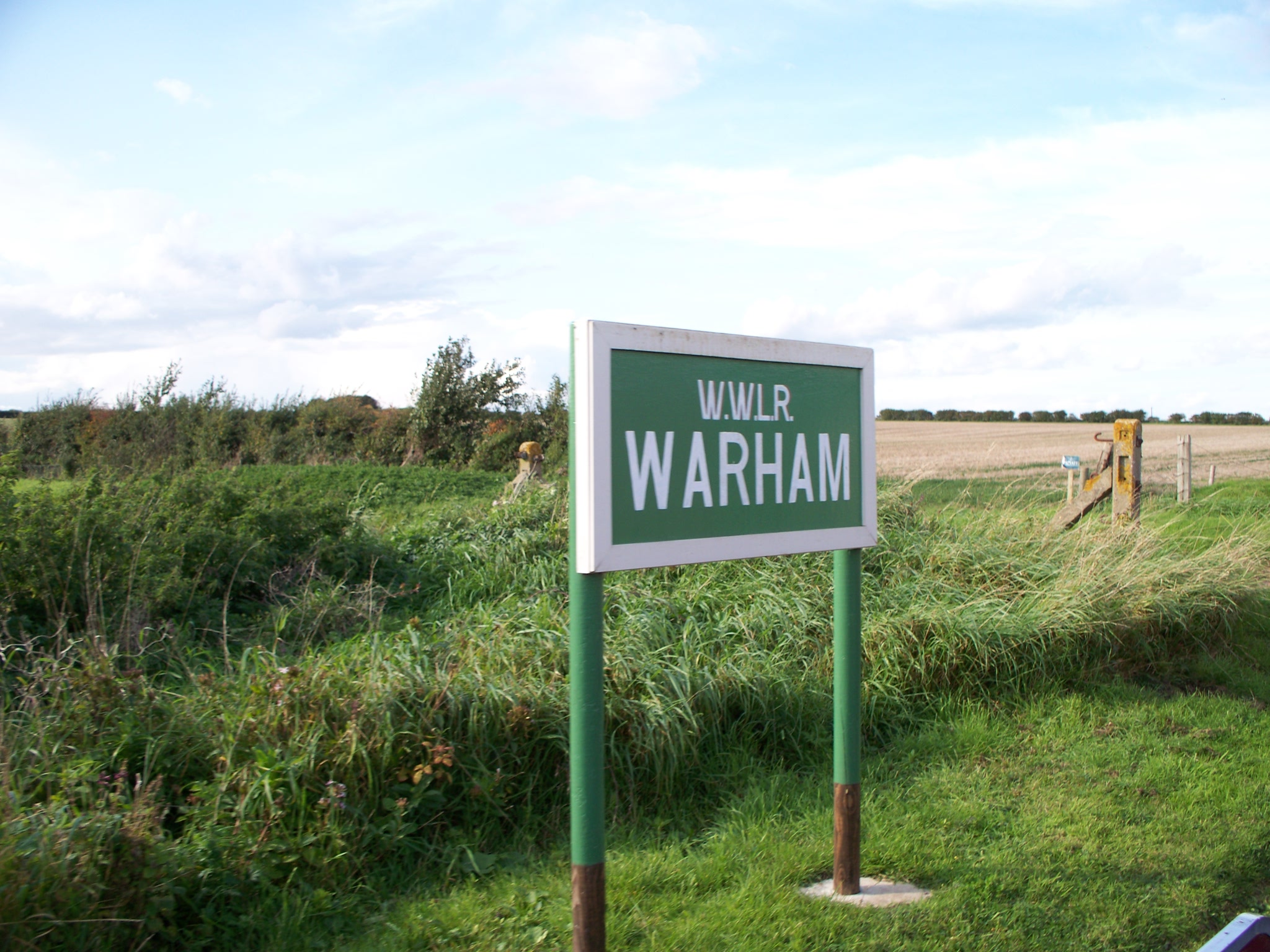
- Warham station signboard

General information
- Location: Warham, North Norfolk, Norfolk; England
- Coordinates: 52.9363°N 0.8777°E
- Grid reference: TF934414
- System: Station on heritage railway
- Owner: Wells and Walsingham Light Railway
- Platforms: 1

Key dates
- 1982: Opened
Location

Warham railway station is a request stop on the narrow gauge Wells and Walsingham Light Railway, and serves the small village of Warham. It opened in 1982.

Preceding station	Heritage railways	Following station
The Midden Halt towards Wells on Sea	Wells & Walsingham Light Railway	Wighton Halt towards Walsingham
