= The Midden Halt railway station =

Railway station in Norfolk, England

The Midden Halt

General information
- Location: Wells-next-the-Sea, North Norfolk, Norfolk; England
- Coordinates: 52.94716°N 0.86820°E
- Grid reference: TF928426
- System: Station on heritage railway
- Owner: Wells and Walsingham Light Railway
Location

The Midden Halt is a request stop on the Wells and Walsingham Light Railway which serves a camp site.

Preceding station	Heritage railways	Following station
Wells on Sea Terminus	Wells & Walsingham Light Railway	Warham towards Walsingham
