= Walsingham railway station =

Former railway station in Norfolk, England

Walsingham
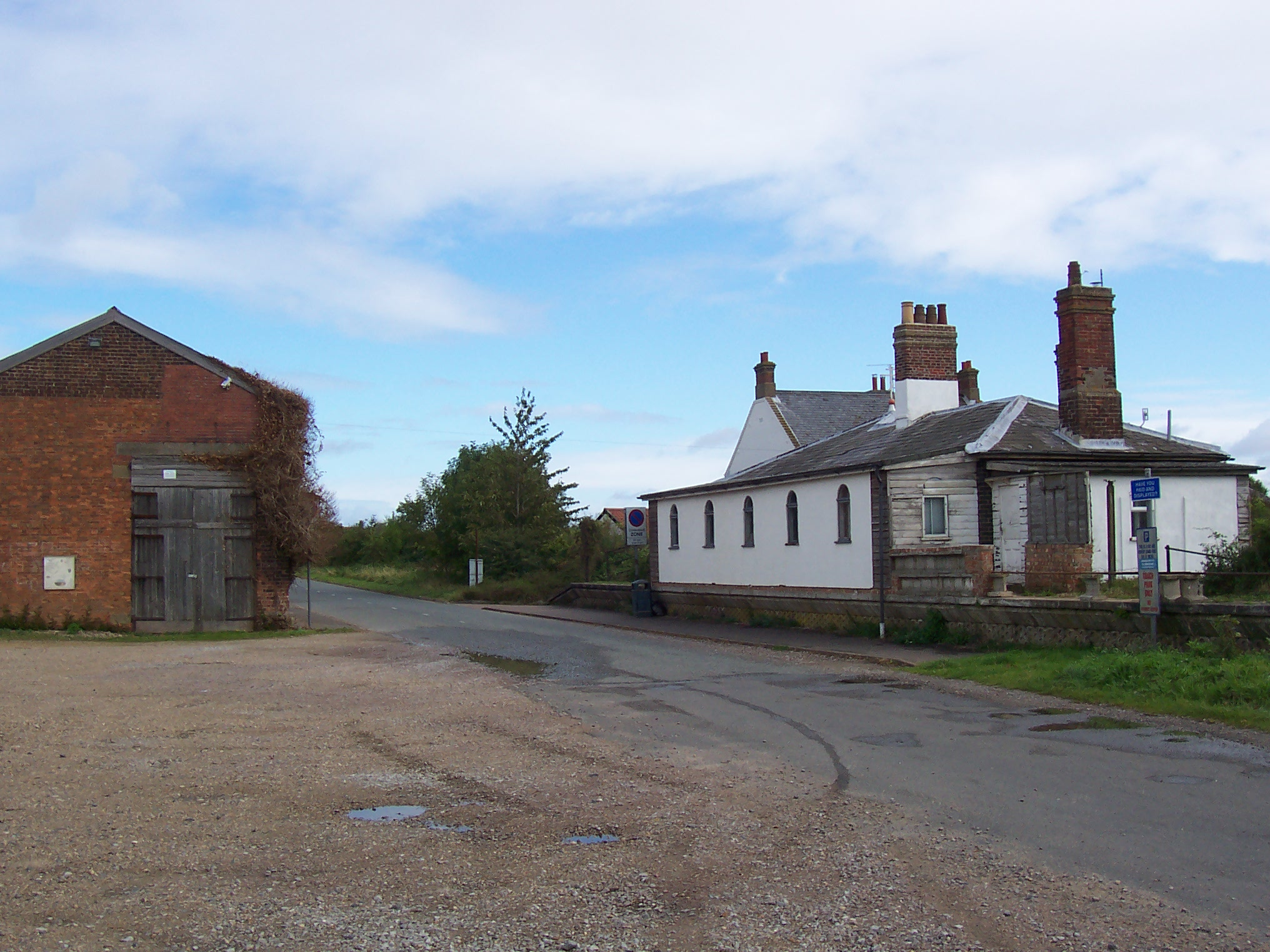
- The former Walsingham station, 2007

General information
- Location: Walsingham, North Norfolk, Norfolk; England
- Coordinates: 52.89357°N 0.87010°E
- Grid reference: TF931368
- Platforms: 1

Other information
- Status: Disused

History
- Original company: Wells and Fakenham Railway
- Pre-grouping: Great Eastern Railway
- Post-grouping: London & North Eastern Railway; Eastern Region of British Railways

Key dates
- 1857: Opened
- 1964: Closed to passengers
- 1967: Buildings reopened as a church
- 1982: New station opened nearby
Location

Walsingham was a railway station on the Wells and Fakenham Railway, later part of the Great Eastern Railway. It opened on 1 December 1857, and served the villages of Great Walsingham and Little Walsingham. It closed on 5 October 1964. The station buildings were purchased in 1967 by a group of members of the Russian Orthodox Church and developed into a small monastic community house, including St. Seraphim's Russian Orthodox church.

The resident religious community has plans to further develop the site, including a permanent dual exhibition which will both showcase the religious life, in particular the art of icon painting, and also provide a historical review of the site's railway heritage.

Since 1982, there has been a second station at Walsingham - the southern terminus of the narrow gauge Wells and Walsingham Light Railway. This station is sited slightly to the north of the original, the latter now having a car and coach park on the site of the tracks.

Preceding station	Disused railways	Following station
Wighton Halt; Line and station closed	Wells and Fakenham Railway	Fakenham East; Line and station closed
Wighton Halt; Line and station closed	British Rail; Eastern Region; Wymondham to Wells via East Dereham	Fakenham East; Line and station closed
