= Wighton Halt railway station =

Railway station in Norfolk, England

Wighton Halt
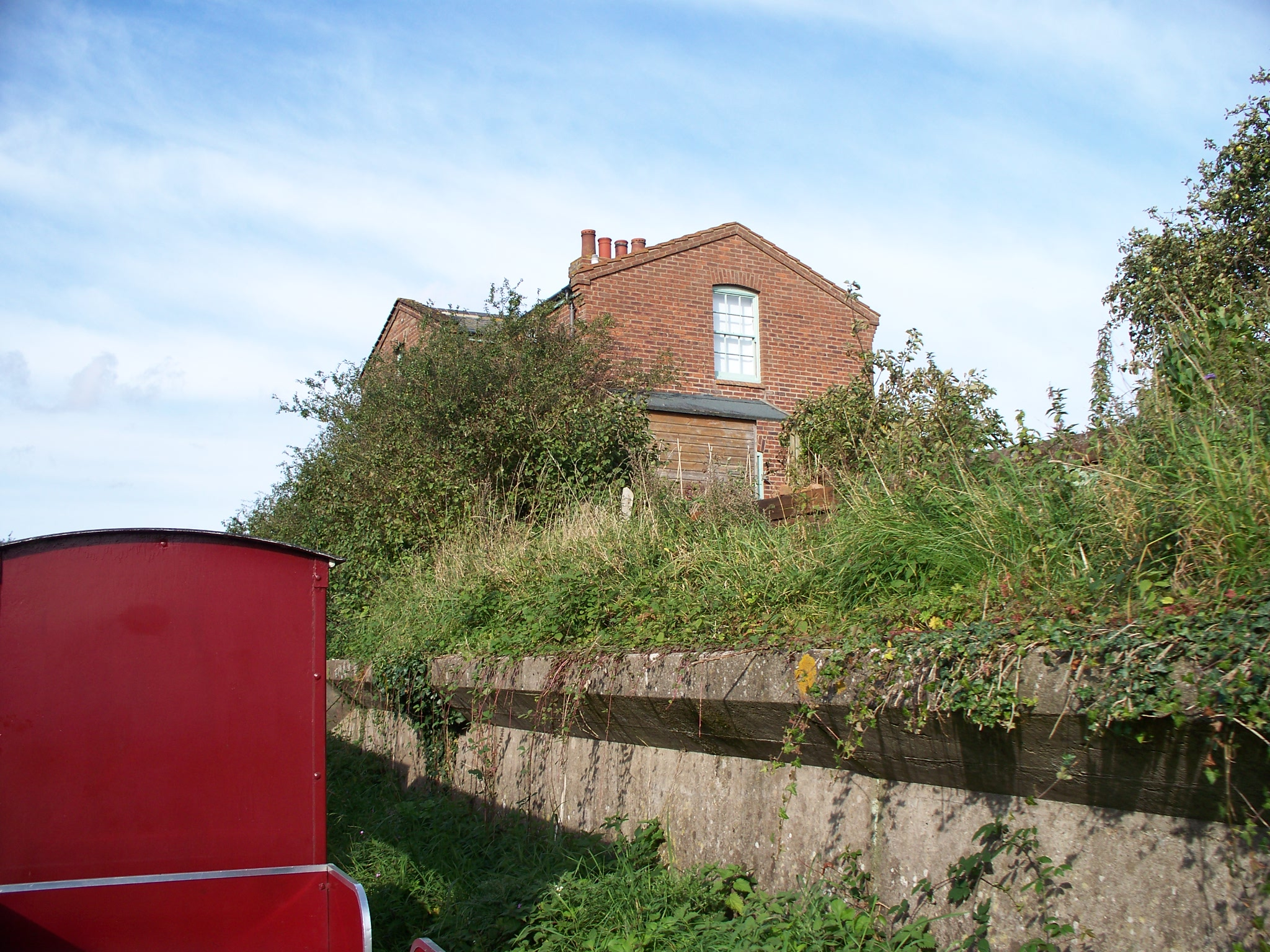
- Wighton Halt with the station building in view.

General information
- Location: Wighton, North Norfolk, Norfolk; England
- Coordinates: 52.91802°N 0.87815°E
- Grid reference: TF936395
- System: Station on heritage railway
- Owner: Wells and Walsingham Light Railway
- Platforms: 1
Location

Wighton Halt is a railway station serving the small village of Wighton, Norfolk. It is a public railway station, originally part of the standard gauge network, and now part of the narrow gauge Wells and Walsingham Light Railway.

== LNER ==
Wighton Halt was a railway station on the Wells and Fakenham Railway, later part of the Great Eastern Railway. It was opened on 1 February 1924 by the London and North Eastern Railway and operated by them until rail nationalisation. It closed on 5 October 1964 as part of the Beeching cuts on the British railway network.

== W&WLR ==
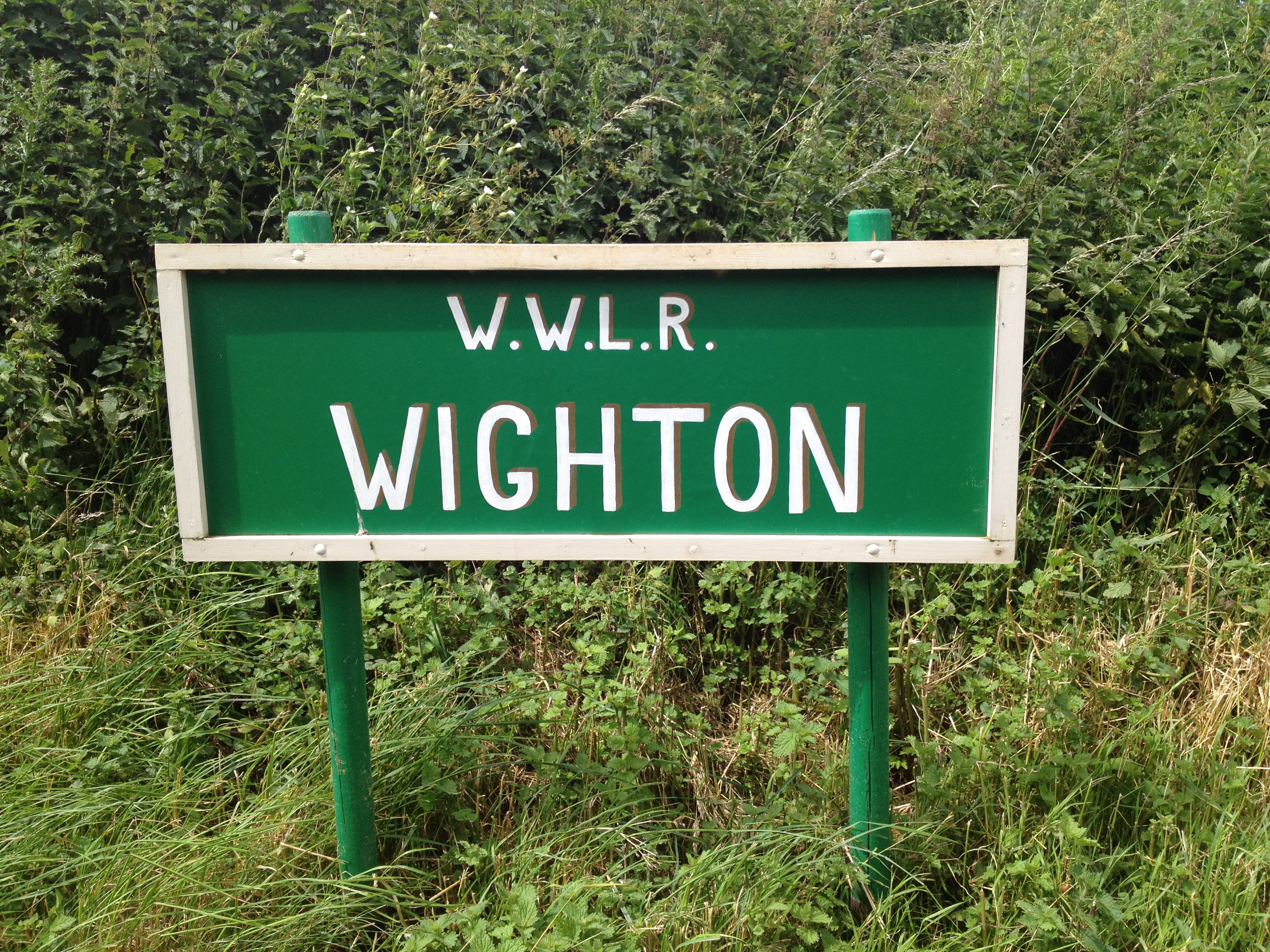
Station name board.

In 1979 construction work began to reopen four miles of the disused railway line between Wells and Walsingham. The narrow gauge Wells & Walsingham Light Railway began operations in April 1982, at which time Wighton railway station reopened, but with the new name of "Seton's Halt". A new station, on the northern side of the village, took the name Wighton Halt. By 2005 it was evident that Wighton village did not require two stations, so the new Wighton Halt was closed, and Seton's Halt reverted to its original name of Wighton. Although it is a request stop, the "halt" suffix does not appear on the station name boards or on timetables.

Preceding station	Heritage railways	Following station
Warham towards Wells on Sea	Wells & Walsingham Light Railway	Walsingham Terminus
Disused railways
Wells-next-the-Sea; Line and station closed	British Rail; Eastern Region; Wymondham to Wells via East Dereham	Walsingham; Line and station closed
