= Hastings Miniature Railway =

Rideable miniature railway in the UK

Coordinates: 50.85513°N 0.5886°E

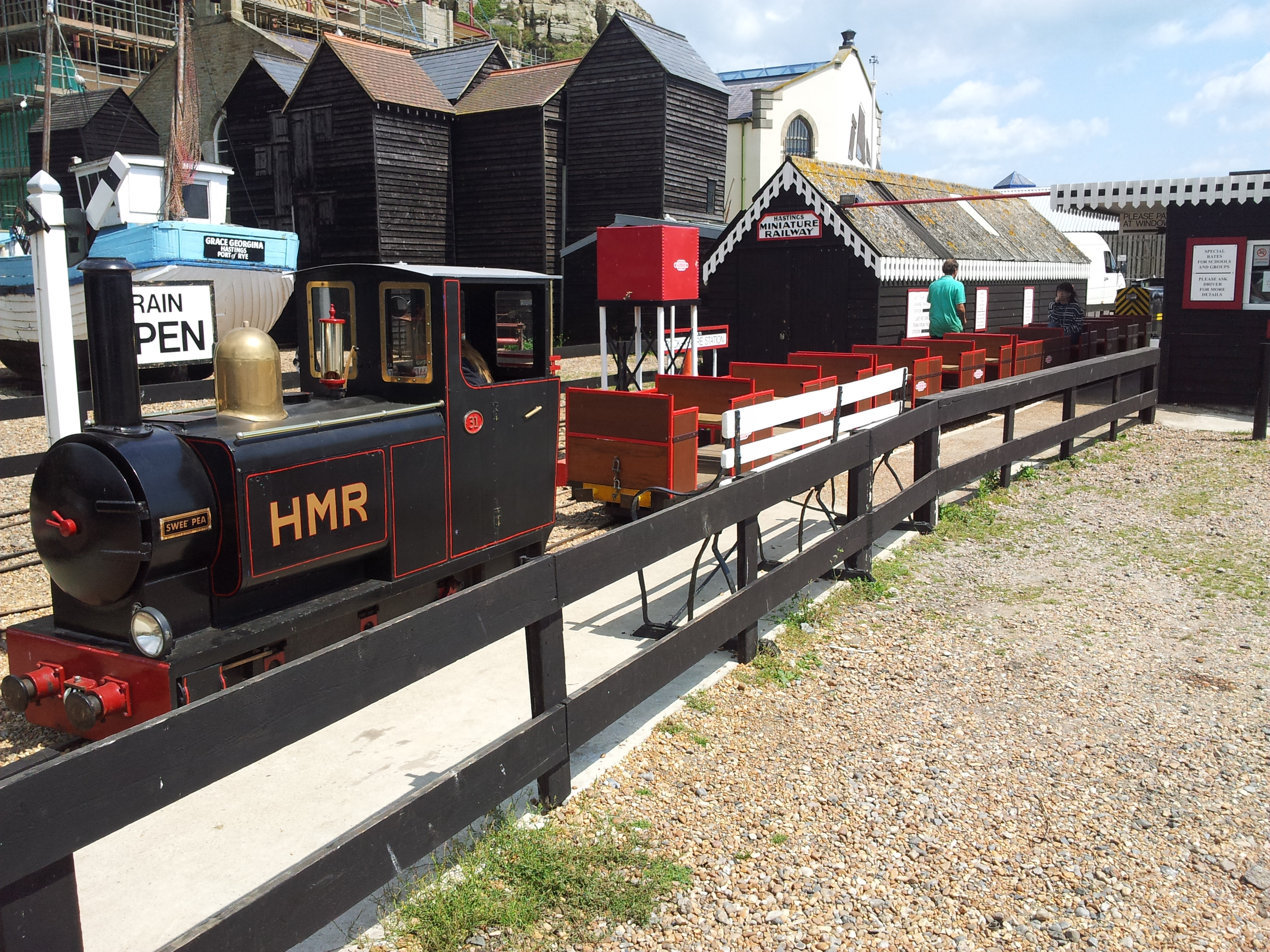
- The eastern terminus, Rock-a-Nore, with a train in the station in 2011.
- Locale: Hastings, East Sussex, England

Preserved operations
- Preserved gauge: 10 1/4 in (260 mm)

Commercial history
- Opened: 1948

Website
- www.hastingsminiaturerailway.co.uk

The Hastings Miniature Railway is a 10 1/4 in (260 mm) gauge miniature railway located on the seafront at Hastings, a seaside resort, town, and ancient cinque port, in East Sussex, England. Opened in 1948, it remains a popular tourist attraction. The line was re-opened in the summer of 2011 after a period of reconstruction and restoration, which coincided with a forced closure of the eastern part of the line, to facilitate building work on a new art gallery adjacent to the railway.

== Early history ==
The railway entrepreneur Captain J.E.P. Howey, who built and owned the Romney, Hythe and Dymchurch Railway, had a great interest in miniature railway locomotives generally and acquired several locomotives of assorted gauges. One was a 10 1/4 in (260 mm) gauge model Great Western Railway pannier tank which Howey had rebuilt as an 0-6-0 tender locomotive named 'Firefly'. He also acquired a scale model Royal Scot engine of the same gauge. Although these engines were of too narrow a gauge for his railway, they did briefly operate after the second world war on a short length of track re-gauged for the purpose, near New Romney. They also operated (particularly Firefly) near Dymchurch, on a section of 10 1/4 in (260 mm) gauge track established alongside the main 15 in (381 mm) gauge running lines just before the outbreak of war, and continuing there until 1947. They were then relocated to St Leonards-on-Sea where Howey operated a small miniature railway for less than a year. Local complaints led to the line being relocated to Hastings and sold to Ian Allan and Jim Hughes, which was the beginning of the Hastings Miniature Railway, opening in 1948.

== Operation from 1948 to 1984 ==
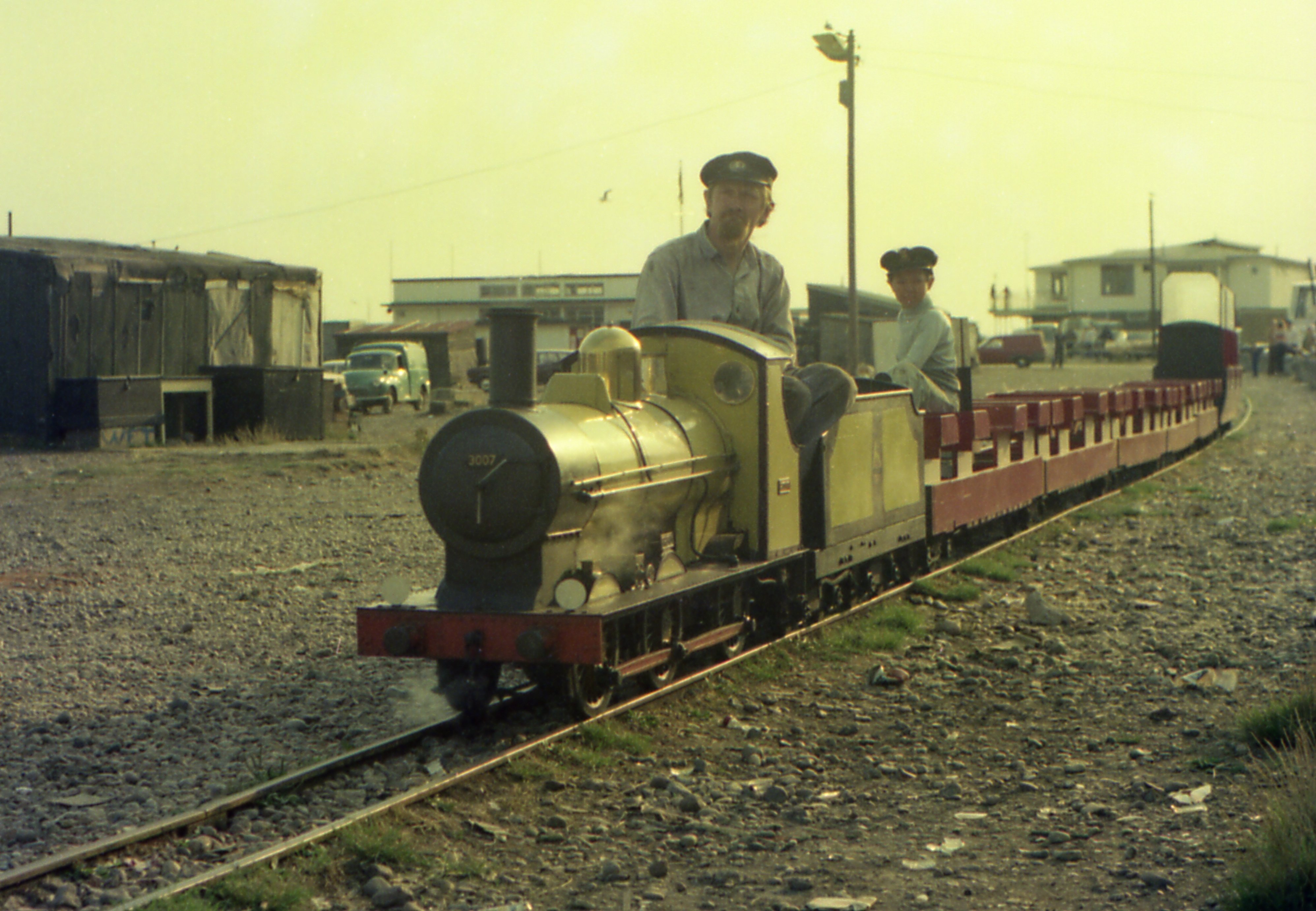
Train with Firefly, in 1976

The railway's headquarters and engine sheds were constructed in 1948 at Rock-a-Nore, an urban area of old Hastings, dominated by the fishing industry, and the line ran from here along the beach (known locally as 'The Stade') to a railway station near the lifeboat station.

In 1959 the line was extended to a new terminus at Marine Parade, provided with a single-platform station and run-round loop, and taking the full extent of the line to a little over 600 yards.

== Former locomotives ==
- Firefly, built H.C.S. Bullock, in 1936 (as GWR 0-6-0PT No 3007); rebuilt 1945 by RHDR engineers as 0-6-0 tender locomotive. This engine is perhaps the one most closely associated with the Hastings Miniature Railway, having operated there from the opening of the line in 1948 until 1984, when it was sold to the Kerr's Miniature Railway in Scotland. Having been the principal engine at Hastings, it has retained that role (and the original number, 3007) in Scotland, where it still runs today.
- Royal Scot, built Bassett-Lowke in 1938, a 4-6-0 tender locomotive No 6100, being a scale model of LMS Royal Scot Class 6100 Royal Scot. Purchased in 1947 from the Marquess of Downshire by Captain J.E.P. Howey. This locomotive was steamed by the eccentric Howey in his living room, causing enormous damage to the property. The engine operated at Hastings for many years from the line's opening in 1948, until spring 1975 when it was sold, and appears in many historic photographs.
- Hampton Court, built Twinings Models, in 1939 (as a simple 4-4-2 design), supplied to Dudley Zoo Railway as a third engine there. After running on railways at Cleethorpes, Lowestoft, and Hunstanton, the engine came to Hastings in 1958 and was rebuilt by Jim Hughes as a GWR Saint Class 4-6-0 tender engine No 2943, Hampton Court. The engine was sold in 1974 and moved to the Stapleford Miniature Railway, where it continues to operate.

== Operation since 1984 ==
In 2008 the railway's old passenger carriages (still in regular use) were repainted in a standard livery (they had previously been painted assorted colours since the late 1980s) and a new railway logo was applied. Eleven passenger carriages were then available - seven in the main articulated set, and four spare vehicles. The locomotive Swee' Pea was rebuilt to a less angular design.
