= Wighton =

Village in Norfolk, England

Coordinates: 52.92146°N 0.88433°E

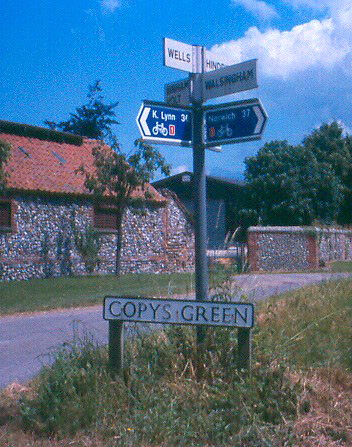
- Road intersection in Copy's Green, a hamlet in the parish, with signs for National Cycle Route 1

- Location within Norfolk
- Area: 11.93 km^{2} (4.61 sq mi)
- Population: 222 (2011)
  - Density: 19/km^{2} (49/sq mi)
- OS grid reference: TF940399
- Civil parish: Wighton
- District: North Norfolk
- Shire county: Norfolk
- Region: East
- Country: England
- Sovereign state: United Kingdom
- Post town: WELLS-NEXT-THE-SEA
- Postcode district: NR23
- Dialling code: 01328
- Police: Norfolk
- Fire: Norfolk
- Ambulance: East of England
- UK Parliament: North Norfolk

Wighton is a village and civil parish in the English county of Norfolk. The village is situated some 3.7 mi (6.0 km) south of the town of Wells-next-the-Sea, 7.5 mi (12.1 km) north of the town of Fakenham, and 28 mi (45 km) north-west of the city of Norwich. The medieval pilgrimage centre of Walsingham lies 3 km (1.9 mi) to the south.

The villages name means 'Farm/settlement with a dwelling'.

The civil parish has an area of 11.93 km^{2} (4.61 sq mi) and in the 2001 census had a population of 203 in 92 households, the population increasing to 222 at the 2011 Census. For the purposes of local government, the parish falls within the district of North Norfolk.

Wighton is on the River Stiffkey and used to have a watermill, but this was demolished in May 1866. The Wells and Walsingham Light Railway runs close to the village, to the west, and there is a halt called Wighton Halt. A regular bus service is provided as the village is on the Coastliner bus route (service number 36) with destinations including Fakenham, Wells, Hunstanton and King's Lynn.

The village was used as the location shooting for "Little Bazeley by the Sea" in the 1965 "The Avengers" episode entitled The Town of No Return with intrepid agents Patrick Macnee (John Steed) and Diana Rigg (Emma Peel.) The local pub featured in the episode was called "The Inebriated Gremlin".
