= Wells and Fakenham Railway =

Railway company in UK

The Wells and Fakenham Railway was the northern part of the Wymondham to Wells branch in Norfolk, England. It connected the market town of Fakenham to the coast at Wells-next-the-Sea. It closed to passenger traffic in 1964 and to goods traffic in 1980.

== Construction ==
Wells and Fakenham Railway Act 1854
- Act of Parliament
- Parliament of the United Kingdom
- Long title: An Act for making a Railway from the Town of Wells to join the Norfolk Railway at Fakenham, to be called "The Wells and Fakenham Railway."
- Citation: 17 & 18 Vict. c. clxxx

Dates
- Royal assent: 24 July 1854

Text of statute as originally enacted

The Norfolk Railway opened a line from Wymondham to Dereham, on the Norwich to Thetford mainline, in 1847, and a line from Dereham to Fakenham in 1849. The Wells and Fakenham Railway, incorporated by the Wells and Fakenham Railway Act 1854 (17 & 18 Vict. c. clxxx), was formed by local landowners and some directors of the Norfolk Railway. The 9.5 miles (15.3 km) Fakenham to Wells line opened in 1857.

It shall be lawful for the Company to make and maintain a Railway, with all proper Works and Conveniences connected therewith, commencing by a Junction with the Norfolk Railway in the Parish of Fakenham in the County of Norfolk, and terminating at or near to the Custom House in the Parish of Wells-next-the-Sea in the same County. — Section 16m, Wells and Fakenham Railway Act 1854 (17 & 18 Vict. c. clxxx)

Wells and Fakenham Railway Act 1859
- Act of Parliament
- Parliament of the United Kingdom
- Long title: An Act to extend the Wells and Fakenham Railway to and along Wells Quays, and for other Purposes.
- Citation: 22 & 23 Vict. c. cxxxix

Dates
- Royal assent: 13 August 1859

Text of statute as originally enacted

The Wells and Fakenham Railway Act 1859 (22 & 23 Vict. c. cxxxix), authorised a short branch to Wells Harbour which was built in 1859. The act also authorised the Norfolk Railway to guarantee dividends upon the additional £3,000 capital the act allowed the Wells and Fakenham Railway to raise. The Norfolk Railway and the Fakenham Railway also made a perpetual agreement for the Norfolk Railway to operate the line, with the actual operation of the line being carried out by the Eastern Counties Railway.

The Company may make and maintain the Railway hereinafter mentioned, together with all proper works and conveniences connected therewith, and approaches thereto (that is to say):

- A Railway from the Wells and Fakenham Railway at the Wells Station to and along the quays at Wells.

— Section 3, Wells and Fakenham Railway Act 1859 (22 & 23 Vict. c. cxxxix)

The line became part of the Great Eastern Railway on 1 September 1862 by the Great Eastern Railway Act 1862 (25 & 26 Vict. c. ccxxiii).

The line used diesel multiple units for passenger traffic from 1955. It was listed for closure in the Beeching Report and closed to passengers on 5 October 1964. Goods services continued until 1980.

== The route today ==
Part of the route has been reopened as the Wells and Walsingham Light Railway. A section of trackbed from Walsingham railway station southwards to the village of Houghton Saint Giles is used as a public footpath called the Pilgrims' Way.
