= Warham Camp =

Iron Age hill fort in Norfolk, UK

Coordinates: 52.9302°N 0.8903°E

- Site of Special Scientific Interest
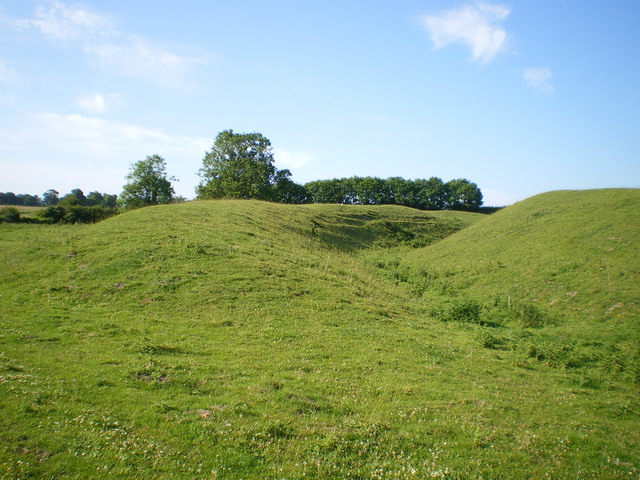
- The ramparts on the north-west side
- Location of Warham Camp.
- Area of search: Norfolk
- Grid reference: TF 943 408
- Interest: Biological
- Area: 5.1 hectares (13 acres)
- Notification date: 1984
- Location map: Magic Map

Warham Camp is an Iron Age circular hillfort with a total diameter of 212 metres (232 yards) near Warham, south of Wells-next-the-Sea in Norfolk, England. It is a scheduled monument dated to between 800BC and 43AD, and a 5.1-hectare (13-acre) biological Site of Special Scientific Interest, located within the Norfolk Coast Area of Outstanding Natural Beauty. The University of East Anglia has described it as the best-preserved hill fort in Norfolk.

First built by the Iceni people centuries before the Roman conquest of Britain, the monument later housed a Roman blacksmith. A section of its bank was partially destroyed in the 18th century rerouting of the River Stiffkey. It has now been the subject of archaeological excavations spanning 90 years.

This unimproved chalk grassland site is heavily grazed by rabbits and cattle. It has diverse herb species such as common rock-rose and squinancywort, and butterflies including the chalkhill blue.

== History ==
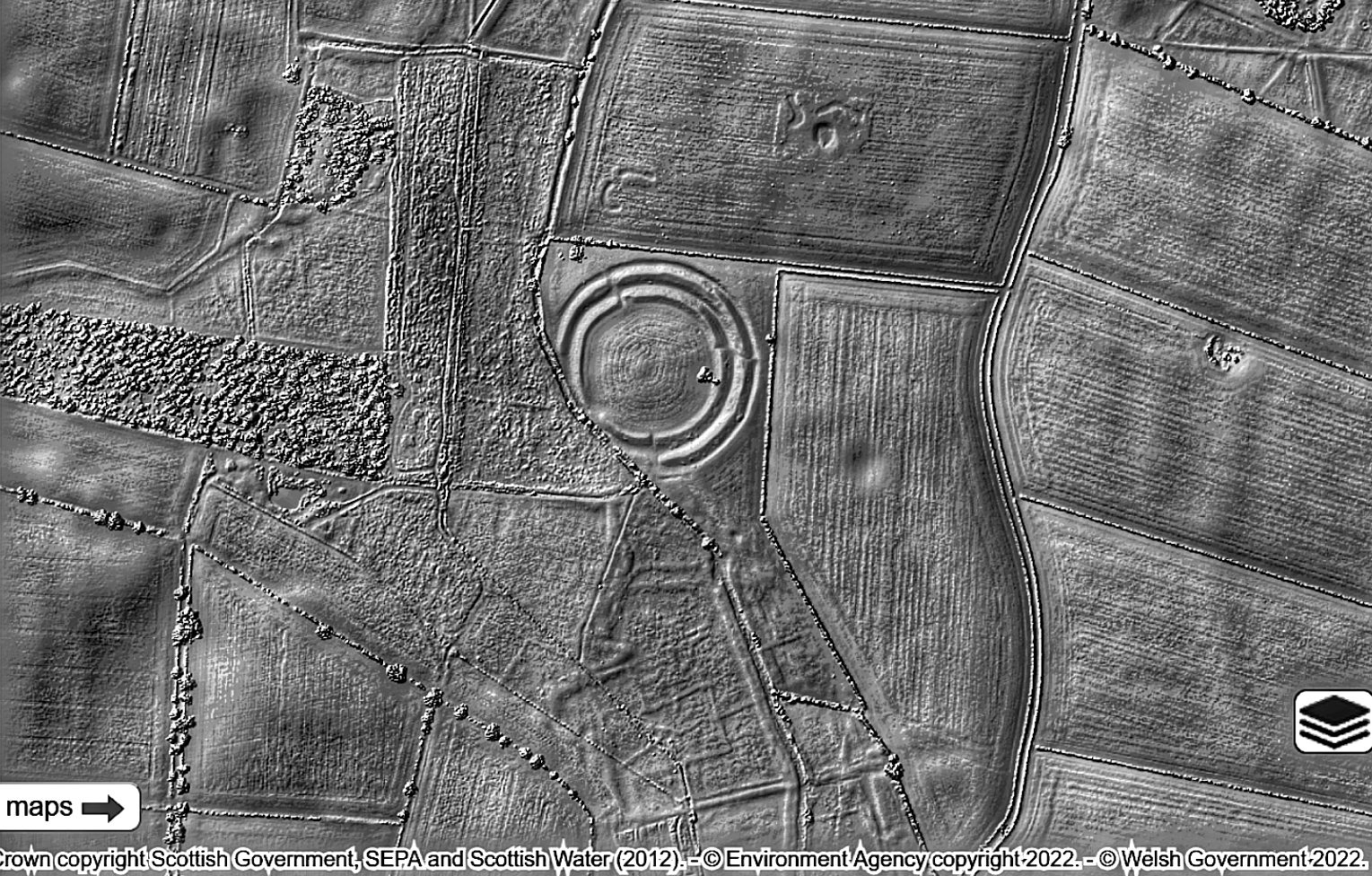
A lidar image derived from Environmental Agency open source data via the houseprices.io lidar map.

A precise chronology for the site has been difficult to make clear. The fort was originally built by the local Iceni people, dating centuries before the 1st century AD Roman conquest of Britain. Centuries after the conquest, and after the establishment of nearby towns such as Venta Icenorum, an out-of-town Roman blacksmith was set up in the monument's interior in the 3rd and 4th centuries AD. Following this, no evidence of medieval activity has been observed, apart from a ridge and furrow pattern which is likely from ploughing in the 19th century.

The fort is now divided into two parts across the earthworks' south-western edge by a channel of the River Stiffkey, which was diverted into its present channel in the eighteenth century, potentially to improve the view from the nearby Warham Grove House. This destroyed a portion of the fort's outer bank.

== Excavations ==
The site was excavated on a small scale in 1914 by Harold St George Gray, and another small-scale excavation was undertaken in 1959 by Rainbird Clarke for the Norfolk Research Committee. The excavations found that the fort's surrounding banks had once been crowned by a tall timber palisade, as well as a wooden platform to the rear, and unearthed pottery sherds which suggested Iron Age and Roman activity, the specifics of which are as yet unknown. The 1959 excavation in particular also searched for dating services from under the fort's inner bank and fill of the outer ditch; a section across the defences revealed details of the ramparts as well as the remains of a timber structure at the top of the inner bank.

As part of the Later Prehistoric Norfolk Project which had also investigated Arminghall Henge, a second excavation led by archaeologists from the Cambridge Archaeological Unit and project director Andrew Hutcheson took place in Summer 2023 as a community dig, involving pupils from the Synergy Multi-Academy Trust and 33 volunteers from the Restoration Trust. This excavation, as well as digging 21 test-pits in the interior of the fort, focused on the area of earthworks that had been levelled in the 18th century; it found a cobbled surface under a section of the destroyed earthworks, as well as Roman objects from the 3rd and 4th centuries AD in the interior, including hobnails from boots and 12 Roman coins and evidence of a forge through large amounts of hammerscale. The excavation was featured in BBC Two's Digging for Britain, presented by Alice Roberts. At the same time, the Norfolk Rivers Trust was working to restore the river's natural meander and found a chalk platform that aligned with the fort.
