= Jack Wighton (footballer) =

Australian rules footballer

Personal information
- Full name: John Gordon Wighton
- Born: 22 July 1885; Prahran, Victoria
- Died: 8 April 1924 (aged 38); The Rip, off Queenscliff, Victoria
- Original team: Mercantile

Playing career^{1}
Years	Club	Games (Goals)
1906	Geelong	2 (0)
- ^{1} Playing statistics correct to the end of 1906.

John Gordon Wighton (22 July 1885 – 8 April 1924) was an Australian rules footballer who played with Geelong in the Victorian Football League (VFL).

Wighton was one of the victims of the sinking of the steamer Wyrallah in April 1924.
