= Ten and a quarter inch gauge =

Modelling scale

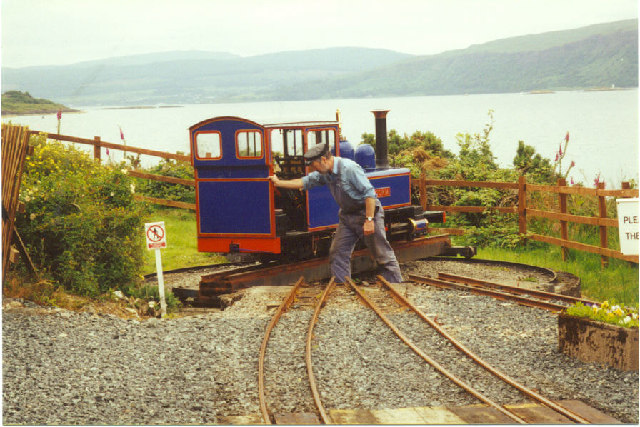
At Craignure station on the Isle of Mull Railway

Ten and a quarter inch gauge (or X scale) (10 1/4 in / 260 mm) is a large modelling scale, generally only used for ridable miniature railways. Model railways at this scale normally confine the scale modelling aspects to the reproduction of the locomotive and with steam locomotives the accompanying tender. Rolling stock is generally made to carry passengers or maintenance equipment and is not to scale. There are also a number of railways which use this gauge of track but are narrow-gauge railways. Examples are Rudyard Lake Steam Railway, Isle of Mull Railway and Wells and Walsingham Light Railway. An organisation to promote this gauge of railway has been reformed in May 2010 as The Ten and a Quarter Railway Society, which will also cover the larger 12 1/4 in (311 mm) and smaller 9 1/2 in (241 mm) gauges.

== Locomotives ==
Generally model trains at this scale are individually hand-made, however between 1963 and 1964, Lines Bros Ltd using their combined Tri-ang and Minic brand names produced a commercial system under the name the Tri-ang Minic Narrowgauge Railway, or T.M.N.R.. Commercial companies also build bespoke locomotives or in the case of the Exmoor Steam Railway a standard design of 2-4-2T.

== Rolling stock ==
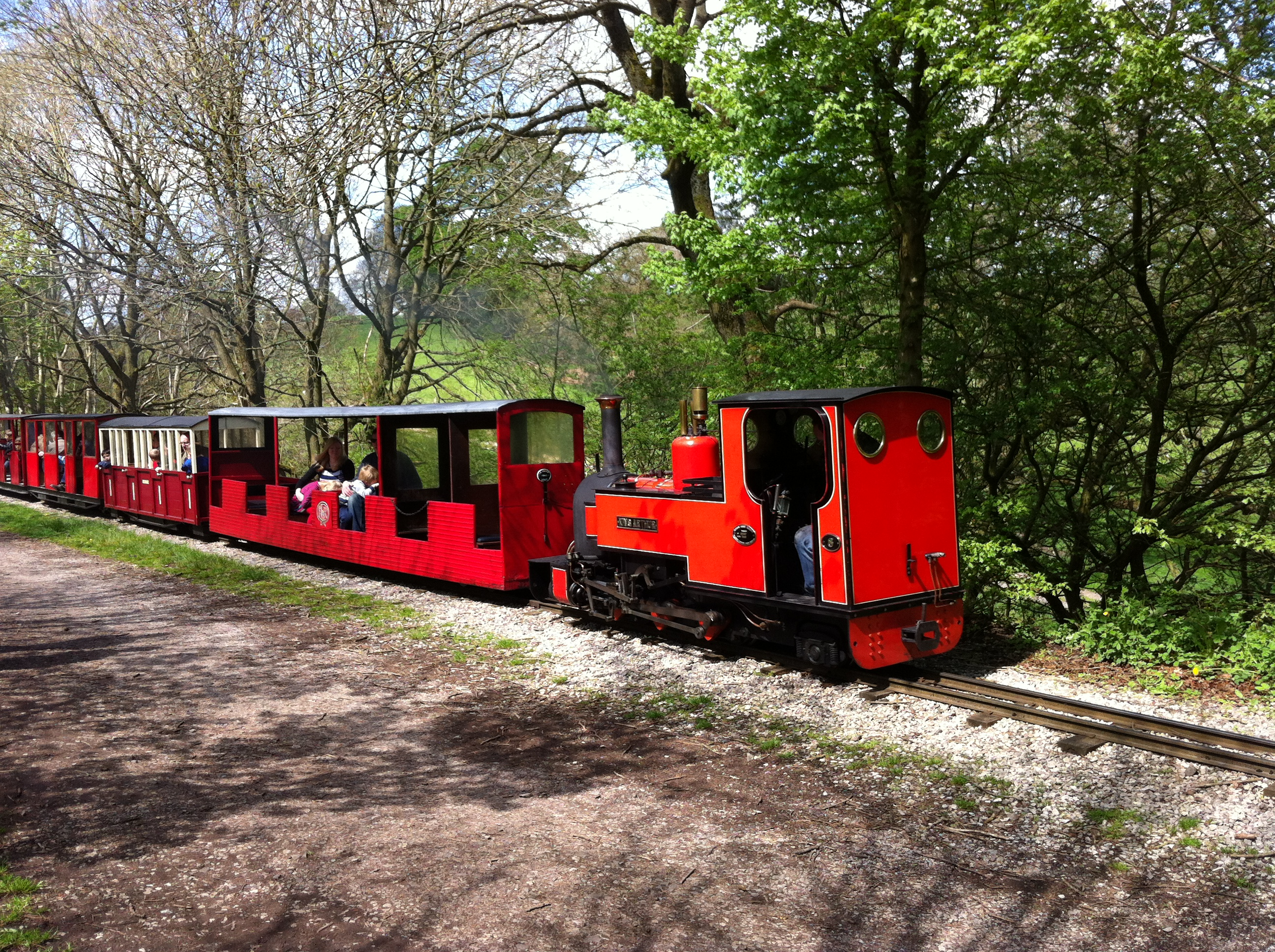
Rudyard Lake Steam Railway

Rolling stock was normally supplied in the form of seaside coaches. However the more growth in narrow-gauge style railways shows that fully enclosed coaches seating two adults side by side are possible and preferable for commercial railways.

== See also ==
- Rail transport modelling scales
