= Wells and Walsingham Light Railway =

Heritage railway in North Norfolk, England

Coordinates: 52.9277°N 0.8774°E

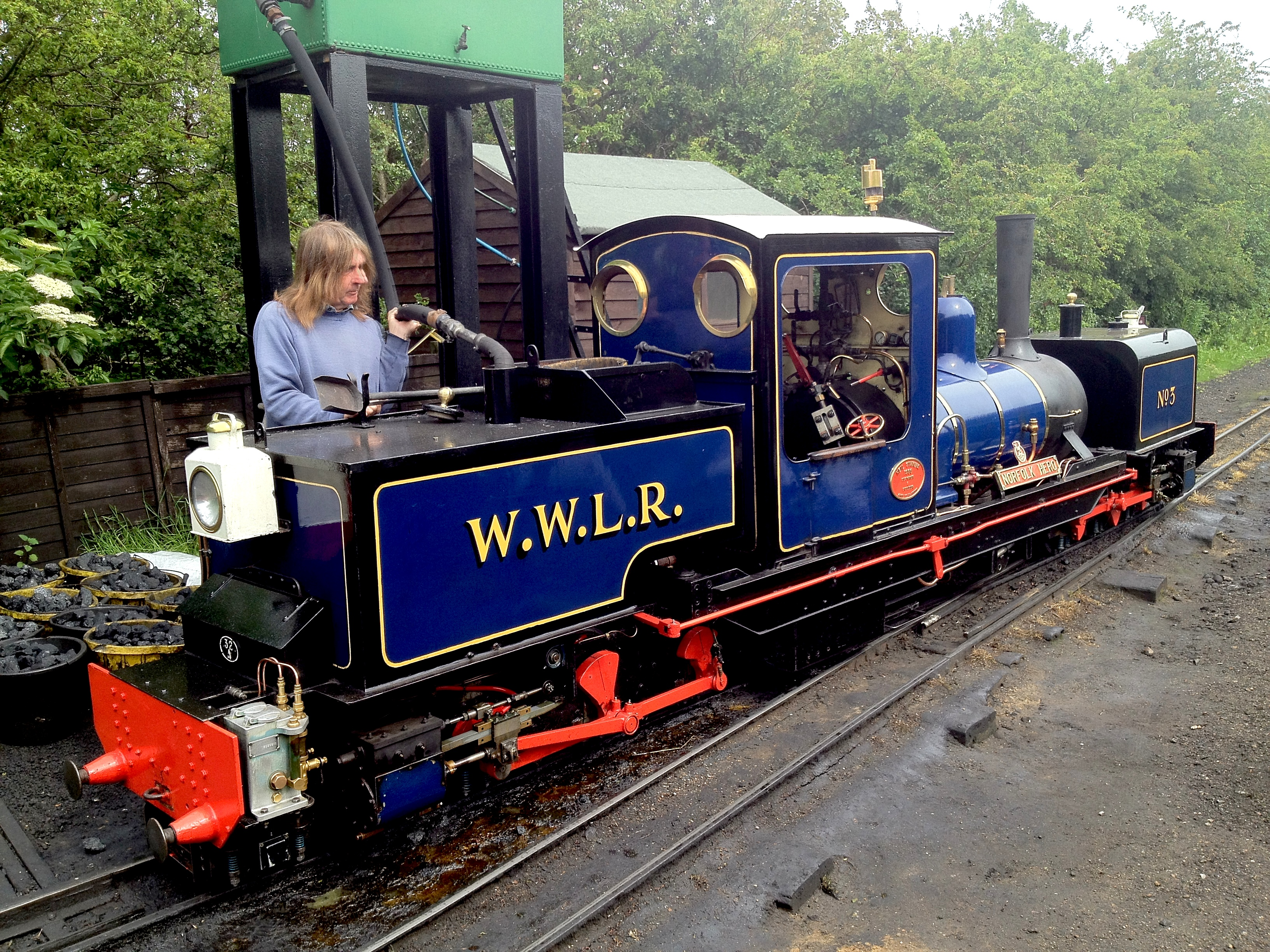
- Norfolk Hero taking on water at Wells station.
- Locale: North Norfolk
- Terminus: Wells-next-the-Sea; Walsingham

Commercial operations
- Name: LNER
- Original gauge: 1,435 mm (4 ft 8 1/2 in) standard gauge

Preserved operations
- Operated by: Wells & Walsingham Light Railway
- Stations: 5
- Length: 4 mi (6.4 km)
- Preserved gauge: 10 1/4 in (260 mm)

Commercial history
- Opened: 1845
- Closed: 1964

Preservation history
- 1979: Rebuilding commenced, converted to 10 1/4 in (260 mm)
- 1982: Light Railway Order granted
- 1982: Reopened to public

Website
- https://www.wwlr.co.uk/

The Wells and Walsingham Light Railway is a 10 1/4 in (260 mm) gauge heritage railway in Norfolk, England running between the coastal town of Wells-next-the-Sea and the inland village of Walsingham. The railway occupies a four-mile (6.4 km) section of the trackbed of the former Wymondham to Wells branch which was closed to passengers in stages from 1964 to 1969 as part of the Beeching cuts. Other parts of this line, further south, have also been preserved by the Mid-Norfolk Railway.

Despite its miniature dimensions, the Wells and Walsingham Light Railway is a "public railway", indicating that its operation is established by act of Parliament. The original establishment of the preserved line was authorised by the Wells and Walsingham Light Railway Order 1982, the terms of which were altered under the subsequent Wells and Walsingham Light Railway (Amendment) Order 1994. Prior to 1982 the 15 in (381 mm) gauge Romney, Hythe and Dymchurch Railway had traded as "The World's smallest public railway", a phrase sometimes quoted by the Wells and Walsingham Light Railway since the 1982 Light Railway Order.

== Overview ==
The line, which is 4 miles (6.44 km) long, is now the longest 10 1/4 in (260 mm) gauge railway in the world. It runs from the coastal town of Wells-next-the-Sea to the village of Walsingham, famous as a centre of pilgrimage to the Shrine of Our Lady of Walsingham. Owing to the difficulty of obtaining authority to operate across main roads via level crossings, the railway operates between a newly built station located on the A149 approximately 1/2 mile (0.80 km) south of the original terminus at Wells, and a similar new terminus at Walsingham situated a short distance north of the original GER station, and within sight of it.

Trains run daily between March and November, with the timetable intensifying during the high season period. Trains are mostly steam-operated, although diesel motive power is also utilised.

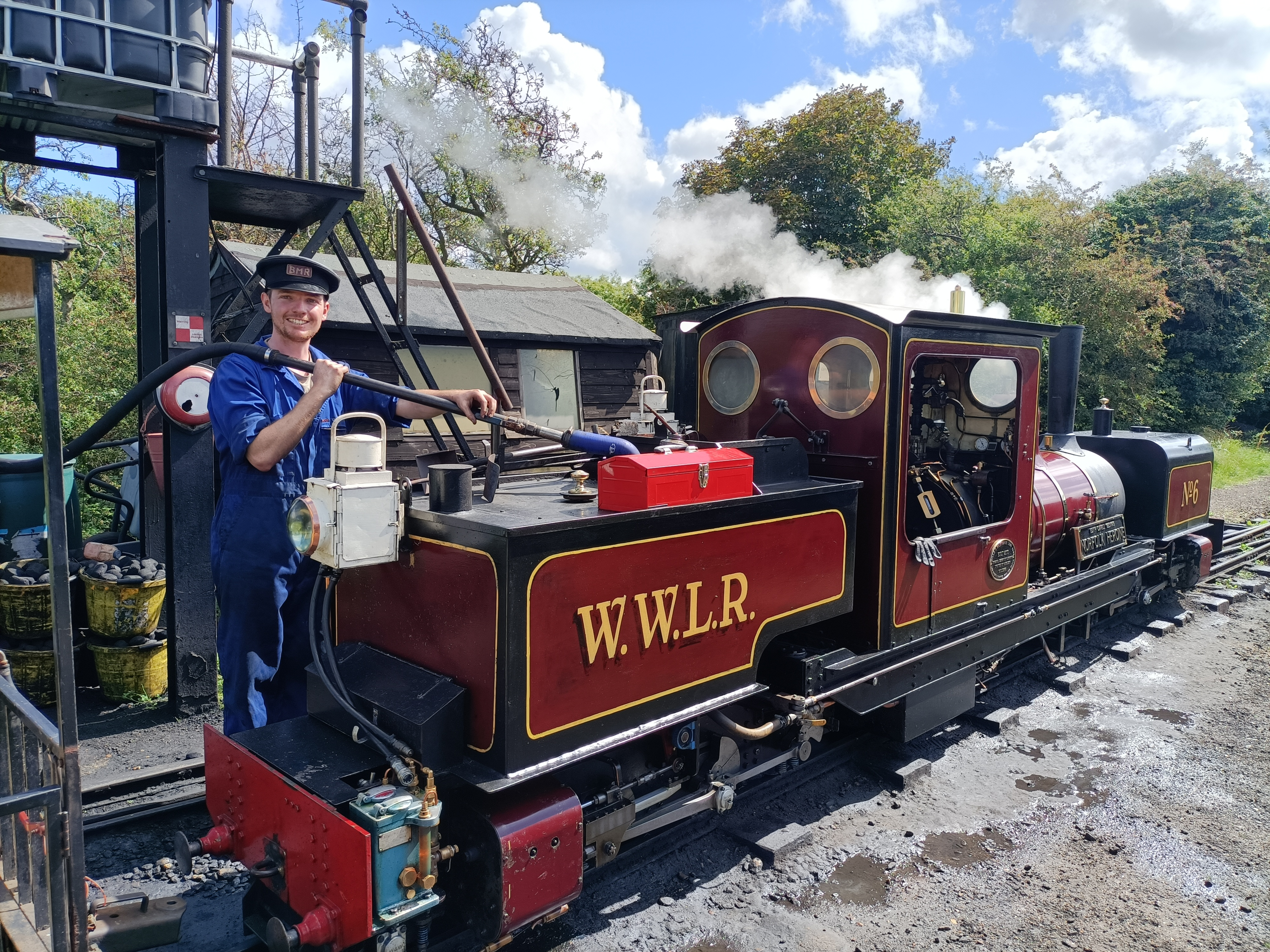
Driver refilling the water tank of the Norfolk Heroine at Wells

== Original (standard gauge) line ==
The Norfolk Railway established a line from Wymondham to Dereham in 1847, which the nominally independent Wells and Fakenham Railway extended to Walsingham and Wells-next-the-Sea ten years later, in 1857. During the consolidation of minor railway companies in England, the line became part of the Great Eastern Railway, and during the 1923 Big Four grouping became in turn part of the London and North Eastern Railway.

The Transport Act 1947 nationalised the British rail network, and the branch line became part of the Eastern Region of British Railways on 1 January 1948. The line's final steam passenger service ran on 17 September 1955, services then continued using Diesel units. The Beeching Report of 1963 recommended the retention of parts of the line for freight and express passenger services but recommended closure of all passenger facilities for local services. The local passenger service between Dereham and Wells ended on 5 October 1964.

== Preservation history (narrow gauge) ==
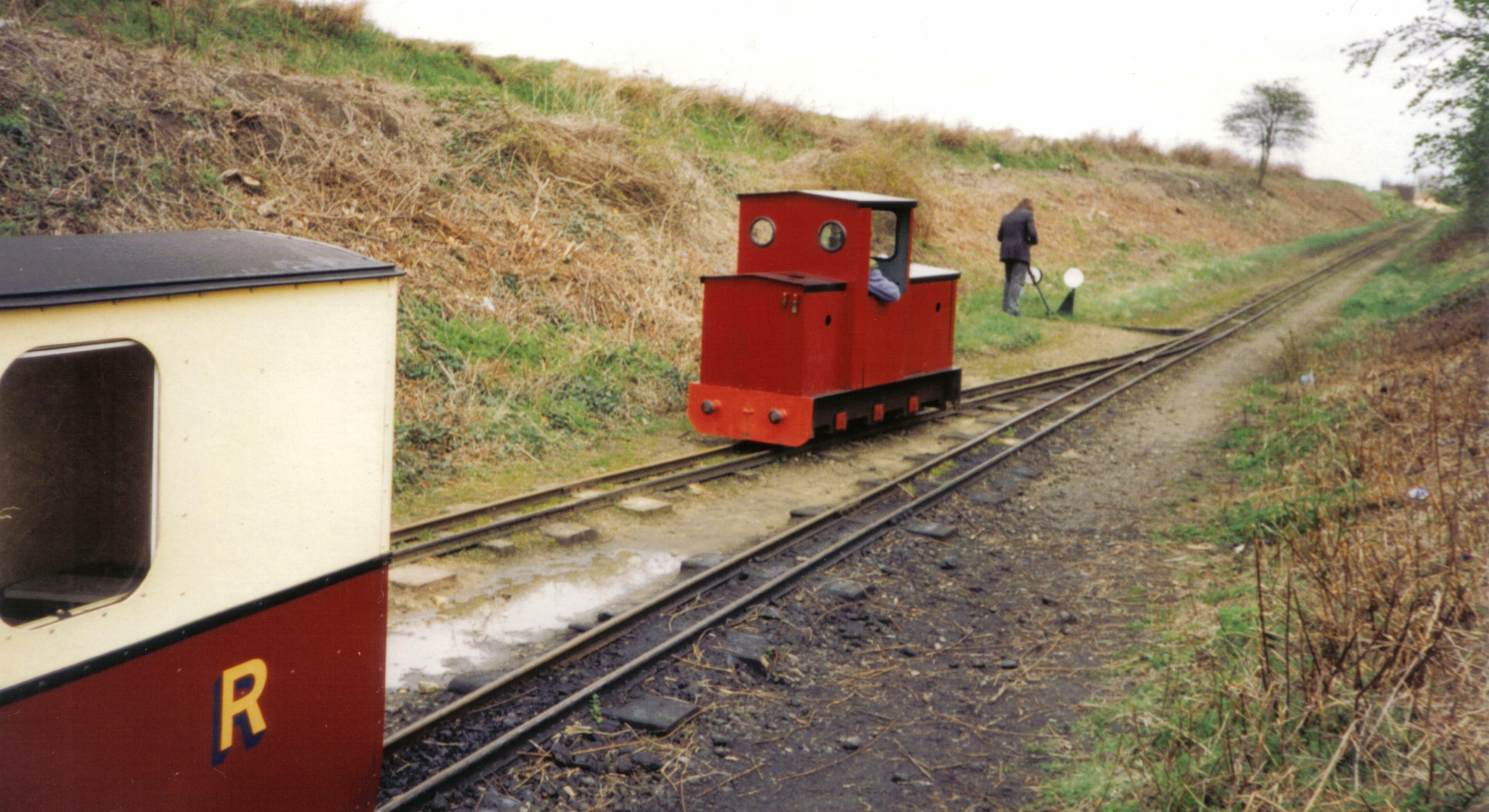
Weasel at Walsingham in the 1990s, before rebuilding.

Local railway enthusiast Lt Cdr Roy Francis had already built and opened the 10 1/4 in (260 mm) gauge Wells Harbour Railway in 1976, and in 1979 he set about restoration of the railway service south from Wells, towards Walsingham. Ground works and track laying took three years to complete, and the railway opened on 6 April 1982. A section of the route, known locally as 'Barnard's Cutting', had been filled with refuse and had to be excavated before the track could be restored. The excavation of 3,000 tons of waste did not return the trackbed to its original level, resulting in a severe 1 in 29 gradient that had not existed when the line was originally in use.

Significant developments during the history of the line have included the abandoning of locomotive turning facilities (the line was originally envisaged with turntables at both ends, and locomotives always operating in the forwards direction) in favour of the operationally simpler system of locomotives operating forwards on their outward journey, and backwards on their return journey, after running round the train by means of a headshunt and run-round loop. At the same time, Walsingham station was totally remodelled, with the platform on the opposite (western) side.

In 1987, a redundant signal box was moved from Swainsthorpe to Wells, and converted. The ground floor now provides a shop, tearoom, and waiting room, whilst the upper floor provides office and staff rooms.

In 2005, an intermediate station named Wighton was closed. At the same time the nearby intermediate station named Seton's Halt was renamed Wighton, which had been its original name in LNER operating days.

In 2013, construction began on a large new shed at Wells, which opened in 2014. This serves as a locomotive running shed during the summer, and as a coach storage shed during the winter. It has engineering facilities, including access to heavy lifting gear outside the shed. Two other engine sheds are available at Wells.

== Locomotives ==
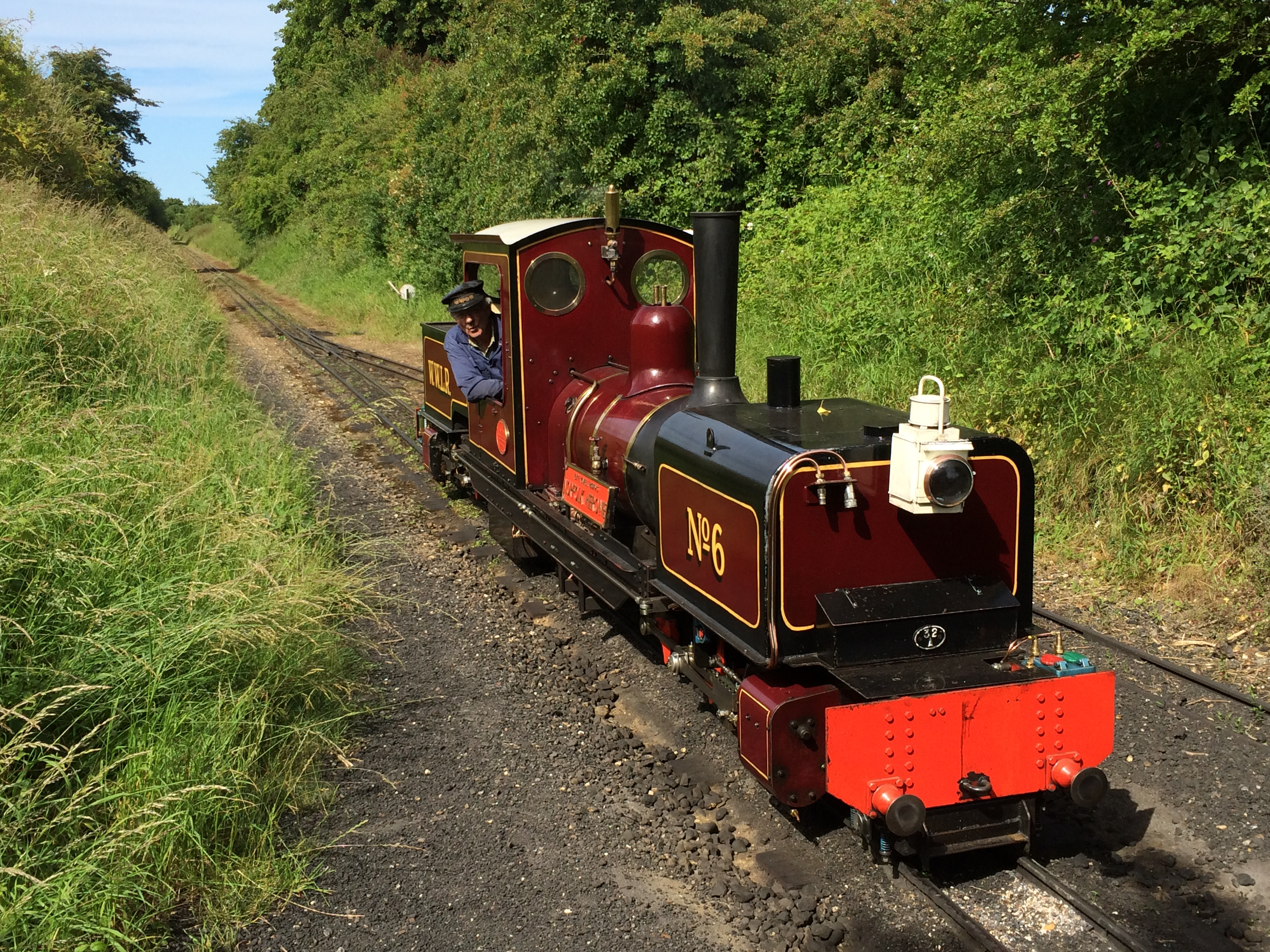
Wells & Walsingham Light Railway locomotive "Norfolk Heroine" entering Walsingham station, light engine.

=== Original locomotives ===
On 6 April 1982, purpose built steam locomotive No 1 Pilgrim, an 0-6-0T engine built for use on the line by David King Engineering at North Walsham, launched the public service. Pilgrim was the sole locomotive, although the nearby Wells Harbour Railway was an available source of alternative motive power in an emergency. In 1985 the diesel locomotive No 2 Weasel entered service as reserve engine, and for out-of-season operations, and engineering trains.

=== High powered locomotives ===
Growing passenger figures quickly necessitated more powerful engines. In 1986 two larger locomotives were built, entering service for the 1987 season; these were the new 2-6-0+0-6-2 Garratt locomotive No 3 Norfolk Hero and the Bo-Bo diesel locomotive No 4 Norfolk Harvester. These two engines provided the main service, with Weasel in reserve and out-of-season use, whilst Pilgrim was sold. The need for a second high-powered steam engine was quickly established and locomotive No 5 arrived on loan in 1995. This engine, which was never owned by the railway, had marginally different gauge standards (the range of measurements of elements of the wheelsets of a vehicle, in addition to the strict gauge from flange to flange), and proved unsuitable, as the newly established practice of running in reverse from Walsingham to Wells meant that the engine led with its tender, and the slightly different measurements, coupled with the lighter weight of the leading tender, led to the tender regularly derailing. The engine was little used, and eventually withdrawn, and plans were made to replicate the highly successful Garratt design of Norfolk Hero, with an order placed for locomotive No 6 Norfolk Heroine, which entered service in 2010.

With the planned future introduction of a two-train summer service, it is intended to have three steam locomotives on site. The railway's Garratts (No 3 and No 6) are the principal steam engines, and a third steam locomotive will be brought on site on loan; meanwhile original locomotive No 1 returned to the line in 2014, and is currently available for service at Wells.

=== Table of locomotives ===
Number	Name	Type	Configuration	Builder	Year built	Status	Notes	Photograph
1	Pilgrim	Steam	0-6-0T	David King	1981	Withdrawn	In service 1982 to 1986; and 2014 to 2019. Now based at Hastings Miniature Railway.	
2	Weasel	Diesel hydraulic	0-6-0DH	Alan Keef	1985	In service (off-season duties)	Perkins 2,000 cc engine. Tram engine bodywork.	
3	Norfolk Hero	Steam	2-6-0+0-6-2 Garratt	Neil Simkins	1986	In service (principal engine)	Superheated boiler. Name refers to Admiral Lord Nelson.	
4	Norfolk Harvester	Diesel	Bo-Bo	A Mills	1986	In service (principal and thunderbird engine)	Perkins marine engine. Rebuilt at Wells in 2005.	
5	Lady Jane Gray	Steam	0-4-0	Philip Gray	1995	Withdrawn	Never owned by W&WLR (loan engine).	
6	Norfolk Heroine	Steam	2-6-0+0-6-2 Garratt	Richard Coleby	2010	In service (principal engine)	Superheated boiler. Name refers to Edith Cavell.	

=== Other locomotives on site ===
In addition to the railway's own locomotives, one privately owned engine is currently on site at Wells. This is the 2-6-0 mogul type steam locomotive, simply called No 4, which was constructed in 2012 by Tony Martin, the chief engineer of the Wells and Walsingham Light Railway, using the former boiler of Norfolk Hero as the basis for the project. The mogul is rarely used on W&WLR passenger services, but can sometimes be observed operating privately on the railway, out of hours. In the summer of 2014 the railway was also in discussion with a second private owner about the possibility of a further locomotive being housed at Wells.

== Rolling stock ==
=== Passenger vehicles ===
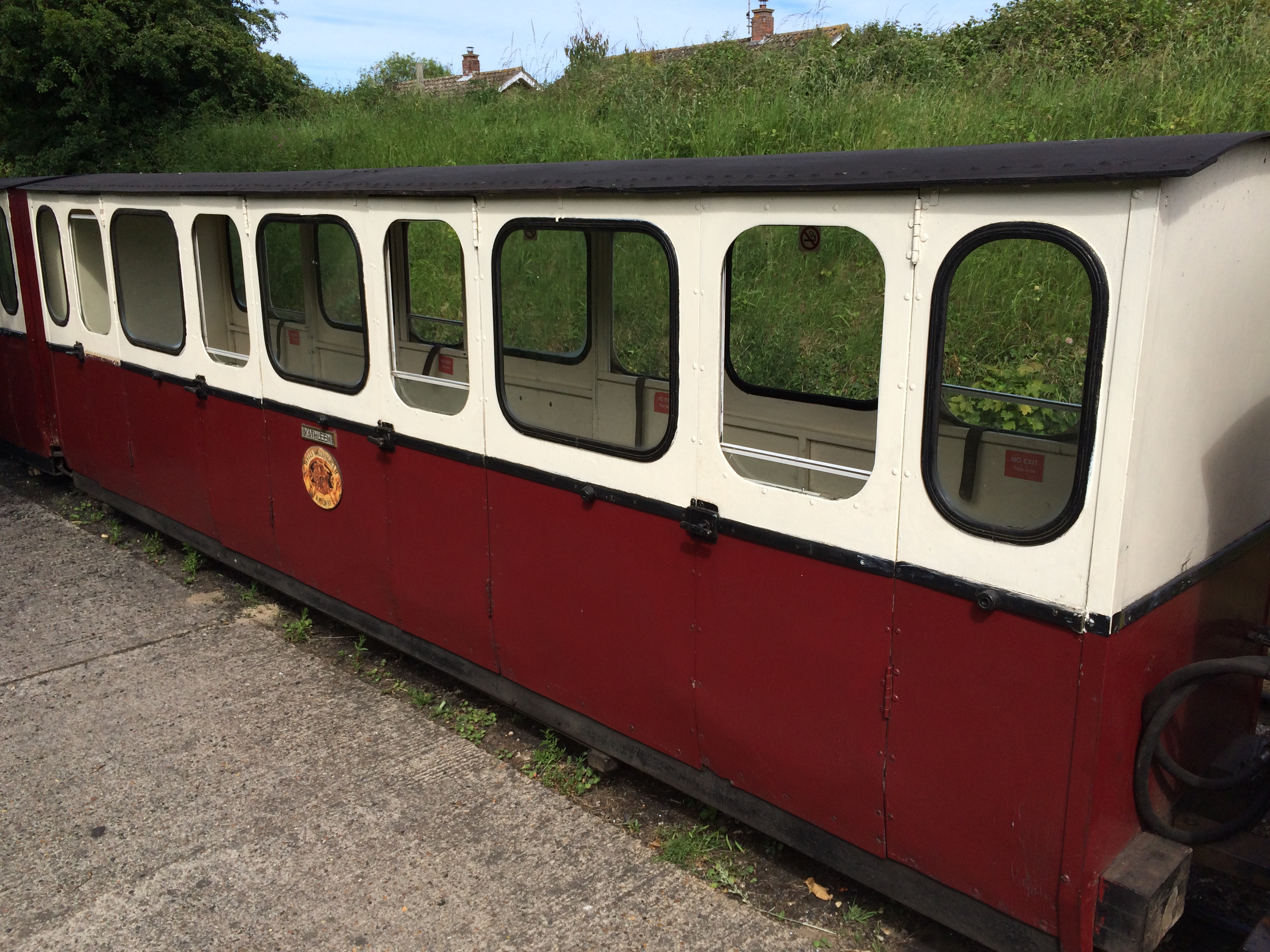
Enclosed saloon coach Kathleen.

The Wells and Walsingham Light Railway operates a fleet of comfortable passenger carriages, with adults sitting two-abreast in compartments with both facing and backward seating. A number of coach types is available as shown below. Most vehicles (apart from the Leek & Manifold coach) operate as articulated pairs.

The 1981 build coaches formed the original 4-coach train, and were built with doors on both sides, as was the 1985 build coach. All of these vehicles later had the doors on the eastern side of the train blocked off, as following the remodelling of Walsingham Station all surfaced platforms are located to the western side of the train. The 1987 build coaches were constructed with doors on only one side, as may be seen on the example still in service.

Two coach liveries are in use, as the railway works towards two train sets in operation. One set is maroon, or maroon and cream for vehicles which have upper panels (fully enclosed saloons). The new set under construction has a yellow livery based upon the traditional coach livery of the Leek & Manifold railway.

=== Table of Carriages ===
Type	Builder	Year built	Seating	Livery	Notes
Semi-open	DH & RJ King	1981	8 seats + guard compartment	Maroon	Carries nameplate "Saint Raphael".
Semi-open	DH & RJ King	1981	8 seats + guard compartment	Maroon	Carries nameplate "Philip Adrian Lait".
Open	DH & RJ King	1981	12 seats	Maroon	
Open	DH & RJ King	1981	12 seats	Maroon	
Semi-open	DH & RJ King	1985	12 seats	Maroon	Originally "Open", but later converted.
Open	DH & RJ King	1987	12 seats	Maroon	
Open	DH & RJ King	1987	12 seats	Maroon	No longer in service - body scrapped, frame available.
Enclosed saloon	Melvyn Mayes, Yaxham	1993	16 seats	Maroon	Carries nameplate "Kathleen".
Enclosed saloon	Melvyn Mayes, Yaxham	1993	12 seats + guard compartment	Maroon	Carries nameplate "Ignatius".
Enclosed saloon			8 luxury seats	Yellow	Leek and Manifold replica coach for private hire.
Semi-open	W&WLR (T Martin)	2016	12 seats + guard compartment	Yellow	Numbered WWCC1. Entered service summer 2016.
Semi-open	W&WLR (T Martin)	2016	12 seats + guard compartment	Yellow	Numbered WWCC2. Entered service summer 2016.
Semi-open			12 seats	Red	Acquired from Audley End Railway in summer 2020.
Semi-open			12 seats	Red	Acquired from Audley End Railway in summer 2020.
Semi-open			12 seats	Red	Acquired from Audley End Railway in summer 2020.
Semi-open			12 seats	Red	Acquired from Audley End Railway in summer 2020.
Semi-open			12 seats	Red	Acquired from Audley End Railway in summer 2020.

=== Engineering vehicles ===
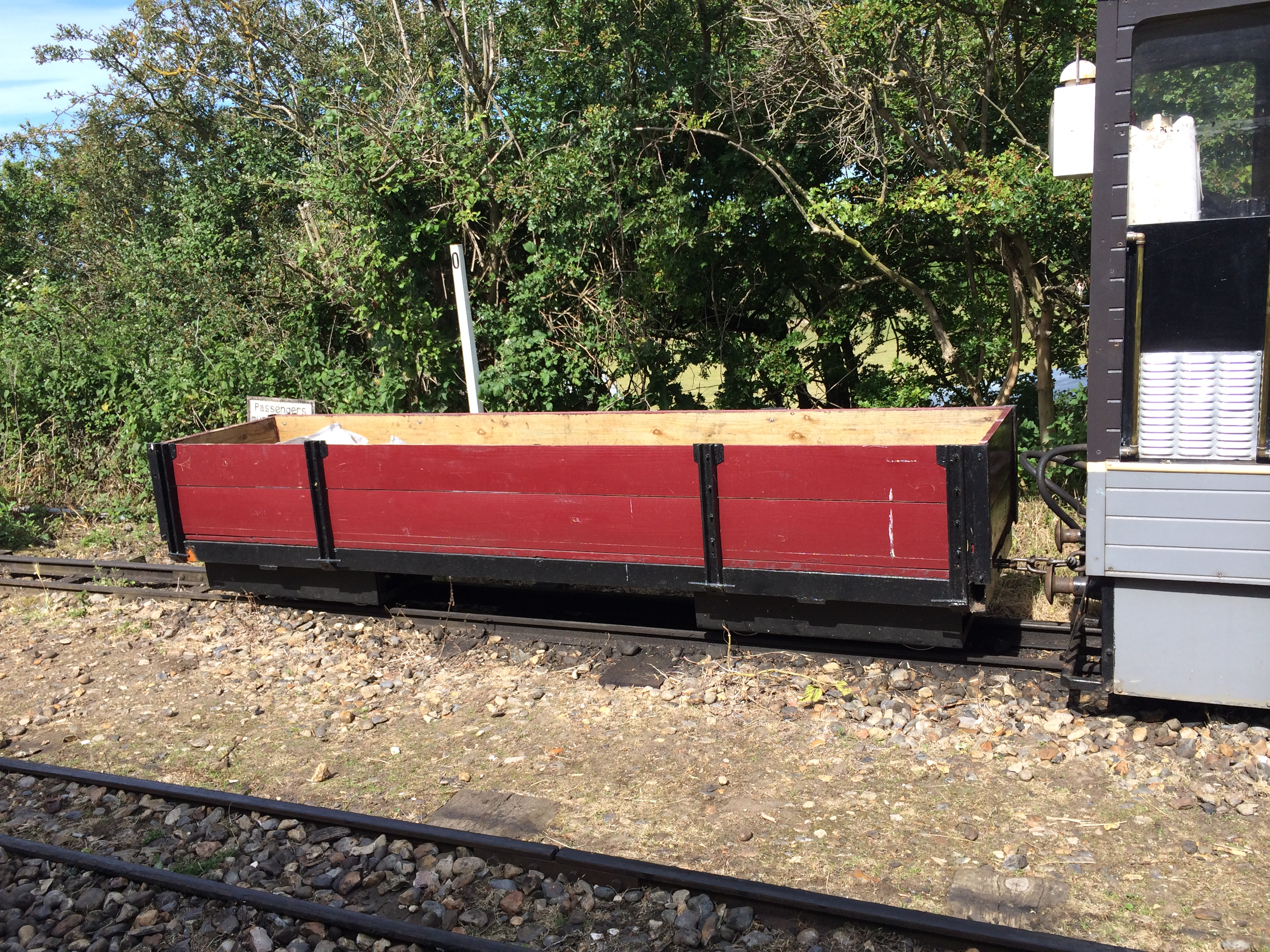
Bogie open wagon at Wells station.

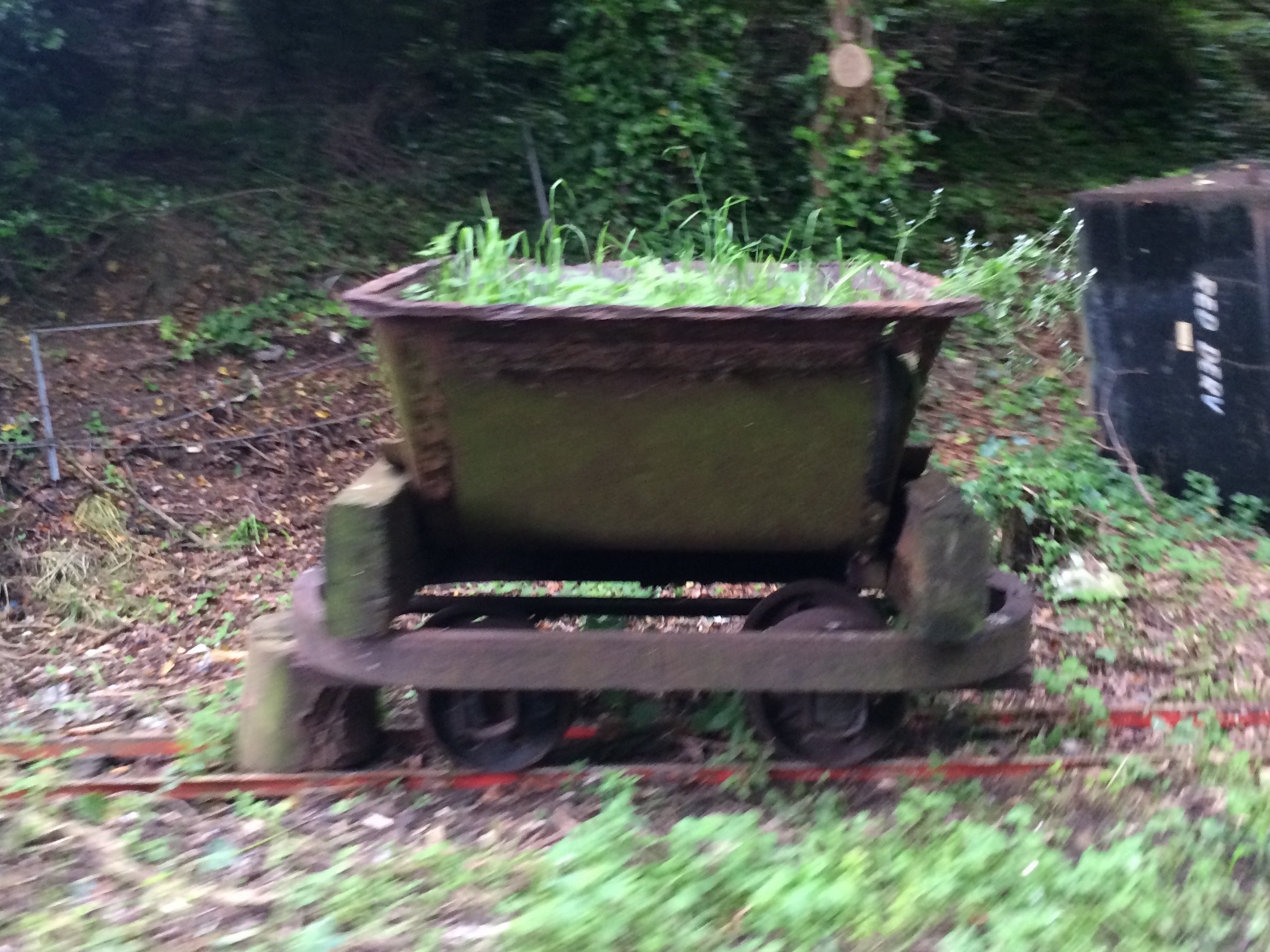
A redundant tipper wagon on a siding at Wells.

A number of wagons form a basic engineering fleet of rolling stock for use on maintenance trains, as shown below.

- Bogie open wagon, high-sided
- Bogie flat wagon
- 4-wheel weed-killer wagon (mounted with chemical tanks)
- 4-wheel open wagon, with tarpaulin cover
- 4-wheel flat wagon
- 4-wheel hand-operated works wagon
- 4-wheel tipper wagon (dilapidated - not in use)
- 4-wheel tipper wagon (dilapidated - not in use)

=== Standard gauge carriages (grounded bodies only) ===
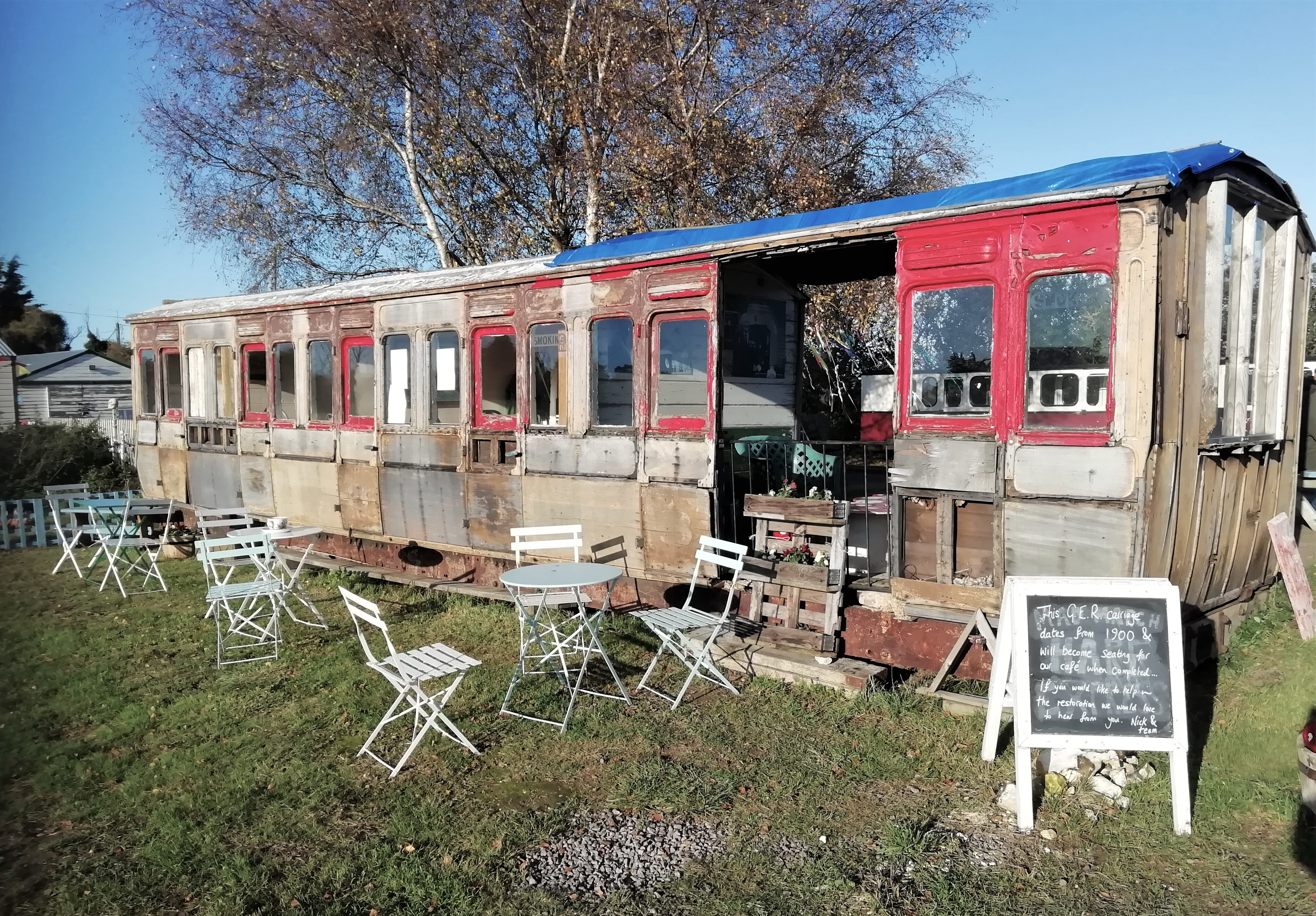
GER 995, in use as a station building at Wells.

Number	Type	Built	Builder	Built at	Notes
1560	Four wheel Third		Great Eastern Railway	Stratford	Originally intended as Tea Room seating, but poor condition meant it was used as a spares donor.
1540	Four wheel Third	1899	Great Eastern Railway	Stratford	Stored, unrestored.
936	Six wheel Third		Great Eastern Railway	Stratford	Stored, unrestored. Part of body side missing. Used as special event retail unit.
995	Six wheel Third		Great Eastern Railway	Stratford	Part of body side missing. Used as station building and catering seating.

== Incidents ==
On 2 September 2008 vandals blocked the flangeways of Barnard's crossing, near Walsingham and used a level crossing gate to derail locomotive No 3 Norfolk Hero. The passengers and train crew were not injured in this attack, and a diesel locomotive was sent from Wells to recover the stranded passenger train - although some passengers chose to ignore advice from the train crew and walked to Walsingham. Norfolk Hero was repaired and restored to service by the end of the month.

In December 2017 severe weather conditions led to a landslide near Warham. The large collapse of earth and mud engulfed locomotive No 6 Norfolk Heroine, but there were no injuries. Due to the extent of the landslide, it was necessary to abandon the train, which was recovered the following day. The locomotive required minor repairs, and volunteers formed a working party to dig out the mud, and return the line to usable condition. Following test trains in January 2018, the service was fully restored.

== Route description ==
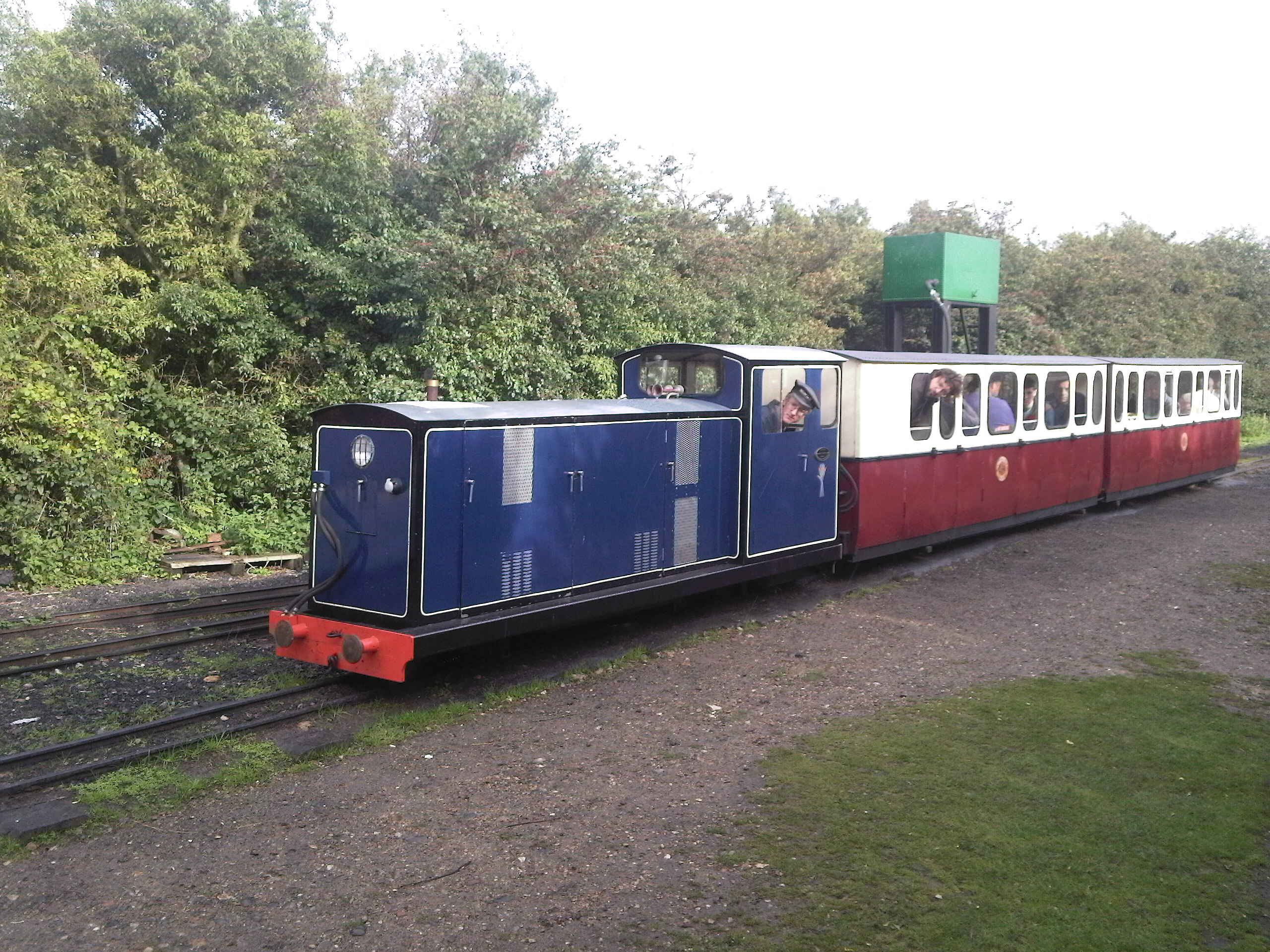
A winter diesel-hauled train arriving at Wells.

The current line starts at Wells station, on the A149 coast road just south of the town. After leaving the station trains begin to climb the 1 in 80 gradient to Warham, passing the remains of the Leicester Lime Works and The Midden Halt, a small request stop station serving a camp site, before passing under a road bridge carrying the Wells to Walsingham road.

At Warham the line starts to descend, and passes over a level crossing before reaching the request stop at Warham station. Chickens roam free around the station, and are often on the line as trains approach this very rural location. Leaving the station the line passes through a cutting, and under a road bridge (the site of Wighton Station from 1982 to 2005), then over an embankment close to the Warham Camp hill fort, before reaching the original and current Wighton station, which was temporarily renamed Seton's Halt between 1982 and 2005, when the alternative Wighton Station was in use. A passing loop is due to be installed at Wighton in 2016 to enable two-train operation on the line.

After three level crossings, 'Barnard's Cutting' is reached. The 1 in 29 gradient created during the restoration of the route has been restored to the original 1 in 60 by engineers from the National Construction Training College removing 17,000 tons of material in 1999.

After passing over a high embankment and a brick underbridge the line enters the outskirts of Little Walsingham, before arriving at Walsingham station.

== See also ==
- Bressingham Steam and Gardens
- Bure Valley Railway
- Mid-Norfolk Railway
- North Norfolk Railway
- Whitwell & Reepham railway station
- Yaxham Light Railway
- Barton House Railway

== Bibliography ==
- Oppitz, Leslie (Autumn 1989). "East Anglia Railways Remembered". book. Countryside Books.
- Jenkins, S. (1993). "The Lynn and Dereham Railway". book. Middleton Press.
- Tuddenham, E. (March 1965). "Railway World". book. Ian Allan.
