= Wells on Sea railway station =

Railway station in Norfolk, England

Wells on sea
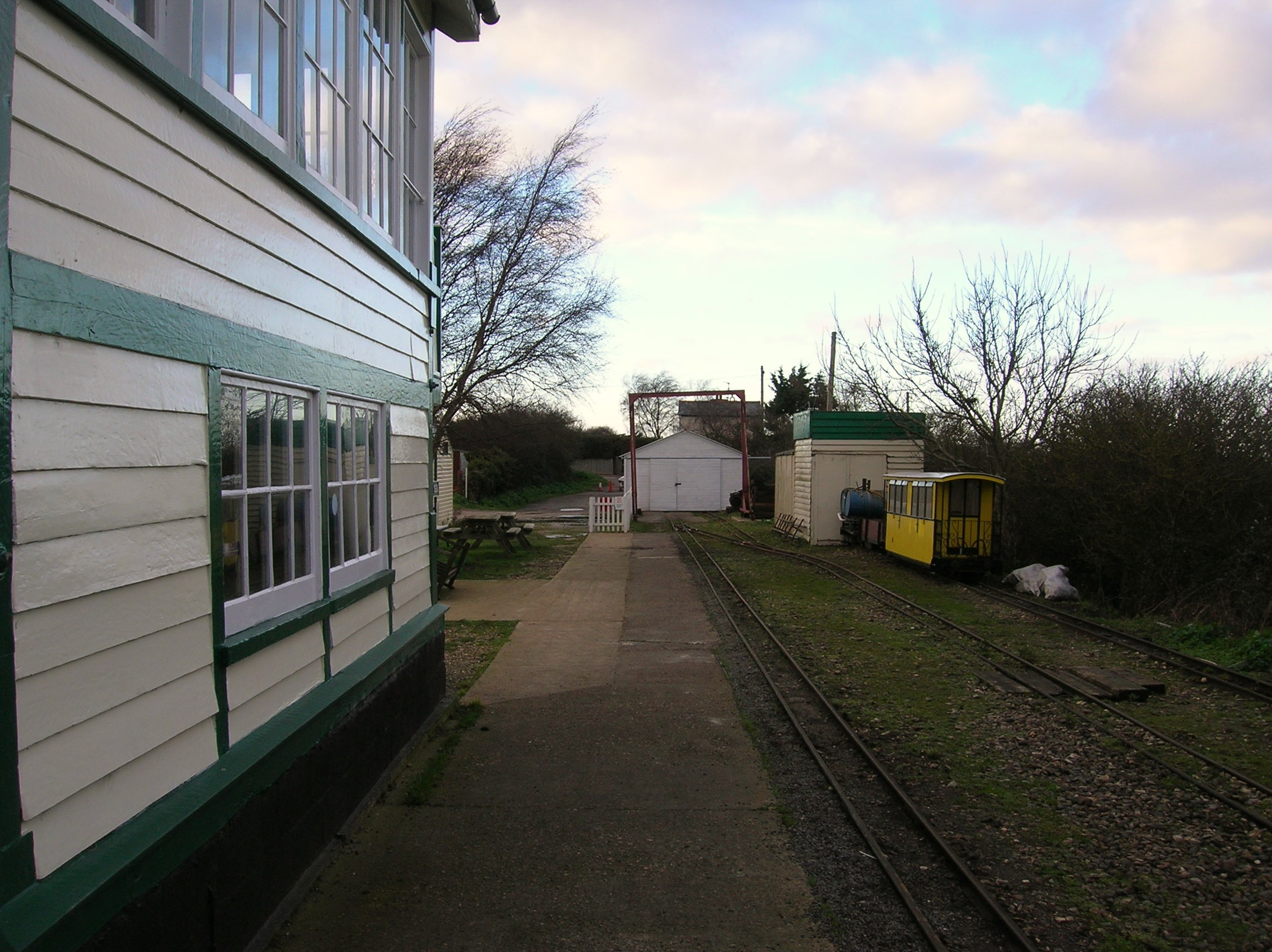
- Wells railway station, 2014

General information
- Location: Wells-next-the-Sea, North Norfolk, Norfolk; England
- Coordinates: 52°56′57″N 0°51′55″E
- Grid reference: TF925429
- System: Station on heritage railway
- Owner: Wells and Walsingham Light Railway
- Platforms: 1

Key dates
- 1982: Opened
Location

Wells on Sea railway station is located in Wells-next-the-Sea, Norfolk on the narrow gauge Wells and Walsingham Light Railway. It was opened in 1982. It is located south of the former level crossing on the A149 Coast Road, close to the former junction with the West Norfolk Junction Railway. The original station, which has been converted to non-rail use, is half a mile closer to the town.

== Passenger facilities ==
Passenger facilities consist of a single rail-level platform, a large car park, toilets (near the car park), and the ground floor of a formerly redundant signal box moved from Swainsthorpe to Wells, wherein a souvenir shop and tearoom are now situated, together with waiting room facilities.

== Operational facilities ==
A small yard, a water tower, storage sheds, and the main steam locomotive shed and works are all located at the southern end of the passenger station. At the northern end of the station there is a smaller secondary engine shed, generally used for the housing of the diesel locomotives. As of 2014 the northern depot also includes a large purpose-built shed with engineering facilities, lifting equipment, and powerful internal lighting. This shed is used as the winter (closed season) carriage shed, but during the summer (operating season) it becomes the main engineering works and locomotive running shed. Outside the new shed, on the site of the former turntable, a large overhead gantry has been installed (during 2014) for heavy lifting.

== Station plan ==
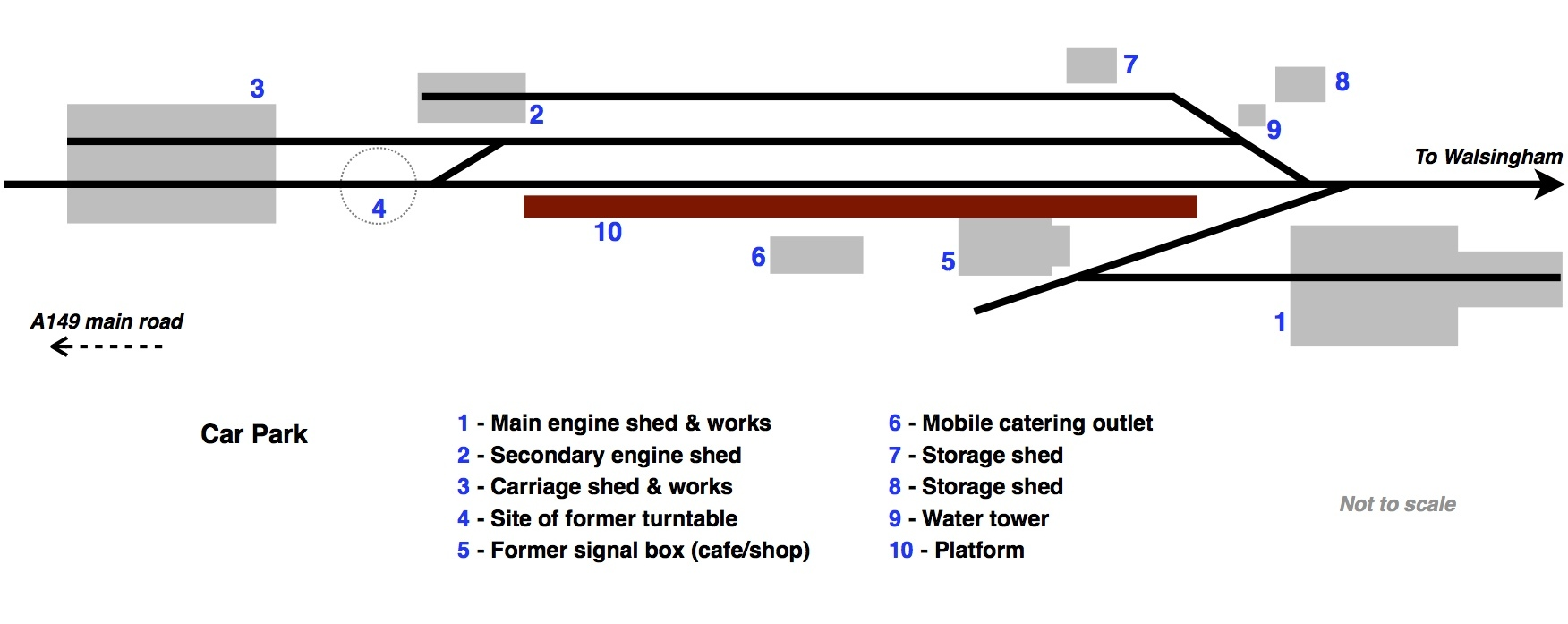

Preceding station	Heritage railways	Following station
Terminus	Wells & Walsingham Light Railway	The Midden Halt towards Walsingham
