= Walsingham (W&WLR) railway station =

Railway station in Norfolk, England, UK

Walsingham
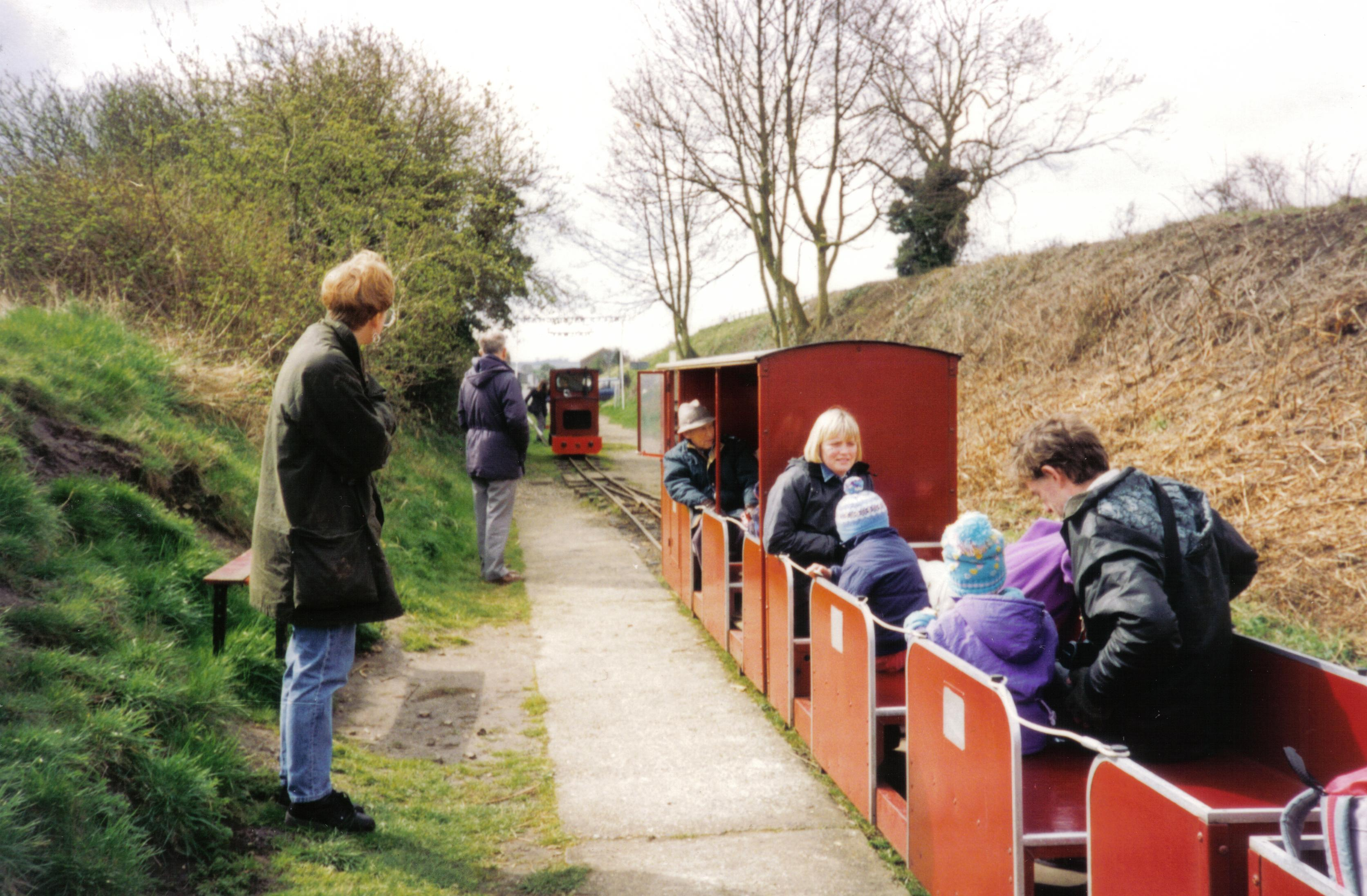
- Walsingham station on the Wells & Walsingham Railway. Circa 1990s.

General information
- Location: Walsingham, North Norfolk, Norfolk; England
- Coordinates: 52.897°N 0.872°E
- Grid reference: TF933371
- System: Station on heritage railway
- Owner: Wells and Walsingham Light Railway
- Platforms: 1

Key dates
- 1982: Opened
Location

Walsingham railway station is located in Walsingham, Norfolk, on the narrow gauge Wells and Walsingham Light Railway. It was opened in 1982. It is located north of the original station, which has been converted into a Russian Orthodox Church.

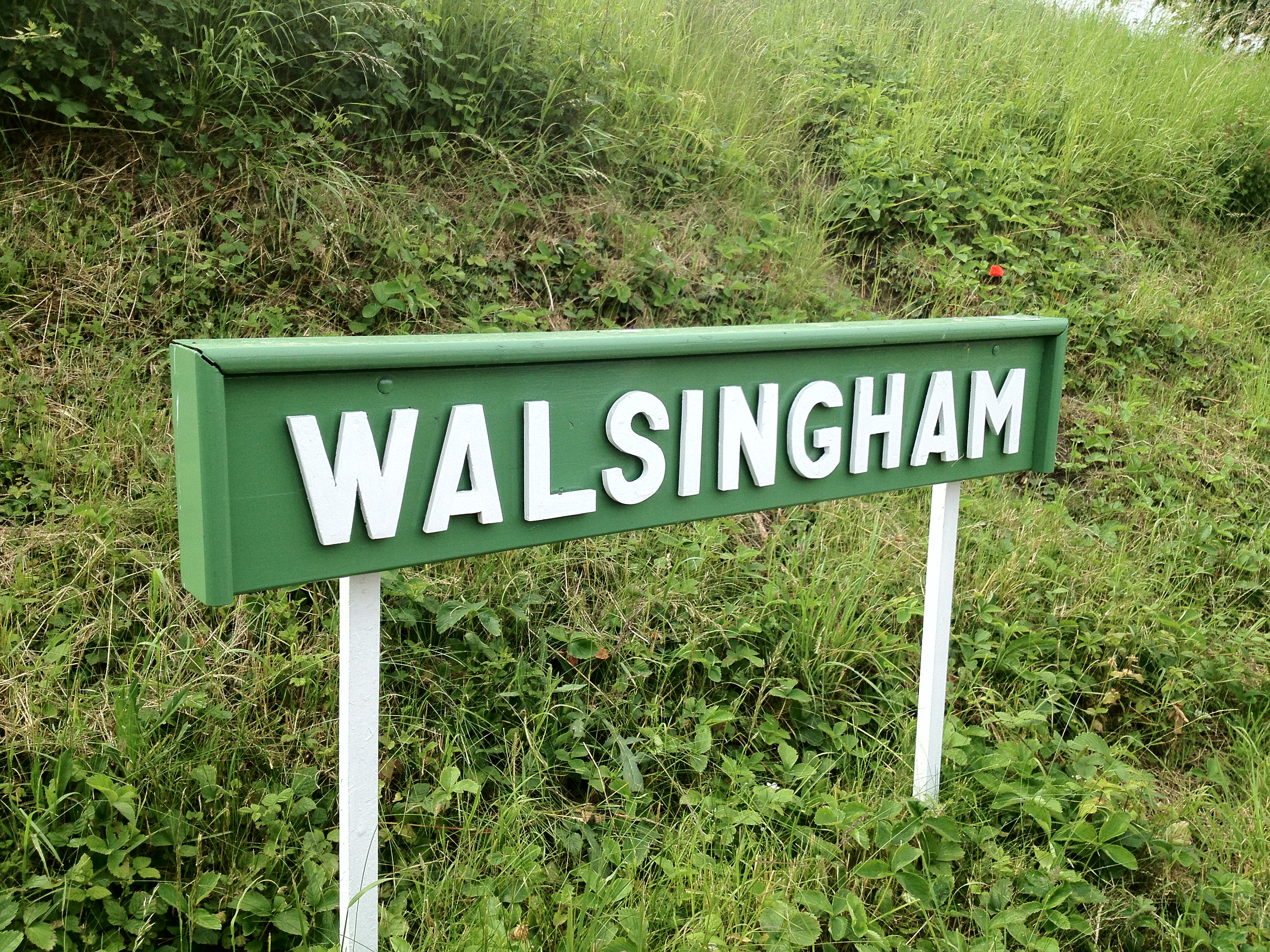
Station name board.

Operational rail facilities consist of a single running line, plus a headshunt and run round loop. There are no spring points, and access to the run round loop is controlled by ground frames, operated by the train crew. The station is not staffed, except on special operating days, and passengers purchase tickets from the guard.

Passenger facilities consist of a single rail-level platform, a waiting shelter, and a local information notice board and map.

The station was fully remodelled in the late 1980s, with the single platform relocated from the eastern to the western side of the running line.

Preceding station	Heritage railways	Following station
Wighton Halt towards Wells on Sea	Wells & Walsingham Light Railway	Terminus
