= Barton =

Barton may refer to:

== Places ==
=== Australia ===
- Barton, Australian Capital Territory, a suburb of Canberra
- Division of Barton, an electoral district in New South Wales
- Barton, Victoria, a locality near Moyston
- Barton River (Western Australia)

=== Canada ===
- Barton, Newfoundland and Labrador, community
- Barton, Nova Scotia, a community
- Barton Mine, an abandoned mine in Temagami, Ontario
- Barton Street (Hamilton, Ontario)

=== England ===
- Barton, Cambridgeshire, a village and civil parish
- Barton, Cheshire, a village and parish
- Barton, Cumbria, a hamlet and civil parish
- Barton, Gloucestershire, a village
- Barton and Tredworth, a district of Gloucester
- Barton, Isle of Wight
- Barton, Preston, a linear village and parish in Lancashire
- Barton (Kettering BC Ward), Northamptonshire
- Barton, North Yorkshire, a village and parish
- Barton, Oxfordshire, a suburb of Oxford
- Barton, Warwickshire, a village
- Barton, West Lancashire, a village
- Barton Broad, a broad and nature reserve in Norfolk
- Barton Hartshorn, Buckinghamshire
- Barton Hill, Bristol, a suburb
- Barton Hill, North Yorkshire, a village
- Barton in Fabis, Nottinghamshire
- Barton in the Beans, Leicestershire
- Barton-le-Clay, Bedfordshire, a large village and parish
- Barton-le-Street, North Yorkshire
- Barton-le-Willows, North Yorkshire
- Barton on Sea, Hampshire
- Barton Seagrave, a village in Northamptonshire
- Barton St David, Somerset
- Barton Turf, Norfolk
- Barton Turn, Staffordshire
- Barton-under-Needwood, Staffordshire
- Barton-upon-Humber, a town in Lincolnshire
- Barton upon Irwell, Greater Manchester
- Great Barton, a village in Suffolk
- Hayes Barton, a farmhouse in East Devon
- Marsh Barton, an area in Exeter, Devon
- Steeple Barton, a civil parish in Oxfordshire

=== Scotland ===
- Dumbarton, West Dunbartonshire, a town

=== United States ===
- Barton, Alabama, an unincorporated community
- Barton, Arkansas, an unincorporated community
- Barton Flats, California, an area of the San Bernardino National Forest
- Barton, Maryland, a town
- Barton City, Michigan, an unincorporated community
- Barton, Nebraska, an unincorporated community
- Barton, New Mexico, a census-designated place
- Barton, New York, a town
- Barton, North Dakota, an unincorporated community
- Barton, Ohio, an unincorporated community
- Barton, Oregon, an unincorporated community
- Barton, Vermont, a town
  - Barton (village), Vermont, a village within the town
- Barton, Wisconsin, a town
- Barton Dam, Michigan
- Barton River (Vermont), Vermont
- Barton Creek, Texas, a tributary of the Colorado River
- Barton Springs, Austin, Texas, four water springs
- Camp Barton, a Boy Scouts of America camp near Ithaca, New York
- Barton County, Kansas
- Barton County, Missouri
- Barton Township (disambiguation), several places
- Hayes Barton Historic District, a neighborhood in North Carolina

=== Elsewhere ===
- Barton (crater), Venus
- Barton Peninsula, South Shetland Islands
- Barton Creek (Belize)

== Businesses ==
- Barton Organ Company, an American theater pipe organ manufacturer
- Barton Transport, a ceased Nottinghamshire (UK) bus operating company
- Barton Brands, makers of liquor

== Schools ==
- Barton College, a private liberal arts college in Wilson, North Carolina, United States
- Barton Community College, Great Bend, Kansas, United States
- Barton Academy, Mobile, Alabama, United States, a school building on the National Register of Historic Places
- Barton Academy (Vermont), a former high school in Barton, Vermont, United States

== Ships ==
- USS Barton (DD-599), a destroyer
- USS Barton (DD-722), a destroyer
- Barton (ship), three sailing ships

== People and fictional characters ==
- Barton (surname), a list of people
- Bartoň, Czech surname
- Barton (given name), a list of people and fictional characters

== Other uses ==
- Barton (demesne), historically synonymous with a feudal demesne in the English West Country, now typically meaning a large farmhouse or the manor house
- Barton (horse), a racehorse
- Barton Highway, in New South Wales and the Australian Capital Territory
- "Barton", a song by Lisa Hannigan from At Swim
- Barton, a code name for a generation of AMD Athlon XP processors
- Barton Town, a virtual town in Gaia Online
- Barton Coliseum, a multi-purpose arena in Little Rock, Arkansas, United States
- Barton Beds, a geological layer in southern England
