= List of shipwrecks in September 1823 =

The list of shipwrecks in September 1823 includes all ships sunk, foundered, grounded, or otherwise lost during September 1823.

== 1 September ==
List of shipwrecks: 1 September 1823
Ship	State	Description
Traveller	United Kingdom	The ship capsized and sank off Hogland, Russia. Westmoreland (United Kingdom) rescued the crew.

== 4 September ==
List of shipwrecks: 4 September 1823
Ship	State	Description
Maria	Sweden	The ship was driven ashore on "Espskar". She was on a voyage from Dordrecht, South Holland, Netherlands, to Frederikshamn.
Penrhyn Castle	(United Kingdom of Great Britain and Ireland) British North America	The ship was wrecked on the coast of Newfoundland with the loss of a crew member. She was on a voyage from Quebec City, Lower Canada, to Halifax, Nova Scotia. Duck took her cargo to Quebec.

== 5 September ==
List of shipwrecks: 5 September 1823
Ship	State	Description
Annette	United Kingdom	The ship was driven ashore near "Lakken".
Uniao	Portugal	The brig was captured and sunk in the Atlantic Ocean by Netherhoy (Imperial Brazilian Navy). Her crew were taken aboard Netheroy and were later transferred to Paquette du Setúbal (Spain). She was on a voyage from São Miguel, Azores, to Lisbon.

== 7 September ==
List of shipwrecks: 7 September 1823
Ship	State	Description
Minerva	United Kingdom	The brig sprang a leak in the Atlantic Ocean off Land's End, Cornwall, and was beached in Whitesand Bay, where the leak was repaired, She was on a voyage from London to Liverpool, Lancashire.

== 8 September ==
List of shipwrecks: 8 September 1823
Ship	State	Description
Bom Sucesso Trinidade	Spain	The schooner was captured and sunk in the Atlantic Ocean by Netheroy (Imperial Brazilian Navy). Her crew were taken aboard Netheroy and were later transferred to Paquette du Setúbal (Spain). Bom Sucesso was on a voyage from Porto to St. Ubes, Portugal.
Brampton	(United Kingdom of Great Britain and Ireland) New South Wales	The ship was wrecked on the coast of New Zealand. All on board survived. She was on a voyage from Kororareka to Port Jackson when she was wrecked on a reef at the mouth of the Bay of Islands.

== 9 September ==
List of shipwrecks: 9 September 1823
Ship	State	Description
Barton	United Kingdom	The ship was wrecked on the west coast of Jutland. Her crew were rescued. She was on a voyage from Hull, Yorkshire, to Saint Petersburg, Russia.

== 10 September ==
List of shipwrecks: 10 September 1823
Ship	State	Description
Experiment	United Kingdom	The ship was driven ashore at Riga, Russia.
Prospect	United Kingdom	The ship was driven ashore at Riga.
Strenshall	United Kingdom	The ship was driven ashore and wrecked at Riga with some loss of life.

== 11 September ==
List of shipwrecks: 11 September 1823
Ship	State	Description
Fortuna	Greifswald	The ship ran aground and sank at Great Yarmouth, Norfolk, United Kingdom. She was on a voyage from Memel, Prussia, to Great Yarmouth.
Mary & Betsey	United States	The ship was driven ashore at Barataria, Trinidad. She was on a voyage from Jamaica to New Orleans, Louisiana.

== 12 September ==
List of shipwrecks: 12 September 1823
Ship	State	Description
Donna Roza	Portugal	The schooner was wrecked at Graciosa, Canary Islands.
Fox	(United Kingdom of Great Britain and Ireland) St. Thomas	The ship was abandoned in the Atlantic Ocean. Her crew were rescued by Minerve (France).

== 13 September ==
List of shipwrecks: 13 September 1823
Ship	State	Description
Anne	United Kingdom	The ship was driven ashore at Arbroath, Fife. Her crew were rescued. She was on a voyage from Inverkeithing to Arbroath.
Fox	United States	The schooner was wrecked in the Atlantic Ocean. Her crew were rescued on 19 September by Minerva (France). She was on a voyage from Rotterdam, South Holland, Netherlands, to St. Thomas, Virgin Islands.
Hunter	United Kingdom	The ship struck rocks at Wick, Caithness and was wrecked.

== 14 September ==
List of shipwrecks: 14 September 1823
Ship	State	Description
Alligator	France	The ship was wrecked on the Seskar Reef, in the Baltic Sea. She was on a voyage from Saint Petersburg, Russia, to Havre de Grâce, Seine-Inférieure.
Marie Sainte Anne	France	The ship foundered in the Bay of Biscay off Les Sables d'Olonne, Vendée. Her crew were rescued. She was on a voyage from Bordeaux, Gironde, to Rouen, Seine-Inférieure.
Monarch	United Kingdom	The ship was wrecked of St. Paul's Island, Lower Canada, British North America, with the loss of five of the 30 people on board. She was on a voyage from Aberdeen to Quebec City, Lower Canada.
Resolution	United Kingdom	The ship was wrecked on Cape St. Esprit, Nova Scotia, British North America, She was on a voyage from Liverpool, Lancashire, to Quebec City, Lower Canada, British North America.

== 15 September ==
List of shipwrecks: 15 September 1823
Ship	State	Description
Ann	United Kingdom	The ship was driven ashore in Quendale Bay, Shetland Islands. She was on a voyage from Arkhangelsk, Russia, to Belfast, County Antrim.
Louise	Sweden	The ship was driven ashore near Skagen, Denmark, and sank. She was on a voyage from Stockholm to "Lear".
Royal Oak	United Kingdom	The ship was wrecked at sea off Cape Rozier, British North America, with the loss of all but four of her crew. Survivors were rescued by Margaret (United Kingdom). Royal Oak was on a voyage from Quebec City, Lower Canada, British North America, to Hull, Yorkshire.
Suffolk	United States	The ship was wrecked on Saint Lucia. Her crew were rescued. She was on a voyage from Demerara to New York.

== 17 September ==
List of shipwrecks: 17 September 1823
Ship	State	Description
Sophie	France	The ship was beached at Havre de Grâce, Seine-Inférieure, where she was wrecked. She was on a voyage from Cardiff, Glamorgan, United Kingdom, to Rouen, Seine-Inférieure.

== 18 September ==
List of shipwrecks: 18 September 1823
Ship	State	Description
Betsey	United Kingdom	The ship struck the Rose Sand, in the North Sea off the coast of Lincolnshire and sank. Her crew were rescued.

== 19 September ==
List of shipwrecks: 19 September 1823
Ship	State	Description
Ann Lucy	United Kingdom	The ship was lost near Mazagan, Morocco. She was on a voyage from London to Mogador, Morocco
Brothers	United Kingdom	The smack was driven ashore and wrecked near Workington, Cumberland. Her crew were rescued.

== 21 September ==
List of shipwrecks: 21 September 1823
Ship	State	Description
Diligence	United Kingdom	The sloop was wrecked on the Mew Stone, Devon. Her crew were rescued. She was on a voyage from Exeter to Plymouth.

== 22 September ==
List of shipwrecks: 22 September 1823
Ship	State	Description
Friends	United Kingdom	The ship was driven ashore and severely damaged at Penzance, Cornwall. She was on a voyage from London to Bideford and Barnstaple, Devon.
Swift	United Kingdom	The brig foundered in the North Sea 15 nautical miles (28 km) north north east of North Foreland, Kent. Her crew were rescued by Wabah (United States). She was on a voyage from Sunderland, County Durham, to Guernsey, Channel Islands.

== 23 September ==
List of shipwrecks: 23 September 1823
Ship	State	Description
Duke of York	United Kingdom	The ship was wrecked at sea in a hurricane. All 20 people on board were rescued on 29 September by Louisa (United Kingdom). Duke of York was on a voyage from Saint John, New Brunswick, British North America, to Liverpool, Lancashire.
Elizabeth	United Kingdom	The ship was wrecked on the West Hoyle Bank, in Liverpool Bay. Her crew were rescued. She was on a voyage from Richibucto, New Brunswick, to Chester, Cheshire.

== 24 September ==
List of shipwrecks: 24 September 1823
Ship	State	Description
Agnes	United Kingdom	The ship was abandoned at the mouth of Strangford Lough. Her crew were rescued.
Ionia	Ottoman Empire	The sloop-of-war, a brig, was wrecked off Marseille, Bouches-du-Rhône, France. Her 51 crew were rescued.

== 25 September ==
List of shipwrecks: 25 September 1823
Ship	State	Description
Atlas	United Kingdom	The ship sprang a leak and was beached in the River Hooghly, where she sank. She was on a voyage from London to Bengal, India. Atlas was refloated on 18 December and taken in to Calcutta, India, for repairs.
Hope	United Kingdom	The ship was driven ashore on Miscou Island, New Brunswick, British North America. She was later refloated and taken in to Miramichi, New Brunswick.

== 26 September ==
List of shipwrecks: 26 September 1823
Ship	State	Description
Ann	United Kingdom	The ship was abandoned in the North Sea 45 nautical miles (83 km) off Buchan Ness, Aberdeenshire. Her crew were rescued by Louise (United Kingdom). Ann was on a voyage from Gothenburg, Sweden, to Grangemouth, Stirlingshire.
Flora	(United Kingdom of Great Britain and Ireland) Guernsey	The ship was wrecked near Thisted. Her crew were rescued. She was on a voyage from Rio de Janeiro, Brazil, to Copenhagen, Denmark.

== 29 September ==
List of shipwrecks: 29 September 1823
Ship	State	Description
Ariadne	(United Kingdom of Great Britain and Ireland) British North America	The ship was driven ashore at Carbonear, Newfoundland.
Carbonear	(United Kingdom of Great Britain and Ireland) British North America	The ship was driven ashore at Carbonear.
Cottager	(United Kingdom of Great Britain and Ireland) British North America	The ship was driven ashore at St. John's, Newfoundland.
Ebenezer	(United Kingdom of Great Britain and Ireland) British North America	The ship was driven ashore at St. John's.
Lady Hughes	United Kingdom	The ship was run down and sunk by Grace (United Kingdom) at Holyhead, Anglesey. Her crew were rescued.
Louisa	United Kingdom	The ship was wrecked on Læsø, Denmark. Her crew were rescued. She was on a voyage from Leith, Lothian, to Stettin, Prussia.
Mariner	(United Kingdom of Great Britain and Ireland) British North America	The ship was driven ashore and wrecked in Placentia Bay. Her crew were rescued.
Potton	United Kingdom	The ship ran onshore in the Hooghly River on her way from London and it was feared she was lost. However, she was got off and instead was lost in 1829.
Wilderspool	United Kingdom	The ship was wrecked in Cemaes Bay with the loss of all hands. She was on a voyage from Newry, County Antrim, to Bangor, Caernarfonshire.

== 30 September ==
List of shipwrecks: 30 September 1823
Ship	State	Description
Constitution	United Kingdom	The ship was driven ashore near Waterford. She was on a voyage from Swansea, Glamorgan, to Waterford. Constitution was refloated on 3 October.
Fawler	United Kingdom	The ship was wrecked at Varberg, Sweden. She was on a voyage from Saint Petersburg, Russia, to London.

== Unknown date ==
List of shipwrecks: Unknown date in September 1823
Ship	State	Description
Bee	United Kingdom	The ship collided with Jupiter (United Kingdom) and foundered in the North Sea. Her crew were rescued.
Cœvullus	Netherlands	The full-rigged ship was wrecked at "Mono", Brazil, 40 nautical miles (74 km) south of Bahia.
Cosmopolite	France	The ship foundered off the Île de Batz, Finistère. Her crew were rescued. She was on a voyage from Rouen, Seine-Inférieure to Nantes, Loire-Inférieure.
Essex	United States	The ship was wrecked in the Abaco Islands. Her crew survived. She was on a voyage from Providence, Rhode Island, to Havana, Cuba.
Franklin	United States	The brig was wrecked in the Abaco Islands. Her crew survived. She was on a voyage from Philadelphia, Pennsylvania, to Pensacola, Florida.
Jonge Frederica	Netherlands	The sloop foundered in the North Sea 12 leagues (36 nautical miles (67 km) east of Texel, North Holland. Her four crew were rescued by General Jackson (United States). Jonge Frederica was on a voyage from Trondheim, Norway, to Amsterdam, North Holland.
Magloire	France	The ship was lost at Saint-Domingue.
Maria	United Kingdom	The ship departed from Llanelli, Glamorgan, for Hayle, Cornwall, in mid-September. Believed subsequently wrecked in the Bristol Channel off Lundy Island, Devon, with the loss of all hands.
Patactico St. Antonio Vigilante	Portugal	The ship was captured, plundered and sunk in the Atlantic Ocean between Lisbon and the Azores by Netherhoy (Imperial Brazilian Navy).
Swan	United Kingdom	The ship was abandoned in the Atlantic Ocean between 5 and 14 September. She was on a voyage from Quebec City, Lower Canada, British North America, to London.
