= Bergon =

Bergon is a surname. Notable people with the surname include:

- Frank Bergon (born 1943), American writer
- Paul Bergon (1863–1912), French photographer, musician, and naturalist

== See also ==
- Bergin
- Bergön, Swedish island in the far north of the Bay of Bothnia
- Berton
