= Barton (ship) =

Several ships have been named Barton:

- Barton (1794 ship) was a Liverpool-based West Indiaman that USS Syren captured and burned on 28 May 1814.
- Barton (1801 ship) was a Liverpool-based slave ship that the French captured late on her second voyage transporting enslaved people.
- Barton (1810 ship) was a Liverpool-based West Indiaman that wrecked in 1836 and was last listed in 1837.
- Barton (1811 ship) was based at Hull, traded with the West Indies and India, and was lost in 1823 off Jutland.

== See also ==
- USS Barton, two United States Navy destroyers
- SS Clara Barton, a World War II Liberty ship
