= Berton =

Berton is a both a surname and a given name. Notable people with the name include:

== As a surname ==
- Alain Berton, (1912–1979), French chemical engineer specialized in toxicology
- Annibale Berton (1936–2004), Italian Olympic canoeist
- George Frederick Street Berton (1808–1840), Canadian lawyer from New Brunswick
- Giuseppe Berton (1932–2013), Italian missionary
- Henri Berton (fl. 1908), French Olympic archer
- Henri-Montan Berton (1767–1844), French composer
- John Berton (contemporary), American computer graphics animator and visual effects artist
- Liliane Berton (1924–2009), French opera singer and recording artist
- Louis des Balbes de Berton de Crillon, 1st Duke of Mahón (1717–1796), French soldier during the Seven Years' War; later joined the Spanish army
- Louis des Balbes de Berton de Crillon (1541–1615), French soldier
- Marie-Hélène Crombé-Berton (born 1960), Belgian politician of the Mouvement Réformateur party
- Pierre Berton (1920–2004), Canadian author, historian, and journalist
- Pierre Montan Berton (1727–1780), French composer and conductor, father of Henri Montan Berton
- Sean Berton (born 1979), American professional football player
- Stefania Berton (born 1990), Italian figure skater and ice dancer
- Vic Berton (1896–1951), American jazz drummer

== As a given name ==
- Berton Averre (born 1952), American rock guitarist
- Berton Braley (1898–1956), German poet
- Berton Churchill (1876–1940), Canadian actor
- Berton E. Spivy Jr. (1911–1997), United States Army general
- Berton Roueché (1910–1994), American medical writer
- John Berton Carnett (1890–1988), American surgeon

== See also ==
- Burton (name)
- Barton (surname)
- Barton (given name)
