= List of shipwrecks in December 1840 =

The list of shipwrecks in December 1840 includes ships sunk, foundered, wrecked, grounded, or otherwise lost during December 1840.

== 1 December ==
List of shipwrecks: 1 December 1840
Ship	State	Description
August Wilhelm	United Kingdom	The ship was wrecked on Syra, Greece. She was on a voyage from Rio de Janeiro, Brazil to Kronstadt.
Chunaub	United Kingdom	The ship was sunk by ice in the Baltic Sea off Seskar, Russia. Her crew were rescued. She was on a voyage from London to Saint Petersburg, Russia. She was refloated in the spring of 1842 and taken into Saint Petersburg.
Eleutheria	United Kingdom	The ship was driven ashore on "Crane Island", British North America. She floated off on 3 December.
Emma	United Kingdom	The barque sank at Constantinople, Ottoman Empire with the loss of all hands.
Minerva	Ottoman Empire	The steamship foundered in the Sea of Marmara with the loss of all on board.
Neva	Russia	The steamship was wrecked at "Kila", Ottoman Empire with the loss of nineteen of the 27 people on board. She was on a voyage from Odesa to Constantinople.
Robert Symms	United Kingdom	The schooner was wrecked at Constantinople with the loss of four of her eight crew.
Seri Pervas	Austrian Empire	The steamship was driven ashore in the Gulf of Mudania at "Arundli", Ottoman Empire with the loss of ten lives. Over 550 people were rescued. She was on a voyage from Constantinople, Ottoman Empire to Beyrout, Syria. Seri Pervas was refloated in late March or early April 1841 and towed into Constantinople.
St. Mary	United Kingdom	The ship was driven ashore near Saint John, New Brunswick, British North America. She was on a voyage from Baltimore, Maryland, United States To Saint John. St. Mary was later refloated.

== 2 December ==
List of shipwrecks: 2 December 1840
Ship	State	Description
Bristol	United Kingdom	The ship was driven ashore on Souter Point, County Durham. She was on a voyage from Cardiff, Glamorgan to North Shields, County Durham. Bristol was refloated and towed into North Shields.
Hero	United Kingdom	The ship was wrecked off "Portillo", Cuba. Her crew were rescued.
Impartial	United Kingdom	The brig was driven ashore at Lønstrup, Denmark. Her ten crew were rescued. She was on a voyage from Saint Petersburg, Russia to Newcastle upon Tyne, Northumberland.
Larch or Sarah	United Kingdom	The barque was lost in the Magdalen Islands, Nova Scotia, British North America with the loss of three of her crew. She was on a voyage from Miramichi, New Brunswick, British North America to a European port.
Mary	(United Kingdom of Great Britain and Ireland) New South Wales	The whaler, a barque, was wrecked on Lachlan Island with the loss of six of her 26 crew.
Plenty	United Kingdom	The ship struck the Seven Stones Reef and foundered with the loss of all hands.
Thetis	United Kingdom	The ship was driven ashore at Helsingør, Denmark. She was on a voyage from Memel, Prussia to Dundee, Forfarshire. Thetis was refloated and resumed her voyage.
HMS Zebra	Royal Navy	HMS Zebra. The Cruizer-class brig-sloop was driven ashore and wrecked at Haifa, Syria with the loss of three of her crew.

== 3 December ==
List of shipwrecks: 3 December 1840
Ship	State	Description
Armadillo	United States	The brig ran aground at North Shields, County Durham, United Kingdom. She was on a voyage from North Shields to New York. Armadillo was refloated on 5 December and put back to North Shields for repairs.
Hebe	United Kingdom	The ship was wrecked on the Gunfleet Sand, in the North Sea off the coast of Essex. Her crew were rescued by HMRC Desmond ( Board of Customs). Hebe was on a voyage from Stockton-on-Tees, County Durham to London.
Hibernia	United Kingdom	The ship ran aground off Hayling Island, Hampshire. She was on a voyage from London to Portsmouth, Hampshire. Hibernia was refloated the next day and taken into Portsmouth.
S'Gravenhage	Netherlands	The ship ran aground on the Pampus. She was on a voyage from Hellevoetsluis, Zeeland to Batavia, Netherlands East Indies.
Thomas and Mary	United Kingdom	The schooner ran aground on the Gunfleet Sand. She was on a voyage from South Shields, County Durham to London. Thomas and Mary was refloated and taken into Harwich, Essex.

== 4 December ==
List of shipwrecks: 4 December 1840
Ship	State	Description
Argyle	United Kingdom	The ship ran aground on the Burbo Bank, in Liverpool Bay. She was on a voyage from Liverpool, Lancashire to Wicklow.
Hinds	United Kingdom	The ship was run into by a steamship in the River Thames and was consequently beached.
Wave	United Kingdom	The ship ran aground on the Gull Rock. She was on a voyage from Glasgow, Renfrewshire to Lisbon, Portugal. Wave was refloated and taken into Greenock, Renfrewshire.

== 5 December ==
List of shipwrecks: 5 December 1840
Ship	State	Description
Argyle	United Kingdom	The steamship was wrecked on the "Arrecipe del Medio", off the coast of Mexico with the loss of a crew member.

== 6 December ==
List of shipwrecks: 6 December 1840
Ship	State	Description
Henrique	France	The ship was beached at Plymouth, Devon, United Kingdom. She was on a voyage from Ramsgate, Kent, United Kingdom to Naples, Kingdom of the Two Sicilies.
Prompt	United Kingdom	The ship was driven ashore at Seaton Sluice, Northumberland. She was on a voyage from Seaton Sluice to London. Prompt was refloated on 8 January 1841.

== 7 December ==
List of shipwrecks: 7 December 1840
Ship	State	Description
Ann and Mary	United Kingdom	The ship was driven ashore and damaged at Stranraer, Wigtownshire.
Belle Alliance	Belgium	The ship was beached in Bigbury Bay. She was on a voyage from Antwerp to St. Ubes, Portugal. She was refloated on 14 December and taken into Plymouth, Devon, United Kingdom for repairs.
Countess of Mulgrave	United Kingdom	The barque was driven ashore on Goose Island. She was on a voyage from Quebec City, Lower Canada, British North America to Bristol, Gloucestershire.
Countess of Westmoreland	United Kingdom	The ship was driven ashore near St. Peter's, Nova Scotia, British North America. She was on a voyage from Charlottetown, Prince Edward Island, British North America to an English port. She had been refloated by 22 December and taken into port.
Elbe	Denmark	The ship was wrecked on the Goodwin Sands, Kent. All eleven people on board were rescued by the fishing smack Laurel (United Kingdom). Elbe was on a voyage from Havre de Grâce, Seine-Inférieure, France to Newcastle upon Tyne, Northumberland.
Eliza	United Kingdom	The ship was wrecked on Cape Sable Island, Nova Scotia, British North America. All on board were rescued. She was on a voyage from Pictou, Nova Scotia to Glasgow, Renfrewshire.
Esperance	France	The brig was driven ashore and wrecked at Salcombe, Devon, United Kingdom. Her eight crew were rescued by the Coast Guard. She was on a voyage from Adra, Spain to Dunkirk, Nord.
Glencoe	United Kingdom	The ship was driven ashore and wrecked at Ballymacaw, County Cork. Her eleven crew were rescued. She was on a voyage from Glasgow, Renfrewshire to Calcutta, India.
Howard	United Kingdom	The brig was driven ashore at Teignmouth, Devon with the loss of a crew member. She was on a voyage from Miramichi, New Brunswick, British North America to Teignmouth.
Leisk	United Kingdom	The ship was driven ashore at Bonmahon, County Waterford. She was on a voyage from Málaga, Spain to Glasgow. She was refloated on 23 March 1841 and taken into Waterford.
Lord Abercrombie	United Kingdom	The ship was driven ashore at Workington, Cumberland. She was on a voyage from Liverpool, Lancashire to Workington. Lord Abercrombie was refloated on 9 December and taken into Workington.
Monarch	United Kingdom	The barque was driven ashore on Goose Island. She was on a voyage from Quebec City to Hull, Yorkshire.
Victoria	United Kingdom	The ship was driven ashore at Shoreham-by-Sea, Sussex. She was on a voyage from Shoreham-by-Sea to London. Victoria was refloated on 10 December and taken into Shoreham-by-Sea.
William McLeod	United Kingdom	The schooner was wrecked at Liverpool, Nova Scotia, British North America.

== 8 December ==
List of shipwrecks: 8 December 1840
Ship	State	Description
Gesina	Prussia	The ship was driven ashore in the Weser. She was on a voyage from Pillau to Bremen.
Ida	United Kingdom	The ship ran aground on the Isle of Arran, Buteshire and was damaged. She was on a voyage from Quebec City, Lower Canada, British North America to Cork. She was refloated.
Jasper	United Kingdom	The ship was beached at Pwllheli, Caernarfonshire. She was on a voyage from Saint John, New Brunswick, British North America to Pwllheli.

== 9 December ==
List of shipwrecks: 9 December 1840
Ship	State	Description
Australia	United Kingdom	The ship was driven ashore crewless on Cape Sable Island, Nova Scotia, British North America. Her crew had previously been rescued by Ottawa (United Kingdom).
Elizabeth	United Kingdom	The ship sank at Carlisle, Cumberland. She was on a voyage from Carlisle to Douglas, Isle of Man.
Glory	United Kingdom	The ship was driven ashore at Calais, France. She was on a voyage from Altona to Dundalk, County Louth.
Hanover	United Kingdom	The ship was driven ashore at Beerhaven, County Cork. She was on a voyage from Baltimore, Maryland, United States to Liverpool, Lancashire.
Lionel	France	The ship was wrecked at Port-Vendres, Pyrénées-Orientales. Her crew were rescued. She was on a voyage from Marseille, Bouches-du-Rhône to New Orleans, Louisiana, United States.
Lucy	United Kingdom	The brig was wrecked on the Ilha do Sal, Cape Verde Islands. Her crew survived. She was on a voyage from Liverpool to Valparaíso, Chile.
Pomona	Hamburg	The yacht struck the wreck of Isabella (Portugal) in the Elbe and was wrecked. She was on a voyage from Hamburg to Gibraltar.
Stamper	United Kingdom	The ship was driven ashore in Wigtown Bay. She was on a voyage from Quebec City, Lower Canada, British North America to Maryport, Cumberland. She was refloated on 12 January 1841.

== 10 December ==
List of shipwrecks: 10 December 1840
Ship	State	Description
America	(United Kingdom of Great Britain and Ireland) British North America	The ship was driven ashore and wrecked near Crookhaven, County Cork. She was on a voyage from Quebec City, Lower Canada to Liverpool Lancashire.
Eve	United Kingdom	The ship was driven ashore at Finkenwerder. She was on a voyage from Hamburg to Liverpool. Eve was refloated the next day and put back to Hamburg.
Lady of the Lake	United Kingdom	The ship was driven ashore at the mouth of the River Alde. She was refloated on 12 December and taken into Aldeburgh, Suffolk.
Perthshire	United Kingdom	The ship ran aground on the Codling Bank, in the Irish Sea off the coast of County Dublin and was abandoned. She was on a voyage from Liverpool to Havana, Cuba.
Spring	United Kingdom	The ship ran aground on the Blacktail Bank, in the North Sea off the coast of Essex. She was refloated the next day and proceeded for London.
Triumphante	Portugal	The ship departed from Liverpool for Porto. No further trace, presumed foundered with the loss of all hands.

== 11 December ==
List of shipwrecks: 11 December 1840
Ship	State	Description
Amelia	United Kingdom	The ship was driven ashore at Twielenfleth, Kingdom of Hanover. She was on a voyage from Goole, Yorkshire to Hamburg. Amelia was refloated and taken into Hamburg.
Cayman	United Kingdom	The steamship was holed by her anchor and sank at Dundalk, County Louth. She was on a voyage from Liverpool, Lancashire to Demerara, British Honduras.
Denia, or Desire	France	The schooner was driven ashore and wrecked at Brixham, Devon, United Kingdom with the loss of three of her ten crew. She was on a voyage from Boulogne, Pas-de-Calais to Marseille, Bouches-du-Rhône.
Europe	United Kingdom	The brig was driven ashore at Brixham, where she became a wreck. Her crew were rescued. She was on a voyage from London to the Levant.
Hope	United Kingdom	The whaler, a barque, ran aground and was wrecked at "Toutaville", in the Navigators Islands. Her crew survived.
Isabella	United Kingdom	The ship was driven ashore at Schulau, Kingdom of Hanover. She was on a voyage from London to Hamburg. Isabella was refloated and towed into Hamburg.
Novelty	(United Kingdom of Great Britain and Ireland) British North America	The ship was driven ashore in the "Mubon River". She was on a voyage from Miramichi, New Brunswick to Cork. Novelty was refloated and taken into Port Hood, Nova Scotia.

== 12 December ==
List of shipwrecks: 12 December 1840
Ship	State	Description
British Queen	United Kingdom	The schooner was driven ashore on Scarba, Argyllshire. She was on a voyage from Dublin to Newcastle upon Tyne, Northumberland.
Satellite	United Kingdom	The schooner was driven ashore in the Scheldt. She was on a voyage from Antwerp, Belgium to Hull, Yorkshire. She was refloated later that day.

== 13 December ==
List of shipwrecks: 13 December 1840
Ship	State	Description
Clemence et Julia Cadoret	France	The ship was wrecked on a reef south west of Bermuda. She was on a voyage from Cartagena, Republic of New Granada to a French port.
Fame	United Kingdom	The ship ran aground on the Cross Sand, in the North Sea off the coast of Norfolk. She was on a voyage from Rye, Sussex to Newcastle upon Tyne, Northumberland.
Lady Rolle	United Kingdom	The ship was driven ashore and severely damaged at Pendennis Castle, Cornwall. She was on a voyage from a Welsh port to Plymouth, Devon. She was refloated on 15 December and beached at Falmouth, Cornwall.
Severn	United Kingdom	The ship departed from Calcutta, India for China. No further trace, presumed foundered with the loss of all hands.
Trader	United Kingdom	The ship was driven ashore in Freshwater Bay. She was on a voyage from Milford Haven, Pembrokeshire to Bristol, Gloucestershire. Trader was refloated on 15 December.

== 14 December ==
List of shipwrecks: 14 December 1840
Ship	State	Description
Oscar	Sweden	The ship was driven ashore in the Scheldt. She was on a voyage from Stockholm to Antwerp, Belgium. She was refloated on 22 December.
Snowden	United Kingdom	The paddle steamer was damaged by fire at Liverpool, Lancashire.
Sophia	Sweden	The ship ran aground on the Kentish Knock. Her crew were rescued. She was on a voyage from Gävle to Honfleur, Calvados, France. Sophia was refloated and taken into the Hanfleet Water, and then to Harwich, Essex, United Kingdom.
Thomas	United Kingdom	The ship ran aground on the Spit Sand, in the Bristol Channel and was consequently beached at Portishead, Somerset. She was on a voyage from Newport to Chepstow, Monmouthshire. Thomas was refloated on 21 December and taken into Bristol.
Traveller	United Kingdom	The ship ran aground on a reef off the Abaco Islands. She was on a voyage from London to Nassau, Bahamas. She was refloated on 17 December and taken into Nassau.
HMS Weazel	Royal Navy	The Cherokee-class brig-sloop was driven ashore at Cephalonia, United States of the Ionian Islands. She was on a voyage from St. Maur to Cephalonia. She was refloated and taken into Cephalonia.

== 15 December ==
List of shipwrecks: 15 December 1840
Ship	State	Description
Contente	Hamburg	The ship was driven ashore at Schulau, Kingdom of Hanover. She was on a voyage from Sunderland, County Durham to Hamburg.

== 16 December ==
List of shipwrecks: 16 December 1840
Ship	State	Description
Flora	Norway	The ship was driven ashore and wrecked at "Battalen" with the loss of two of her crew. She was on a voyage from Altona to Bergen.
Mary Dickson	United Kingdom	The ship struck the Wheaton Rock and was abandoned by her crew. She was on a voyage from Kirkwall, Orkney Islands to Sligo, Mary Dickson was subsequently taken into Sligo.

== 17 December ==
List of shipwrecks: 17 December 1840
Ship	State	Description
Catherine	United Kingdom	The ship was wrecked in the Caramata Passage off East Island, Spanish East Indies. Her crew were rescued by Cheber (flag unknown).
Friend's Regard	United Kingdom	The brig was wrecked on the Gunfleet Sand, in the North Sea off the coast of Essex. Her crew were rescued by Adonis (United Kingdom).
Industry	United Kingdom	The ship was wrecked on the Roaring Middle Sand, in the North Sea. Her crew were rescued. She was on a voyage from Seaham, County Durham to King's Lynn, Norfolk.
Isabella	United Kingdom	The brig was wrecked on the Gunfleet Sand.
Jane	United Kingdom	The ship was driven ashore at São Miguel Island, Azores. Her crew were rescued.
Jarrow	United Kingdom	The brig ran aground on the Gunfleet Sand. She floated off but consequently foundered. Her eight crew were rescued.
Jeune Elisabeth	France	The ship was driven ashore by ice at Saint-Nazaire, Loire-Inférieure.
Locheil	United Kingdom	The brig was wrecked on the Maplin Sand, in the North Sea off the coast of Essex. Her twelve crew were rescued. by eight smacks, including Fair Traveller, George & Eliza and Henry and Elizabeth (all United Kingdom) She was on a voyage from South Shields, County Durham to London.
London	United Kingdom	The ship ran aground of the Black Tail Bank, in the North Sea and was damaged. She was on a voyage from Stockton-on-Tees, County Durham to London. London was refloated.
Mary Jane	United Kingdom	The ship was driven ashore on "Bomar". She was later refloated.
Ruckers	United Kingdom	The ship ran aground in the River Thames. She was on a voyage from Demerara, British Honduras to London. Ruckers was refloated on 24 December.
Unity	United Kingdom	The ship was wrecked on the Roaring Middle Sand with the loss of two of her three crew. The survivor was rescued by Renown (United Kingdom). Unity was on a voyage from Goole, Yorkshire to King's Lynn.
Victoria	United Kingdom	The ship ran aground off Reposaari, Grand Duchy of Finland. She was on a voyage from London to Pori, Grand Duchy of Finland.
Vine	United Kingdom	The brig was in collision with London (United Kingdom) in the River Thames at Rotherhithe, Kent. she was consequently beached. Vine was on a voyage from Woodbridge, Suffolk to London.

== 18 December ==
List of shipwrecks: 18 December 1840
Ship	State	Description
Active	United Kingdom	The brig was driven ashore and wrecked at Hopton-on-Sea, Norfolk. Her crew were rescued by rocket apparatus.
Albion	United Kingdom	The ship was driven ashore in the River Tyne and was damaged.
Bristol	United Kingdom	The ship was abandoned in the North Sea 12 nautical miles (22 km) north of the Dudgeon Bank. Her seven crew were rescued by Frances Ann (United Kingdom). Bristol was on a voyage from Hartlepool, County Durham to London.
Elizabeth	United Kingdom	The ship was wrecked on the Gunfleet Sand, in the North Sea off the coast of Essex. Her crew were rescued.
Fame	United Kingdom	The ship ran aground on the Cross Sand, in the North Sea off the coast of Norfolk. She was refloated and taken into Great Yarmouth, Norfolk.
Flora	United Kingdom	The ship was driven ashore west of Margate, Kent. She was on a voyage from Ramsgate, Kent to Dundee, Forfarshire. Flora was refloated the next day and taken into The Swale.
Ino	United Kingdom	The brig was driven ashore near Beachy Head, Sussex and was abandoned by her crew. She was on a voyage from Stockton-on-Tees, County Durham to Shoreham-by-Sea, Sussex. Ino was refloated and taken into Shoreham-by-Sea.
Kilmarnock	United Kingdom	The ship was driven ashore and damaged at Blyth, Northumberland. She was on a voyage from London to Blyth. Kilmarnock had become a wreck by 30 December.
Lark	United Kingdom	The ship was driven ashore at Lowestoft, Suffolk. She was refloated on 31 December and taken into Lowestoft.
Nelson	United Kingdom	The schooner was driven ashore at Hopton-on-Sea. Her six crew were rescued by rocket apparatus.
Oak	United Kingdom	The ship was driven ashore at Corton, Suffolk. She was on a voyage from London to Hull, Yorkshire. Oak was refloated on 31 December and taken into Great Yarmouth, Norfolk.
Patrician	Norway	The ship was driven ashore and severely damaged by ice at Seskar, Russia.
Ruby	United Kingdom	The ship was wrecked on the Blue Caicos. Her crew were rescued. She was on a voyage from Liverpool, Lancashire to New Orleans, Louisiana, United States.
Sarah and Martha	United Kingdom	The ship was driven ashore and damaged at Lowestoft. She was refloated on 26 December.
Susannah	United Kingdom	The ship ran aground on the Andrews Sand, in the North Sea off the coast of Essex. She was on a voyage from Great Yarmouth to London. Susannah was refloated and taken into Harwich, Essex.
William and Maria	United Kingdom	The ship was in collision with Pomona and foundered off the Isles of Scilly with the loss of a crew member. She was on a voyage from Cork to London.

== 19 December ==
List of shipwrecks: 19 December 1840
Ship	State	Description
Caroline	United Kingdom	The ship ran aground off Penzance, Cornwall and was damaged. She was on a voyage from Gloucester to Truro, Cornwall Caroline was refloated and taken into Penzance.
Caroline	Hamburg	The ship was severely damaged by ice at Cuxhaven. She was on a voyage from Havana, Cuba to Hamburg.
Clyde	United Kingdom	The paddle steamer caught fire at A Coruña, Spain and was scuttled. She was on a voyage from Newcastle upon Tyne, Northumberland to Gibraltar and Marseille, Bouches-du-Rhône, France.
Isabella	(United Kingdom of Great Britain and Ireland) New South Wales	The barque was driven ashore on the south west coast of King Island, Van Diemen's Land. The 25 people on board survived. She was on a voyage from Calcutta, India to Sydney.
Samuel Gould	United Kingdom	The ship was driven ashore 18 nautical miles (33 km) south of Cape Henry, Virginia, United States. She was on a voyage from Jamaica to Norfolk, Virginia.

== 20 December ==
List of shipwrecks: 20 December 1840
Ship	State	Description
Angelicania	United Kingdom	The ship was driven ashore in Studland Bay. She was on a voyage from Sunderland, County Durham to Poole, Dorset.
Isabella	United Kingdom	The barque was wrecked on King Island, Van Diemen's Land. She was on a voyage from Calcutta, India to Adelaide, South Australia and Sydney, New South Wales.
John Clarke	United Kingdom	The ship was driven ashore at Eastbourne, Sussex and was abandoned by her crew. She was on a voyage from Stockton-on-Tees, County Durham to Shoreham-by-Sea, Sussex. John Clarke was refloated and taken into Newhaven, Sussex.

== 21 December ==
List of shipwrecks: 21 December 1840
Ship	State	Description
Abbotsford	United Kingdom	The ship was driven ashore and wrecked at Shoeburyness, Essex. Her crew were rescued. She was on a voyage from Sunderland, County Durham to "Oldhaven".
Luna	United Kingdom	The ship capsized with the loss of five of her crew. She was on a voyage from Halifax, Nova Scotia, British North America to Saint Vincent, Virgin Islands.

== 22 December ==
List of shipwrecks: 22 December 1840
Ship	State	Description
British Queen	United Kingdom	The schooner was wrecked in the Gulf of Corryvreckan. She was on a voyage from Dublin to Inverness.
Dorothy	United Kingdom	The ship was driven ashore at Bangor.
Otto	Bremen	The ship was driven ashore in the Weser. She was on a voyage from Antwerp, Belgium to Bremen. Otto was refloated and beached near "Jurgum".
Union	United Kingdom	The ship was on Mort Point, Devon with the loss of four of her five crew. She was on a voyage from Southampton, Hampshire to Newport, Monmouthshire.
Venoni	United Kingdom	The ship was abandoned off Cape Clear, Cornwall. Her crew were rescued by Ace of Trumps (United Kingdom). Venoni was on a voyage from Newport, Monmouthshire to Milford Haven, Pembrokeshire.
Vriede en Hoop	Stettin	The ship was abandoned in the North Sea. Her crew were rescued. She was on a voyage from Stettin to Guernsey, Channel Islands.

== 23 December ==
List of shipwrecks: 23 December 1840
Ship	State	Description
Brian Born	United Kingdom	The schooner was driven ashore at Holyhead, Anglesey. She was on a voyage from Dublin to Liverpool, Lancashire.
Maria Theresa	Flag unknown	The ship was abandoned in the Baltic Sea off Swinemünde, Prussia. She was taken into Colberg on 4 January 1841.
Minerva	Brazil	The brig struck rocks and sank at Rio de Janeiro.

== 24 December ==
List of shipwrecks: 24 December 1840
Ship	State	Description
Eugenia	United Kingdom	The ship was wrecked at sea. All on board were rescued by Garrick (United States). Eugenia was on a voyage from Saint John, New Brunswick, British North America to Dublin. Eugenia came ashore at Clifden, County Galway on 18 April 1841 and broke up.
Fiddler	United Kingdom	The paddle steamer, a tug, caught fire and sank in the River Thames at Gravesend, Kent. Her crew were rescued.
John	United Kingdom	The ship was wrecked on Wood Island, British North America. She was on a voyage from Saint John, New Brunswick to Belfast, County Antrim.
Ross	United States	The ship departed from New York for Lisbon, Portugal. No further trace, presumed foundered with the loss of all hands.

== 25 December ==
List of shipwrecks: 25 December 1840
Ship	State	Description
Jupiter	United Kingdom	The brig was driven ashore and sank at Whitby, Yorkshire. She was refloated.

== 26 December ==
List of shipwrecks: 26 December 1840
Ship	State	Description
Silksworth	United Kingdom	The ship ran aground on the Burbo Bank, in Liverpool Bay and was damaged. She was on a voyage from Saint Petersburg, Russia to Liverpool, Lancashire. Silksworth was refloated and taken into Liverpool in a leaky condition.

== 27 December ==
List of shipwrecks: 27 December 1840
Ship	State	Description
Charleston	United States	The ship ran aground at New Orleans, Louisiana.
Hesperus	United Kingdom	The ship struck a rock and was beached at Barrington, Nova Scotia, British North America.
Margaret	United Kingdom	The ship was driven ashore near Catania, Sicily. She was on a voyage from Smyrna, Ottoman Empire to an English port.
Octarara	United States	The ship was driven ashore at New Orleans. She was on a voyage from Liverpool, Lancashire, United Kingdom to New Orleans.

== 28 December ==
List of shipwrecks: 28 December 1840
Ship	State	Description
Adolphine	France	The ship was wrecked near Cartagena, Spain. She was on a voyage from Trieste to Havre de Grâce, Seine-Inférieure.
England	United States	The full-rigged ship was severely damaged by fire at Liverpool, Lancashire, United Kingdom.
Hannontia	Brazil	The ship was wrecked off Pará. Her crew were rescued.
Pladda	United Kingdom	The ship was driven ashore at Batten Point, Devon. She was on a voyage from Cardiff, Glamorgan to Plymouth, Devon. Pladda was refloated the next day.
Osprey	United Kingdom	The ship ran aground on the Burbo Bank, in Liverpool Bay. She was on a voyage from Liverpool to Bombay, India. Osprey was refloated.

== 29 December ==
List of shipwrecks: 29 December 1840
Ship	State	Description
Australia	United Kingdom	The brig was destroyed by fire in the Atlantic Ocean 600 nautical miles (1,100 km) west of the Cape of Good Hope with the loss of two of the 28 people on board. She was on a voyage from Leith, Lothian to Port Phillip, South Australia.
Cygnet	United Kingdom	The ship was wrecked on Isabella Point, Haiti.
Penzance Packet	United Kingdom	The ship was abandoned in the Atlantic Ocean 20 nautical miles (37 km) east south east of the Isles of Scilly. Her crew were rescued by Ganges (United Kingdom). Penzance Packet was on a voyage from Cork to London.
Veritas	United Kingdom	The schooner was damaged by fire at Saint Sampson, Guernsey, Channel Islands with the loss of a crew member.
William Sennington	United Kingdom	The steam tug foundered in the North Sea. Her crew were rescued by the schooner Mary ( (United Kingdom of Great Britain and Ireland) Jersey). William Sennington was on a voyage from Hull, Yorkshire to London.

== 30 December ==
List of shipwrecks: 30 December 1840
Ship	State	Description
Gleaner	United Kingdom	The sloop was driven ashore at Rhyl, Flintshire.
Johannes	Kingdom of Hanover	The ship was driven onto the Roper Sand, in the Ems. She was on a voyage from Hull, Yorkshire, United Kingdom to Leer.
Plawsworth	United Kingdom	The brig was driven ashore and wrecked 4 nautical miles (7.4 km) east of Wells-next-the-Sea, Norfolk.
Robert and James	United Kingdom	The brig was abandoned in the North Sea 10 nautical miles (19 km) north of Cromer, Norfolk. Her crew were rescued by Gazelle (United Kingdom). Robert and James was on a voyage from South Shields, County Durham to London. She was taken in tow by Gazelle and arrived at Hull, Yorkshire.
Seostris	United Kingdom	The ship was driven ashore in Macrihanish Bay with the loss of a crew member. She was on a voyage from Pictou, Nova Scotia, British North America to the Clyde.

== 31 December ==
List of shipwrecks: 31 December 1840
Ship	State	Description
Active	United Kingdom	The ship foundered on the Cross Sand, in the North Sea off the coast of Norfolk, having previously been abandoned by her crew.
Druid	United Kingdom	The ship was in collision with a brig and foundered in the North Sea Orfordness, Suffolk. Her crew were rescued by William Thompson (United Kingdom). Druid was on a voyage from Hartlepool, County Durham to London.
Eleanor	Hamburg	The schooner was run down and sunk in the English Channel off the Isle of Wight by Prince Albert (United Kingdom).
Eliza	United Kingdom	The ship was driven ashore at Peterhead, Aberdeenshire. She was on a voyage from Newcastle upon Tyne, Northumberland to Inverness. Eliza was refloated and taken into Peterhead.
Johan Gerhard Amela	Hamburg	The ship was wrecked 3 nautical miles (5.6 km) off Cuxhaven. She was on a voyage from Çeşme, Ottoman Empire to Hamburg.
La Mehasia	(Tunisia) Tunisian Navy	The corvette was driven ashore and wrecked at Cape Lardier, Var, France. Her 63 crew were rescued.
Margaret	United Kingdom	The ship departed from Swansea, Glamorgan for Lisbon, Portugal. No further trace presumed foundered with the loss of all hands.
Mariner	United Kingdom	The schooner was driven ashore in Abergele Bay.
Odessa	United Kingdom	The ship was abandoned on the Haisborough Sands, in the North Sea off the coast of Norfolk.
Olive	United Kingdom	The ship ran aground on the Kentish Knock. She was on a voyage from London to Dundee, Forfarshire. Olive was refloated.

== Unknown date ==
List of shipwrecks: Unknown date in December 1840
Ship	State	Description
Alexander	Bremen	The ship was wrecked on Isabella Point, Haiti before 29 December. Over 170 people were rescued. She was on a voyage from Bremen to New Orleans, Louisiana, United States.
Athenæus	France	The ship was driven ashore at Gibraltar between 26 and 28 December. She was on a voyage from Cette, Hérault to Nantes, Loire-Inférieure. She was later refloated.
Brilliant	United Kingdom	Brilliant, of Shields, foundered in the North Sea before 22 December.
Caroline	United Kingdom	The ship was driven ashore at Gibraltar between 26 and 28 December. She was on a voyage from Gallipoli, Ottoman Empire to Falmouth, Cornwall. She was later refloated.
Chepstow	United Kingdom	The ship was driven ashore near Lymington, Hampshire. She was refloated on 7 December and taken into Lymington.
Colonist	United Kingdom	The ship was driven ashore on Saint Kitts before 17 December.
Devoron	United Kingdom	The ship was abandoned in the Atlantic Ocean. Her crew were rescued by Agnes (United Kingdom);. Devoron was on a voyage from Dalhousie, New Brunswick, British North America to Greenock, Renfrewshire
Esperance, or Hesperia	United Kingdom	The ship was lost near Christiansand, Norway. Three of her crew were rescued by Whitby (United Kingdom).
Garrick	United Kingdom	The ship was wrecked on the east coast of the United States. All on board were rescued.
Henriette	Danzig	The ship was driven ashore at Danzig. She was refloated on 7 December.
Jane	(United Kingdom of Great Britain and Ireland) New Zealand	The cutter grounded herself 15 miles southeast of Wanganui, New Zealand, during mid-December with no crew on board. It was thought the ship capsized, drowning her crew of four and one passenger, before righting herself. Several bodies were recovered from the Wanganui coast.
Lady Rolle	United Kingdom	The ship was driven ashore at Pendennis Castle, Cornwall. She was on a voyage from a Welsh port to Falmouth, Cornwall. Lady Rolle was refloated on 14 December and beached.
Maria	United Kingdom	The ship was driven ashore on Kicker Point. She was on a voyage from King's Lynn, Norfolk to Ramsgate, Kent. Maria had been refloated by 25 December.
Mary Walker	United Kingdom	The ship was abandoned in the Atlantic Ocean. She was on a voyage from Demerara, British Honduras to the Clyde.
Nocton	United Kingdom	The whaler was reported to have foundered in the Pacific Ocean off Ocean Island, Gilbert Islands. Her crew were reported to have been rescued by Louisa (United Kingdom). It was also reported that she arrived at Sydney, New South Wales on 21 January 1841 in a leaky condition.
Orion	United Kingdom	The ship was driven ashore at "Skarfoarne". She was on a voyage from Kaskinen, Grand Duchy of Finland to London.
Oslee	Russia	The ship was abandoned before 9 December. Her crew were rescued by Lady Raffles (United Kingdom). Oslee was on a voyage from Odesa to Falmouth, Cornwall.
Oude en Hoop	Netherlands	The ship was abandoned in the North Sea. She was on a voyage from Stettin to Guernsey, Channel Islands.
Pleiades	United Kingdom	The ship was abandoned in the Atlantic Ocean on or before 2 December. Her crew were rescued by Ninian (United Kingdom).
Quentin Leach	United Kingdom	The ship was abandoned in the Atlantic Ocean before 27 December.
Sarah	United Kingdom	The ship was wrecked on "Snoddy Head", British North America.
Snowden	United Kingdom	The ship foundered in the North Sea before 22 December.
Spey	United Kingdom	The ship was lost in the Bahama Channel. All on board were rescued. She was on a voyage from Falmouth, Cornwall to a port in Mexico.
Vernon	United Kingdom	The ship was driven ashore in the Water of Urr. She was on a voyage from Liverpool to Glasgow, Renfrewshire. Vernon was refloated on 6 December and taken into Carsethorn, Dumfriesshire.
Warberg	Sweden	The ship was driven ashore at Trelleborg. She was on a voyage from Newcastle upon Tyne to Stockholm.
