= Thomas Bergin =

Thomas Bergin may refer to:

- Thomas G. Bergin (1904–1987), American scholar of Italian literature
- Thomas Fleming Bergin (died 1862), Irish civil engineer and railway official

== See also ==
- Tom Bergin's, a restaurant/bar in Los Angeles, California, United States
