= Harry P. Deuel =

American businessman (1836–1914)

Harry Porter Deuel (December 11, 1836 – November 23, 1914) was a prominent railroad man in Omaha, Nebraska. Over the course of his career Deuel was employed throughout the transportation sector in Omaha, working for the foremost Missouri River shipping company in Omaha during its early years. Later he worked for the Union Pacific and the Chicago, Burlington and Quincy railroads, among others. He is the namesake of Deuel County, Nebraska. When he resigned from his last railroad job to become the Douglas County Registrar of Deeds, Deuel was the oldest railroad man in continuous service in Omaha, and was said to be one of the best known passenger men in the Western United States.

== Biography ==
Born in Clarkson, New York to Charles P. and Lucy H. (Porter) Deuel, young Harry's family moved to Farmington, Illinois, when he was a year old. His father, originally a cooper, became a farmer and sent his kids to public schools in the area. When he graduated from school Harry P. Deuel went to Lombard University in Galesburg, Illinois. He worked on the family farm until November 1859 when he moved to Omaha, Nebraska, to work with his uncle, Judge John R. Porter, to run the Porter and Deuel Steamboat Agency, Forwarding and Commission Company.

Deuel eventually became the agent for the Kansas City, St. Joseph, & Council Bluffs Railroad. After that he was an agent for the Burlington and Missouri River Railroad until 1888, when he resigned to become the Omaha passenger agent for the Union Pacific Railroad. In 1896 he became superintendent of the new Burlington Station in Omaha, a position he held until 1901.

In 1901 Deuel was elected registrar of deeds.

== Community involvement ==
Deuel was well known throughout Omaha social circles, and was prominent in Masonic work for more than 50 years, including serving as first Right Eminent Grand Commander elect, and as the Grand Master of the Nebraska Grand Lodge in 1869. He was the thirty-third degree Scottish Rite, the Ancient Arabic Order, Nobles of the Mystic Shrine. He also belonged to the Elks and other orders.

== See also ==
- History of Omaha
- Founding figures of Omaha, Nebraska
