= Deuel County, Nebraska =

County in Nebraska, United States

- County
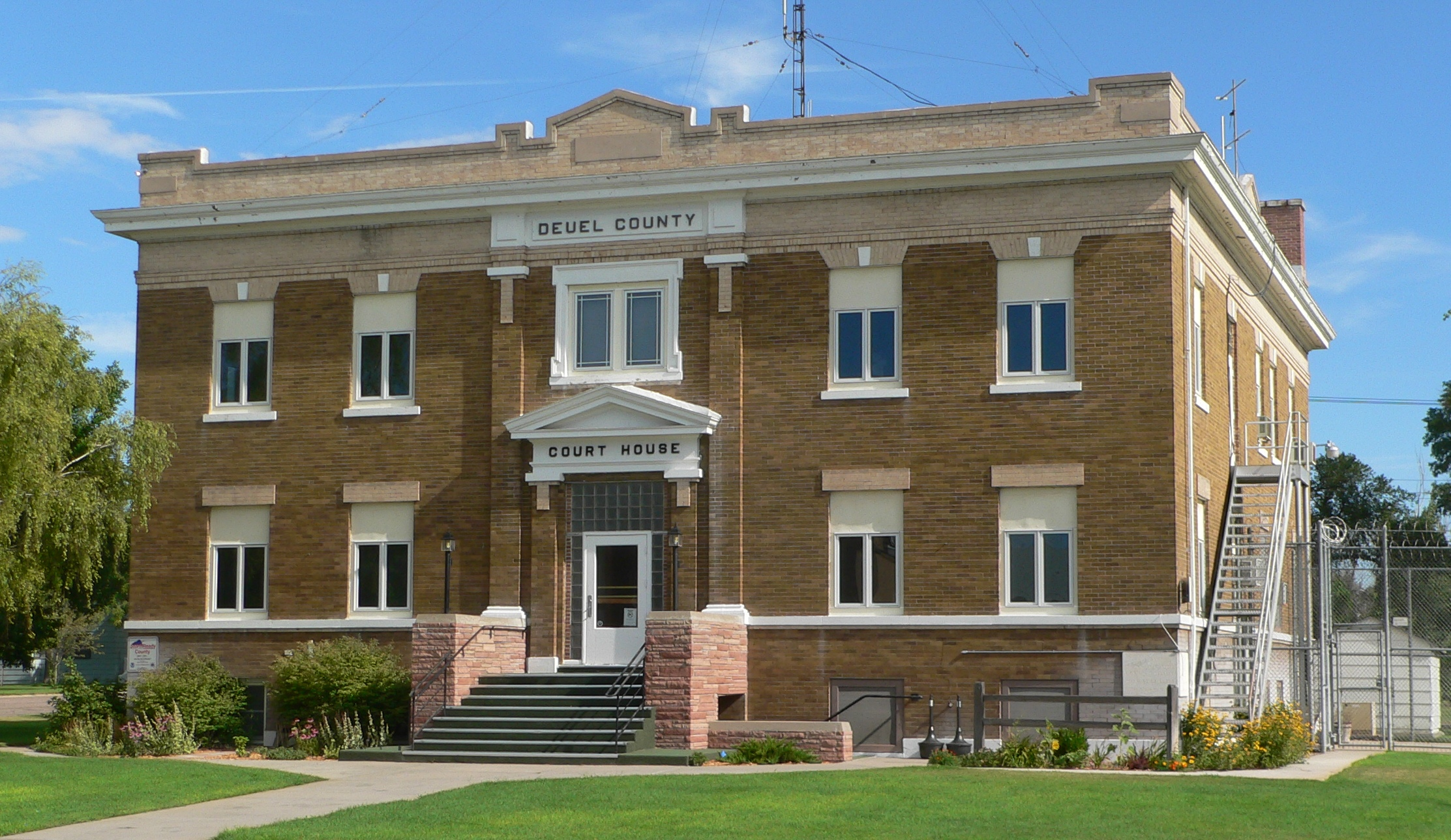
- Deuel County Courthouse in Chappell

- Location within the U.S. state of Nebraska
- Coordinates: 41°07′N 102°20′W
- Country: United States
- State: Nebraska
- Founded: 1889
- Named for: Harry P. Deuel
- Seat: Chappell
- Largest city: Chappell

Area
  - Total: 441 sq mi (1,140 km^{2})
  - Land: 440 sq mi (1,100 km^{2})
  - Water: 0.9 sq mi (2.3 km^{2}) 0.2%

Population (2020)
  - Total: 1,838
  - Estimate (2025): 1,862 ▲
  - Density: 4.2/sq mi (1.6/km^{2})
- Time zone: UTC−7 (Mountain)
  - Summer (DST): UTC−6 (MDT)
- Congressional district: 3rd
- Website: deuelcountyne.gov

Deuel County (/ˈduːəl/) is a county located in the U.S. State of Nebraska. As of the 2020 United States census, the population was 1,838. Its county seat is Chappell. The county was formed in 1889 and named for Harry Porter Deuel, superintendent of the Union Pacific Railroad.

In the Nebraska license plate system, Deuel County is represented by the prefix 78 (it had the 78th-largest number of vehicles registered in the county when the license plate system was established in 1922).

== Geography ==
Deuel County lies on the south side of Nebraska. Its southern boundary abuts the northern boundary line of the State of Colorado. According to the US Census Bureau, the county has an area of 411 square miles (1,060 km^{2}), of which 440 square miles (1,100 km^{2}) is land and 0.9 square miles (2.3 km^{2}) (0.2%) is water.

Since Deuel County lies in the western portion of Nebraska, its residents observe Mountain Time. The eastern portion of Nebraska observes Central Time.

=== Major highways ===
- Interstate 80
- Interstate 76
- U.S. Highway 30
- U.S. Highway 138
- U.S. Highway 385
- Nebraska Highway 27

=== Adjacent counties ===
- Garden County - north
- Keith County - east
- Perkins County - southeast
- Sedgwick County, Colorado - south
- Cheyenne County - west

== Demographics ==
Historical population
Census	Pop.	Note	%±
1890	2,893		—
1900	2,630		−9.1%
1910	1,786		−32.1%
1920	3,282		83.8%
1930	3,992		21.6%
1940	3,580		−10.3%
1950	3,330		−7.0%
1960	3,125		−6.2%
1970	2,717		−13.1%
1980	2,462		−9.4%
1990	2,237		−9.1%
2000	2,098		−6.2%
2010	1,941		−7.5%
2020	1,838		−5.3%
2025 (est.)	1,862	▲	1.3%
US Decennial Census; 1790-1960 1900-1990; 1990-2000 2010 2020 2022

=== 2020 census ===
As of the 2020 census, the county had a population of 1,838. The median age was 49.9 years. 21.4% of residents were under the age of 18 and 25.6% of residents were 65 years of age or older. For every 100 females there were 102.6 males, and for every 100 females age 18 and over there were 106.6 males age 18 and over.

The racial makeup of the county was 93.0% White, 0.1% Black or African American, 0.7% American Indian and Alaska Native, 0.3% Asian, 0.0% Native Hawaiian and Pacific Islander, 1.8% from some other race, and 4.1% from two or more races. Hispanic or Latino residents of any race comprised 5.4% of the population.

0.0% of residents lived in urban areas, while 100.0% lived in rural areas.

There were 834 households in the county, of which 26.0% had children under the age of 18 living with them and 20.5% had a female householder with no spouse or partner present. About 33.6% of all households were made up of individuals and 17.0% had someone living alone who was 65 years of age or older.

There were 1,048 housing units, of which 20.4% were vacant. Among occupied housing units, 75.8% were owner-occupied and 24.2% were renter-occupied. The homeowner vacancy rate was 5.0% and the rental vacancy rate was 14.4%.

=== 2000 census ===
As of the 2000 United States census, there were 2,098 people, 908 households, and 601 families in the county. The population density was 5 people per square mile (1.9 people/km^{2}). There were 1,032 housing units at an average density of 2 units per square mile (0.77/km^{2}). The racial makeup of the county was 97.33% White, 0.05% Black or African American, 0.38% Native American, 0.38% Asian, 1.14% from other races, and 0.71% from two or more races. 2.72% of the population were Hispanic or Latino of any race. 36.3% were of German, 10.7% Irish, 10.2% English, 10.0% Swedish and 9.5% American ancestry.

There were 908 households, out of which 25.60% had children under the age of 18 living with them, 57.60% were married couples living together, 5.90% had a female householder with no husband present, and 33.80% were non-families. 31.20% of all households were made up of individuals, and 16.50% had someone living alone who was 65 years of age or older. The average household size was 2.29 and the average family size was 2.87.

The county population contained 23.30% under the age of 18, 4.90% from 18 to 24, 24.40% from 25 to 44, 24.50% from 45 to 64, and 22.90% who were 65 years of age or older. For every 100 females there were 94.80 males. For every 100 females age 18 and over, there were 95.50 males.

The median income for a household in the county was $32,981, and the median income for a family was $41,550. Males had a median income of $26,020 versus $19,479 for females. The per capita income for the county was $17,891. About 5.30% of families and 9.10% of the population were below the poverty line, including 12.40% of those under age 18 and 6.10% of those age 65 or over.

== Communities ==
=== City ===
- Chappell (county seat)

=== Village ===
- Big Springs

=== Unincorporated community ===
- Barton

== Politics ==
Deuel County voters have been strongly Republican for decades. In no national election since 1936 has the county selected the Democratic Party candidate (as of 2024).

United States presidential election results for Deuel County, Nebraska
Year	Republican		Democratic		Third party(ies)	
Year	No.	%	No.	%	No.	%
1900	403	61.34%	241	36.68%	13	1.98%
1904	399	72.15%	109	19.71%	45	8.14%
1908	526	56.08%	392	41.79%	20	2.13%
1912	64	16.75%	135	35.34%	183	47.91%
1916	181	33.27%	340	62.50%	23	4.23%
1920	684	64.83%	321	30.43%	50	4.74%
1924	775	58.23%	316	23.74%	240	18.03%
1928	1,197	74.39%	403	25.05%	9	0.56%
1932	630	35.69%	1,093	61.93%	42	2.38%
1936	747	41.32%	1,020	56.42%	41	2.27%
1940	1,156	67.17%	565	32.83%	0	0.00%
1944	1,125	73.48%	406	26.52%	0	0.00%
1948	1,043	71.68%	412	28.32%	0	0.00%
1952	1,372	85.06%	241	14.94%	0	0.00%
1956	1,165	79.85%	294	20.15%	0	0.00%
1960	1,276	76.22%	398	23.78%	0	0.00%
1964	972	64.58%	533	35.42%	0	0.00%
1968	997	75.25%	250	18.87%	78	5.89%
1972	1,001	81.71%	224	18.29%	0	0.00%
1976	776	65.16%	398	33.42%	17	1.43%
1980	946	77.54%	192	15.74%	82	6.72%
1984	962	82.43%	198	16.97%	7	0.60%
1988	769	71.20%	302	27.96%	9	0.83%
1992	558	49.82%	232	20.71%	330	29.46%
1996	629	63.47%	245	24.72%	117	11.81%
2000	783	75.80%	213	20.62%	37	3.58%
2004	820	77.87%	222	21.08%	11	1.04%
2008	732	73.72%	243	24.47%	18	1.81%
2012	763	75.02%	215	21.14%	39	3.83%
2016	809	82.22%	120	12.20%	55	5.59%
2020	871	84.24%	141	13.64%	22	2.13%
2024	843	83.14%	151	14.89%	20	1.97%

== See also ==
- National Register of Historic Places listings in Deuel County, Nebraska
