= Bergin =

Bergin is a surname. Notable people with the surname include:

- James Bergin (1845–1880), Irish recipient of the Victoria Cross
- John Daniel Bergin, New Zealand neurologist
- Mary Bergin, Irish folk musician
- Michael Bergin, American model
- Osborn Bergin, Irish Celticist
- Patricia Bergin, Australian judge
- Patrick Bergin, Irish actor
- Thomas Bergin, scholar translator
- Thomas Fleming Bergin, Early railway engineer and manager
- Eily Bergin, character in the Northern Irish film Breakfast on Pluto (2005) and the novel of the same name from which it is based

== See also ==
- Diane Bergin, Consultant Radiologist, Professor of Radiology, Galway, Ireland.
- Tom Bergin's, a tavern in Los Angeles, California
- Bergin & Garvey, a publisher later subsumed by Greenwood Publishing
