= USS Barton =

Two ships of the United States Navy have been named Barton in honor of Rear Admiral John Kennedy Barton.

- USS Barton (DD-599), was a Benson-class destroyer launched in 1942 that was sunk by enemy action on 13 November 1942.
- USS Barton (DD-722), was a Allen M. Sumner-class destroyer launched in 1943 that served until 1968.
