= HMS Bold (1812) =

Brig of the Royal Navy

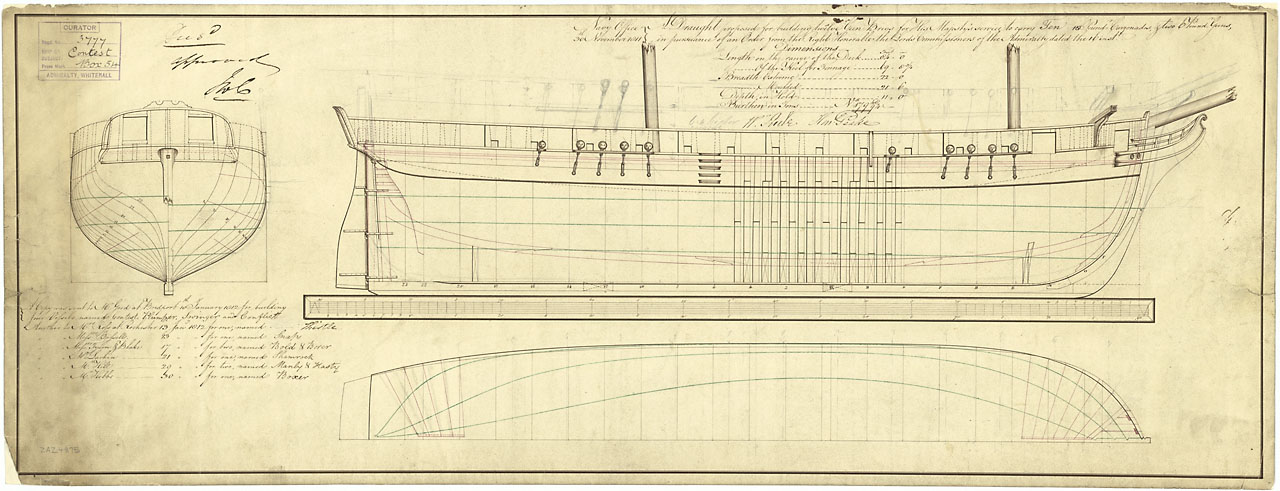
- Bold

History

United Kingdom
- Name: HMS Bold
- Ordered: 16 November 1811
- Builder: Tyson & Blake, Bursledon
- Launched: 26 June 1812
- Commissioned: July 1812
- Fate: Wrecked on 27 September 1813

General characteristics
- Class & type: Bold-class gun-brig
- Tons burthen: 18235/94 (bm)
- Length: 84 ft 4 in (25.7 m) (overall); 70 ft 0 1/2 in (21.3 m) (keel)
- Beam: 22 ft 1 1/2 in (6.7 m)
- Depth of hold: 11 ft 1 in (3.4 m)
- Sail plan: Brig
- Complement: 60
- Armament: 10 × 18-pounder carronades + 2 × 6-pounder bow chasers

HMS Bold was a 14-gun Bold-class gun-brig built by Tyson & Blake at Bursledon. She was launched in 1812 and wrecked off Prince Edward Island on 27 September 1813.

== Design and construction ==
The Bold class were a revival of Sir William Rule's Confounder-class gun-brig design of 1804. They were armed with ten 18-pounder carronades and two 6-pounder bow chasers. Built at Bursledon by Tyson & Blake, Bold was launched on 26 June 1812 and commissioned in July 1812 under Commander John Skekel, who sailed for North America in her on 17 April 1813. (Note: For more on Commander John Skekel see: O'Byrne, William R. (1849). "Skekel, John" . A Naval Biographical Dictionary. London: John Murray.)

== Service ==
On 18 or 26 May 1813 (records differ), while in the company of the Halifax privateer Sir John Sherbrooke, the two vessels recaptured Duck, which the American privateer General Plummer had taken shortly before. Duck had been traveling from Waterford to Newfoundland.

== Fate ==
On the morning of 27 September 1813, Bold grounded on the north end of Prince Edward Island between 3 and 4am. Some accounts emphasize that this occurred during a strong NE gale. However the court martial account does not mention this. Despite efforts to lighten her, Bold remained stuck and ultimately had to be abandoned. In the morning it was clear that she was a cable-length (i.e., a little more than an eight of a mile) from shore. The crew established a line to the shore through the surf and this enabled a boat to go back and forth between vessel and shore. The result was that her entire crew of 67 officers and men were saved.

A small party went overland to Charlottetown to seek help while the remainder of the crew attempted to salvage what it could. Lieutenant Governor C. D. Smith sent the transport Agnes, which had recently arrived at Charlottetown, with ordnance stores for the garrison, to assist Bold and recover stores. (Note: The Naval Chronicle gives the name of Bold's captain as Sackwell, but this is incorrect.) Agnes took Bold's crew to Halifax.

The subsequent court martial reprimanded Skekel and the master for having neglected to instruct the watch to take frequent depth soundings. It also fined the local pilot for not having warned Skekel about the currents in the area. John Skekel went on to another command and in time became an admiral.
