= Brilliant (1812 ship) =

United Kingdom
- Name: Brilliant
- Acquired: 1812
- Fate: Foundered December 1840

General characteristics
- Tons burthen: 195, or 196, or 198 (bm)
- Armament: 6 × 6-pounder guns
- Notes: Built of oak and fir

Brilliant was launched in Sweden in 1804, probably under another name, and take in prize circa 1812. She became a British merchantman. In 1813 two French frigates captured her, but then abandoned her. She continued to trade widely until she became a coaster sailing between London and Newcastle. She foundered in December 1840.

== Career ==
Brilliant first appeared in the supplementary pages in Lloyd's Register (LR) in 1812.

Year	Master	Owner	Trade	Source & notes
1812	Davenport	Mawman.	London–Gibraltar	LR
1814	Davenport; Colson	Mawman.	London–Lisbon	LR

In December 1814 Lloyd's List reported that the frigate HMS Hyperion had found Brilliant, Davenport, master, which had been sailing from Maranham to Liverpool, abandoned at sea with her masts and sails alongside.

Between 5 and 22 December 1813, the French frigates Circé, capitaine de vaisseau Collinet, and Pallas, capitaine de vaisseau Caillabet, captured 10 British merchantmen. The French burnt eight, that is, all but Brilliant, Davenport, master, and Duck, Silly, master. They removed Brilliant's crew and abandoned her at sea; Hyperion brought her into Plymouth. The French put all their prisoners on Duck and released her. She arrived at the Isle of Scilly on 4 January 1814.

Year	Master	Owner	Trade	Source & notes
1816	Colson	Mawman.	London–"Const."	LR
1818	Colson	Mawman.	Liverpool–Brazils; London–St Lucie	LR; thorough repair 1817
1819	Colson; Clark	Mawman	London–Berbice	LR; thorough repair 1817
1824	Clark; Major	Mawman	London–Seville	LR; thorough repair 1817
1833	T.Major	Mawman	London–St Lucie	LR; thorough repair 1825
1834	A.Hopton; Youens	Wooster	London–Newcastle	LR; lengthened
1839	Robinson	Aisbit & Co.	London–Newcastle	LR; lengthened, & large repair 1837
1840	Robinson	Aisbit & Co.	London–Newcastle	LR; lengthened, & large repair 1837

After her ownership changed from Wooster to Aisbit, Brilliant's homeport became Shields.

== Fate ==
Brilliant was wrecked in December 1840. A report from Filey, dated 22 December 1840, stated that the stern of a vessel had been found with "Brilliant of Shields" painted on it. Her entry in LR for 1840 bore the annotation "wrecked".
