= Penrhyn Castle (1807 ship) =

United Kingdom
- Name: Penrhyn Castle
- Namesake: Penrhyn Castle
- Launched: 1807
- Fate: Wrecked 4 September 1823.

General characteristics
- Tons burthen: 122, or 129 (bm)
- Sail plan: Snow

Penrhyn Castle was launched in 1807 in Bangor. She sailed to the Baltic and three times suffered survivable maritime mishaps. She was finally wrecked on 4 September 1823.

== Career ==
Penrhyn Castle first appeared in the supplementary pages in Lloyd's Register (LR) in 1808.

Year	Master	Owner	Trade	Source & notes
1808	O.Griffith	Capt. & Co.	Dublin–Bangor	LR
1816	Griffith; J.Laird	Capt. & Co.	Plymouth coaster	LR; almost rebuilt 1815

On 7 April 1816 the snow Penrhyn Castle, Griffith, master, came in to Cowes having lost her mast and having sustained other damage.

Penrhyn Castle, Laird, master, was driven ashore 30 November 1816 on Birker Island, Russia. She was on a voyage from London to Pillau, Prussia. Most of her cargo was saved. She had sustained little damage. She was refloated on 19 December and taken in to Pillau.

A strong gale drove Penrhyn Castle, Nutting, master, ashore on 31 October 1817 some 20 miles from Strömstad, Sweden. Once again, she had sustained little damage and it was expected that she would be gotten off once she had been lightened. She was on a voyage from London to Pillau, Prussia.

Year	Master	Owner	Trade	Source & notes
1818	J.Laird; J.Walker	J.Wyatt; P.Walker	London–"Elbng"	LR; almost rebuilt 1815
1823	J.Walker	Ainstie & Co.	Liverpool–Newfoundland; London–Halifax	LR; almost rebuilt 1815

== Fate ==
Penrhyn Castle was wrecked on 4 September 1823 on the coast of Newfoundland while sailing from Quebec City to Halifax, Nova Scotia. Duck took her cargo, soldiers' clothing, from Newfoundland to Quebec.
