= Barton, Newfoundland and Labrador =

Barton
- Location of Barton in Newfoundland
- Coordinates: 48°13′18″N 53°53′56″W
- Country: Canada
- Province: Newfoundland and Labrador
- Time zone: UTC-3:30 (Newfoundland Time)
  - Summer (DST): UTC-2:30 (Newfoundland Daylight)

Barton is a small locality in Newfoundland and Labrador located northeast of Clarenville.

== See also ==
- List of communities in Newfoundland and Labrador
