= John Kennedy Barton =

American Navy admiral (1853–1921)

John K. Barton
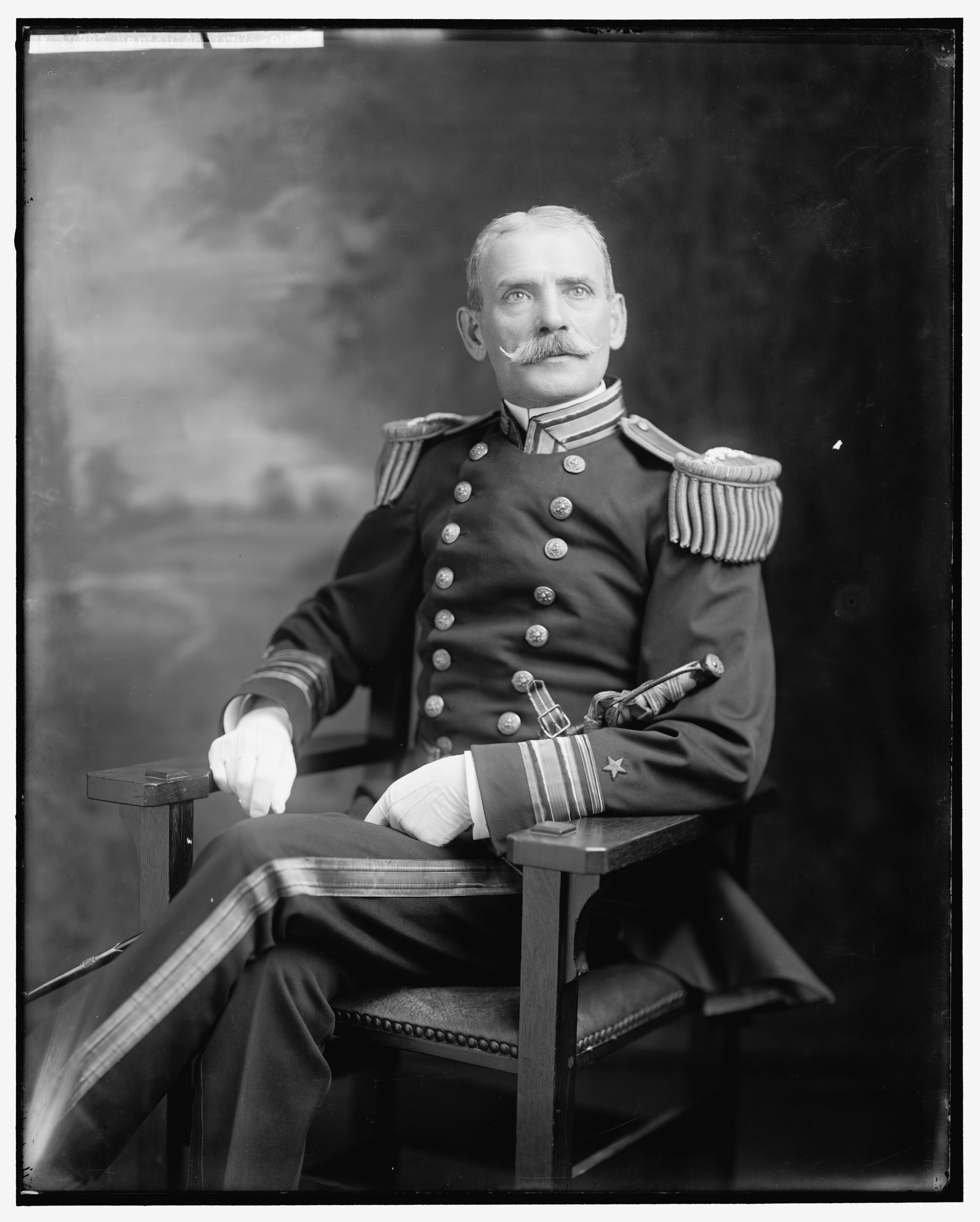

Chief of the Bureau of Steam Engineering
- In office December 21–23, 1908
- Preceded by: Charles Whiteside Rae
- Succeeded by: Hutch Ingham Cone

Personal details
- Born: John Kennedy Barton; April 7, 1853 Philadelphia, Pennsylvania, U.S.
- Died: December 23, 1921 (aged 68) League Island, Pennsylvania, U.S.

Military service
- Allegiance: United States of America
- Branch: United States Navy
- Years of service: 1871–1908
- Rank: Rear Admiral

John Kennedy Barton (April 7, 1853 – December 23, 1921) was a rear admiral in the United States Navy.

== Biography ==
Born in Philadelphia, Barton graduated from the United States Naval Academy in 1873 after completing two years of training as an engineering officer. He alternated tours of duty afloat and ashore through the 1880s, serving in such ships as Benicia, Saranac, Marion, and Shenandoah, before teaching steam engineering at the Naval Academy from 1882 to 1886. Barton then served three years on the Asiatic Station, on Essex and Palos, before returning to the Naval Academy for another tour of duty as instructor (1889–1893).

After supervising the fitting out of the gunboat Castine and cruiser Columbia, Barton became a chief engineer on January 15, 1895. He served in the Pacific Fleet on Mohican and Bennington until detached to shore duty in 1897. Barton returned to the Asiatic Station in 1900 and served on the cruiser Newark and the battleship Kentucky before becoming fleet engineer in 1903. Relieved shortly afterward, he again taught at the Naval Academy until 1905 and then did graduate work in engineering.

In 1907, Barton became head of the department of steam engineering at the Philadelphia Navy Yard. On December 21, 1908, he assumed the title of engineer-in-chief as chief of the Bureau of Steam Engineering with the rank of rear admiral. Only two days later, Barton was detached to return home due to illness and was simultaneously transferred to the navy's retired list. He subsequently held a post on a Naval Examining Board in January 1909, and also served in the Civil Service Commission. He died at the Naval Hospital at League Island, Philadelphia, on December 23, 1921.

Two ships have been named USS Barton for him.
