= Barton, Oregon =

Unincorporated community in the state of Oregon, United States

Barton
- Unincorporated community
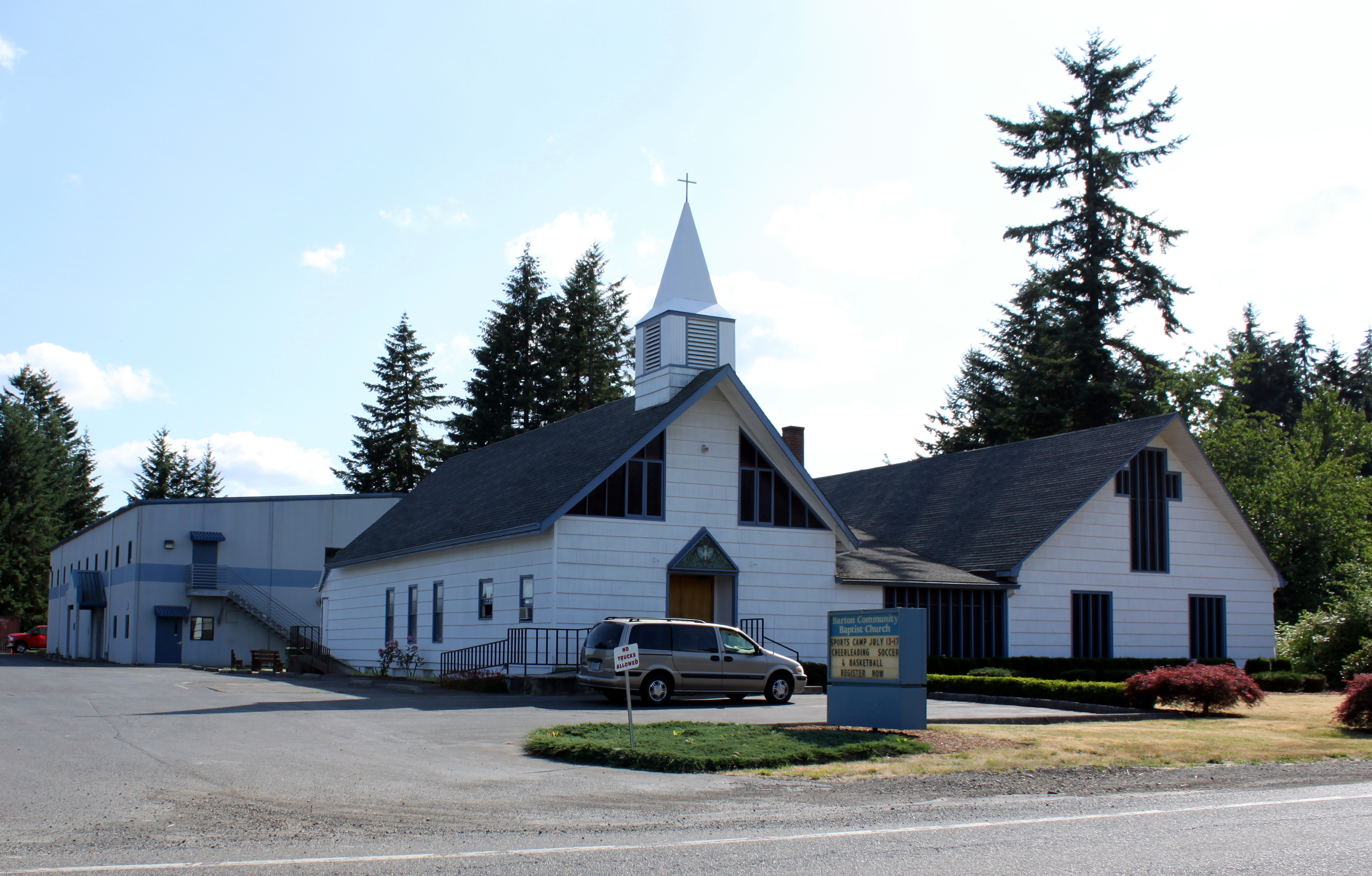
- Baptist church in Barton

- Location within the state of Oregon Barton (the United States)
- Coordinates: 45°23′20″N 122°24′25″W
- Country: United States
- State: Oregon
- County: Clackamas
- Elevation: 266 ft (81 m)
- Time zone: UTC-8 (Pacific (PST))
  - Summer (DST): UTC-7 (PDT)
- GNIS feature ID: 1117276

Barton is an unincorporated community in Clackamas County, Oregon, United States, on Oregon Route 224 near the Clackamas River.

Barton was named after Barton, Wisconsin, by settler E. H. Burghardt. Burghardt started a flour mill and store near the mouth of Deep Creek, and later was postmaster of the Barton post office, which ran from 1896 to 1935.
