= George Frederick Street Berton =

George Frederick Street Berton (December 10, 1808 – January 31, 1840) was a lawyer from Burton Parish in Sunbury County, New Brunswick.

Berton began his brief legal career in a province where his family and a close circle of friends dominated the profession. As an example, one grandfather, Samuel Denny Street, was the province's first lawyer. Another relative, George Duncan Ludlow, was the province's first chief justice. Three uncles were lawyers. They were George Frederick Street, John Ambrose Street and Alfred Locke Street.

Berton is recognized as having led the legal profession in New Brunswick through a period of rapid advancement toward becoming a fully professional body. He did this largely by his efforts in the area of statute consolidation coupled with the development and publishing of law reports.
