= Barton, Nebraska =

Unincorporated community in Nebraska, United States

- Unincorporated Community
- Location within Nebraska Location within the United States
- Coordinates: 41°N 102.2°W
- Country: United States
- State: Nebraska
- County: Deuel

Barton is an unincorporated community in Deuel County, Nebraska, United States. It is located west of Big Springs, along the South Platte River, halfway to the Colorado border.

== History ==
Barton was named for a local resident, Guy C. Barton of North Platte.
