= Duck (1812 ship) =

United States
- Builder: Boston
- Launched: 1804
- Fate: Captured 1812

United Kingdom
- Name: Duck
- Acquired: 1812
- Fate: Wrecked 15 October 1829

General characteristics
- Tons burthen: 181 (bm)

Duck was launched in Boston in 1804, presumably under another name. She was taken in prize in 1812 and became a British merchantman. She spent much of her career sailing between Britain and Newfoundland. In 1813, an American privateer captured her, but then a Royal Navy brig recaptured her. At the end of the year, French frigates captured Duck, but released her. She was wrecked on 15 October 1829.

== Career ==
Duck first appeared in Lloyd's Register (LR) in the supplementary pages to the volume for 1812.

Year	Master	Owner	Trade	Source & notes
1812	T.Ford	Newman	Dartmouth–Newfoundland	LR; small repairs 1812
1813	T.Ford; T.Silly (or T.Silley)	Newman	Dartmouth–Newfoundland	LR; small repairs 1812

On 18 or 26 May 1813 (records differ), while in the company of the Halifax privateer Sir John Sherbrooke, HMS Bold recaptured Duck, which the American privateer General Plummer had taken shortly before. Duck, T.Selly, master, had been traveling from Waterford to Newfoundland. Her captors sent Duck into Halifax, Nova Scotia.

Duck had been carrying 40 Irish labourers from Waterford to work in the Newfoundland operations of Newman & Co., a branch of the firm Hunt Roope & Co., which transported salt fish from Newfoundland to Portugal, and then port wine from Portugal to England. Sir John Sherbrooke took the labourers on board. The British frigate Shannon recruited 22 of the labourers. Shannon recruited the men only four days before she met and captured the USS Chesapeake. Only four of the Irishmen could speak English.

To honour the contribution of Newman & CO.'s labourers to the British victory, the Admiralty permitted Newman & Co. to fly the White Ensign at their offices.

Between 5 and 22 December 1813, the French frigates Circé, capitaine de vaisseau Collinet, and Pallas, capitaine de vaisseau Caillabet, captured 10 British merchantmen. The French burnt eight, that is, all but Brilliant, Davenport, master, and Duck, Silly, master. They removed Brilliant's crew and abandoned her at sea; the frigate HMS Hyperion found her floating and brought her into Plymouth. The French put all their prisoners on Duck and released her. She arrived at the Isle of Scilly on 4 January 1814.

Year	Master	Owner	Trade	Source & notes
1820	J.Blacklin; Stanley	Newman & Co.	London–Philadelphia; Liverpool–Newfoundland	LR; small repairs 1812
1822	Nichols	Newman & Co.	Liverpool–Newfoundland	LR; small repairs 1812

Penrhyn Castle was wrecked on 4 September 1823 on the coast of Newfoundland while sailing from Quebec City to Halifax, Nova Scotia. Duck carried Penrhyn Castle's cargo, soldiers' clothing, from Newfoundland to Quebec.

== Fate ==
On 15 October 1829 a gale drove Duck, of London, Meek, master, on shore at Stanton Sands. She was one of several driven onto the beach. A later report stated that the other vessels were expected to be gotten off, but that Duck was breaking up.
