= USS Barton (DD-722) =

Allen M. Sumner-class destroyer

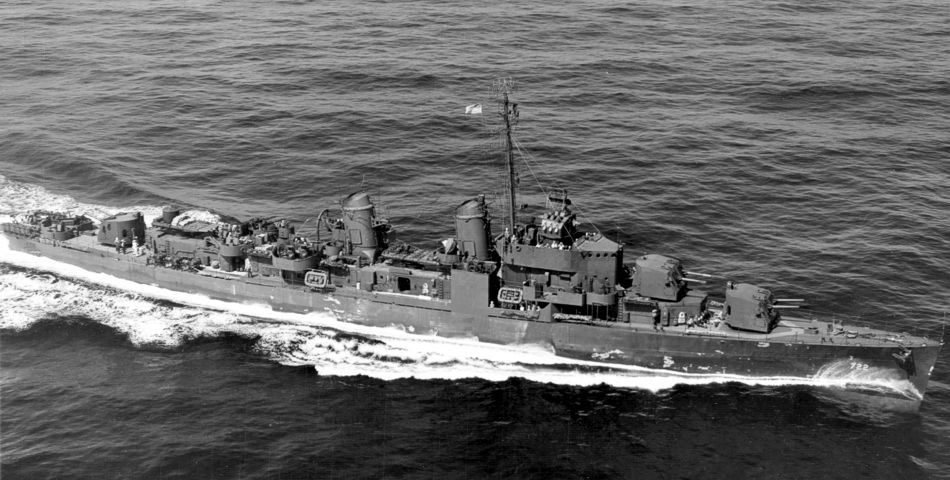
- USS Barton

History

United States
- Name: USS Barton
- Namesake: John Kennedy Barton
- Builder: Bath Iron Works
- Laid down: 24 May 1943
- Launched: 10 October 1943
- Commissioned: 30 December 1943
- Decommissioned: 30 September 1968
- Stricken: 1 October 1968
- Fate: Sunk as target off Virginia, 8 October 1969

General characteristics
- Class & type: Allen M. Sumner-class destroyer
- Displacement: 2,200 long tons (2,235 t)
- Length: 376 ft 6 in (114.76 m)
- Beam: 40 ft (12 m)
- Draft: 15 ft 8 in (4.78 m)
- Installed power: 60,000 shp (45,000 kW)
- Propulsion: 2 × steam turbines; 2 × shafts
- Speed: 34 kn (39 mph; 63 km/h)
- Range: 6,500 nmi (7,500 mi; 12,000 km) at 15 kn (17 mph; 28 km/h)
- Complement: 336
- Sensors & processing systems: Radar
- Armament: 6 × 5 in (130 mm)/38 cal guns; 12 × 40 mm anti-aircraft guns, 11 × 20 mm anti-aircraft cannons, 10 × 21 inch (533 mm) torpedo tubes (2x5), 6 × depth charge projectors, 2 × depth charge tracks

USS Barton (DD-722), an Allen M. Sumner-class destroyer, was the second ship of the United States Navy to be named for Rear Admiral John Kennedy Barton.

== Construction ==
The second Barton (DD-722) was launched on 10 October 1943 by Bath Iron Works Corp., Bath, Maine, sponsored by Ms. Barbara Dean Barton, granddaughter of Admiral Barton. The ship was commissioned on 30 December 1943.

== World War II ==
On 14 May 1944, Barton departed Norfolk and arrived at Plymouth, England on 27 May. From 3-26, June she carried out screening, patrol, and bombardment duties in support of the invasion of Normandy. On 6 June, she rescued 31 American soldiers from the sinking LCT-2498. During a brisk engagement with German batteries in the Bombardment of Cherbourg on 25 June, Barton was slightly damaged while delivering effective gunfire support. Aboard "Barton" during the Normandy operations was actor Robert Montgomery, a Lieutenant Commander, intelligence officer, and Assistant Naval Attache in London.

Returning to the U.S. on 10 July, Barton soon departed Norfolk for the Pacific, arriving at Pearl Harbor on 2 October. She then steamed westward to take part in the capture of Leyte, including the Ormoc landings (9 November – 8 December), Mindoro landings (12–18 December), Lingayen Gulf landings (4–21 January 1945); Iwo Jima invasion, including the 5th Fleet's supporting raids on Honshū and the Nansei Shoto (10–19 February, 25 February – 1 March); joined Task Force 54 (TF 54) for the invasion of Okinawa (21 March – 30 June), and the 3rd Fleet raids on Japan (10–24 July).

== After the war ==
After a brief tour with the occupation forces in Japan, Barton returned to Seattle on 6 October. She operated along the west coast until June 1946, when she departed Oakland for Bikini Atoll, where she participated in Operation Crossroads (15 June – 10 August). Returning to the United States, she continued operations off the west coast until 22 January 1947, when she went out of commission in reserve at San Diego.

On 11 April 1949, Barton was recommissioned and joined Destroyer Division 201 (DesDiv 201). She operated with the Pacific Fleet until 11 July, when she got underway for Norfolk, arriving on 5 August. For the next three years, she operated along the eastern seaboard, made two cruises to the Caribbean, and one cruise with the 6th Fleet in the Mediterranean.

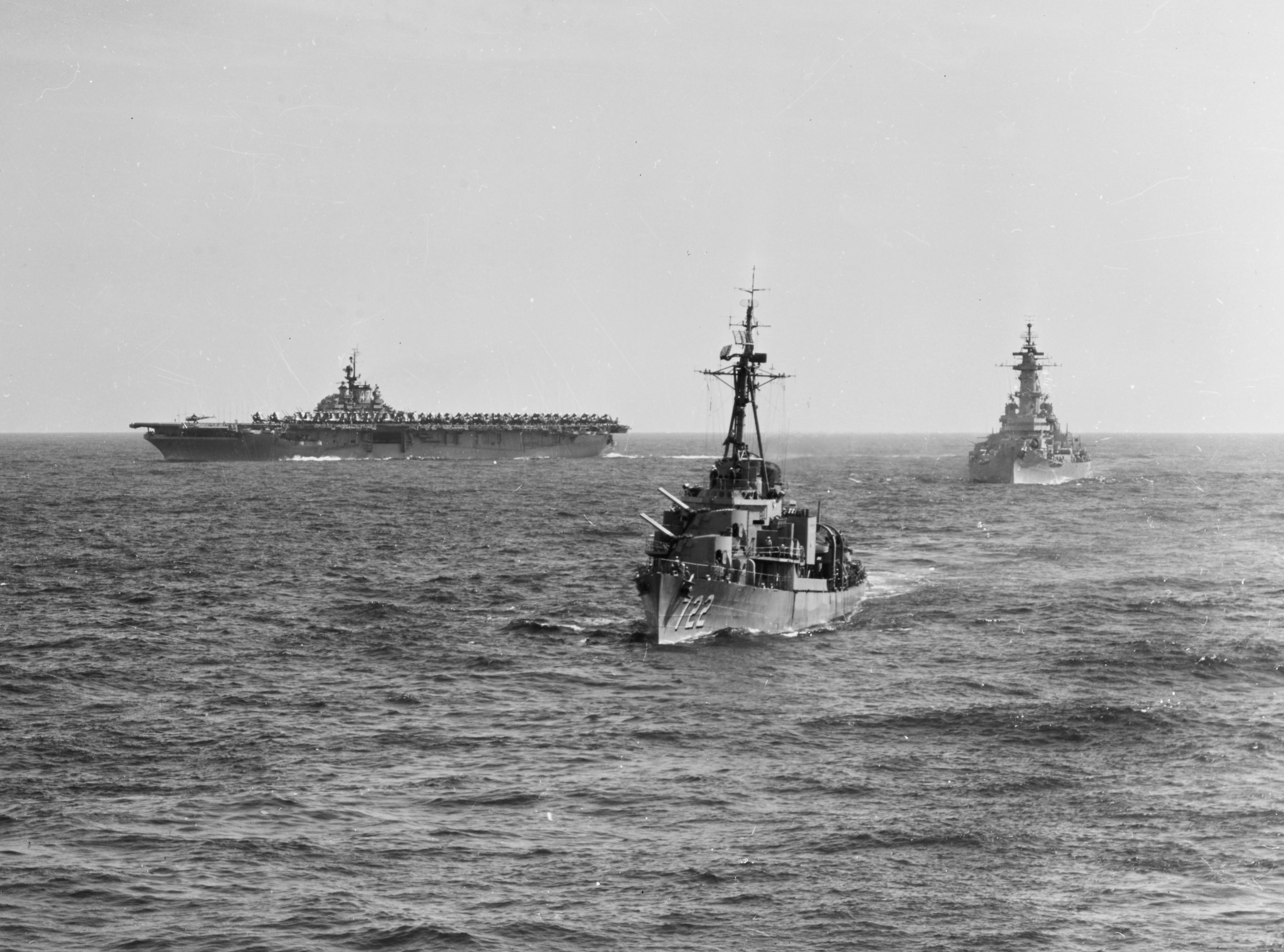
USS Barton operating with USS Iowa and USS Philippine Sea in the Sea of Japan, 1 July 1952

On 15 May 1952, Barton departed Norfolk via the Panama Canal for Korea, arriving at Yokosuka, Japan, on 18 June. She Joined Task Force 77 as a member of a hunter-killer group for operations along the east coast of Korea. On 10 August, while silencing enemy batteries on the island of Hodo Pando, Barton was hit on her number-one stack by a 105 mm (4 in) shell from an enemy shore battery. Two men were wounded. Sailor Dale P. Gray, BM3, was killed. Repair party member MMFN Anthony Palm (Johnstown, PA) was dispatched to assess the extent of damage caused by the incoming round. His initial report of ". . . it's a small hole, about 18" in diameter", grossly underestimated the actual size of nearly 4 ½ feet. After a short repair period at Yokosuka (25–31 August), she returned to Korean waters.

While operating with TF 77, she was struck by a floating mine on 16 September, and had five men missing and seven wounded. The five sailors who died were Russell J. Graf, Harold J. Savoie, John M. Sherry, Walter E. Thierfelder Jr., and black crew member, John L. Walton. Effective damage control by her crew enabled her to reach Sasebo for temporary repairs (29 September – 19 October) and then Norfolk, via the Suez Canal, for permanent repairs. She arrived at Norfolk on 12 December. Repairs completed on 15 August 1953, Barton spent the remainder of the year operating along the east coast and in the Caribbean.

On 4 January 1954, the destroyer headed for the Far East once again for another tour of duty with the 7th Fleet. After several months patrolling the waters between Okinawa and Taiwan and participating in hunter-killer exercises with Catfish, Barton steamed around the southern tip of Africa—making stops in Kenya, South Africa, Brazil, and Trinidad along the way. She moored in Norfolk on 10 August.

Barton began a schedule of training exercises and Atlantic Fleet maneuvers out of Norfolk, generally operating in the Virginia Capes area and the West Indies. Following an overhaul in the Charleston Naval Shipyard in 1955, the destroyer rejoined the Atlantic Fleet for three months of hunter-killer antisubmarine warfare training in preparation for a Mediterranean cruise.

On 28 July 1956, the destroyer departed Norfolk and entered the Mediterranean Sea on 7 August. After participating in NATO Exercise "Whipsaw", Barton and Soley steamed to Port Said, Egypt, to escort a convoy through the Suez Canal and into the Persian Gulf for a routine six-week patrol with the Middle East Force.

On 29 October, the two destroyers started south from the vicinity of Abadan, Iran, to leave the gulf, circumnavigate the Arabian Peninsula, and retransit the Suez Canal. Hostilities broke out that same day between Israel and Egypt over Egypt's premature nationalization of the canal. The war closed the canal, and subsequent international military action prompted Egypt to block it with sunken ships. Meanwhile, Barton and Soley anchored in Sitrah Harbor, Bahrain, and stood by in case a need arose to evacuate Americans from the region. Operating from Bahrain, Barton spent the next two months anchored at night and conducting tactical and gunnery drills by day. Finally, on 12 December, the destroyer received orders directing her around the Cape of Good Hope to Norfolk, where she tied up on 5 February 1957.

Following a period of upkeep, Barton prepared to put to sea on 14 March. William M. Wood and she received orders to escort the cruiser Canberra as she carried President Eisenhower to Bermuda to confer with British Prime Minister Harold Macmillan. Barton carried members of the press to the ceremony and stood sentry with William M. Wood at the entrance to the harbor. The destroyer then conducted ASW patrol and spent time in Norfolk in upkeep before going into drydock in Newport News for hull repairs. Barton exited Chesapeake Bay on 1 July and set out for yet another Mediterranean cruise. After several weeks of training operations with NATO forces and other units of the 6th Fleet, Barton anchored in Port Said on the night of 20 September. The following day, Soley and she transited the Suez Canal together once again and then headed to the Persian Gulf for a month of operations with the Iranian Navy. Upon relief by Laffey, the warship returned to the Mediterranean to participate in three more NATO exercises. She returned to Norfolk on 20 November.

For the next seven years, Barton alternated between training exercises out of Norfolk and assignments with the 6th Fleet. She made four Mediterranean deployments, eight visits to the West Indies, and one voyage to Halifax, Nova Scotia. The warship also qualified as a gunfire support ship in several exercises at Culebra and Bloodsworth Islands. On 5 February 1958, while steaming to Norfolk from the Caribbean, the destroyer received orders to assist a badly damaged Panamanian merchant ship, SS Elefterio. Barton's damage control parties could not contain the flooding caused by a large hole in Elefterio's hold, so she embarked the tanker's crew and passengers and transported them to Norfolk. In 1962, Barton covered the Project Mercury space shot carried out on 18 May in which Colonel John Glenn, USMC, became the first American to orbit the Earth. Late in October, the other units of the Atlantic Fleet and she stood to as support for the warships engaged in the quarantine of Cuba called for by President John F. Kennedy in response to the siting of Soviet nuclear missiles in Cuba. Barton rehearsed with amphibious units at Onslow Beach, North Carolina, and stood by, ready for immediate action. The ship returned to Norfolk when the crisis ended. At the end of a Mediterranean deployment in August 1963, Barton and Borie made a goodwill tour of the Baltic Sea to support Vice President Lyndon B. Johnson's Scandinavian tour. The destroyers held "open ship" for general visiting at Copenhagen, Denmark, and Helsinki, Finland, before heading home on 10 September.

In April 1965, Barton received orders to join Reserve DesRon 30, and she became flagship of the squadron in its home port of Philadelphia. Her underway periods benefited the reserve units that trained on board the destroyer, and also provided her nucleus crew with liberty visits to such ports as Fort Lauderdale, Port Everglades, West Palm Beach, and Miami, Fla.; Kingston, Jamaica; San Juan, P.R.; Freeport, Grand Bahamas; Bermuda; and Halifax, Nova Scotia. In July, Barton also steamed to Quebec and Montreal, and continued via the Saint Lawrence Seaway to Cleveland, Ohio, for a month of training combined with public awareness work about the Navy and its mission. During her remaining years in commission, Barton operated primarily between Philadelphia, Norfolk, and Guantánamo Bay.

== Fate ==
In August 1968, a board of inspection and survey determined the destroyer to be beyond economical repair. Barton was decommissioned on 30 September 1968, and her name stricken from the Naval Vessel Register on 1 October. She was sunk as a target on 8 October 1969.

== Awards ==
Barton received six battle stars for World War II service and two for Korea.
