= Barton Township =

Barton Township may refer to the following places:

in Canada

- Barton Township, Ontario, former name for a portion of Hamilton, Ontario

in the United States

- Barton Township, Gibson County, Indiana
- Barton Township, Michigan
