= Marie-Hélène Crombé-Berton =

Belgian politician

Senator
- In office 28 June 2007 – June 2011

Personal details
- Born: 18 July 1960 (age 65) Frameries
- Party: MR

Marie-Hélène Crombé-Berton (born 1960) is a Belgian politician and a member of the MR. She was elected as a member of the Belgian Senate in 2007.
