= Barton (1801 ship) =

Great Britain
- Name: Barton
- Owner: Seller & Co., Robert Seller
- Builder: Bermuda
- Launched: 1799
- Captured: 1803 & 1811
- Fate: Wrecked 27 April 1819

General characteristics
- Tons burthen: 165, or 171 (bm)
- Armament: 2 × 4-pounder guns + 2 × 6-pounder carronades

Barton was launched in Bermuda, probably in 1799, and built of Bermuda cedar. She first appeared in registers under the Barton name in 1801 as a slave ship in the triangular trade in enslaved people. The French captured her in 1803 before she had delivered the captives she had purchased for her second voyage. She returned to British ownership but her whereabouts between 1804 and 1810 are obscure. In 1811, she was again captured by a French privateer, which however gave her up. She grounded on 27 April 1819 at the entrance to the Sierra Leone River and was wrecked.

== Career ==
Barton entered Lloyd's Register in 1801 with J. Wilson, master, Seller & Co., owner, and trade Liverpool–Africa. She entered the Register of Shipping in 1802 with the same master and owner, and origin.

First voyage transporting enslaved people (1801-1802): Captain John Wilson sailed from Liverpool on 19 November 1801, bound for West Africa. In 1801, 147 vessels sailed from English ports, bound for the trade in enslaved people; 122 of these vessels sailed from Liverpool.

Barton started acquiring captives on 12 December 1812 in the area between Rio Nuñez and the Assini River. She arrived at St Thomas, Danish West Indies on 28 July 1802 with 166 captives. She left St Thomas on 13 September and arrived back at Liverpool on 17 October.

Second voyage transporting enslaved people (1802-capture): Captain Wilson sailed from Liverpool on 23 December 1802, with 21 crew members, bound for West Africa. In 1802, 155 vessels sailed from English ports, bound for the trade in enslaved people; 122 of these vessels sailed from Liverpool.

Barton embarked an estimated 310 captives at Rio Nuñez. On her way to the West Indies the French captured her. Her captors took her into Basse-Terre, Guadeloupe, where they landed 279 captives.

Lloyd's List reported on 6 December 1803 that Barton had been captured and taken into Guadeloupe. The Register of Shipping for 1804 carried the annotation "Captured" by her name.

In 1803, 11 British vessels in the triangular trade were lost, the lowest total in the period 1793-1807. Seven of the losses occurred in the Middle Passage as the ships sailed from Africa to the West Indies. War, not maritime hazards nor resistance by the captives, was the greatest cause of vessel losses among British slave vessels.

The report below suggests that Barton returned to British ownership, but it is not clear how. Moreover, she did not reappear in Lloyd's Register with changed data until 1810.

A report in 1804 from Charleston, South Carolina, stated that the master of the British vessel Barton had come from Guadeloupe and had reported to the Collector of the Customs at Charleston that a French privateer had captured an American ship and a brig, both of New York. The ship was Hopewell, Sisson, master, and the brig Rockland, Akins, master. The American lost 16 men killed and wounded, and the French several killed and wounded. When Rockland struck the "French people of colour" who were aboard her jumped overboard, drowning themselves. The context was that the French had banned all trade with Haiti during the Haitian Revolution and were treating as pirates any armed vessels conducting such trade. Furthermore, in this particular case one of Rockland's passengers was said to have been a black general, and she was carrying mail to Haiti. The French authorities in Guadeloupe condemned Rockwell as a prize of war.

Barton, of 171 tons (bm), launched at Bermuda in 1799, re-entered Lloyd's Register in 1810.

Year	Master	Owner	Trade	Source & notes
1810	S.Hunt	S.Minot	London–Gibraltar	LR; new deck and coppered 1806
1811	S.Hunt; W.Lewis	S.Minot; Hogg & Co.	London–Gibraltar	LR; new deck and coppered 1806

On 5 February 1811, Barton, Hunt, master, arrived at the Downs. She had been returning to England from Messina and Swansea when a French privateer had captured her off Dungeness. The privateer took off six of Barton's crew, but then gave her up as the winds were such that the privateer did not believe that she could get her prize into port.

Year	Master	Owner	Trade	Source & notes
1814	W.Lewis; J.Beven	Hogg & Co.	London–Malta	LR; new deck and coppered 1806
1815	J.Beven	Falden & Co.	London–Malta	LR; new deck and coppered 1806
1816	J.Beven; T.Sampson	Falden & Co.	London–Madeira	LR; new deck and coppered 1806
1820	T.Sampson	Falden & Co.	London–Sierra Leone	LR; new deck and coppered 1806

== Fate ==
On 27 April 1819, Barton, Sampson, master, was driven onshore on a bank at the entrance to the Sierra Leone river. She bilged, but a considerable part of her cargo and stores was saved.
