= Barton (1811 ship) =

UK merchant ship 1811–1823

History

United Kingdom
- Name: Barton
- Owner: Barkworth & Hawkes
- Builder: Barkworth & Hawkes, Hull, Yorkshire
- Launched: 1811
- Fate: Wrecked 9 September 1823

General characteristics
- Tons burthen: 447 (bm)
- Armament: 6 × 6-pounder guns + 10 × 18-pounder guns ("of the New Construction")

Barton was launched at Hull in 1811. She sailed as a general trader and made voyages to the West Indies and the East Indies. She was lost in 1823 on a voyage to the Baltic.

== Career ==
Barton first appeared in Lloyd's Register in 1811 with Mason, master, Barkworth, owner, and trade London–Jamaica.

Year	Master	Owner	Trade	Notes & source
1815	W. Walker	Barkworth	London transport London–West Indies	Register of Shipping
1820	Gouir	Barkworth	London–Java	Damages repaired 1815; Lloyd's Register
1820	Nelson	Barkworth	Southampton–Saint Helena	Register of Shipping

In 1813 the British East India Company (EIC) lost its monopoly on trade between Britain and India. Many shipowners then sailed their vessels under a license from the EIC on voyages on that route. Barton's owners applied for a licence on 23 November 1814, and received the licence the same day.

One list of "Licensed Ships" shows Barton sailing from Southampton to Bombay in 1818. A list in Lloyd's Register shows Barton, T. Forest, master, sailing on 18 August 1818 to Bombay.

The Register of Shipping for 1824 showed Barton, J. Bacon, master, Barkworth, owner, and trade Hull-Petersburg, Russia.

== Fate ==
Barton, Bacon, master, was wrecked on 9 September 1823 on the west coast of Jutland while she was on a voyage from to Hull to Petersburg. Her crew were rescued.
