= Barton (given name) =

Barton is a masculine given name, sometimes shortened to Bart or Barty, which may refer to:

== People ==
- Barton Bates (1824–1892), a justice of the Supreme Court of Missouri from 1862 to 1865
- Barton Bernstein (born 1936), American historian
- Barton Biggs (1932–2012), American money manager and hedge fund founder
- Barton Booth (1681–1733), English actor
- Bart Bryant (born 1962), American golfer
- Barton Gellman (born 1960), American journalist and author
- Barton Kay Kirkham (1936–1958), American murderer
- Barton Lui Pan-To (born 1993), Hong Kong short track speed skater
- Barton Lynch (born 1963), Australian surfer
- Barton MacLane (1902–1969), American actor, playwright and screenwriter
- Barton McLean (born 1938), American composer, performer, music reviewer and writer
- Barton Myers (born 1934), American architect
- Bart Peterson (born 1958), American lawyer and politician
- Barton C. Pope (1813/1814–c. 1862), American politician
- Barty Smith (born 1952), American football player
- Barton Levi St. Armand
- Barton W. Stone (1772–1844), American preacher
- Barton Yarborough (1900–1951), American actor, primarily in radio
- Barton Kyle Yount (1884–1949), United States Army lieutenant general
- Barton Zwiebach (born 1954), Peruvian physicist

== Fictional characters ==
- Barton Fink, title character of the 1991 film Barton Fink, played by John Turturro
- Barton Hamilton, the third Green Goblin, an enemy of Spiderman
- Barton Winslow, a character from Shining Time Station, played by Gerald Parkes
