= Tom Bergin's =

Coordinates: 34.06003°N 118.36263°W

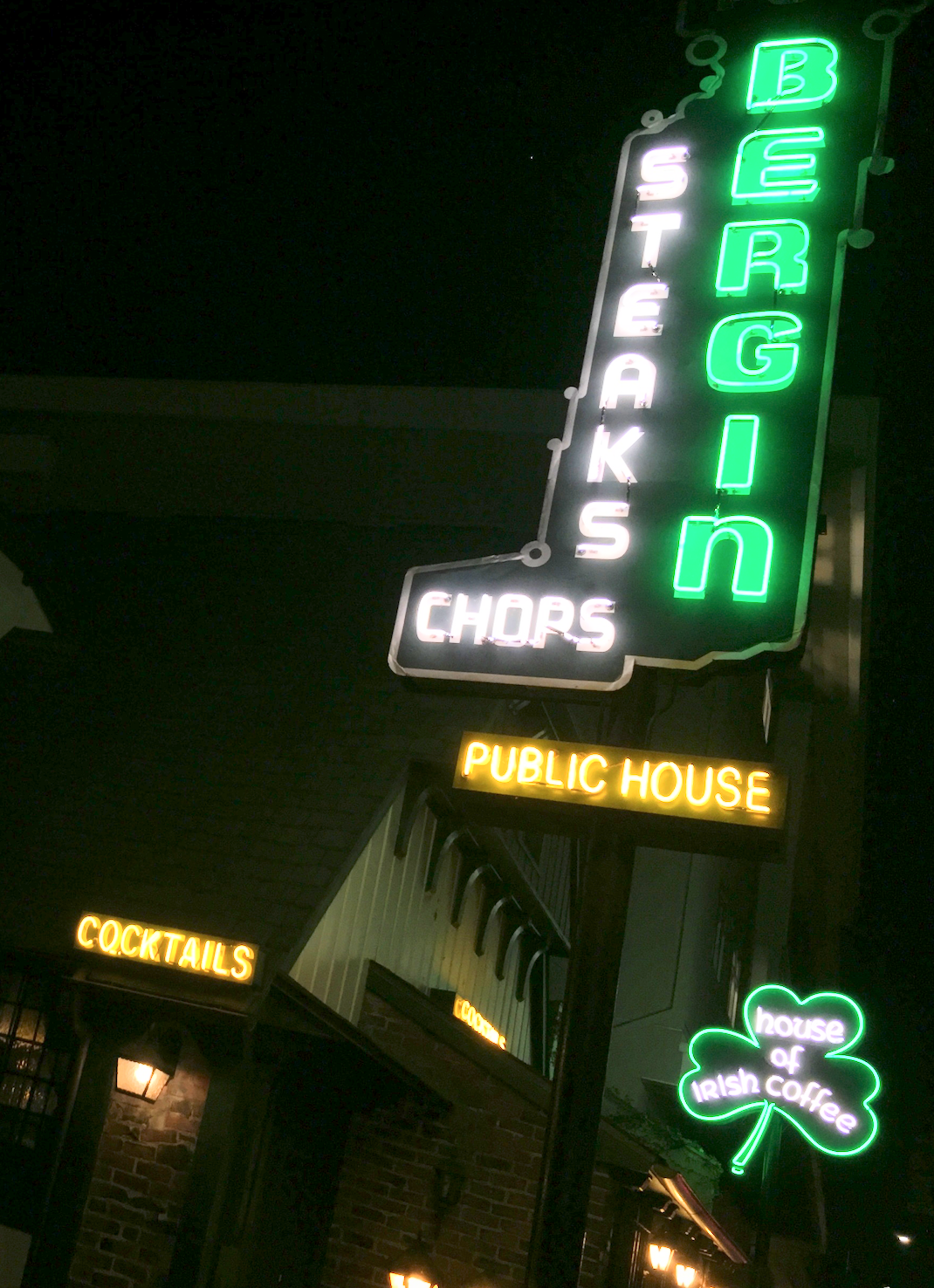
- Tom Bergin's neon sign in February 2018.
- Industry: Irish pub
- Founded: 1936; 90 years ago
- Headquarters: 840 S. Fairfax Ave., Los Angeles, California, U.S.
- Website: tombergins.com

Tom Bergin's Tavern is one of the oldest restaurant/bars in continuous operation in Los Angeles, California. Originally opened at 6110 Wilshire Boulevard in 1936 by lawyer Tom Bergin as The Old Horseshoe Tavern it has been at its current location at 840 South Fairfax Avenue, just south of Wilshire, since 1949. In previous years it has also been known as The Old Horseshoe Tavern and Kennel Club as well as Tom Bergin's Horseshoe Tavern and Thoroughbred Club. The restaurant and bar is considered by Angelenos as an institution.

== History ==
The tavern is known for its annual St. Patrick's Day celebration, which was co-hosted by Los Angeles Mayor Eric Garcetti in 2017.

The tavern is also known for its tradition of placing cardboard shamrocks on the walls and ceilings to memorialize the names of its favored customers. Among the famous names with shamrocks are Tommy Lasorda, Kiefer Sutherland, Ronald Reagan and Cary Grant.

Tom Bergin's is also famous for its Irish coffee drink. Although the Buena Vista Cafe in San Francisco is generally credited with introducing the drink in the United States in 1952, Tom Bergin's claims to have been the originator have been disputed. A large, shamrock-shaped sign in front of Tom Bergin's reading "House of Irish Coffee" has been in place since the early 1950s.

== Gallery ==
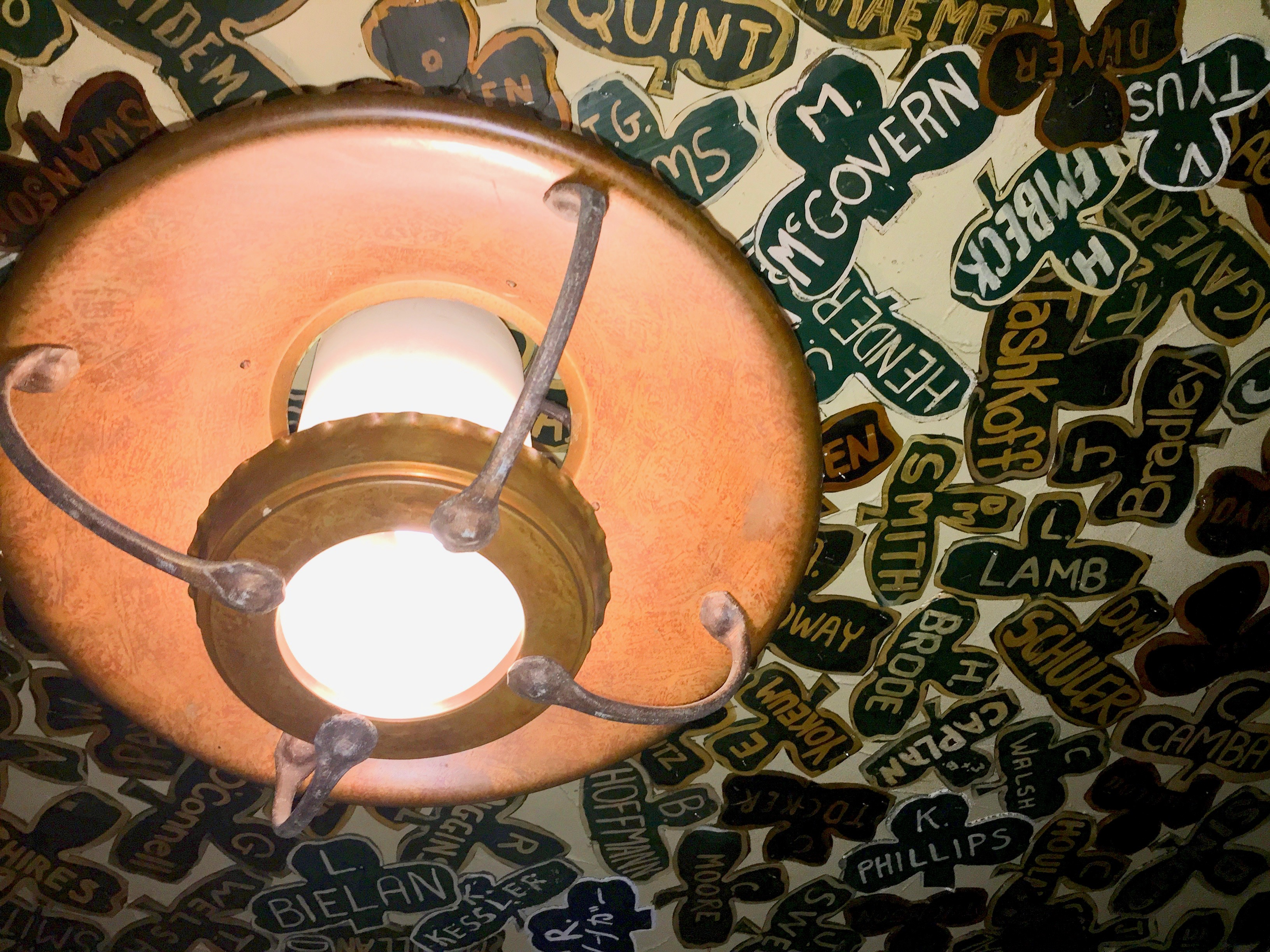

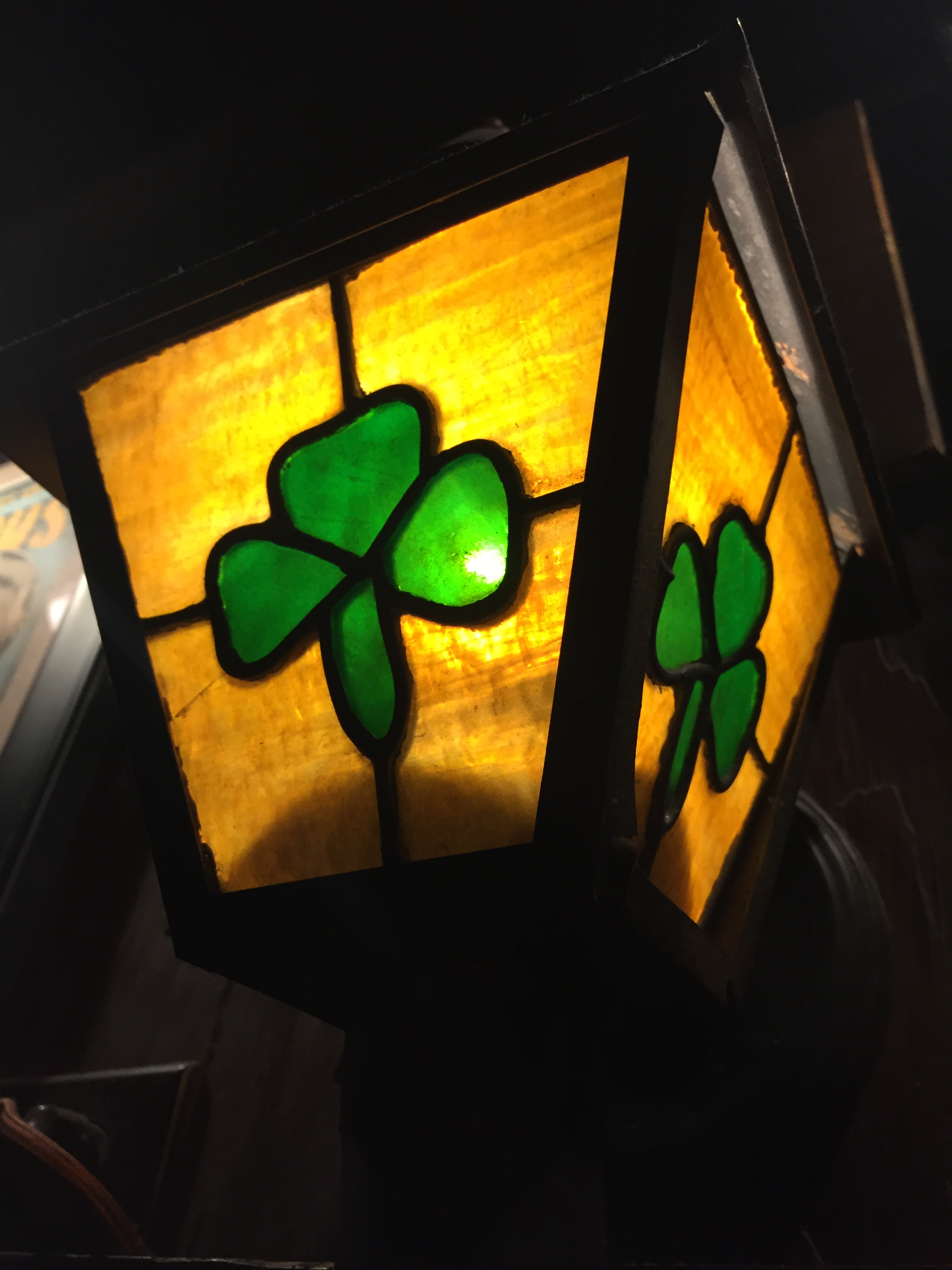

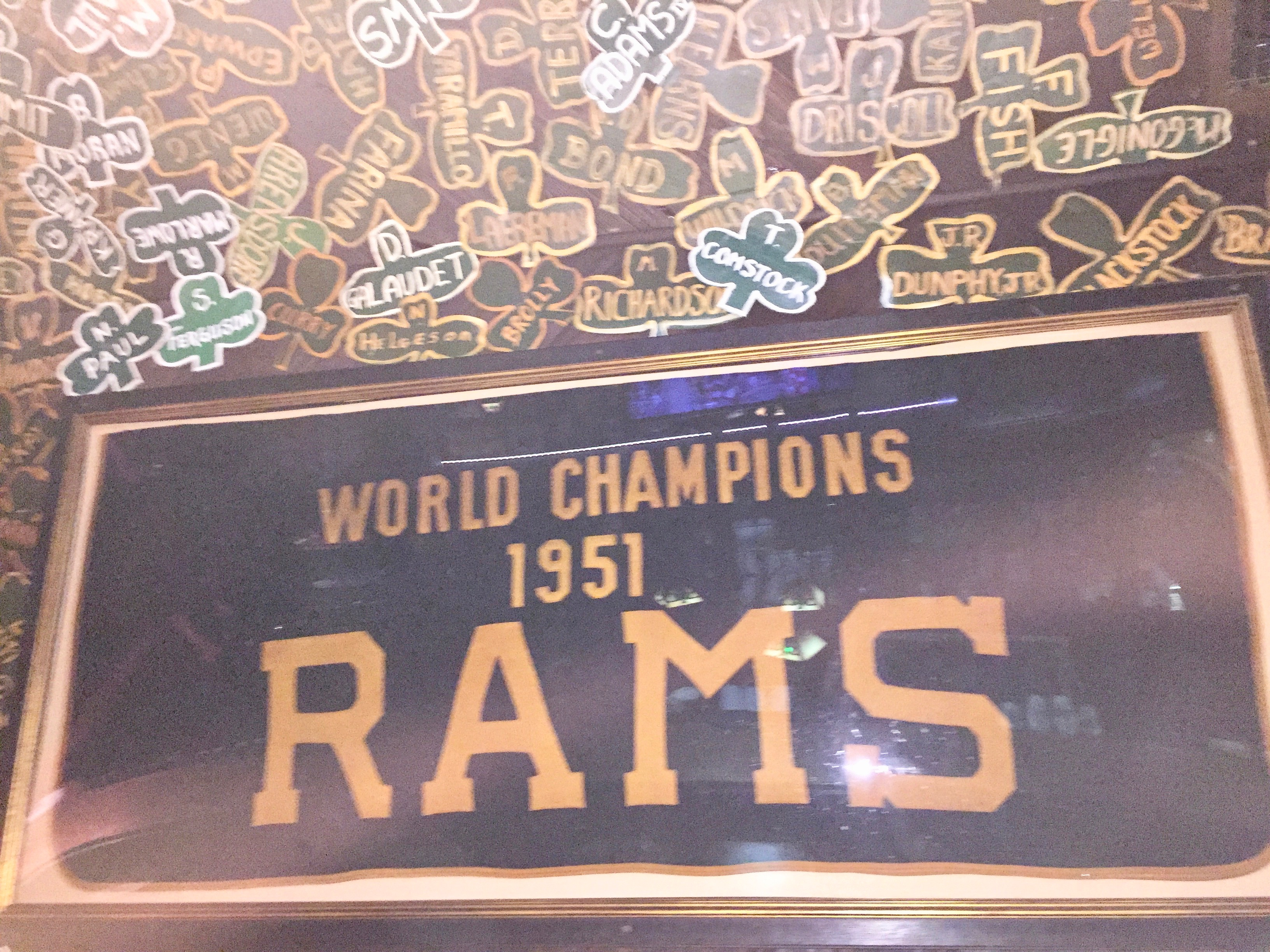

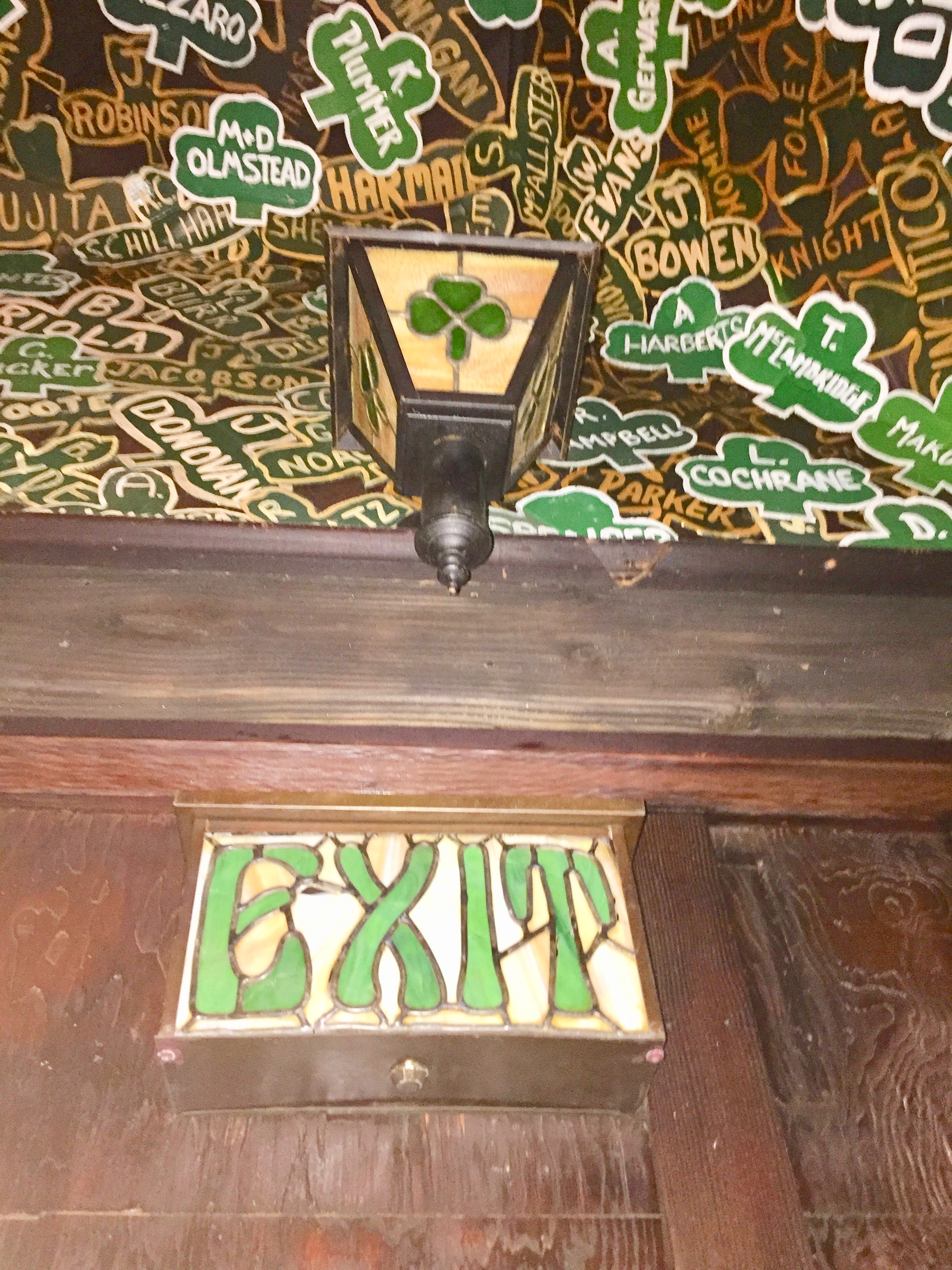

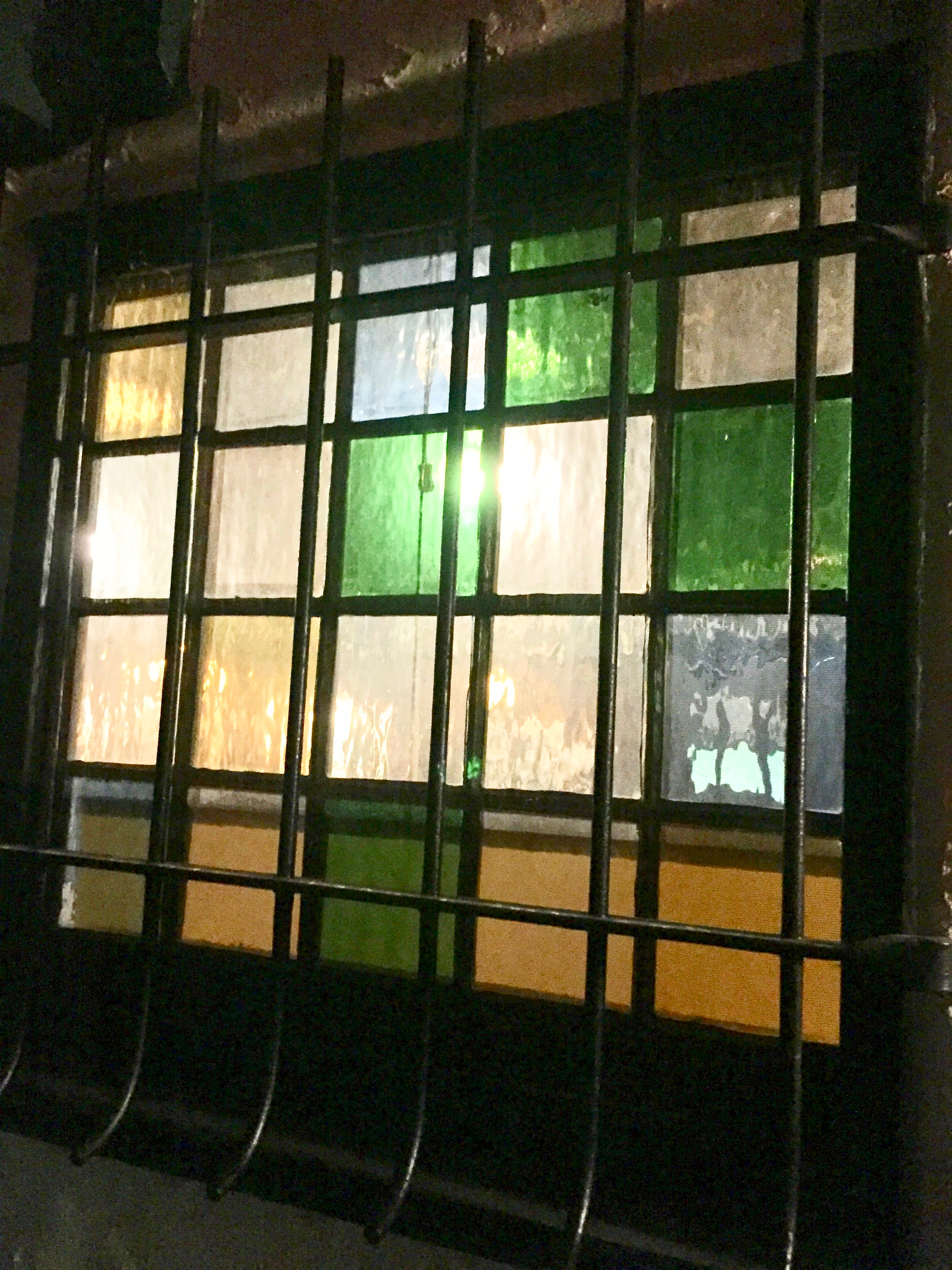

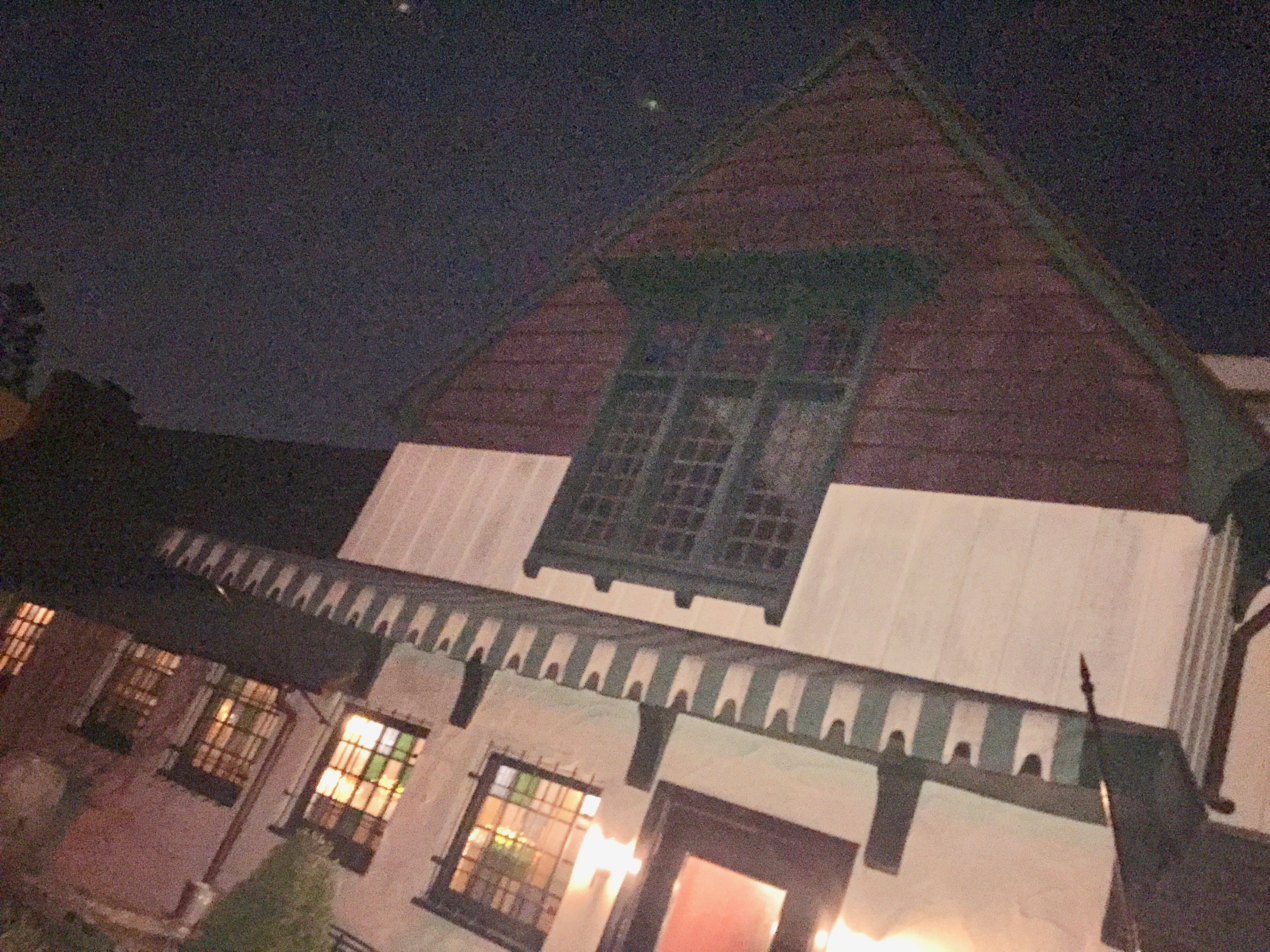

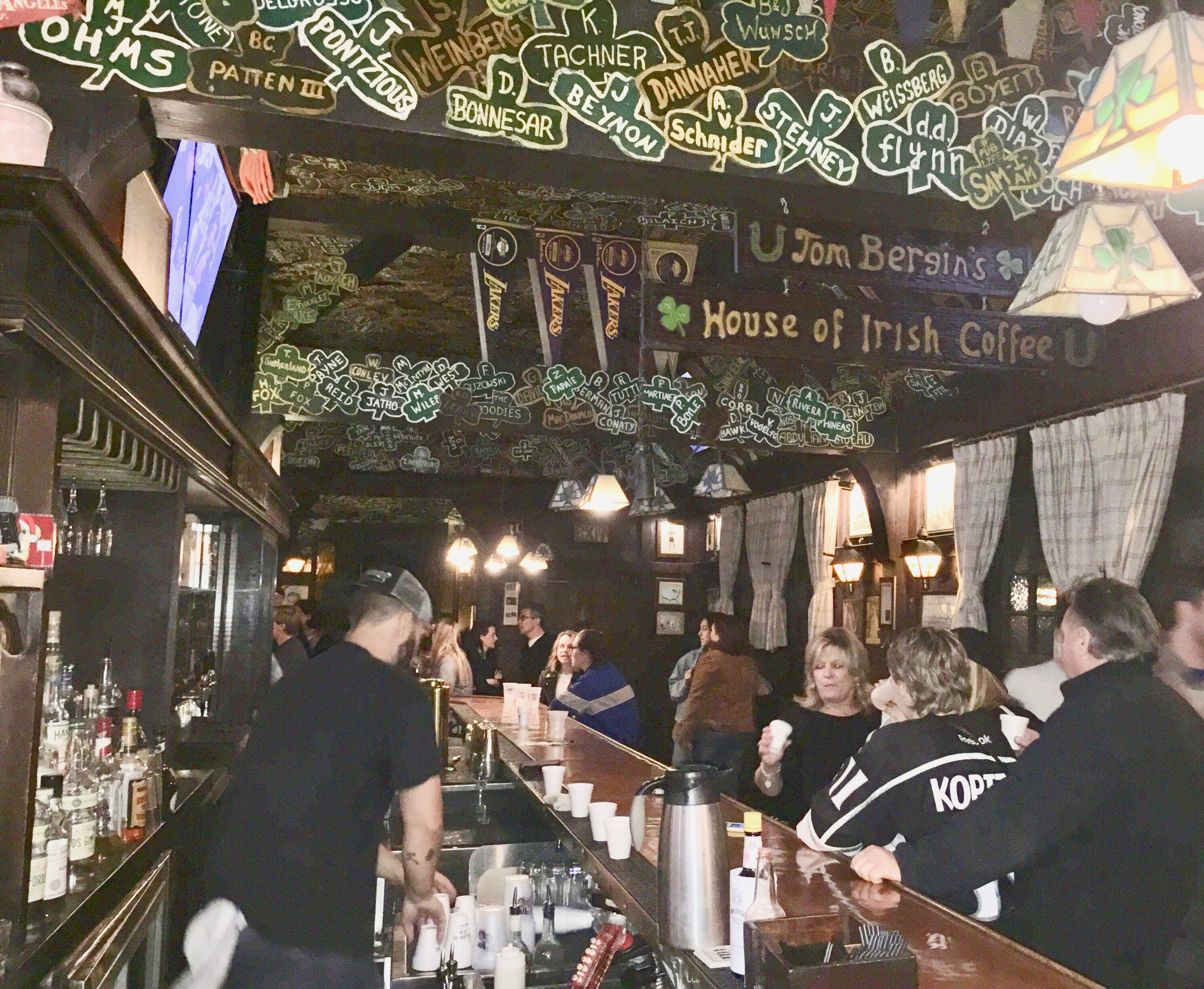

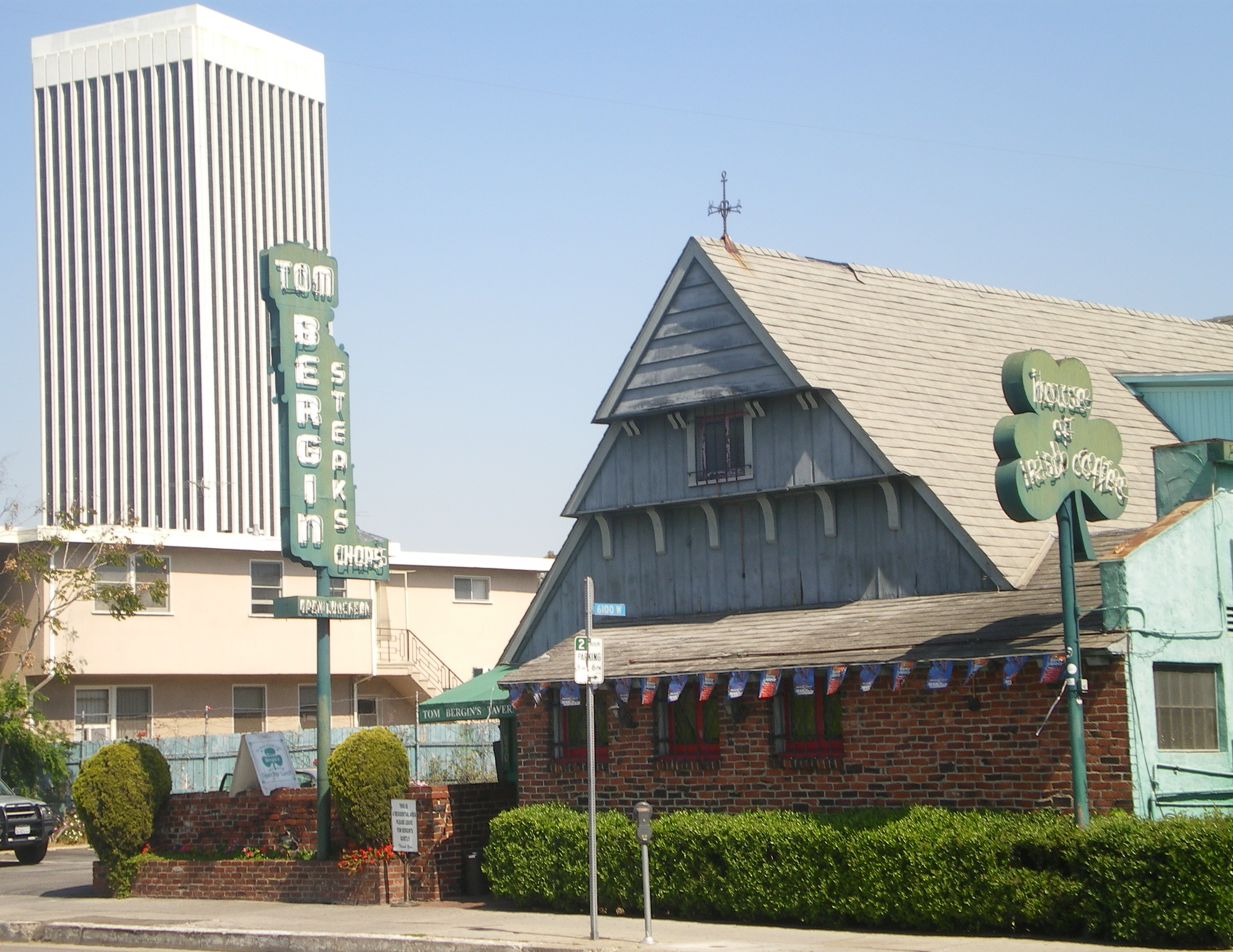
