= Riverside Miniature Railway =

Attraction in Riverside Park, St Neots, Cambridgeshire, England

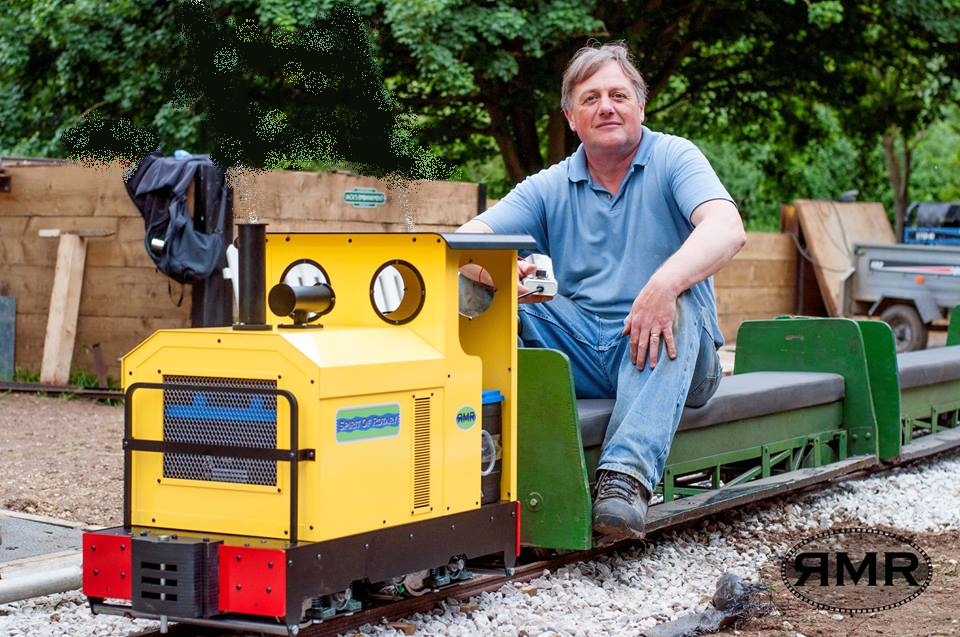
- RMR founder and chairman Ivan Hewlett
- Interactive map of Riverside Miniature Railway
- Theme: Ridable miniature railway

Attractions
- Total: 1

Riverside Park, St Neots, England
- Coordinates: 52.224879°N 0.274902°W
- Opened: August 2017

The Riverside Miniature Railway (RMR) is a miniature railway in Riverside Park, Eaton Ford, St Neots, Cambridgeshire. Founded by Ivan Hewlett, the railway is run on a not-for-profit (CIC), community basis.

== History ==
The club was started in April 2016, and the railway opened in July 2017.

== Gauges ==
The main railway is 7 1/4 in (184 mm) gauge, with an additional rail to allows 5 in (127 mm) gauge trains to run. G scale trains can also be run using the outer rails.
