= Duloe Brook =

River in Bedfordshire, England

Coordinates: 52°13′08″N 0°16′50″W

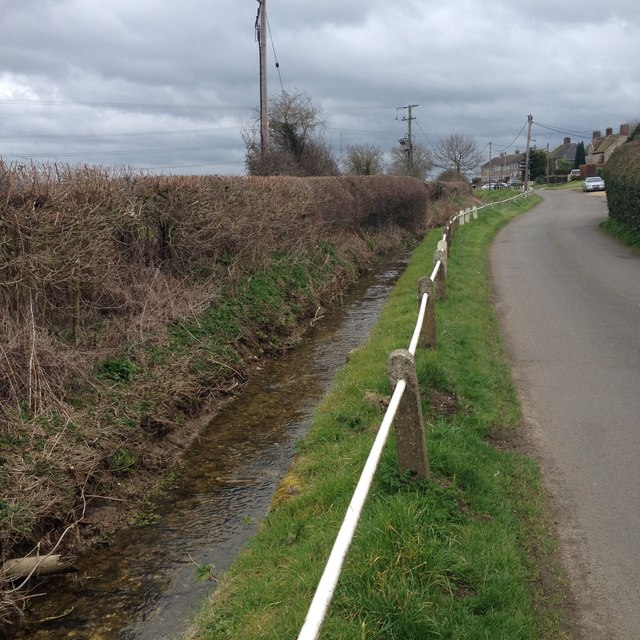
Duloe Brook in Staploe, looking East

Duloe Brook is a minor, roughly 9 km (5.59 mi) long river (or brook) in Bedfordshire that is a tributary to the River Great Ouse. The brook rises in the hamlet of Keysoe Row and flows southwards then eastwards towards the village of Staploe and hamlet of Duloe, before flowing into the River Great Ouse at the village of Eaton Ford in St Neots. Its last half kilometre or so denotes the boundary between Eaton Ford and Eaton Socon.
