= Eaton Socon =

District of St Neots, England

Coordinates: 52.22°N 0.29°W

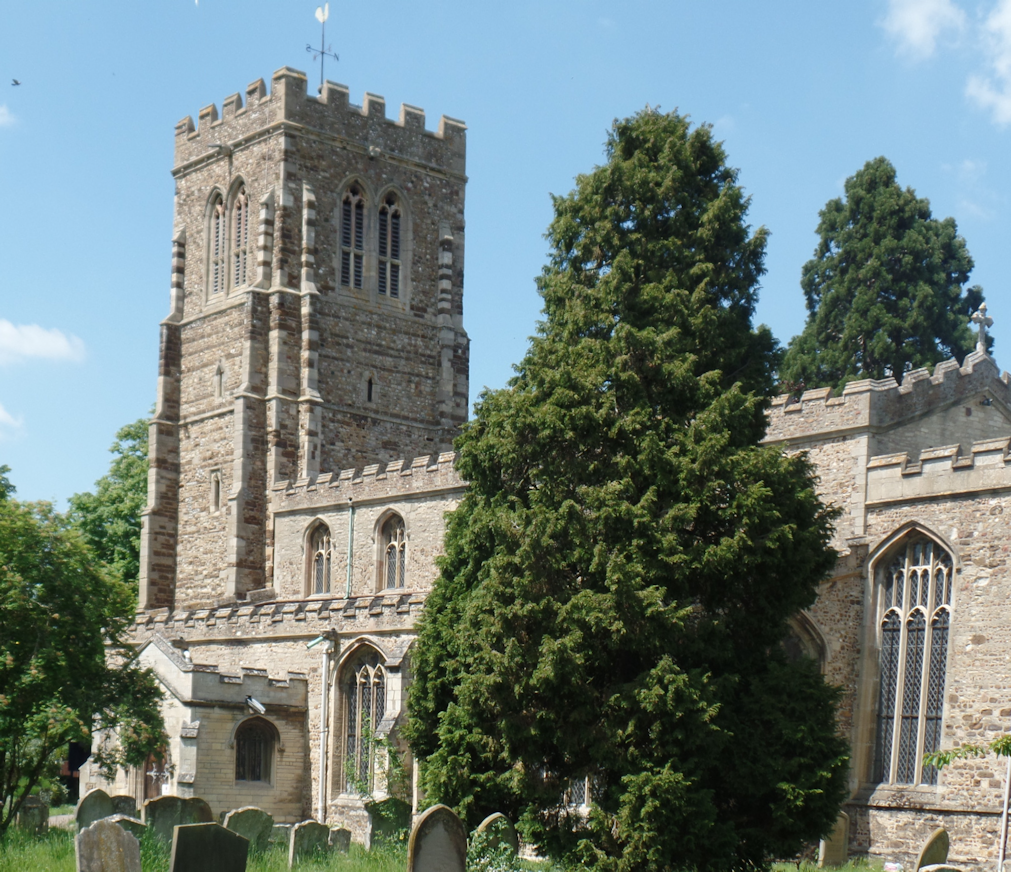
- Eaton Socon church

- Location within Cambridgeshire
- Area: 2.08 km^{2} (0.80 sq mi)
- Population: 5,704
  - Density: 2,742/km^{2} (7,100/sq mi)
- OS grid reference: TL165595
- Civil parish: St Neots
- District: Huntingdonshire
- Shire county: Cambridgeshire
- Region: East
- Country: England
- Sovereign state: United Kingdom
- Post town: ST NEOTS
- Postcode district: PE19
- Dialling code: 01480
- Police: Cambridgeshire
- Fire: Cambridgeshire
- Ambulance: East of England
- UK Parliament: Huntingdon

Eaton Socon /iːtən soʊkən/ is a district of St Neots, in the civil parish of St Neots, in the Huntingdonshire district, in the county of Cambridgeshire, England, 1.4 miles south-west of St Neots town centre. Eaton Socon is a component of the town of St Neots, located on its south-west margin. Eaton Socon lies on the west side of the River Great Ouse, and is bounded on the west by the A1 road and on the south by the A428 road (St Neots by-pass). On the north side Duloe Brook delineates the boundary with Eaton Ford, which is also part of St Neots.

Much of Eaton Socon is given over to residential use, but there is a large area dedicated to light industry and trade distribution activities. There are also several public houses and inns, and a retail park.

In the days of stagecoach travel, Eaton Socon was a major stop on the journey from London to the North, with inns providing refreshments and overnight accommodation for travellers, and feed and rest facilities for horses. Some stage coaches diverted through St Neots, but the majority continued on the Great North Road.

Eaton Socon was originally in Bedfordshire but it was merged with St Neots in 1965 and is now in Cambridgeshire. Its housing grew and its population more than doubled: 2,240 in 1931 to 3,264 in 1961, and now (2020) 9,042.

The name Eaton Socon comes from Ea-tun (waterside settlement) and soke (local government area in Norman times).

== Eaton Socon in the present ==
Eaton Socon is an area of housing, forming part of St Neots. Lying on the west side of the town, and between the River Great Ouse and the A1 trunk road. It is aligned on the north–south axis, formed by the original Great North Road (now designated B1428). General shopping and travel-to-work patterns have merged over recent decades, so that for many practical purposes Eaton Socon is simply a part of St Neots.

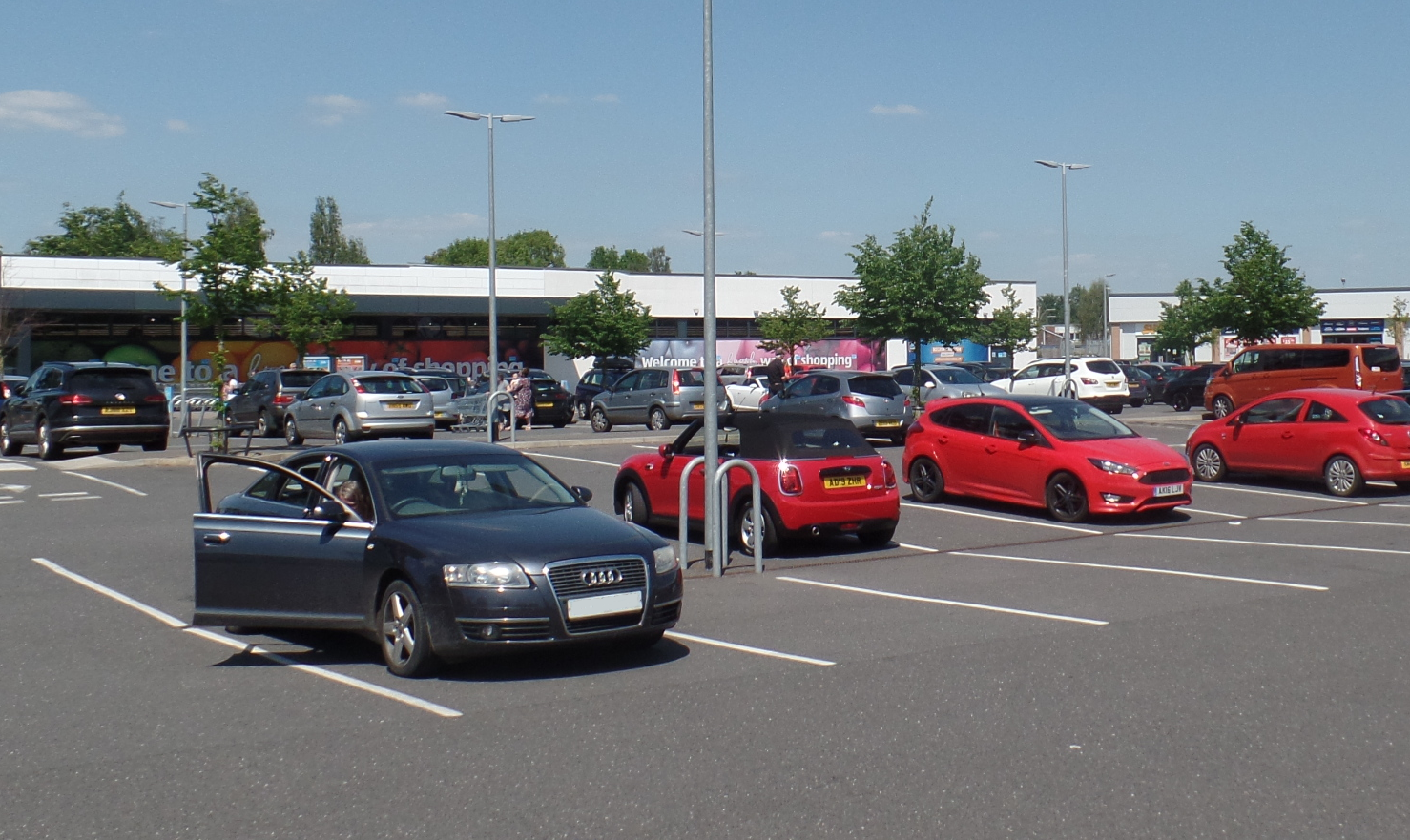
Eaton Socon retail park

The Little End Industrial Estate is home to a range of light industrial units, at the southern end of Eaton Socon; on the other side of the Great North Road is the Quora Industrial Estate and a retail park. There are three discount supermarkets in this area as well as a large do-it-yourself store and some specialist retail businesses.

Towards the north end of Eaton Socon, there is a medium-sized Co-op supermarket on the Old Great North Road.

Bushmead Primary School is within Eaton Socon.

Just down the Mill Hill and close to nearby Eaton Ford, there is a scout hut, named Eaton Socon Scout Hut, that hosts activities for their scouts and hosts St Neots Children's Karate Academy, a branch of karate company Fusion Martial Arts and many more activities.

== History ==
=== Early history ===
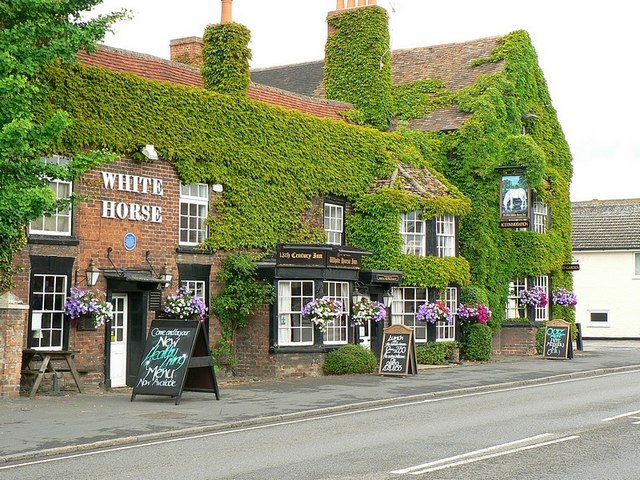
The White Horse Inn

There were probably a few scattered settlements around Eaton Socon in the Neolithic period. The first definite record reports that an Anglo-Saxon leader took control of a village near the river near Duloe Brook, and this was called Ea-tun, meaning waterside-village. Another settlement a little further north was called Forda, and later simply Ford.

In this time period, the river was wider and shallower than it is currently, in dryer seasons it was possible to ford it.

The majority of the population were pagan, and the Pope sent Augustine in 597 AD, to impose Christianity. Augustine's work was successful and a hundred years later most of East Anglia was Christian. A mother church was built in Eaton to serve as a focus for a large area on the west bank of the Great Ouse.

=== The Norman Conquest ===
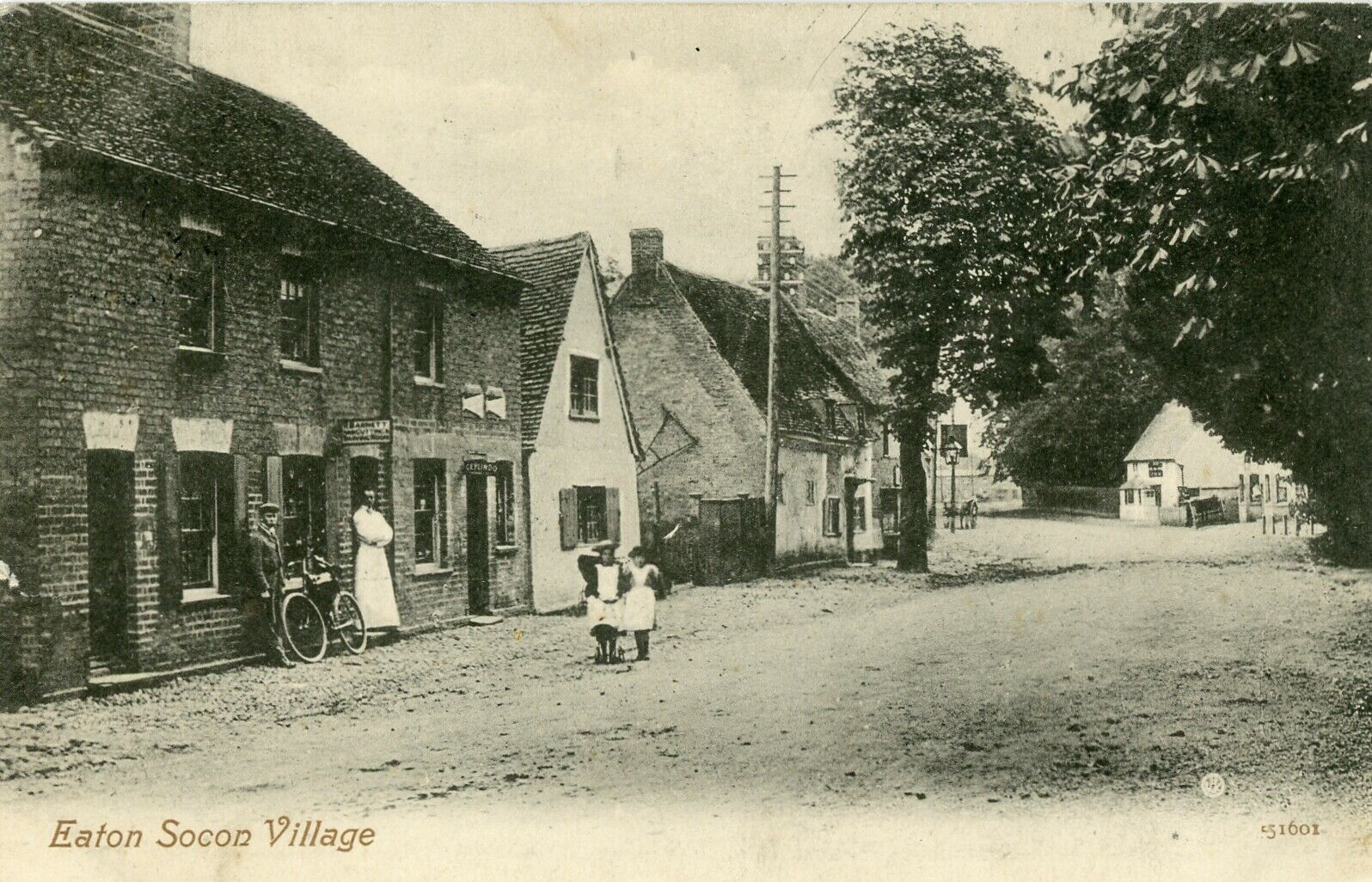
Eaton Socon and Waggon and Horses public house

The local landholder at Eaton at the time of the Norman Conquest was Ulmar, a thegn (or thane) and he was superior to two sokemen; the soke was a subsidiary area of land and control. In time the area became known as Soka de Eton by 1247 AD. In 1645 it was known as Eton cum Soca, and in the nineteenth century this had become Eaton Socon.

The manor of Eaton included two water mills, a church and a priest; there were 38 villein families, seven smallholders and eight tied labourers. The manor of Eaton was allocated at first to Lisois de Moutiers, but by the time of the Domesday Book in 1086 it had been transferred to Eudo Dapifer; he was a steward in the Royal household, and therefore an extremely important person, bringing prestige to Eaton.

In this period the Priory at St Neots, at the time still considered part of Eynesbury, was gaining in importance because of the presence of the relics of Saint Neot, an important and famous holy man. Eventually that part of Eynesbury became known as St Neots as a result. At the same time a small religious house was established in Eaton Socon. William of Colmworth and a group of monks, not affiliated to any particular order, was given a site at Bushmead by Hugh de Beauchamp, who had his base in Bedford, in about 1195. After 1215 the site became an Augustinian priory, but it never rivalled the prestige of the St Neots priory.

=== Eaton Socon Castle ===
Hugh de Beauchamp built a castle in present-day Eaton Socon around 1140. It was probably of timber construction with earthworks and may never have been completed, but the earth mound still exists. It is a scheduled monument referred to as The Hillings. The castle was built during a period of civil war over the succession to the throne. Matilda was the heir to King Henry I but a faction of barons supported King Stephen. In the civil war that followed several fortified positions were quickly thrown up, in support of Stephen. One of these was Eaton Socon Castle. Stephen's supporters won and he was installed as king. When he died in 1154, Matilda's son Henry succeeded as King Henry II. One of his first acts was to order the demolition of the castles, which were referred to as adulterine.

Some habitable accommodation must have remained, and was occupied in the 13th century by a Lady Juliana de Beauchamp. Notwithstanding its demolition, the castle and the remaining residential occupation conferred considerable prestige on Eaton. Only an earth mound remains at the present day.

=== Turnpikes and stage coaches ===
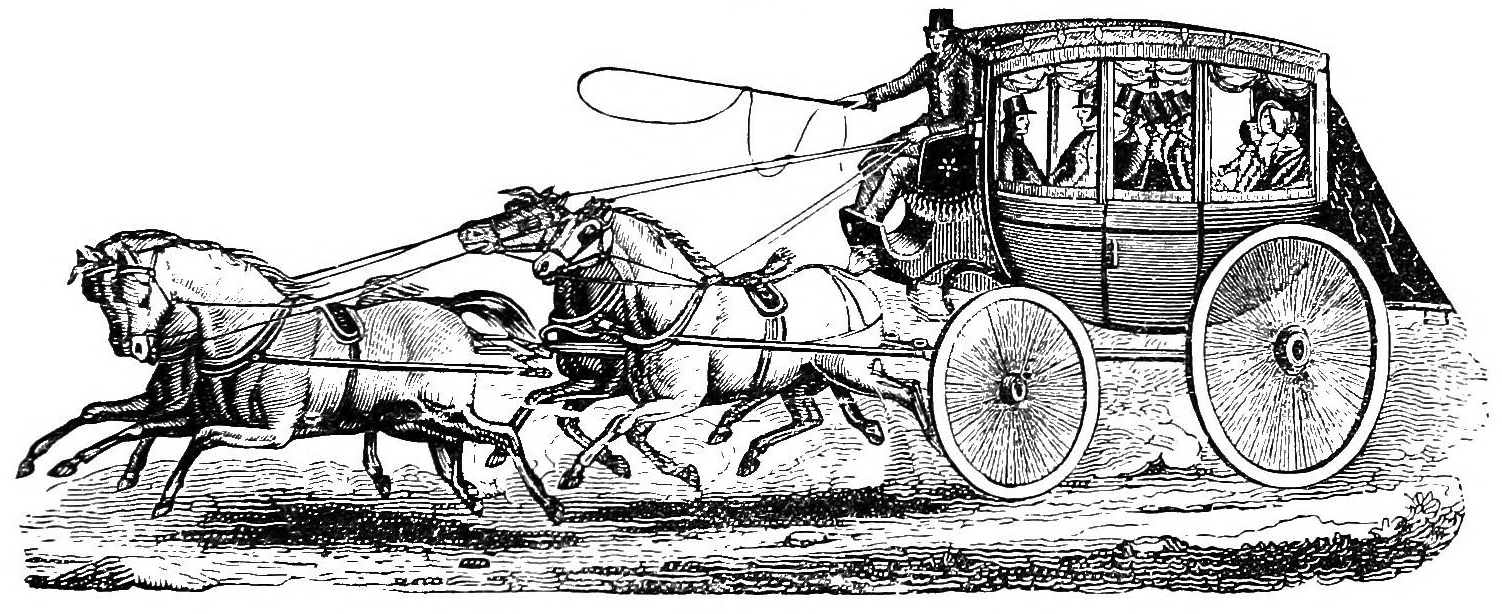
A stagecoach in 1867

The roads that were adequate for static populations in the sixteenth century were becoming a hindrance to the commercial progress. By 1700 a few turnpikes had been set up: a turnpike was a toll road: the toll income was used to improve and maintain the road surface. The tolls were resented by people who had formerly used the road for nothing.

Eventually local Acts of Parliament were passed to enable turnpike trusts to manage sections of road. In 1725 a Trust was established to manage the Great North Road between Biggleswade and Alconbury.

Improved roads meant more travelling and the number of coaches and carriages passing through St Neots and Eaton Socon increased. It was during the 18th century that road travel reached its zenith, when the stagecoach was introduced. Teams of horses were changed at intervals of 10 or 12 miles, known as stages, enabling the coach to keep going, stopping only for the change, and for meal stops. Coaching inns along the line of route arranged the feed and rest of the horses and had them ready at the specified time for the next run by the same coach operator. Overnight accommodation was provided, as in general any long transit took several days, although some coaches continued through the night. Feed for the horses was the largest expense for the operator.

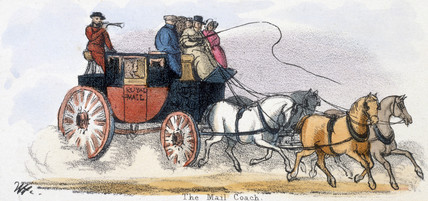
A Mail Coach, about 1845

By 1754 coaches were travelling from London as far as Edinburgh. At the height of stagecoach activity there were 20 coaches passing through Eaton Socon daily, "some of them going straight up the Great North Road after changing horses at The White Horse and others taking the loop through St Neots. At The Cross Keys Inn mail was collected as well as passengers".

The routes converged again at Alconbury Hill with stagecoaches using the Old North Road, the stretch from there to Norman Cross was the busiest length of road in England. Stagecoaches passed along this section at the rate of one every 20 minutes day and night, and the Bell Inn at Stilton, where teams of horses were changed, had stabling for over 300 horses.

The carriage of goods was by river, and the River Great Ouse was navigable up to Eaton Socon. Some medium distance goods transport was by stage cart, or by pack horse.

=== The Cock Inn ===
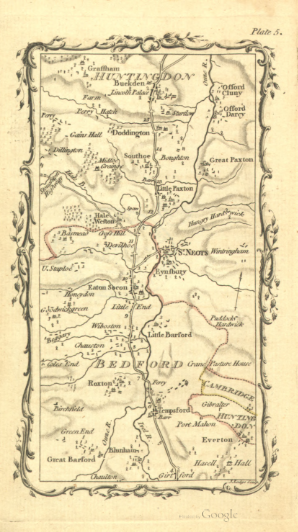
Stagecoach route map around Eaton Socon dated 1776

The Cock Inn stood to the north of Eaton Socon Green, between the church and the corner of Peppercorn Lane. It was a large, elegant building of brick with a clay-tiled roof, and double bay windows. It was a well-known hostelry in the 18th century, with a reputation for good food. Lord Torrington, writing in his diary in 1794, was very complimentary about it. His bill came to 9s 10d and consisted of 4s for dinners, 1s 3d for wine, 1s 4d for brandy, 4d for beer and 6d for coffee. There was also 1s 9d for servants and 6d for horses. The Cock was a posting house, meaning that horses could be hired there; The Cock was never a stagecoach inn.

The Cock also acted as a meeting place for official business. In a letter recorded in Letters to William Frend, Mr Reynolds of Paxton Hall tells of "a very full meeting of the Commissioners of Biggleswade Turnpike Road at The Cock Inn, Eaton" in 1800, where the builder of Hail Heston bridge was reprimanded "for his neglect in repairing the breach caused by the flood".

The Cock Inn disappeared some time in the 1920s, although its signboard is said to have survived a few years longer.

=== Reference in Nicolas Nickleby ===
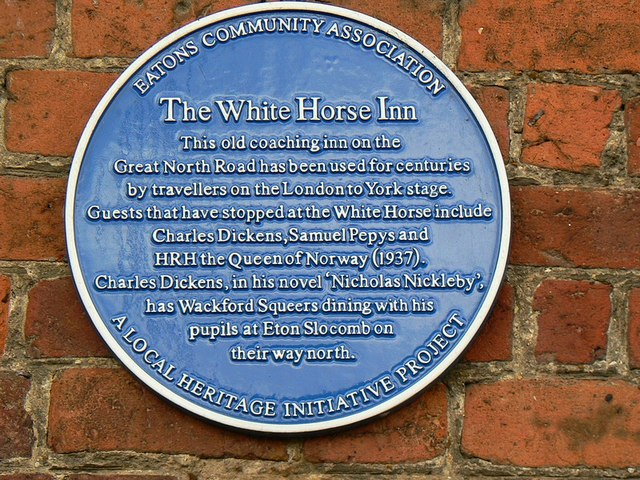
The blue plaque on the White Horse Inn

In Dickens' novel Nicolas Nickleby, Squeers and some boys are making their way from London to Yorkshire by stagecoach. They stop at a place named Eton Slocomb, evidently a pseudonym for Eaton Socon:

So the day wore on. At Eton Slocomb there was a coach dinner of which the box, the four front outsides, the one inside, Nicholas, the good-tempered man, and Mr. Squeers partook; while the five little boys were put to thaw by the fire, and regaled with sandwiches.

The reference is noted on a blue plaque on the White Horse Public House in Eaton Socon, although there is no presumption that this where Squeers dined.

=== The Great North Road in 1794 ===
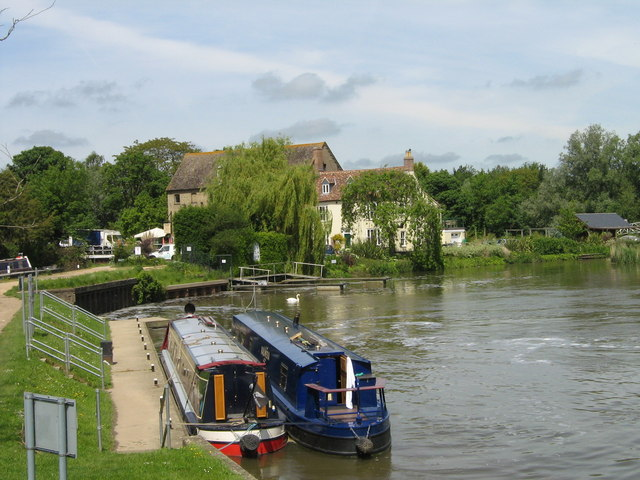
Eaton Socon Lock and the River Mill public house

John Byng travelled in the county and wrote a description of his travels:

Sandy Field exhibits the same shew of fertility; To the right, upon the hill, amidst woods, stands the new built seat of Mr. Pym; to the left, over the river, the village of Blunham, the beautiful steeple of its church, and the pretty house of Mrs. C---. At mile 51 you enter Tempsford village -- a little thoroughfare; at the end of which are the grounds and house of Sr. G. P. close to the road, foams the wide River Ouse -- now joined by the Ivell.-- As at Sandy there is a Roman, so here is a Danish camp) The village of Wroxston is on the other side of the river; to which there is a Ford passable when the water is down. -- At 52 there is a long bridge over the River Ouze (an excellent spot for fishing) -- At 53 you come to Wyberson village--; Colmworth Church looks loftily to the left. To the right over the river is seen the church of Little Barford, at 54 you pass by a range of houses called Little End.-- At 55 you enter the large village of Eaton; where are several inns, one, The Cock, much frequented by fox hunters, and a noble church.

From the hill above Eaton there is a view of the large market turn of St. Neots in the vale of which join'd to Eynesbury village makes a great shew: St. Neots Church and steeple, are much admired.-- At Cross Hall, a pretty spot where there is a good public house, The Ram, with a grove of trees, you quit Bedfordshire. At 57 pass the end of Little Paxton village. The high road being adorn'd by the two good houses of Mr Reynolds and Mr Alexander page.

=== Impact of railways ===
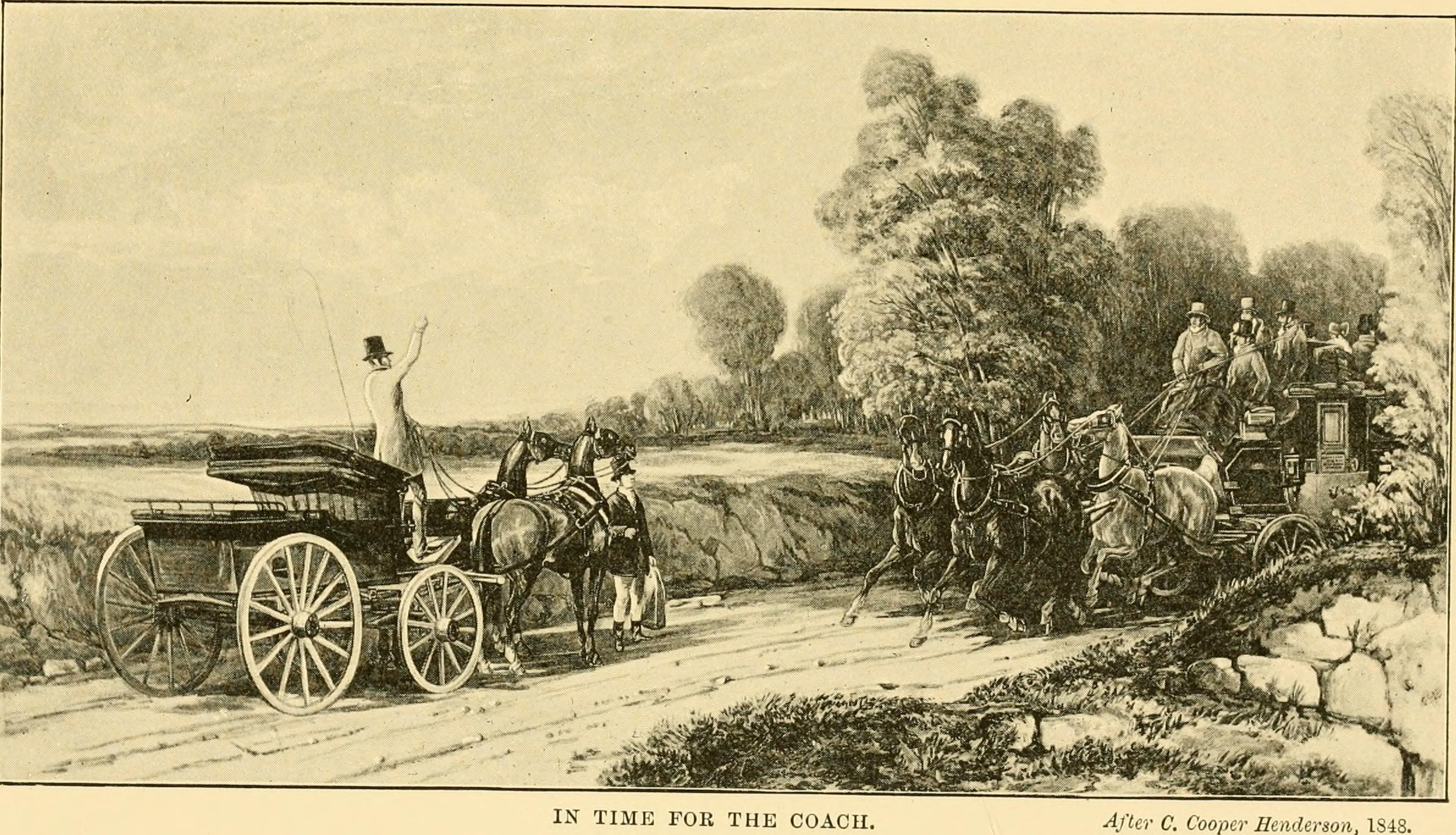
Stage-coach and mail in days of yore

On 7 August 1850, a railway opened to the public through St Neots: the Great Northern Railway opened its line from a temporary station in London, Maiden Lane, to Peterborough. In succeeding years the company opened throughout from Kings Cross to Doncaster, and railway main lines and branches proliferated.

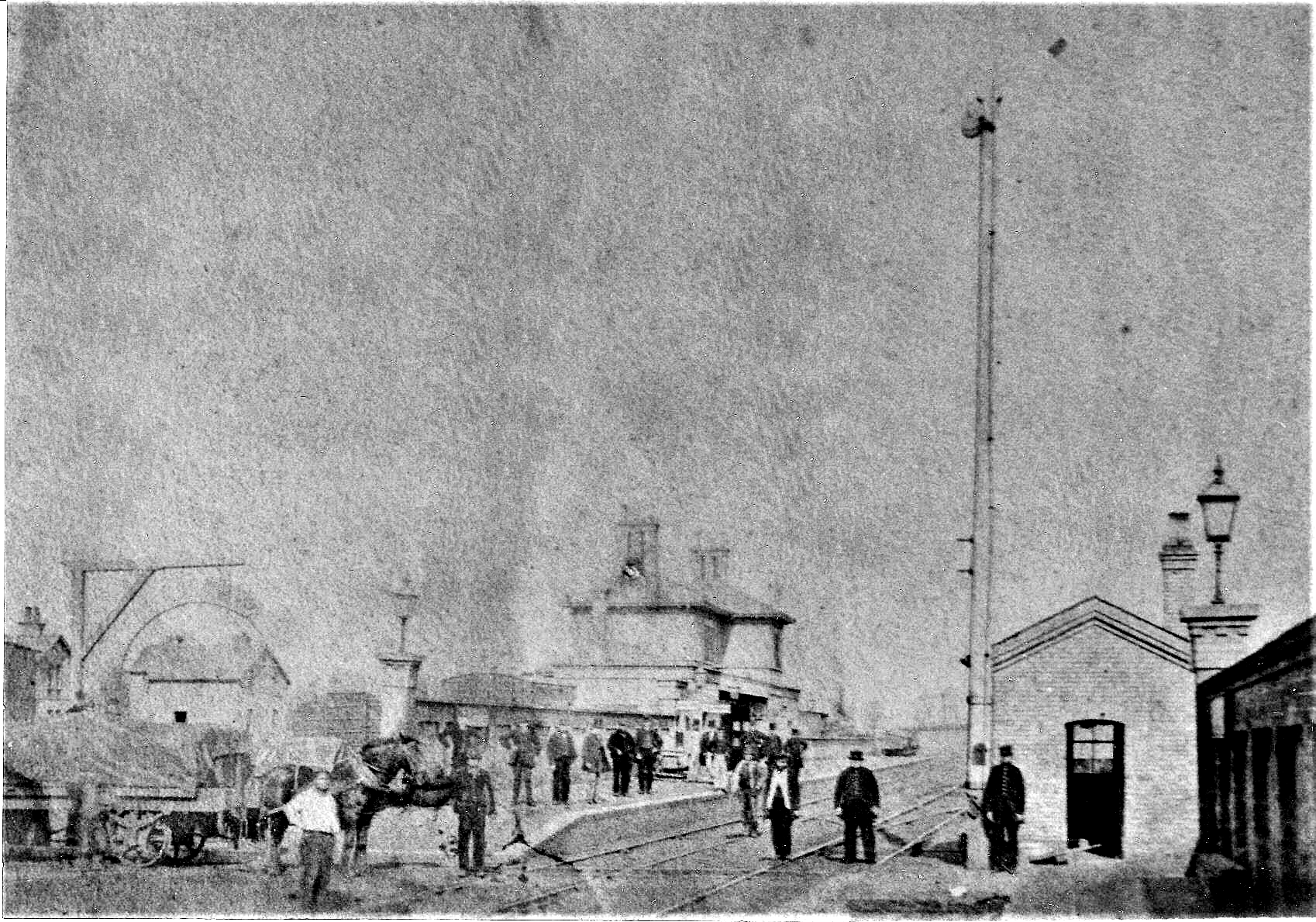
St Neots station in 1850 improived

At St Neots the route taken by the railway lay well to the east of the town, farthest away from the river and from Eaton Socon. The railway enabled the transport of goods and minerals: manufactured goods outward, and heavy commodities inward: coal, lime for improving soil, and cattle feed. Coal in particular: the price of coal often reduced by 80% the day after a town acquired a railway connection. In addition the railway enabled passenger travel in general, and for the first time people of all classes were able to travel, and cheap excursions to seaside resorts were arranged, as well as to the Great Exhibition of 1851.

Unfortunately for Eaton Socon, the rise of the railways led to the extinction of the stagecoach trade that had brought so much prosperity to the area. Long distance stagecoach travel was quickly wiped out, and stagecoach operators ran nothing more than feeder services. Moreover, the river traffic too declined steeply; Bedford and St Neots merchants and farmers no longer required river transport for their materials, and employment on the water too was greatly reduced.

Eaton Socon had little industry to fall back on, and from this time it declined. Employment was limited to agriculture, and to the industrial work available in St Neots.

The village has a conservation area centred on listed buildings including modest thatched cottages along the Great North Road and side roads such as Peppercorns Lane and School Lane.

== Post-war development ==
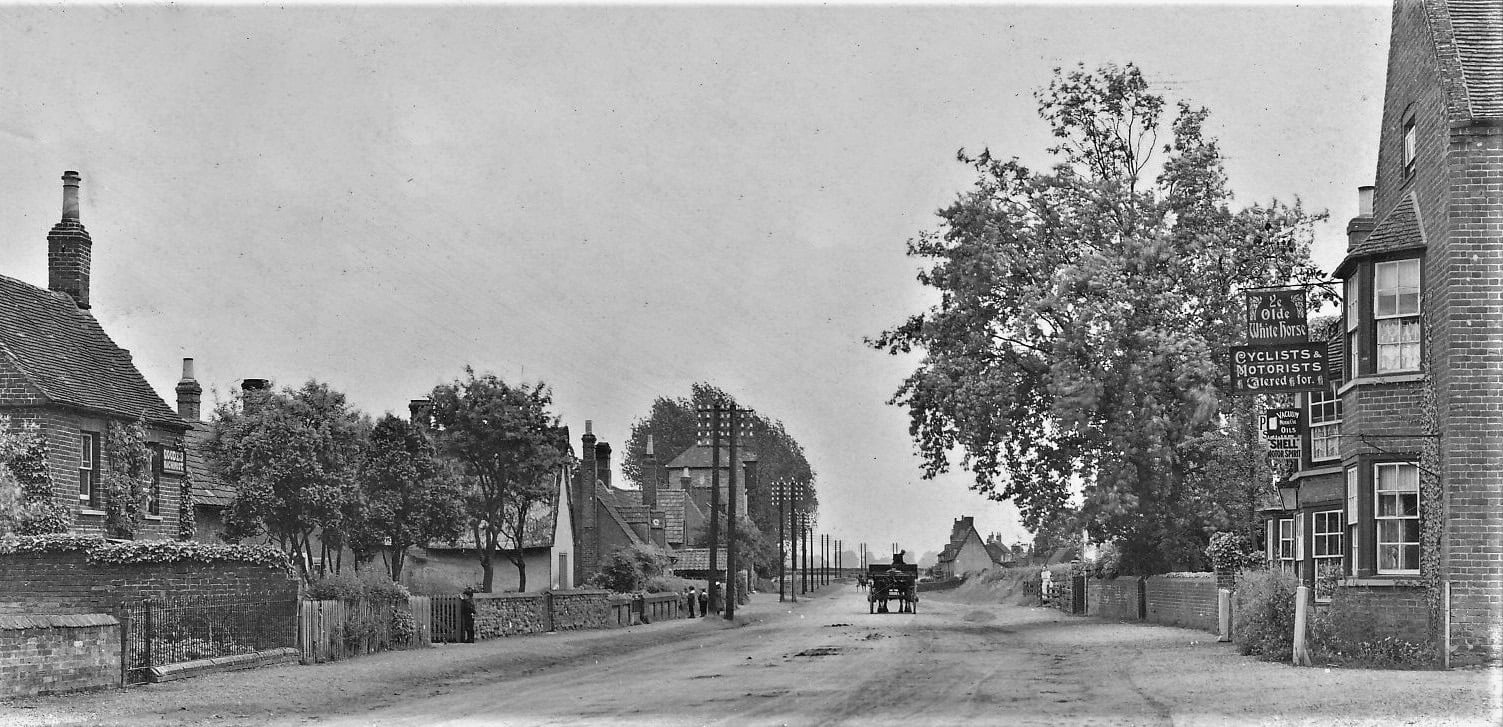
Eaton Socon looking South past the White Horse

The population of Eaton Socon remained without much change until the late 1950s. At this time the Government were concerned about overcrowding and poor accommodation in London, and a number of initiatives grouped under the name London overspill was implemented. Large-scale increase in housing was planned in Eaton Socon, and this was followed by further schemes in later decades. This resulted in most of the land between the Great North Road and the A1 being infilled. The development was not limited to housing, but included light industry, which was established at first on the Little End estate, and later elsewhere in Eaton Socon.

Following the enactment of the Education Act 1944, there was a great expansion in secondary education for all pupils. It was not until 1960 that a secondary school was established in St Neots, but Eaton Socon was in Bedfordshire, so a number of Eaton Socon pupils travelled daily to Biggleswade. It was only with the establishment of Longsands and Ernulf comprehensive schools in 1966 and 1971 that a full secondary education provision was made in St. Neots.

On 1 April 1965, Huntingdonshire was combined with the Soke of Peterborough to form an enlarged county, named Huntingdonshire and the Soke of Peterborough. Eaton Socon was still in Bedfordshire. In 1974 Huntingdonshire and the Soke of Peterborough were finally merged with Cambridgeshire and the Isle of Ely, the entire new county being known as Cambridgeshire. Eaton Socon and Eaton Ford were transferred to Cambridgeshire and Huntingdon District Council, and a St Neots Town Council was set up. Huntingdon District Council later changed its name to Huntingdonshire District Council.

== St Mary's church ==
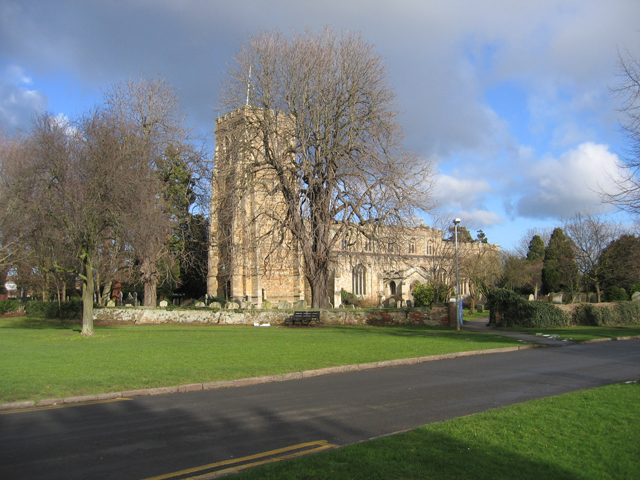
St Mary's church, Eaton Socon

St Mary's church is the parish church of Eaton Socon. (Note: Both St Neots parish church and Eynesbury parish church are also dedicated to St Mary.) The dedication is to Saint Mary the Virgin. Although the church is now in Cambridgeshire, much of the parish is in Bedfordshire.

On the evening of 8 February 1930 the church was substantially destroyed by a fire. By the time it was discovered it had already taken hold, and despite the attendance of Sandy and St Neots fire appliances, most of the timber and other flammable parts of the church were destroyed, as also was one of the bells. The vicar managed to save some of the historic documents and artefacts. In the early afternoon of the following day, the north wall collapsed. An investigation revealed that there had been a defective flue from the stove under the organ chamber. Timber panelling was ignited, and the fire took hold as a result.

The decision was taken to rebuild, and Prof A E Richardson, FRIBA, was appointed consulting architect. The rebuilt church was to be broadly faithful to the original, although detailed photographs proved not to be available. The restoration of the tower was undertaken first, and reinforced concrete was used for strength, and Mr Hartrop, a builder from Eaton Socon, was the contractor, and much other work was done by local people. A new altar was made from a slab of Derbyshire stone, weighing 12 cwt (600 kg).

In due course eight new bells were cast, in part from the metal of the old bells, but forming two more bells than the six former bells. Sir Edward Elgar was asked to compose a chime for striking the hour, but although he agreed, he seems to have been dilatory. However eventually his manuscript was received, but now the Parochial Church Council decided to ask for local compositions. This caused considerable controversy, quite apart from the discourtesy to Elgar, and in fact the chimes composed by S G Wilkinson, the Eaton Socon organist, were used.

Percy Bentham, the stonemason, carved a reference to the conflict in a corbel to the right of the north door: it shows a satyr snatching the pipes from the mouth of a musician.

A statement of expense dated 8 February 1936 shows expenditure of nearly £22,880, of which £18,000 was covered by insurance.

Betjeman later wrote:

Almost completely destroyed by fire in 1930, this church was formerly a 15th-century enlargement and completion of a 14th-century building famed for its poppy headed pew ends. The reconstruction by Richardson, using local craftsman, is excellent. Since the fire swept from the east, the chancel suffered least and although it was gutted its delicate perpendicular windows were reparable.

The architect of the 1930s reconstruction was Albert Richardson and local craftspeople were employed. Much work on the rebuilding of the church was by Percy George Bentham, including "a rood screen, choir benches, parclose screens, roofing, and the organ case, all in Suffolk oak. The stone carving includes many symbolical corbel groups and portraits. Among the faces are those of the Bishop of St. Albans, the Archdeacon of Bedford, the vicar of Eaton Socon, the churchwardens, the architect, the clerk of the works, and the builders' foreman."

== Housing and demography ==
Housing type
| Type | Number | Percentage |
|---|---|---|
| Whole house or bungalow: Detached | 566 | 22.7% |
| Whole house or bungalow: Semi-detached | 788 | 31.7% |
| Whole house or bungalow: Terraced (including end-terrace) | 796 | 32.0% |
| Flat, maisonette or apartment: Purpose-built block of flats or tenement | 290 | 11.7% |

Most, 65.8%, of housing is owned (with/without mortgage); the next largest category is 22.5% which is socially rented, including 5.4% from the district council directly. 1.7% of the 2,489 homes had (in 2011) no usual residents.

== Government ==
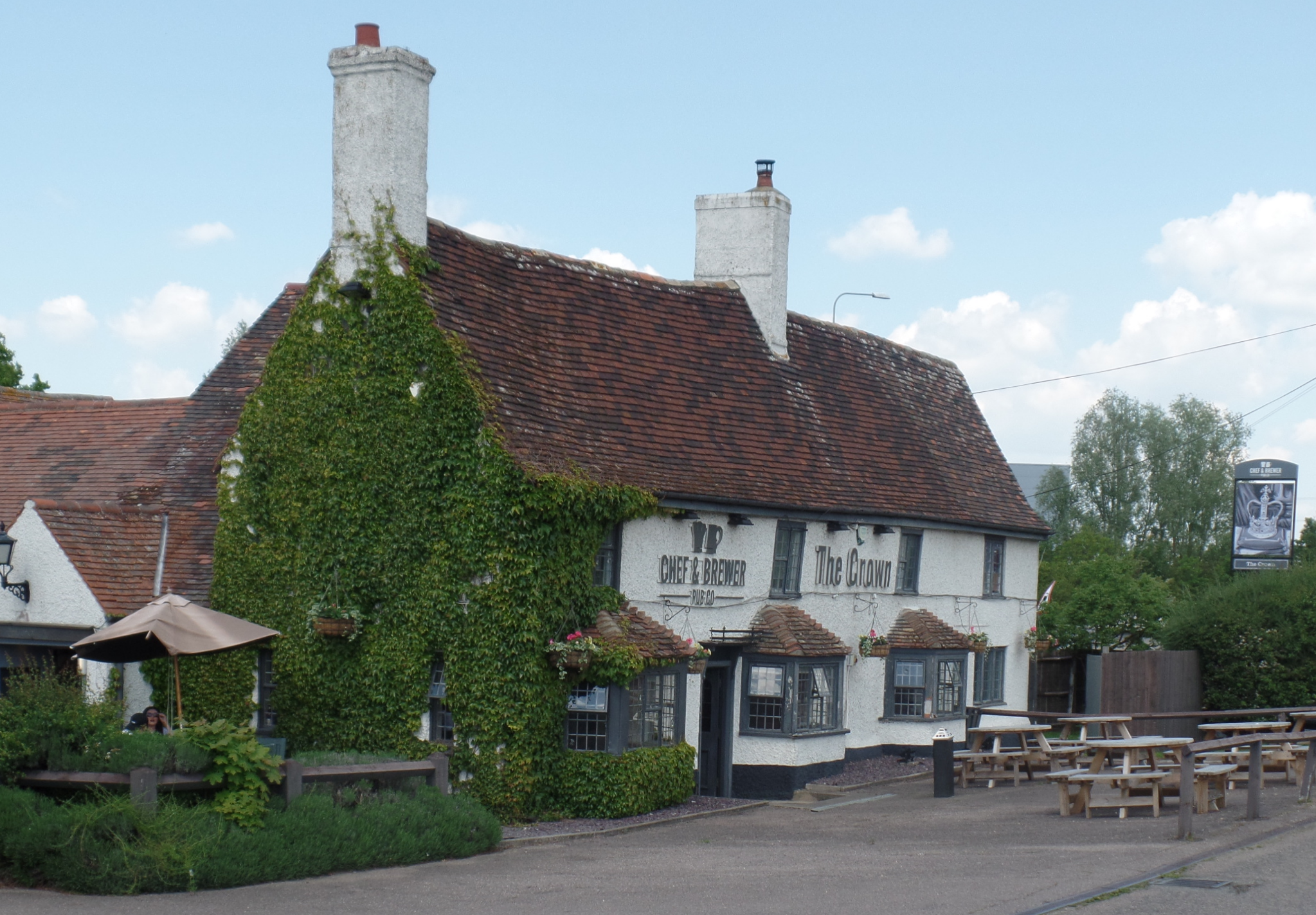
The Crown Inn, Wyboston, Bedfordshire; the Crown is in Wyboston, but is considered to be within the St Neots conurbation

Huntingdonshire District Council, based in Huntingdon, is responsible for most local affairs below County Council level. It collects council tax and administers building regulations, planning and environmental approvals, day centres, assessed housing benefits, parks, refuse collection, a communal leisure budget and supports tourism. District councillors serve four-year terms.

The next tier of local government is Cambridgeshire County Council, headquartered in Cambridge. This provides county-wide services in road infrastructure, fire and rescue, education, social services, libraries and heritage. Eaton Socon is in the electoral division St Neots, Eaton Socon and Eynesbury, with two councillors.

Eaton Socon is in the Huntingdon Parliamentary constituency, and is represented in the House of Commons by Ben Obese-Jecty, (Conservative).

In 1961 the parish had a population of 3264. On 1 April 1965 the parish was abolished and merged with St Neots, parts also went to Staploe and Roxton.
