= Wintringham =

New village in Cambridgeshire, England

Coordinates: 52.22512°N 0.24113°W

- Location within Cambridgeshire
- OS grid reference: TL201600
- Civil parish: St Neots
- District: Huntingdonshire
- Shire county: Cambridgeshire
- Region: East
- Country: England
- Sovereign state: United Kingdom
- Post town: St Neots
- Postcode district: PE19
- Police: Cambridgeshire
- Fire: Cambridgeshire
- Ambulance: East of England
- UK Parliament: St Neots and Mid Cambridgeshire

Wintringham is a community in the civil parish of St Neots, in the Huntingdonshire district of Cambridgeshire, England.

Wintringham is a phase 2 of Love's Farm, on the north of the community. Wintringham is currently under development. When complete, it is expected to have 2,800 houses.

== History ==
The site of Wintringham previously contained an Iron Age settlement and a Roman burial ground, which were discovered in 2023.

== Education ==
Education is provided by Wintringham Primary Academy, which opened in 2018 on the grounds of the Roundhouse Primary Academy. In November 2020, Wintringham Primary Academy and the Roundhouse Primary Academy switched education complexes, which ment Wintringham Primary went into its new home in Wintringham in that same month, while Roundhouse went into its new home in Love's Farm, and renamed themselves to The Roundhouse Community Primary School.

== Governance ==
Wintringham is in the civil parish of St Neots, with district-level services and administration provided by Huntingdonshire District Council, and county-level services and administration provided by Cambridgeshire County Council. It was represented in parliament as part of the Huntingdon constituency until 2024, and is in the St Neots and Mid Cambridgeshire constituency since 2024.
