= St Neots =

Town in Cambridgeshire, England

Coordinates: 52.228°N 0.270°W

- Town and civil parish
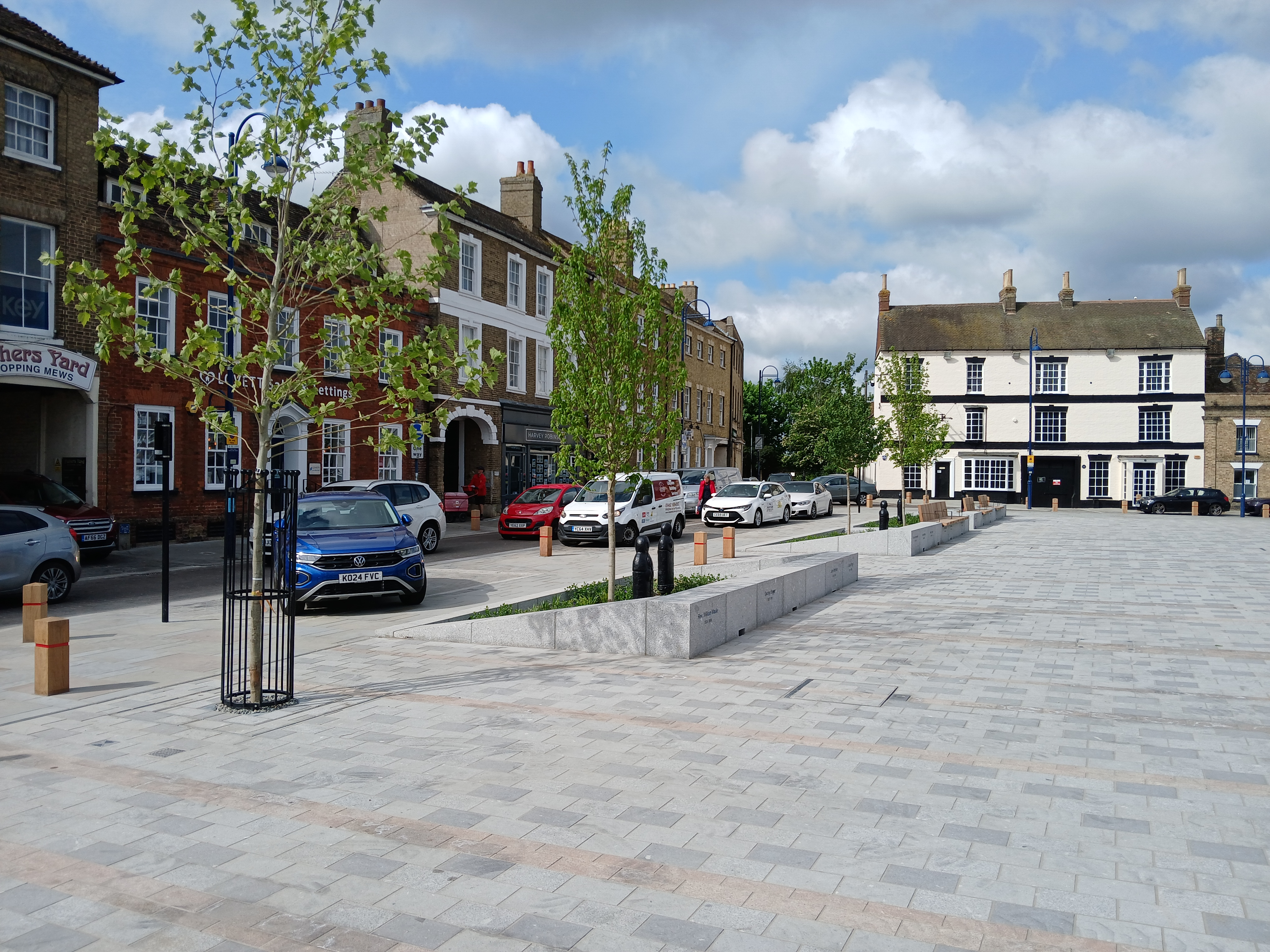
- St Neots Market Square

- Location within Cambridgeshire
- Area: 8.12 km^{2} (3.14 sq mi)
- Population: 33,103 (parish, 2021)
  - Density: 4,077/km^{2} (10,560/sq mi)
- OS grid reference: TL185605
  - London: 49 miles (79 km) S
- Civil parish: St Neots
- District: Huntingdonshire
- Shire county: Cambridgeshire
- Region: East
- Country: England
- Sovereign state: United Kingdom
- Post town: St Neots
- Postcode district: PE19
- Dialling code: 01480
- Police: Cambridgeshire
- Fire: Cambridgeshire
- Ambulance: East of England
- UK Parliament: St Neots and Mid Cambridgeshire

St Neots (/sənt ˈniːəts/) is a town and civil parish in the Huntingdonshire district of Cambridgeshire, England. It is 18 miles (29 km) west of Cambridge. The areas of Eynesbury, Eaton Ford, Eaton Socon, Love's Farm and Wintringham form part of the town.

The town centre lies on the bank of the River Great Ouse close to the A1 road (north-south), as well as the A421 and A428 roads which link Cambridge to Bedford and Milton Keynes. St Neots railway station is on the Great Northern route between London and Peterborough. St Neots parish had a population of 33,103 in 2021, while the built-up area had a population of 33,265.

== Toponymy ==
The town is named after the ninth century monk Saint Neot, whose bones were brought to St Neots Priory from Cornwall around 980 AD, resulting in pilgrims visiting in large numbers. Before the founding of the priory, the area had been part of the parish of Eynesbury. A separate parish called St Neots was created in 1204 covering the town which was growing up around the priory. The two were administratively reunited in 1876 when Eynesbury was absorbed into St Neots.

== History ==
=== Early history ===
Remains of Iron Age settlement have been found in the town centre; a Roman encampment was located in the town. It became known as Eynesbury, after Ernulf, a local leader.

Neot was a holy man who founded a monastery near the present-day Cornish village of St Neot. When he died, his remains were kept there as holy relics, and many pilgrims visited, making donations. In the later tenth century a priory was established immediately north of the village of Eynesbury in what is now St Neots. The landowners, Leofric and his wife Leoflaed, obtained Neot's remains (leaving an arm in Cornwall), realising that they would attract pilgrims, and their money, to their priory. This was successful, and the priory became rich and famous, and the area became known as St Neots. St Neots gradually gained its independence as a separate parish from Eynesbury in a process which began sometime after 1113 and was finally completed in 1204. The boundary between the two parishes was a stream called Hen Brook.

About this time, the settlement to the west of the River Ouse was known as Ea-tun, meaning "waterside village". In Norman times, a sub-division of a Baron's area of control was called a "soke" (a district within certain legal privileges could be exercised) and in French the area was called the Soka de Eton, and later Eaton Socon. Before the river was bridged, people waded across it, and this was called a "ford", from which the immediate area became called Eaton Ford.

The priory was destroyed during the dissolution of the monasteries in the 16th century, and the relics of St Neot were lost.

The River Great Ouse was made navigable from St Ives to Bedford, via St Neots, in 1629, increasing river-borne trade in the town.

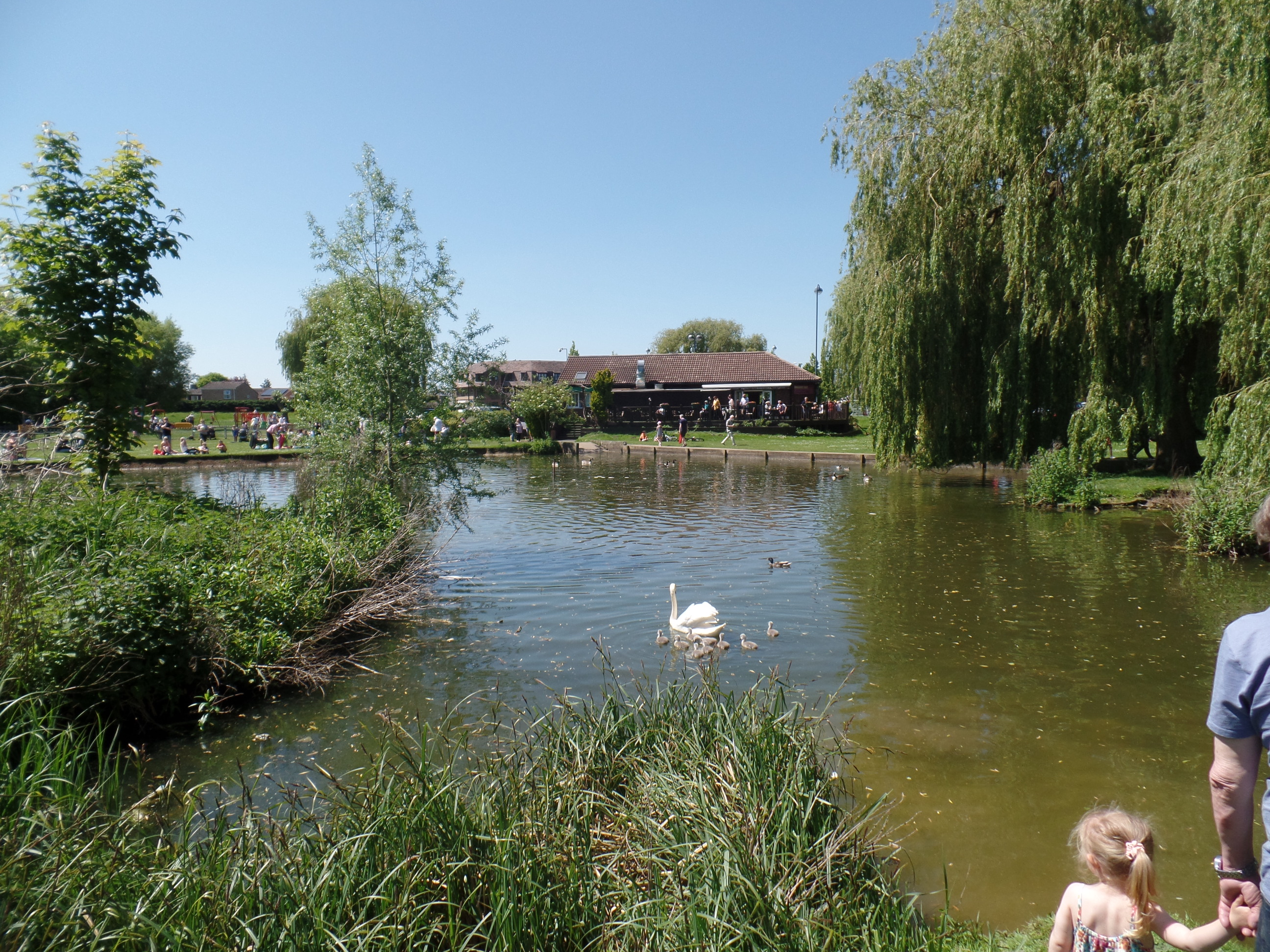
The boating pond at St Neots

The Second English Civil War began in April 1648. The Parliamentarians under Oliver Cromwell were in control, but King Charles I planned to overthrow them by force of arms. An attempt to seize London by his supporters, the Royalists, failed. A group of them retreated to St Neots and planned to spend the night of 9 July resting in the town. In the small hours of 10 July Parliamentary troops attacked, taking them by surprise, and the battle centred on the market square area. Many Royalists were killed or taken prisoner.

=== 1900 onwards ===
In the twentieth century, Eaton Ford and Eaton Socon, lying on the west side of the River Great Ouse, became gradually more integrated with St Neots and Eynesbury. Nevertheless their location to the west of the River Great Ouse meant that they were administratively part of Bedfordshire. This anomaly was resolved in 1965 when they were incorporated into the urban district of St Neots. A considerable addition to the population took place in the 1960s when London overspill development took place in the area. This incorporated a great deal of light industry, and Cromwell Road was constructed and became a focus for it. At this time the A45(T) road ran through the town and the construction of St Neots by-pass in 1968 provided a much-needed relief, as well as enhancing access to additional light industry.

Recent developments in St Neots have expanded the population in the last few years: to the east of the railway station is the Love's Farm estate, where more than 1,000 houses were built in the period to 2020. Stage one of the extensive Wintringham estate has been completed but much remains to be done. planned to be a vibrant community with 2,000 homes, To the east of Love's Farm, further development has been started for the construction of the Monkfields Estate.

== Culture and community ==
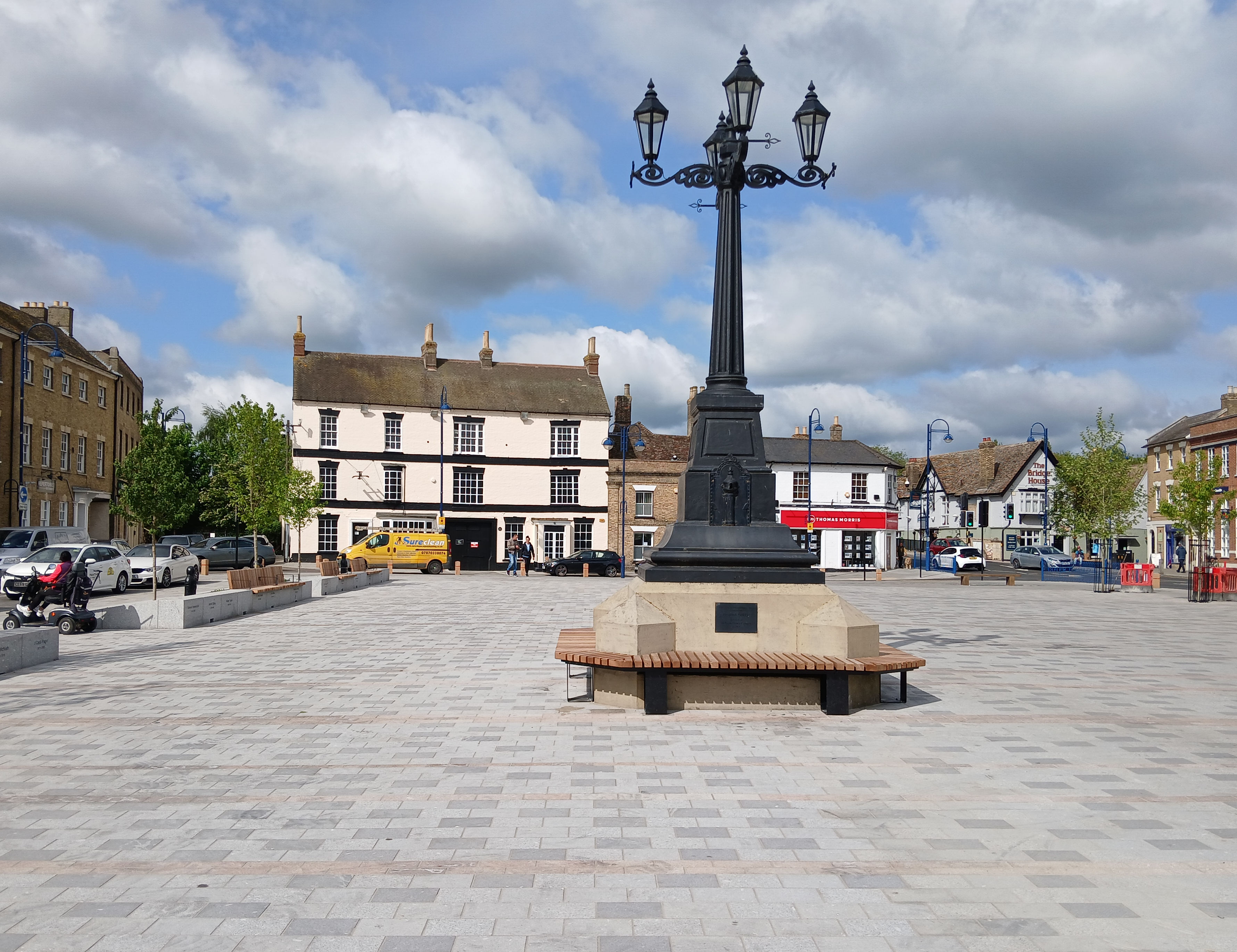
St Neots Market Square

St Neots Museum is housed in the town's former Victorian Police Station and Magistrates Court. It has local history collections covering the town's rich past including a display about James Toller, the Eynesbury Giant, a resident from the 18th century who measured over 8 ft (2.4 m) in height. There is also a gallery with temporary exhibitions by local creatives including fine art, ceramics, sculpture and illustration. The museum organises a variety of specialist and family events from walks, talks, one-day festivals, temporary and touring exhibitions.

St Neots general market is held on the market square every Thursday. A further farmers market is held on the market square every second and fourth Saturday.

The theatre community includes the Riverside Theatre Company, who stage productions, run workshops and have groups for all ages; VAMPS formed in 1961 as the St Neots and District Operatic Society and stage popular musicals and variety shows; St Neots Players, formed in the late 1920s as a play-reading group with past members who used to perform the annual Shakespeare, Pantomime and other mid-season productions at the Kings Head Hotel in the Stables Theatre.

The local creative community is served by Neotists, a community interest company for creative professionals with members covering design, illustration, art, photography and IT, which commissions local creatives to collaborate on projects, run workshops and events for the community and provide opportunities and connections for professionals working in the creative industry. In 2023, the Neotists organised the St Neots Festival, a music and performing arts festival in Priory Park.

== Governance ==
There are three tiers of local government covering St Neots, at civil parish (town), district, and county level: St Neots Town Council, Huntingdonshire District Council and Cambridgeshire County Council. The district and county councils also form part of the Cambridgeshire and Peterborough Combined Authority, led by the Mayor of Cambridgeshire and Peterborough.

=== Town Council ===
St Neots Town Council
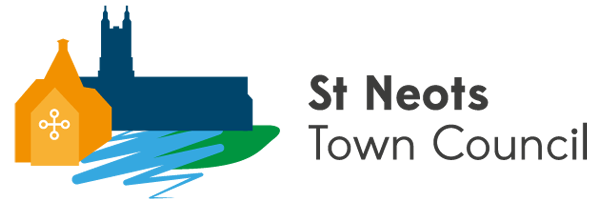

Type
- Type: Town Council

Leadership
- Mayor: Richard Slade
- Town clerk: Chris Robson
- Seats: 21 Councillors

Elections
- Voting system: Plurality-at-large

Meeting place
- Eatons Centre

Website
- stneots-tc.gov.uk

St Neots Town Council is led by a mayor. The council consists of 21 elected councillors, serving eight wards: Eaton Socon, Eaton Ford, Eynesbury, Priory Park, St Neots East, St Neots Crosshall, St Neots Church and Priory Park South. The town council has a budget of £1.97 million in 2025–2026. Responsibilities include allotments, certain buildings, play areas, bus shelters, public toilets, cemeteries, some categories of street lighting, defibrillators, operation of the Priory Centre, youth engagement, and trees, grass and town maintenance.

=== Parliamentary constituency ===
St Neots is in the parliamentary constituency of St Neots and Mid Cambridgeshire. The member of parliament is Ian Sollom of the Liberal Democrats.

== Demographics ==
At the 2021 census, St Neots parish had a population of 33,103. The Office for National Statistics also defined a St Neots "built-up area", which includes parts of the adjacent parish of Wyboston, Chawston and Colesden adjacent to the town, and which had a population of 33,265.

Census population of St Neots parish
Census	Population	Female	Male	Households	Source
1801	1,752				
1811	1,988				
1821	2,272				
1831	2,617				
1841	3,123				
1851	3,157				
1861	3,321				
1871	3,200				
1881	3,136				
1891	2,962				
1901	2,789				
1911	4,171				
1921	4,110				
1931	4,314				
1951	4,700				
1961	5,554				
1971	15,204				
1981	21,290				
1991	24,529				
2001	26,356	13,371	12,985	10,868	
2011	31,165	15,632	15,533	13,148	
2021	33,103	16,785	16,318	14,367	

== Expansion and improvements ==
=== Housing expansion ===
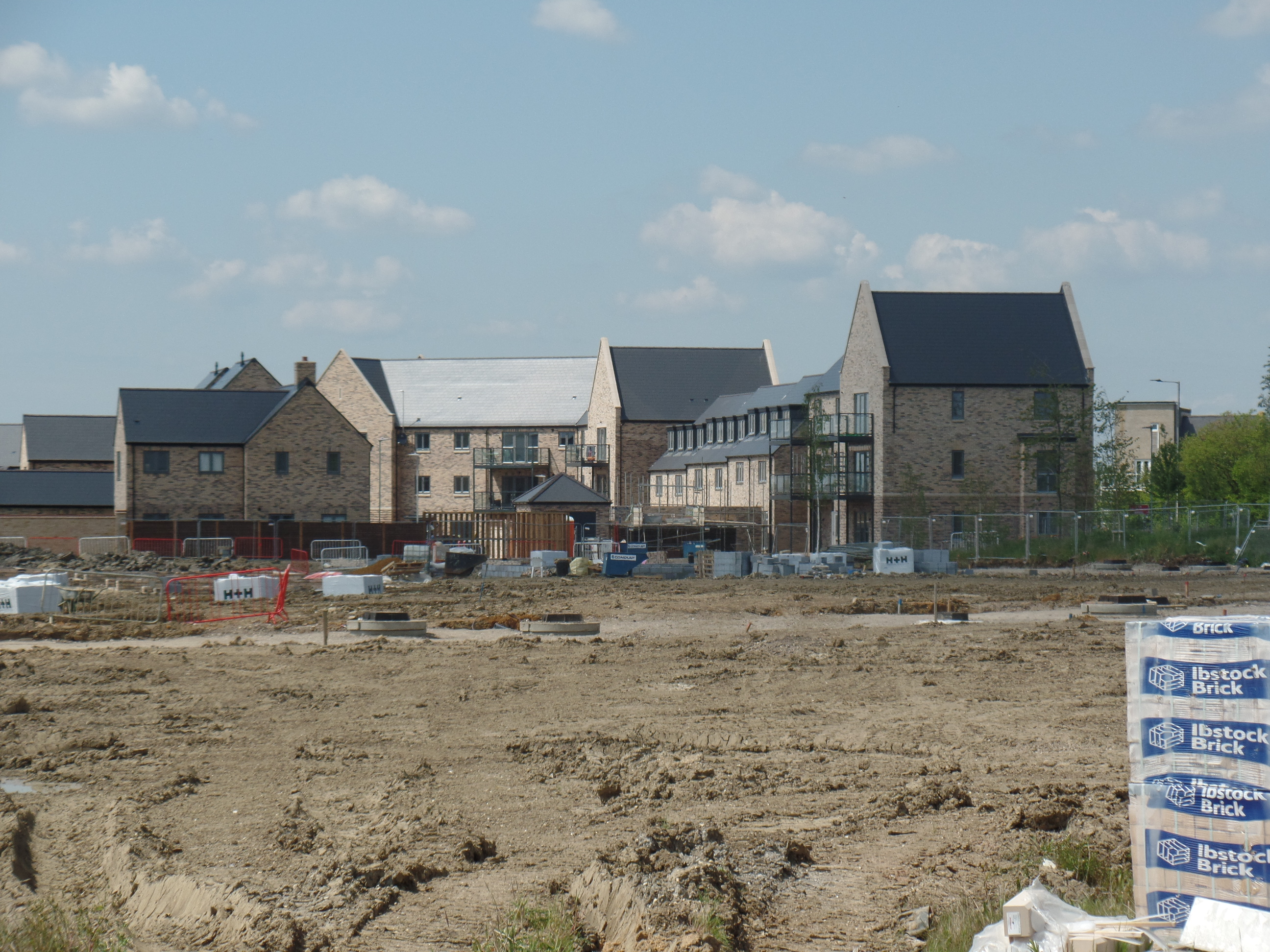
Housebuilding in progress, Wintringham, St Neots

St Neots experienced considerable growth in the late 1960s and later, when much new housing was built to accommodate families from London, as part of the London overspill plan. Further housebuilding followed and during the 1970s industrial development took place along Cromwell Road, Station Road, and the Little End development.

Following the 1985 opening of the St Neots By-Pass (later part of the A428 road), further light industrial development took place alongside Barford Road south of the by-pass.

in 2010, the Loves Farm development was built, with 1,400 houses to the east of the railway line; further construction is continued further east in 2020–2023, This was followed by a further 2,800 houses in 2021 in phase 1 of the Wintringham development, south of Cambridge Road and east of the railway line. Expansion of light industry facilities was incorporated in the original overspill planning, and has also been continued more recently. Housing construction in Phase 1 is substantially complete and an Academy school has been provided. Additional works are planned to provide office space and shop units, as well as a large (21,500 sq ft) food store.

In late 2025 phase 2 of the Wintringham scheme is planned to start, extending further south from phase 1. This will provide about 900 homes and a primary school and ancillary facilities. Phase 3 will be built later, extending further south to reach the A428 by-pass road.

=== Town centre improvements ===
A multi-million pound renovation of St Neots town centre began in January 2024 and is due to finish in early summer 2025. The town's Market Square is being cleared of obstruction and expanded, with car parking removed and new disabled spaces, landscaping, and a community space is being created. There have been improvements to Huntingdon Street crossroads and Church Walk crossing, as well as the resurfacing of the carriageway along the High Street and New Street.

Footway paving has also been carried out on the river bridge, along with the installation of a new electrical system in the Market Square, which will continue to be used for markets and events.

In an initiative to improve the safety of pedestrians and cyclists, many of the subsidiary roads were subjected to a 20 mph (32 km/h) speed limit.

== Sport and leisure ==
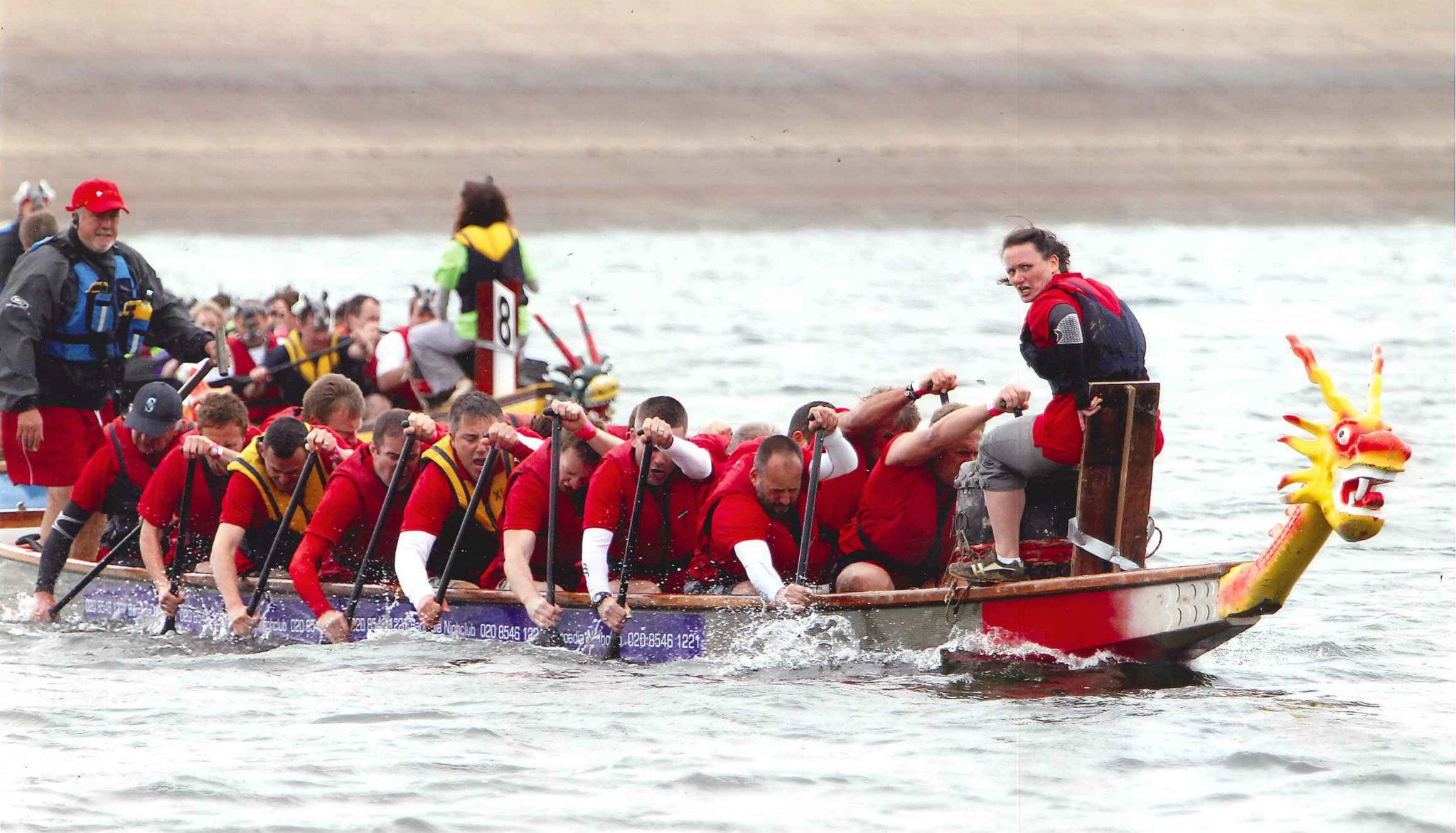
Dragonboat racing

St Neots has a semi-professional non-League football team, St Neots Town F.C., who play at Rowley Park Stadium. The club are currently members of the United Counties League Premier Division South. They play at Premier Plus Stadium, Kester Way.

The town also has a rugby club, St Neots RUFC, a rowing club, St Neots Rowing Club, two Dragon Boat teams and St Neots Table Tennis club.

Huntingdonshire District Council operates a leisure centre complex in Eynesbury with an indoor swimming pool, gym, squash courts, sports hall, tennis courts, all weather pitches, creche, and café. The site is part of the council's 'One Leisure' brand, which has other sites in Huntingdon and St Ives.

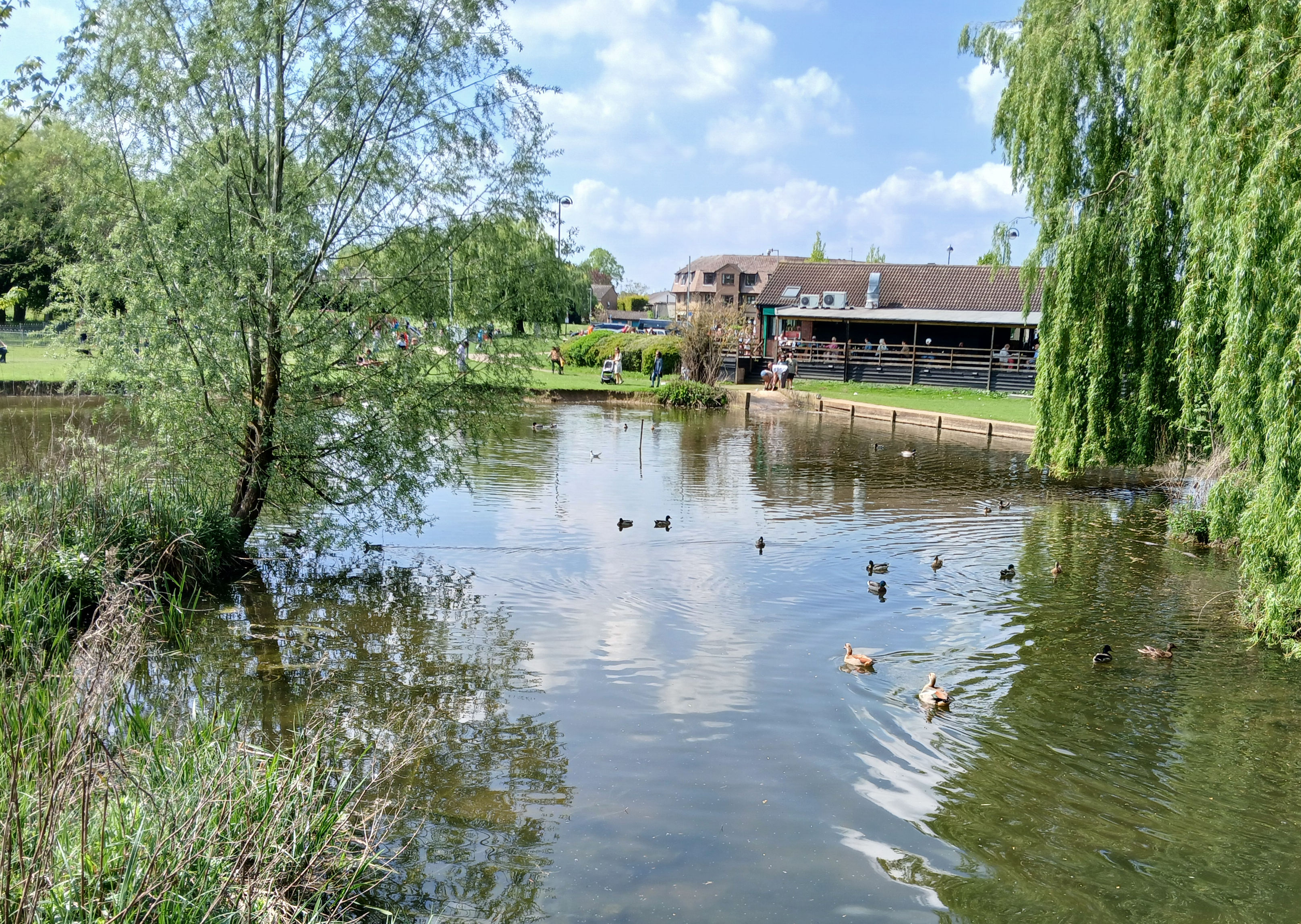
The duck pond and the Ambiance Café in the Riverside Fields, St Neots

Riverside Park is an attractive public green space alongside the River Great Ouse, close to the town centre, incorporating Regatta Meadow. Footpaths in the park were upgraded in August 2024 and a wild flower meadow has been created in part of the area. is close to the town centre and covers 72 acres (29 ha) "with a beautiful mile-long waterside frontage". The park has a café, parking for 250 cars, a large children's activity area, a skate park, and a miniature railway. Riverside Miniature Railway. During the summer concerts are occasionally held on Sunday afternoons in the park.

Barford Road Pocket Park in Eynesbury, hosts weekly parkrun and junior parkrun events.

To the north of the town is Paxton Pits Nature Reserve providing walks through its 190 acres (77 ha) of lakes, meadow, grassland, scrub and woodland. The reserve is famous for its nightingales and cormorants and is home to a wide variety of other birds, insects, mammals and flora.

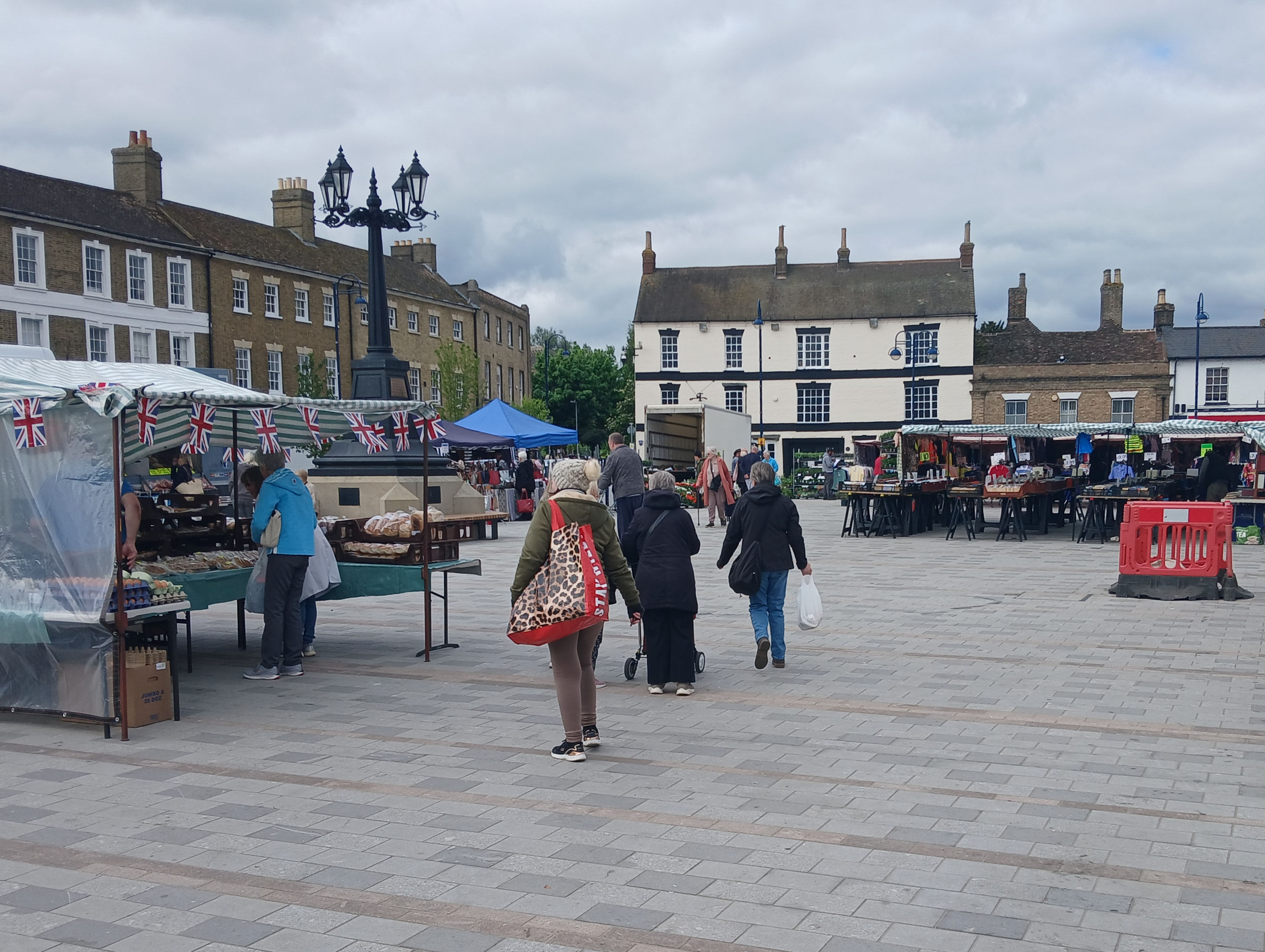
The weekly market at St Neots

The Rowley Arts Centre was opened in May 2014 and includes a six-screen cinema operated by Cineworld and a complex with three restaurants and a gym. It was named after Peter Rowley, an American playwright, author and critic who was Lord of the Manor of St Neots and who donated £1 million towards the development from the profit he made from selling the land on which the Love's Farm development was built. The complex was subsequently purchased as an investment by Huntingdonshire District Council for £7.6 million in 2019.

St Neots has a ten pin bowling centre with 16 lanes, known as Eat N Bowl.

There are two golf courses: St Neots Golf Club and Wyboston Lakes.

== Churches ==
=== St Neots Parish Church ===
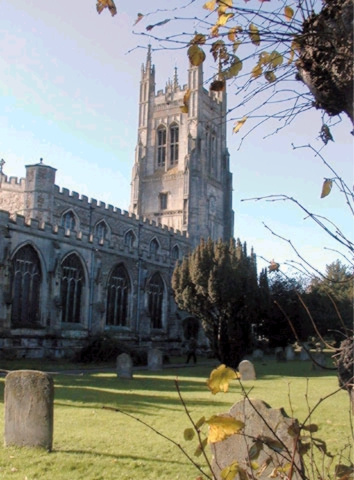
St Neots Parish Church

The parish church of St Neots itself is dedicated to St Mary the Virgin and is part of the Diocese of Ely.

The late 12th-century parish church was almost completely rebuilt in the 15th century, making it one of the largest and grandest medieval churches in modern Cambridgeshire. In the 19th century, it was provided with a high quality set of stained glass windows depicting the life of Jesus Christ. It is considered to be a very fine building, and has been called the Cathedral of Huntingdonshire.

Writing originally in 1958, before the enlargement of the town and the reconstruction of the bridge, John Betjeman said:

"The good small market community has a medieval bridge over the Ouse and a well-proportioned Market Square, but the church is tucked away on the fringe of the town. It is almost everything a good town church should be: a luxurious Perpendicular building with perhaps the finest tower in the county, faced in ironstone and pebbles with ashlar dressings – an agreeable contrast in colour and texture. The roof is almost flat – although not over-elaborate it is very English and most satisfying. There are several Perpendicular screens."

=== Other churches ===
There are two other Anglican churches in St Neots, in the formerly independent settlements of Eynesbury and Eaton Socon. Eynesbury and St Neots parishes amalgamated in 2020 forming the Parish of St Neots with Eynesbury. The Eynesbury church is also dedicated to St Mary the Virgin. Unlike the two churches forming the Parish of St Neots with Eynesbury the church in Eaton Socon, also dedicated to St Mary the Virgin, is apart of the Diocese of St Albans and describes itself as an evangelical church.

There is one Roman Catholic church – The Roman Catholic Church of St Joseph's, St Neots.

The largest non-conformist church is the Open Door Church.

== Media ==
Regional news and television programmes are provided by BBC East and ITV Anglia. Television signals are received from the Sandy Heath TV transmitter.

Local radio stations are BBC Radio Cambridgeshire, Heart East, Greatest Hits Radio East, Star Radio, HCR FM and Black Cat Radio, a community based radio station.

The Hunts Post is the town's local weekly newspaper.

== Transport ==
=== Rail ===
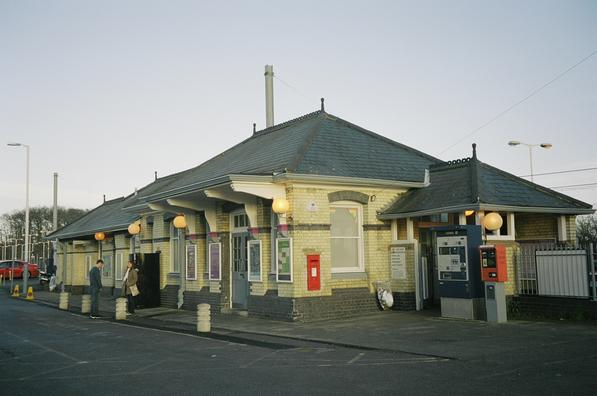
St Neots railway station

St Neots railway station is served by generally half-hourly trains north to Huntingdon and Peterborough, and south to Hitchin, Stevenage and London St Pancras; most trains continue to Gatwick Airport and Horsham. There are additional peak time commuter services in the mornings and evenings to and from London King's Cross. Journeys are typically around 45 minutes to King's Cross, 55 minutes to St Pancras, and about two hours to Gatwick Airport. There were 960,000 uses of the St Neots station in 2023–2024.

East West Rail is a plan to establish a railway between Oxford and Cambridge. Between Oxford and Bedford the route will connect and reopen established sections of route, and is expected to start passenger operation in 2030; extension to Cambridge is intended for 2035. For the time being a service marketed as the Marston Vale Line operates from Bletchley to Bedford. The preferred route between Bedford and Cambridge will pass to the south of the A428 Black Cat roundabout to serve a new station at Tempsford, continuing to Cambourne and Cambridge. There will be no station on the new route at St Neots.

=== Road ===
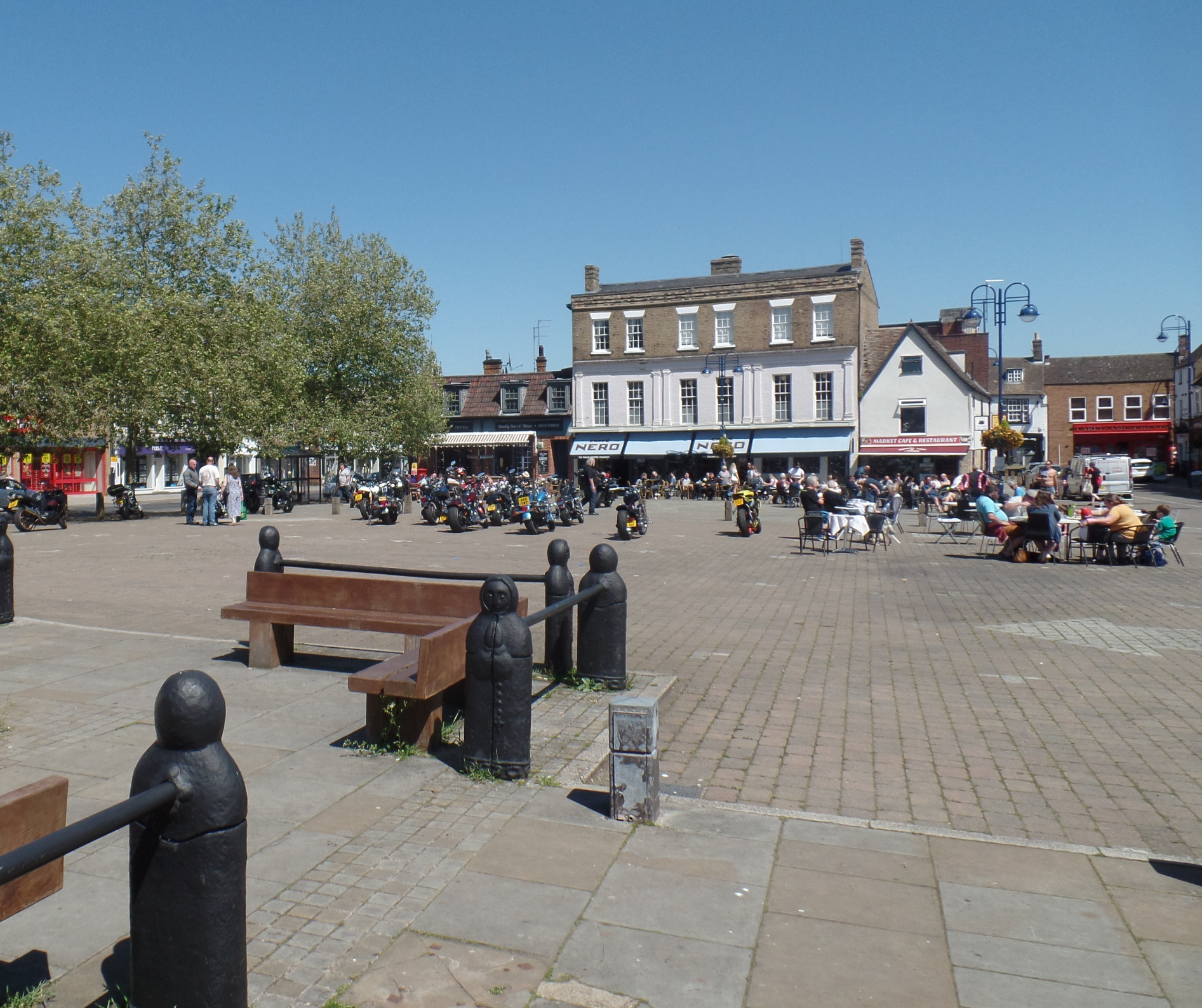
St Neots market square on a sunny Sunday

St Neots lies adjacent to the A1 trunk road which links the town by road with London and the northeast of England and Scotland. The town is also linked with Cambridge to the east by the A428 road and Bedford and Milton Keynes by the A421 road at Black Cat roundabout on the A1 just south of the town.

Six miles to the north the A14 trunk road provides westward and eastward access to the Midlands and East Anglia respectively.

Although outside St Neots and in Bedfordshire, the Black Cat interchange has a significant effect on local road users. It is a road junction between the A1 and A428 roads, and the heavy traffic results in serious congestion at times. A major road scheme is in progress to improve the interchange, forming a grade-separated junction; this will relieve the load on the southern part of St Neots and the A428 bypass. As well as improving the junction, the scheme will provide a new dual carriageway road as far as the Caxton Gibbet roundabout. In addition, minor road connections on the A1 south and north of the Black Cat are bring relocated to provide safer access to the A1. The road scheme is expected to open in 2027.

=== Bus ===
Stagecoach East operate a service to Bedford and Cambridge .

Whippet operates a service between St Neots and Huntingdon, Fenstanton and Hinchingbrooke Hospital;; and to Cambridge via Cambourne, Bourne, Comberton, Barton and Grantchester.

Central Connect operate a circular service from Tesco Extra via the railway station, St Neots Market Square and Eaton Socon. The company also runs a service St Ives, via Papworth and Hilton.

=== Air ===
The nearest airports are Luton and Stansted. There is a direct train service to London Gatwick Airport.

=== Cycling ===
St Neots is on Route 12 of the Sustrans national cycle route that connects Colchester and Oxford via Harwich, Felixstowe, Ipswich, Bury St Edmunds, Cambridge, Huntingdon, Sandy, Bedford and Milton Keynes.

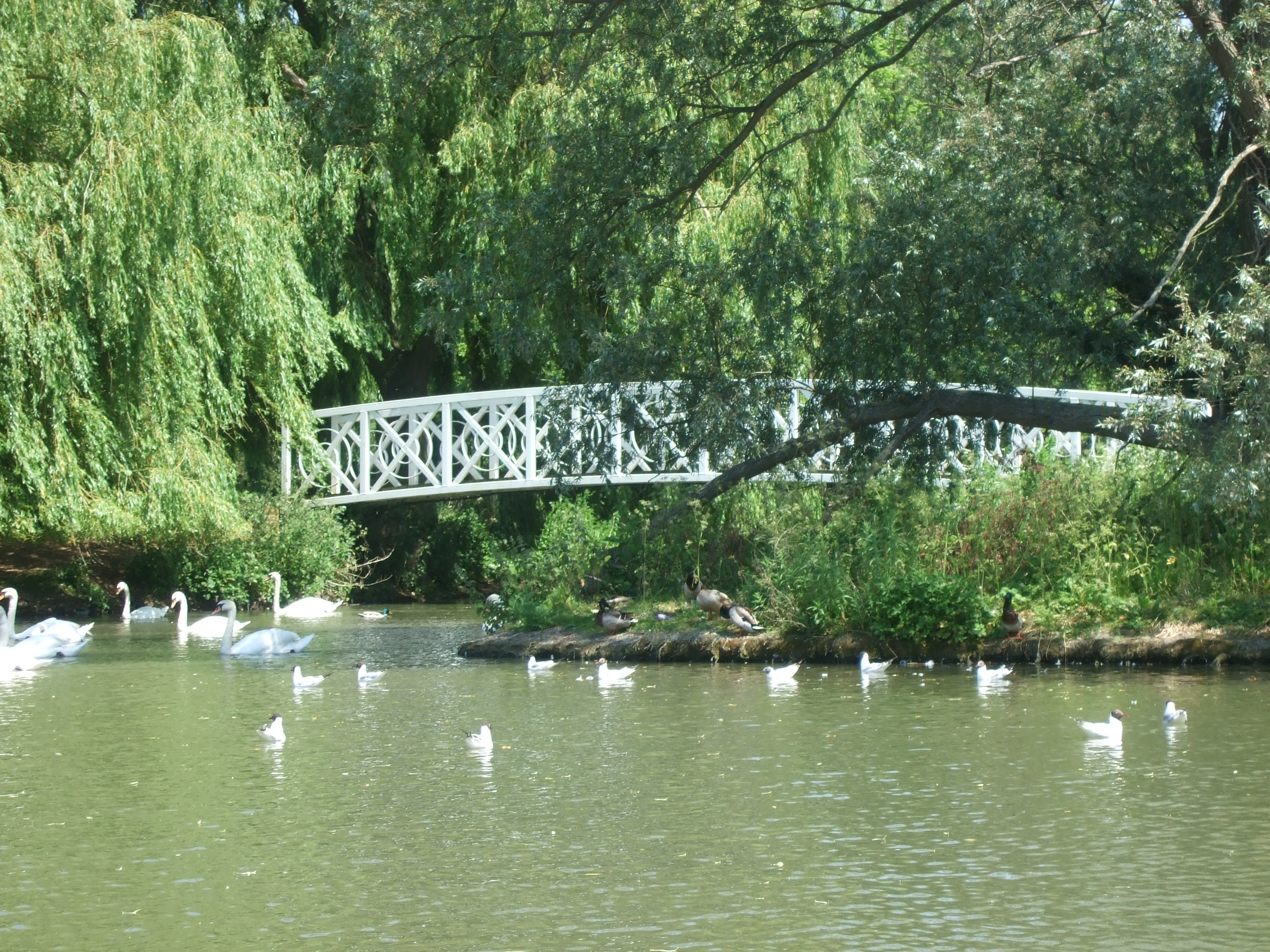
Detail of tree-lined lake with swans in the Riverside Park

A foot and cycle bridge across the River Great Ouse was opened in 2011, linking Eaton Socon and Eynesbury, enabling pupils attending Ernulf Academy to avoid cycling through the town centre and improving connections to existing cycle paths. The scheme was a Sustrans Connect2 project, and supported by Cambridgeshire County Council and Huntingdonshire District Council.

== Geography ==
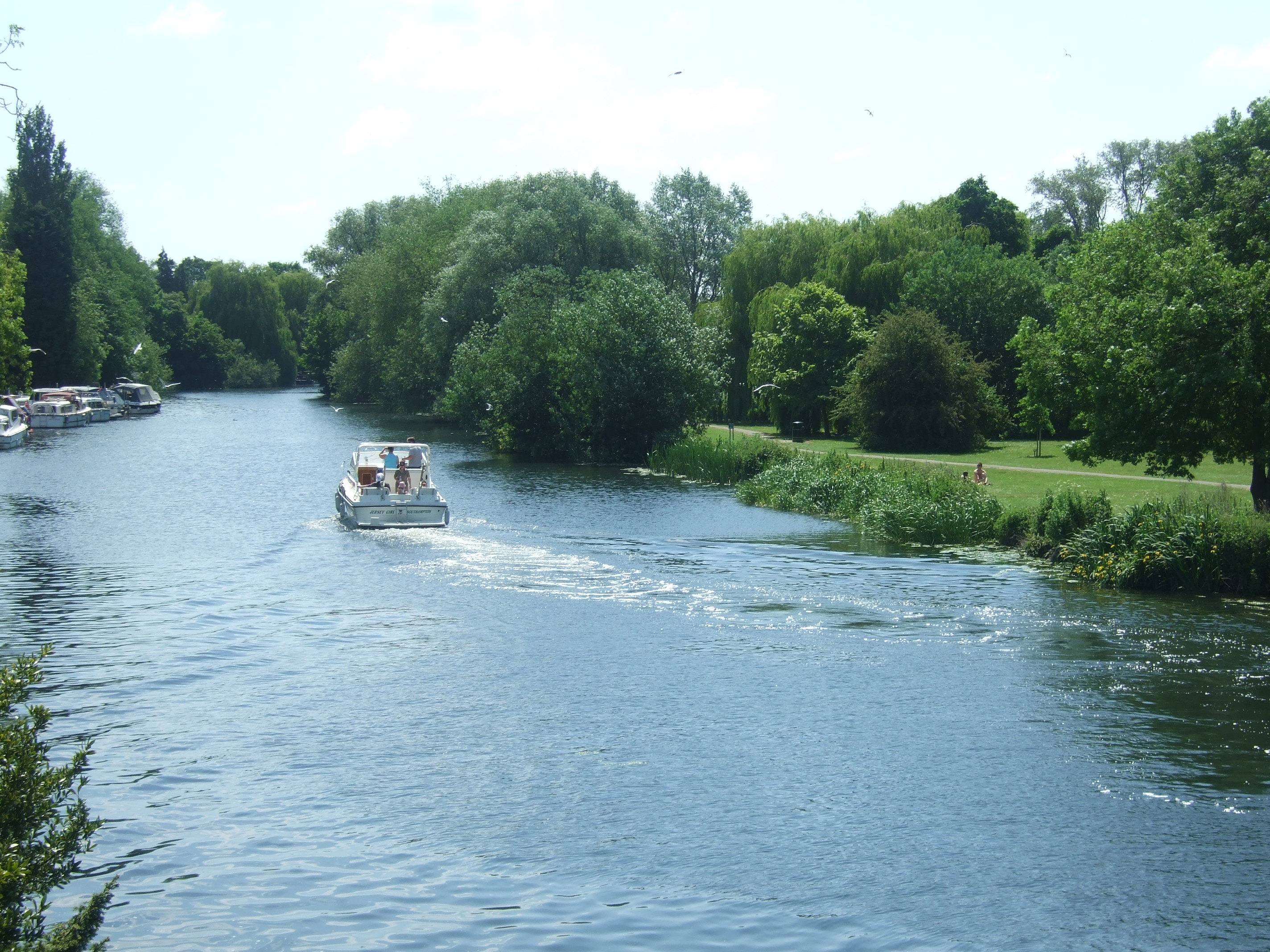
River Great Ouse, St Neots

St Neots is close to the south-western boundary of Huntingdonshire district of Cambridgeshire, and the northern boundary of Bedfordshire. Both Cambridge, about 18 miles (29 km) east, and Bedford, about 13 miles (21 km) south-west, are nearby. Milton Keynes is 31 miles (50 km) to the west and Peterborough is 29 miles (47 km) to the north. The A428 road marks the boundary with Little Barford and Bedfordshire.

St Neots lies in the valley of the River Great Ouse, partly on the flood plain and partly on slightly higher ground. Tributaries entering the Great Ouse in the town are the River Kym, Hen Brook, Duloe Brook and Colmworth Brook. The area is generally low-lying. Riverside Park, an amenity adjacent to St Neots Bridge, remains set aside as a flood-meadow, subject to flood, protecting dwellings and commercial property from a swollen reach.

St Neots developed at the site of a ford where overland routes converged. The Great North Road and the major route from Ipswich to the West Midlands (later the A45 road) intersected at St Neots and Eaton Socon.

The soil is mainly light, overlying gravel beds – gravel extraction is a local industry. Older disused gravel pits, such as the nearby Paxton Pits and Wyboston, have been converted to nature reserves and amenity areas. Away from the river, the higher land is mainly a heavy clay soil with few large settlements. Much of the land is used for arable farming.

=== Climate ===
The climate in the United Kingdom is defined as a temperate oceanic climate, a classification it shares with most of northwest Europe. Eastern areas of the United Kingdom, such as East Anglia, are drier, cooler, less windy and also experience the greatest daily and seasonal temperature variations. Protected from the cool onshore coastal breezes, Cambridgeshire is warm in summer and cold and frosty in winter.

In Saint Neots, the summers are short, comfortable, and partly cloudy and the winters are long, very cold, windy, and mostly cloudy. Over the course of the year, the temperature typically varies from 2 to 22 °C (36 to 72 °F) and is rarely below −3 °C (27 °F) or above 28 °C (82 °F). Rain falls throughout the year. The month with the most rain is October, with an average rainfall of 49 mm (1.9 in). The month with the least rain is March, with an average rainfall of 30 mm (1.2 in).

== Notable residents ==
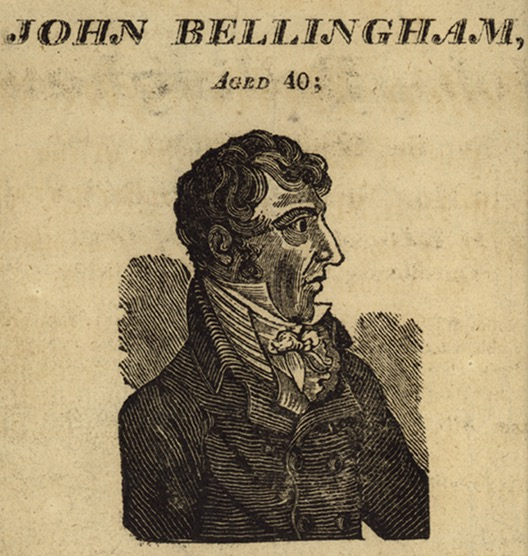
John Bellingham

John Bellingham was born in St Neots; he acquired notoriety as the only person to assassinate a British Prime Minister. Bellingham killed Spencer Perceval at the House of Commons on 11 May 1812. He was hanged for murder a week later.

Winifred Crossley Fair, aviator and one of the First Eight women pilots to join the Air Transport Auxiliary in 1940 during the Second World War, was the first woman to fly a Hurricane fighter.

The St Neots Quads are nicknamed for their place of birth; they were the first British quadruplets to survive more than a few days and as of 2021 were the oldest quadruplets in the world.

Multiple World short course swimming champion Mark Foster lives in St Neots.
