= Eaton Ford =

Village in Cambridgeshire, England

Coordinates: 52.227°N 0.286°W

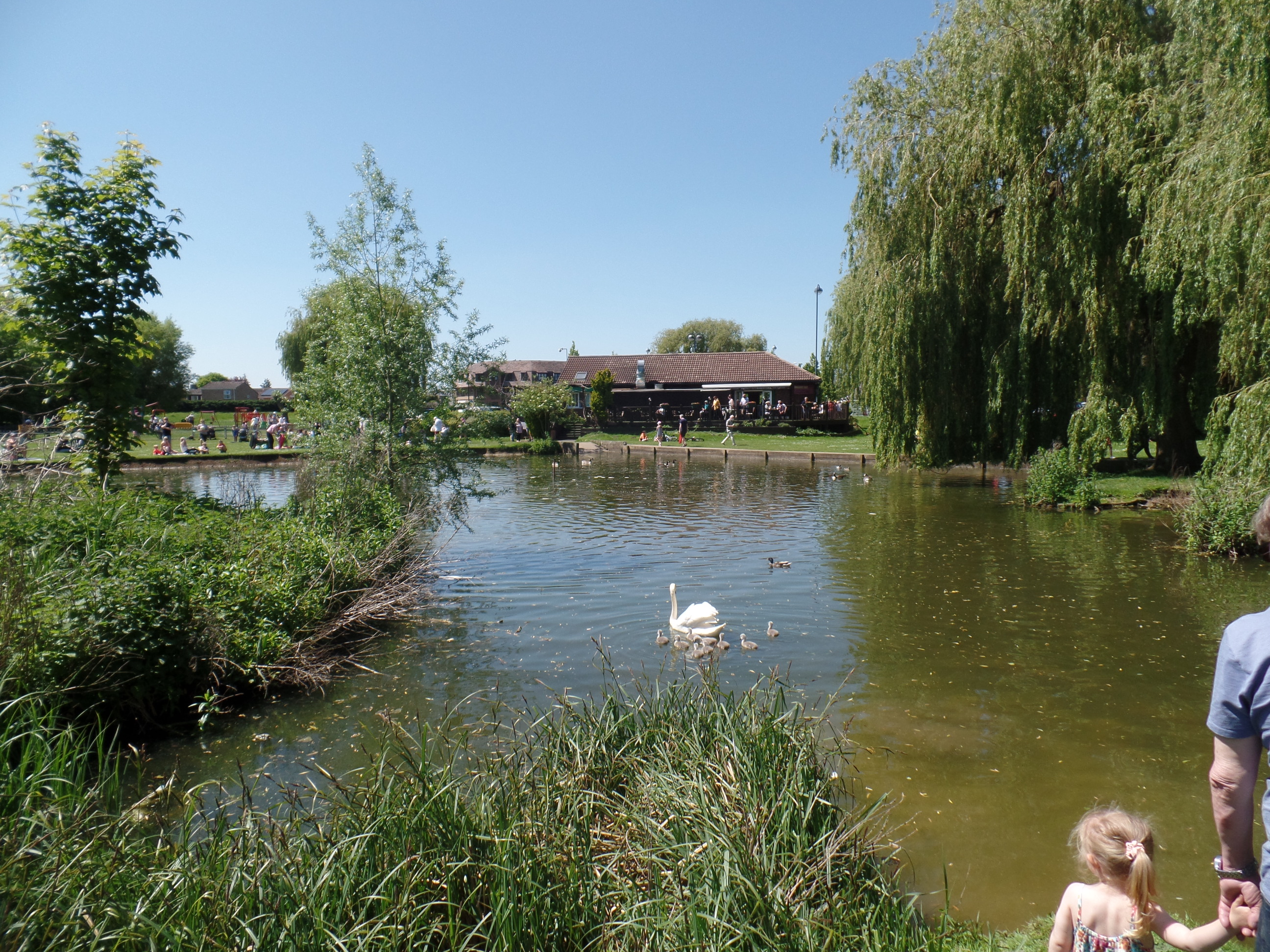
- The pond in Riverside Park, Eaton Ford

- Location within Cambridgeshire
- District: Huntingdonshire
- Shire county: Cambridgeshire
- Region: East
- Country: England
- Sovereign state: United Kingdom
- Post town: ST. NEOTS
- Postcode district: PE19
- Dialling code: 01480
- Police: Cambridgeshire
- Fire: Cambridgeshire
- Ambulance: East of England
- UK Parliament: Huntingdon

Eaton Ford is an area in the civil parish of St Neots, Cambridgeshire, England. It is a mainly residential area also containing Riverside Park, a large area of riverside parkland. Much of the housing stock dates from the period of London overspill during the 1960s and subsequently. The former village green is still in place.

Eaton Ford lies in the area bounded by the River Great Ouse, Duloe Brook in the south, the A1 road to the west, and the River Kym in the north. The small marshy island in the Great Ouse at the confluence of the Kym is included.

Eaton Ford is approximately 81 km (50 mi) north of London. Historically Eaton Ford was in Bedfordshire; it was transferred to Cambridgeshire in 1974.

== Description of Eaton Ford ==
Eaton Ford is a distinct area of St Neots, lying to the west of the River Great Ouse. It is largely residential, but with an extensive area of parkland – Riverside Park – adjacent to the river. There is practically no industrial activity within Eaton Ford, and most people in work travel to other parts of St Neots, or commute further afield.

Eaton Ford Green forms a small but pleasing "village green" focus to the community, and St Neots Town Council arrange to maintain flower beds. Maltman's Green is a grassy area at the junction of St Neots Road and Crosshall Road, but has long since lost its attractiveness to road improvement schemes.

There is a large school complex, Crosshall Junior School on the Great North Road, with considerable pedestrian and vehicular traffic generated at the start and end of the school day. (Despite the historic name, the Great North Road is only a local distributor road here).

St Neots Golf Club is located on Crosshall Road, and the grounds occupy nearly all of the northern part of Eaton Ford up to the River Kym, which forms the boundary. The other occupier of this part of Eaton Ford is a marina, Crosshall Marine Ltd. Its tucked-away location means that it may well be unknown to residents who do not play golf and do not use river craft.

Eaton Ford has a semi-independent convenience store and a public house, the Barley Mow.

The low-lying areas near the river have been subject to flooding, and a flood control scheme has been implemented; the Riverside Park adjacent to The Paddock, the carpark there, and adjacent areas are planned surge containment zones: in times of heavy water flow in the river, these areas are flooded to prevent more serious inundation; flood control banks are provided to protect houses in The Paddock.

== History ==
In Anglo-Saxon times there were small settlements on the west side of the River Great Ouse. A village was formed near the water's edge, probably opposite the Coneygeare, and this was called Ea-tun, meaning waterside-village. Another, smaller settlement a little further north was called Forda, and later simply Ford. A further small settlement was on the hilltop near the present Duloe windmill, and was then called Sudbury, meaning the southern fort.

At that time the River Great Ouse was much wider and shallower than at present, with ill-defined banks. This made fording the river possible with care, and by choosing a dryer period to do so.

Ea-tun came to be known as Eaton, and after the Norman Conquest the more southerly part was designated by the fact that it was part of a soke, a governmental sub-division, and in time this became Eaton Socon. The important Ford in the northern part came to be known as Eaton Ford. There were other places where the Great Ouse could be forded, but this seems to have been the principal crossing place.

The name Eaton Ford was understood casually, but only took formal significance in 1963, when it was separated from Eaton Socon.

== St Neots Priory ==
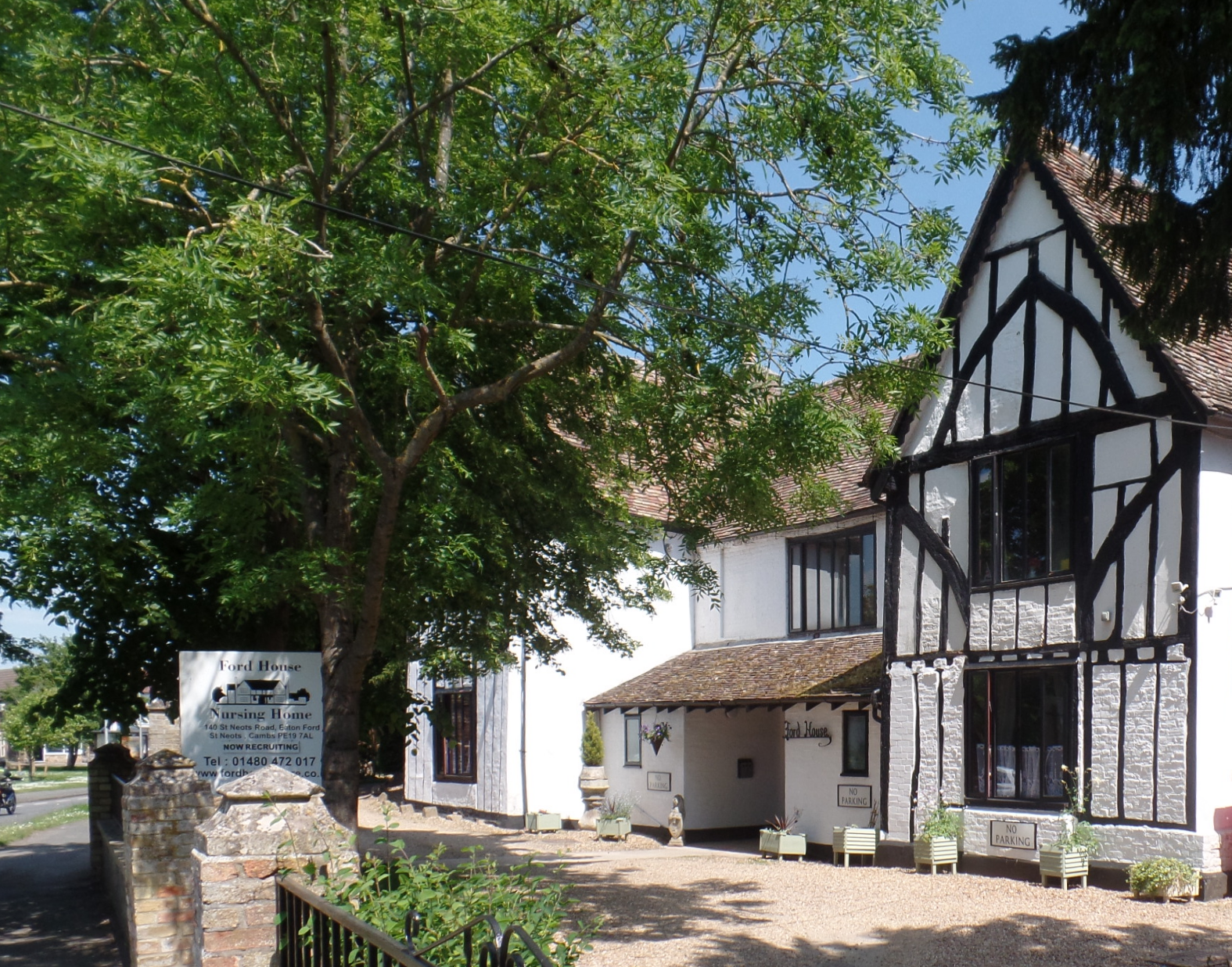
Ford House, Eaton Ford, said to be the oldest building in Eaton Ford

About 972 AD an Anglo-Saxon landowner named Leofric and his wife Leoflaed founded a small monastery in Eynesbury (at that time known as Ernulph's Bury, and including part of the present day St Neots). The settlement was established at the junction of Huntingdon Street and Cambridge Street.

The Priory had the potential to generate considerable income from the visits and donations of pilgrims, but to attract pilgrims they needed relics. Leofric decided to obtain the remains of Saint Neot, a much-revered Saxon monk who had spent much of his life in Cornwall and who had died in about 875 AD. His remains were kept there and had become the object of pilgrimages. Leofric arranged to abstract Neot's bones, depositing them in his Priory. This had the desired effect and the Priory became a major centre of attention for pilgrims. Over time, the Priory and the locality where it was situated, became known as St Neots.

The combination of visits of pilgrims and visitors to the market made the Ford at Eaton of great importance, and slowly the name Eaton Ford came to be used.

Young speculates that it was a little to the north of the present-day bridge, because of the angle of approach of Crosshall Road, which nowadays lurches southwards as it approaches the river.

== Sudbury ==
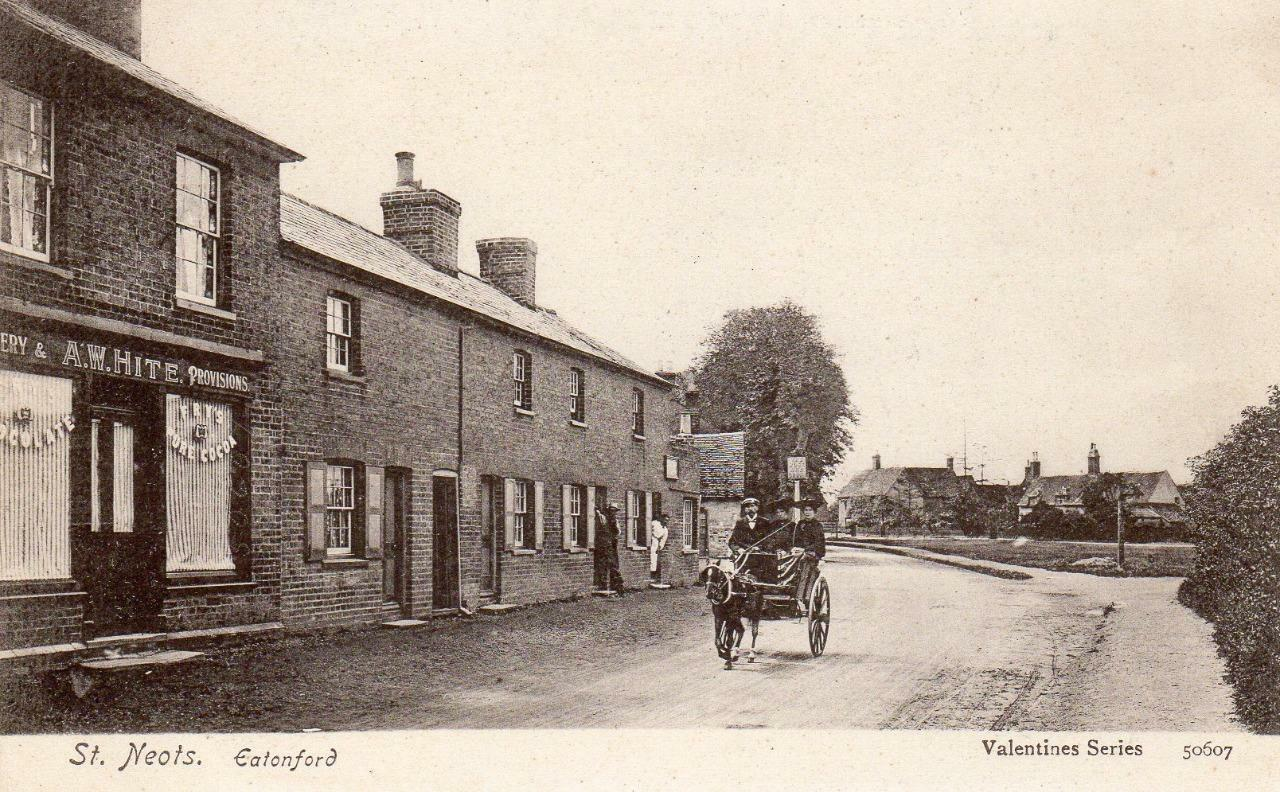
Eaton Ford about 1905

In Anglo-Saxon times there was a small settlement named Sudbury ("southern fort"). It was probably at the junction of the present-day Crosshall Road and the traditional Great North Road. In 1086, according to the Domesday Book, Eudo Dapifer held Eaton Socon "with the Manors of Wyboston and Sudbury"; the tenant-in-chief at Sudbury being Richard, son of Gilbert. Later, Sudbury was recorded as having belonged to St Neots Priory in King Edward’s time. The family who became Lords of the Manor there in the 13th century eventually adopted the name of the Manor as their surname and became known as "de Sudbury".

The Manor House may have stood on or near the site of the present farmhouse to the north-east of Cross Hall crossroads. The word "Hall" is usually associated with manor houses and it would be logical for a manor house situated at a crossroads to be called "Cross Hall". Traces of the strips that once composed the arable fields of Sudbury can still be seen as ridge-and-furrow waves on St Neots Golf Course. The disappearance of Sudbury village may have been due to the Black Death of 1348-9 which reputedly shrank the population of England by a third. Many travellers would have passed through the village from London to the north and they may have carried their germs with them.

== The river bridge ==
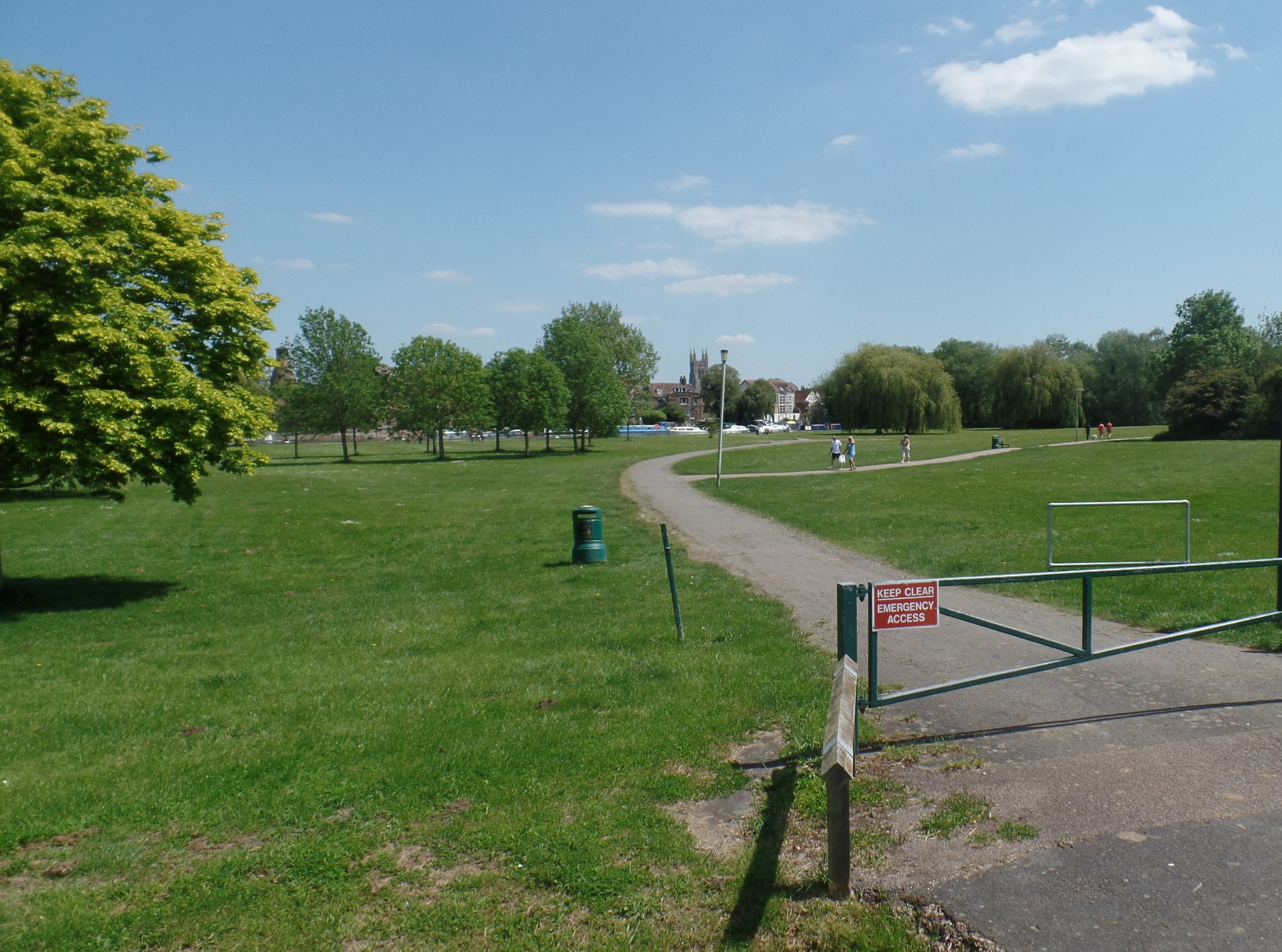
Riverside Park from Crosshall Road; the river runs along the far side

The first bridge across the River Great Ouse at St Neots was probably built in the 11th or 12th century to bring traders and pilgrims into the market place established by the monks of St Neots Priory. It probably replaced a ford. It was constructed entirely in timber and, because there were marshy areas both sides of the river, it included a long causeway.

In 1588, a new town bridge was built. A survey of the old bridge showed that it consisted of 72 arches, and it was 704 feet in length and 7 ft 6in wide. The replacement bridge was to have masonry piers up to the flood water level. The river formed the boundary between Bedfordshire and Huntingdonshire, so both counties had to contribute to the costs of materials and labour.

The town bridge was replaced again, probably in 1617, but this time entirely in masonry. The bridge was clearly of great importance as it allowed river traffic to pass without hindrance (by removal of the ford), and commerce was becoming increasingly important. Other improvements in the same period included river work to improve navigability, and to make Bedford accessible. In 1670 the River Ouse (Bedfordshire) Navigation Act was passed for improvements to the River Ouse, to enable navigation as far as Bedford.

During the 19th century the superstructure of the bridge was widened and the "scallops" peculiar to the Huntingdonshire half were carried across the whole length of the parapet. (The scallops were in fact jack-arches supported on cantilever beams, supporting the footway extensions.) The end of the bridge at Eaton Ford was also widened to make less of a bottleneck.

The old stone bridge survived well into the 20th century, but it proved inadequate for the weight of modern motor traffic, even when passage over it was restricted to one-way operation. There was a five mph speed limit. Because of its position on a county boundary, the negotiations regarding its replacement were prolonged and took over 20 years to complete. Finally in 1964, the picturesque but fragile structure was demolished and work began on the present more practical bridge.

== The Workhouse ==
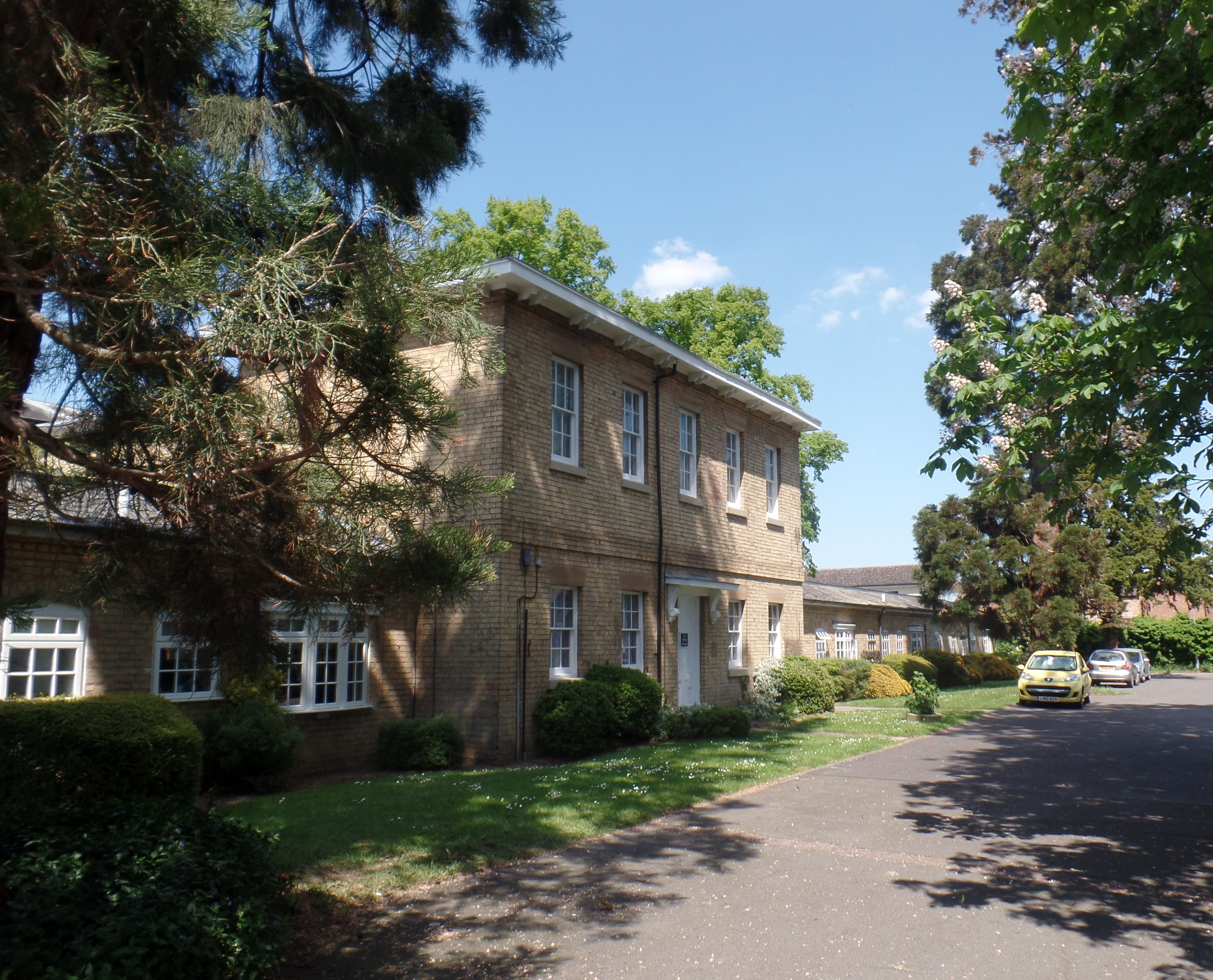
Former workhouse building in Eaton Ford

In the early years of the nineteenth century, the provision of relief for the destitute was uncoordinated and unsatisfactory. It was the Poor Law Amendment Act 1834 which gave local government the task of making coordinated arrangements, and this swiftly led to the formation of Poor Law Unions, in which parishes would collaborate in providing workhouses. The destitute would be given indoor shelter and food, and would be allocated work they were considered capable of. This resulted in the formation of St Neots Poor Law Union on 24 September 1835. After some difficulty in finding a suitable site, a workhouse was built in Eaton Socon (the location is now considered to be in Eaton Ford). Its capacity was 250 persons. A separate infirmary block was ready in 1879, increasing the limited capacity of the workhouse.

In the late 1920s the building ceased to operate as a workhouse, and became used as a hospital for the elderly, and renamed the White House. In the 1950s part of it was converted for use as flats, and in the 1980s the building was completely upgraded internally, and the entire building was made into flats.

== Housing expansion ==
In the period following 1960 Eaton Ford expanded quickly under the London overspill programme and subsequent housing development. Prior to this scheme, the housing stock in Eaton Ford was largely confined to ribbon development along St Neots Road and Mill Hill Road. The new housing infilled practically the whole of Eaton Ford, leaving only the Riverside Park and the golf course undeveloped.

== Crosshall schools ==
The Crosshall Infant and Junior Schools were opened in 1974 to respond to population growth.

== Public houses ==
The Eaton Oak is a hotel and restaurant near Crosshall crossroads; it is a listed building.

== Transfer from Bedfordshire ==
In common with Eaton Socon, Eaton Ford had historically been part of Bedfordshire. In the 1960s they were transferred to Huntingdonshire, to join St Neots, of which they had become a part for practical purposes. In 1974 Huntingdonshire was abolished as a County, and Eaton Ford was in Cambridgeshire.

== Golf club ==
St Neots Golf Club had existed from before 1900, but in 1912 it moved to its present site alongside Crosshall Road.

== Road improvements ==
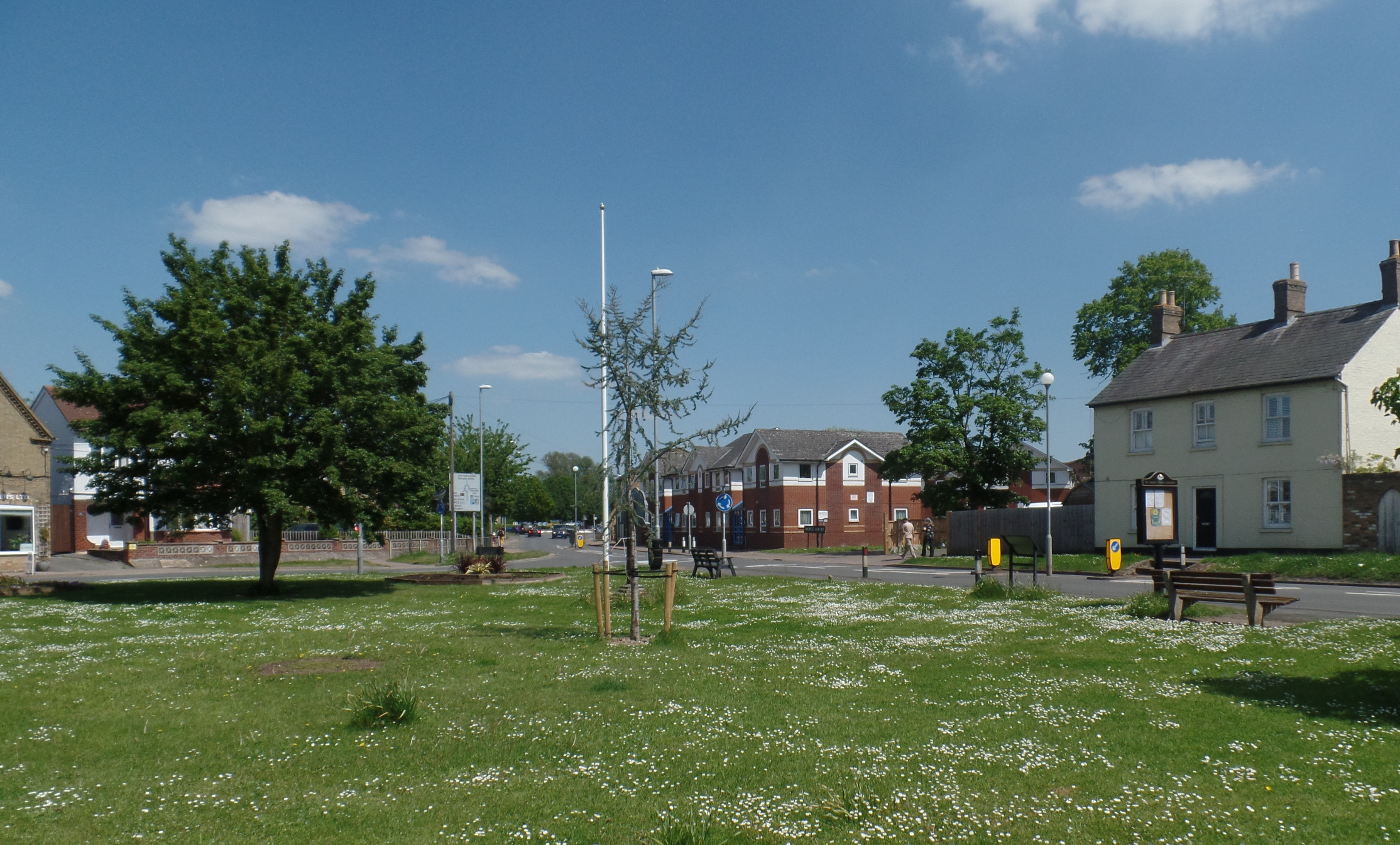
Eaton Ford Green

Until the 1960s, the road network in Eaton Ford consisted of the Great North Road, the spur of St Neots Road leading from the roundabout to the river bridge, Crosshall Road, and Mill Hill Road. The Great North Road was a busy and important route, but it was a single carriageway. Crosshall Road was part of the A45 trunk road, leading from Kimbolton to St Neots town centre and on to Cambridge.

When the present A1 road was built, forming a by-pass on the western side, the Great North Road served as the route into St Neots from Wyboston, and the section north of the roundabout carried local traffic only. When St Neots by-pass opened, the A45 traffic used the A1 to the Wyboston roundabout and then the by-pass, so that the whole Eaton Ford road network was now of local significance only.

== Army depot ==
From 1937 or 1938 there was an army depot alongside Mill Hill Road, on the south side. It extended over most of the length of Mill Hill Road. Intensely heightened political tension with Germany led to a period of rearmament, and a basic training camp for recruits was established. On the outbreak of World War II the camp was converted to be a base for the Royal Electrical and Mechanical Engineers. A searchlight and anti-aircraft gun emplacement were located within the camp, at the boundary at Great North Road.

After the war some families continued in residence on the site until 1959, when the site was sold out of army usage. The Eastern Electricity Board purchased it and from 1960 used it as a works depot and training facility. The EEB planned to develop the site further, but the local authority planning strategy prevented that. The EEB later ran their activity down, and withdrew completely by 1977. Housebuilding took place on the land as it was vacated. The last remaining building from the Army activity was removed in 1983.

== Government ==
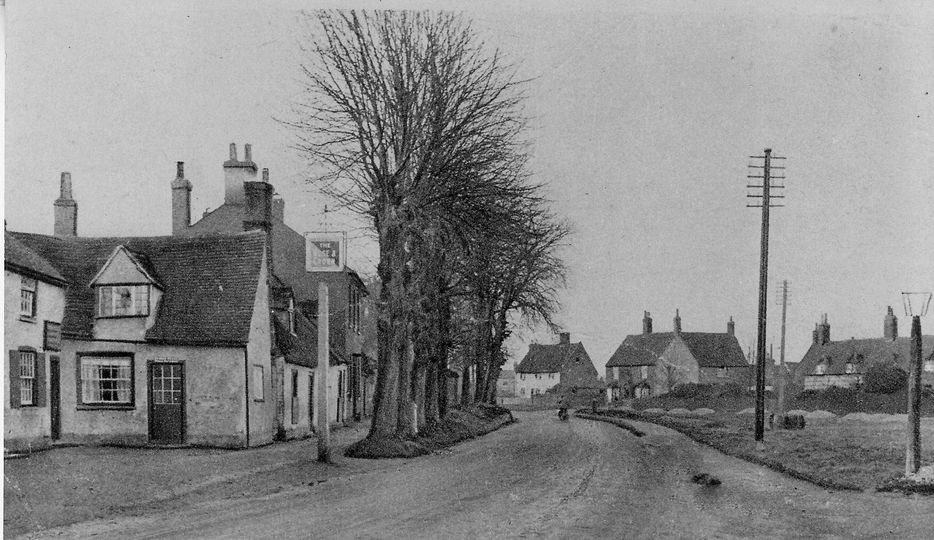
Rose and Crown pub Eaton Ford about 1905

Eaton Ford is within the area of St Neots Town Council; there is an Eaton Ford ward.

Huntingdonshire District Council is the next tier, with offices in Huntingdon. It collects all council tax and administers/provides building regulations, planning and environmental checks/approvals, day centres, assessed housing benefits, parks, waste collections, a communal leisure budget and supports tourism.

The next tier of local government is Cambridgeshire County Council, headquartered in Cambridge. This provides county-wide services such as road infrastructure, fire and rescue, education, social services, libraries and heritage.

The fourth tier is the Peterborough and Cambridgeshire Combined Authority, responsible for strategic planning.

Eaton Ford is in the Huntingdon parliamentary constituency. The Member of Parliament is (2021) Jonathan Djanogly (Conservative).
