= Barton (surname) =

The surname Barton has multiple possible origins. It may denote origin from one of the many places called Barton in England; however, another proposal would derive the name from Dunbarton in Scotland. The counties of Cheshire and Lancashire have the highest number of Barton families in the United Kingdom.

The surname name is also common in Germany, the Czech Republic (as Bartoň), Poland (as Bartoń or Barton) and other countries in the Slavic cultural sphere. In the vast majority of cases, it is also a short form of the name Bartholomew, originally a name borne by one of the apostles which became a popular forename in Europe in the Middle Ages.

In France, the name may derive from the commune of Barenton.

== People ==
=== Arts and entertainment ===
- Anne Barton (actress) (1924–2000), American actress
- Bernard Barton (1784–1849), English Quaker poet
- Bethany Barton (born 1982), American author and illustrator of children's books
- Charles Barton (director) (1902–1981), American actor and director
- Chris Barton (author), American author of children's books
- Dan Barton (1921–2009), American actor
- Edward Barton (musician) (born 1958), English poet, artist and songwriter
- Eileen Barton (1924–2006), American singer
- Emily Barton (born 1969), American novelist
- Fred Barton (composer) (born 1958), American composer and lyricist
- Harry Barton (architect) (1876–1937), American architect
- James Barton (vaudeville) (1890–1962), American vaudevillian and character actor
- Jamie Barton (singer) (born 1981), American opera singer
- John Barton (director) (1928–2018), English theatre director
- John Barton (writer), 15th-century English writer on Lollardy
- John Barton (poet) (born 1957), Canadian poet
- Margaret Barton (born 1926), British actress
- Marmaduke Barton (1865–1938), English pianist
- Mary Alice Barton (1917–2003), American quilter, quilt historian, collector, and philanthropist
- Mischa Barton (born 1986), British-born American actress and fashion model
- Peter Barton (actor) (born 1956), American actor
- Polly Barton (born 1956), American textile artist
- Ralph Barton (1891–1931), American artist
- Rick Barton (musician), American guitarist
- Roger Barton (film editor) (born 1966), American film editor
- Roxy Barton (1879–1962), Australian-born actress
- Stephen Barton (born 1982), British film and video game composer
- William Barton (writer) (born 1950), American science fiction writer
- William Barton (hymnologist) (1598–1678), English hymnologist
- William Barton (musician) (born 1981), Australian Didgeridoo player

=== Science, technology and medicine ===
- Alberto Barton (1870–1950), Peruvian microbiologist
- Benjamin Smith Barton (1766–1815), American botanist, naturalist and physician
- Clara Barton (1821–1912), founder of the American Red Cross
- David K. Barton (1927–2023), American radar engineer
- Derek Barton (1918–1998), English chemist
- Ethel Sarel Barton (1864–1922), English phycologist better known as Ethel Sarel Gepp
- George Hunt Barton (1852–1933), American geologist, arctic explorer and college professor
- Jacqueline Barton (born 1952), American chemist
- John Barton (engineer) (1771–1834), English engineer
- John Rhea Barton (1794–1871), American orthopedic surgeon
- Kira Barton, American mechanical engineer
- Lela Viola Barton (1901–1967), American botanist who specialized in seed germination and storage
- Michael Barton (biologist), American ichthyologist
- Otis Barton (1899–1992), American deep-sea diver
- Robert S. Barton (1925–2009), computer scientist, chief architect of several computers made by Burroughs Corporation
- Thomas J. Barton (born 1940), American chemist
- William P. C. Barton (1786–1856), American physician

=== Academics ===
- Anne Barton (Shakespearean scholar) (1933–2013), American-born British scholar and Shakespearean critic
- Andrew Barton (journalist), American journalist
- Arthur W. Barton (1899–1976), headmaster and academic author
- Cornelius J. Barton (1936–2024), American engineer and businessman
- H. Arnold Barton (1920–2016), American historian
- John Barton (economist) (1789–1852), British economist
- Martha Helen Barton (1891–1971), American mathematician and professor
- Peter Barton (historian) (born 1955), British military historian
- Reid W. Barton (born 1984), American mathematician
- William Barton (heraldist) (1754–1817), American lawyer and scholar

=== Military ===
- Charles Barton (British Army officer) (1760–1819), an Anglo-Irish British Army officer
- Geoffrey Barton (1844–1922), British major general
- Horace Barton (1891–1975), South Africa flying ace
- John Kennedy Barton (1853–1921), United States Navy rear admiral
- Matthew Barton (Royal Navy officer) (c. 1715–1795), English naval officer
- Raymond O. Barton (1890–1963), United States Army general in World War II
- Robert Barton of Over Barnton (died 1540), Scottish sailor and courtier
- Robert Barton (RAF officer) (1916–2010), Canadian aviation officer
- Seth Barton (1829–1900), Confederate general
- Thomas Barton (Medal of Honor) (1831–?), American Medal of Honor recipient
- William Barton (soldier) (1748–1831), American Revolutionary War soldier, known for capturing an enemy general

=== Politics, government and law ===
- Andrew Barton (privateer) (c. 1466–1511), Lord High Admiral of the Kingdom of Scotland
- Andrew William Barton (1862–1957), British politician
- Basil Barton (1879–1958), British solicitor and politician
- Ben Barton (1823–1899), American politician, physician, businessman
- Bruce Fairchild Barton (1886–1967), American author, advertising executive and politician
- Charles Barton (New South Wales politician) (1848–1912), Australian politician
- Charles Barton (legal writer) (1768–1843), English legal writer
- Charles Barton (Queensland politician) (1829–1902), Australian politician
- Charles Barton (New Zealand politician) (1852–1935), New Zealand farmer, businessman and mayor
- David Barton (politician) (1783–1837), American politician
- Edmund Barton (1849–1920), Australian politician and first Australian Prime Minister
- Edward Barton (diplomat) (c. 1533–1598), English diplomat
- Fred Barton (politician) (1917–1963), British socialist politician
- George Burnett Barton (1836–1912), Australian lawyer
- George Elliott Barton (1827–1906), New Zealand politician
- Henry Barton, appointed Sheriff of London in 1406 and elected Lord Mayor of London in 1416
- Hiram Barton (1810–1880), American politician
- Hiram Merritt Barton (1856–1928), American politician
- James R. Barton (c. 1810–1857), early Sheriff of Los Angeles County
- Joe Barton (born 1949), American politician
- John J. Barton (1906–2004), American politician
- John Barton (Fowey MP) (1614–1684), English politician
- John Saxon Barton (1875–1961), New Zealand accountant, writer, lawyer and magistrate
- Joshua Barton (1792–1823), American politician
- Philip Barton (born 1963), British diplomat
- Richard W. Barton (1800–1859), Virginia politician and lawyer
- Rick Barton (diplomat) (born 1949), American diplomat, educator and writer
- Robert Barton (1881–1975), Irish nationalist and diplomat
- Robert T. Barton (1842–1917), American lawyer, politician and writer
- Roger Barton (politician) (born 1945), British engineer and politician
- Samuel Barton (New York politician) (1785–1858), Americal politician
- Tom Barton (politician) (1949–2023), Australian politician
- Verity Barton (born 1985), Australian politician
- William E. Barton (1868–1955), American politician
- William Hickson Barton (1917–2013), Canadian diplomat
- William T. Barton (born 1933), American politician

=== Sports ===
- Adam Barton (footballer) (born 1991), English footballer
- Arthur Barton (cricketer) (1874–1949), English cricketer
- Bob Barton (1941–2018), American baseball player
- Brian Barton (born 1982), American baseball player
- Charles Barton (cricketer) (1860–1919), English cricketer
- Chris Barton (ice hockey) (born 1987), Canadian ice hockey player
- Chris Barton (cyclist) (born 1988), American cyclist
- Christopher Barton (1927–2013), British rower
- Cody Barton (born 1996), American football player
- Dick Barton (boxer) (1911–1990), South African boxer
- Eddie Barton, New Zealand footballer
- Eric Barton (born 1977), American football player
- Frederick Barton (pentathlete) (1900–1993), British pentathlete
- George Barton (sport shooter) (born 1977), Australian sport shooter
- Harold Barton (footballer) (1910–1969), English footballer
- Harold Barton (cricketer) (1882–1970), English cricketer
- Harris Barton (born 1964), American football player
- Harry Barton (baseball) (1875–1955), American baseball player
- Iván Barton (born 1991), Salvadoran football referee
- Jackson Barton (born 1995), American football player
- Jim Barton (American football) (1934–2013), American football player
- Jim Barton (sailor) (born 1956), American sailor
- Joe Barton (soccer) (born 1981), American soccer player
- Joey Barton (born 1982), English footballer
- John Barton (rugby league), English rugby league footballer
- John Barton (footballer, born 1866) (1866–1910), English footballer
- John Barton (footballer, born 1953), English football player
- Joseph Barton (cricketer) (1860–1945), English cricketer
- Kirk Barton (born 1984), retired American football player
- Matthew Barton (tennis) (born 1991), Australian tennis player
- Michael Barton (cricketer) (1914–2006), English cricketer
- Paul Barton (born 1935), New Zealand cricketer
- Peter Barton (rugby league), rugby league footballer of the 1960s
- Roger Barton (footballer) (1946–2013), English footballer
- Roger Barton (rugby union) (1876–1949), Australian rugby union player
- Sally Barton (born 1957), English cricketer representing Gibraltar
- Teddy Barton (1904–1941), English footballer
- Tom Barton (rugby league) (1883–1958), English rugby league footballer
- Tony Barton (footballer) (1937–1993), English football player and manager
- Tony Barton (athlete) (born 1969), American high jumper
- Warren Barton (born 1969), English footballer
- Will Barton (born 1991), American basketball player
- William Barton (cricketer, born 1777) (1777–1825), English cricketer
- William Barton (cricketer, born 1858) (1858–1942), New Zealand cricketer

=== Religion ===
- Arthur Barton (bishop) (1881–1962), Irish Anglican bishop
- David Barton (author) (born 1954), American evangelical minister, author and political activist
- Elizabeth Barton (c. 1506–1534), English prophetess
- George Aaron Barton (1859–1942), Canadian author and clergyman
- Harry Barton (priest) (1898–1968), Archdeacon of Sudbury
- James L. Barton (1835–1936) Chairman of Near East Relief
- John Barton (missionary) (1836–1908), English Anglican priest
- John Barton (Quaker) (1755–1789), English Quaker and abolitionist
- John Barton (theologian) (born 1948), English theologian and professor
- Lane W. Barton (1899–1997), American bishop
- Richard Bradshaigh (1601–1669), Jesuit priest, known as Richard Barton
- Thomas Barton (divine) (1730–1780), Irish divine
- Thomas Barton (Royalist) (died 1681/2), Royalist divine
- William Barton (priest), Archdeacon of Totnes, 1385–1407

=== Other ===
- Margo Barton, New Zealand fashion designer and milliner
- Rich Barton (born 1967), American businessman
- Richard Barton (1790–1866), colonist and settler of New Zealand

== Fictional characters ==
- Ashley Barton, alter ego of Marvel Comics supervillain Spider-Bitch
- Dick Barton, fictional detective
- Clint Barton, alter ego of Marvel Comics superhero Hawkeye
- Charlie Barton, a character in The Howling (film)
- Holly Barton, a character from the British soap opera Emmerdale
- James Barton (Emmerdale), a character from the British soap opera Emmerdale
- John Barton (Emmerdale), a character in British soap Emmerdale
- John Barton, a character in Elizabeth Gaskell's novel Mary Barton
- John Barton, a character in Looking for Alibrandi

== See also ==
- Edward Barton-Wright (1860–1951), British entrepreneur
- John de Barton, 14th century judge
- Mike Polchlopek (born 1963), American wrestler with the ring name Mike Barton
