= John Barton =

John Barton may refer to:

== Arts and entertainment ==
- John Barton (writer), 15th century English writer on Lollardy
- John Barton (director) (1928–2018), English theatre director and founding member of the Royal Shakespeare Company
- John Barton (poet) (born 1957), Canadian poet

== Law and politics ==
- John Barton (died 1432), English politician who served as MP for Buckinghamshire several times between 1397 and 1414
- John Barton (died 1434), English politician who served as MP for Buckinghamshire several times between 1414 and 1423
- John Barton (Fowey MP) (1614–1684), English lawyer and politician who sat in the House of Commons in 1659 and 1660
- John Barton (public administrator) (1875–1961), New Zealand accountant, writer, lawyer, magistrate and public administrator
- John J. Barton (1906–2004), Mayor of Indianapolis

== Religion ==
- John Barton (missionary) (1836–1908), English Anglican priest
- John Barton (priest) (born 1936), British Anglican priest
- John Barton (theologian) (born 1948), British theologian and professor

== Sports ==
- John Barton (footballer, born 1866) (1866–1910), English international footballer
- Jack Barton (footballer, born 1895) (1895–1962) English footballer
- John Barton (footballer, born 1953), English footballer
- John Barton (rugby league), English rugby league footballer
- John Barton (rugby union) (1943–2021), English rugby union footballer

== Others ==
- John Barton (Quaker) (1755–1789), English abolitionist
- John Barton (engineer) (1771–1834), English engineer noted for his engravings using his Ruling Engine
- John Barton (economist) (1789–1852), English economist
- John Rhea Barton (1794–1871), American orthopedic surgeon
- John Kennedy Barton (1853–1921), Rear Admiral in the United States Navy
- John Barton (businessman) (1944–2021), English businessman, chairman of Next plc and EasyJet
- John P. Barton (born 1934), British and American applied nuclear scientist

== Characters ==
- John Barton (Emmerdale), a fictional character in British soap Emmerdale
- John Barton, a fictional character in Mrs. Gaskell's short story Mary Barton
- John Barton, a fictional character in Looking for Alibrandi

== See also ==
- Jack Barton (disambiguation)
- John de Barton, 14th century English judge
