= Joseph Barton =

Joseph Barton may refer to:

- Joe Barton (born 1949), American politician from Texas
- Joseph Barton (New Hampshire politician)
- Joseph Barton (cricketer) (1860–1945), English cricketer
- Joe Barton (soccer) (born 1981), American soccer player
- Joey Barton (born 1982), English footballer
- Joseph Barton, character in Eden (Steve Carter play)
- Joe Barton (screenwriter) (born 1985), British television writer
