= Bartoň =

Bartoň (feminine: Bartoňová) is a Czech surname, derived from the given name Bartoloměj (Czech variant of Bartholomew). Notable people with the surname include:

- Antonín Bartoň (1908–1982), Czech skier
- Eva Bartoňová (born 1993), Czech footballer
- Hynek Bartoň (born 2004), Czech tennis player
- Jakub Bartoň (born 1981), Czech hockey player
- Kateřina Bartoňová (born 1990), Czech basketball player
- Luboš Bartoň (born 1980), Czech basketball player
- Slavomír Bartoň (1926–2004), Czech ice hockey player

== See also ==
- Barton (surname)
