= Andrew Barton =

Andrew Barton may refer to:

== Politicians ==
- William Barton (British politician) (Andrew William Barton, 1862–1957), British Member of Parliament for Oldham, 1910–1922
- Andrew Barton (16th-century MP)

== Others ==
- Sir Andrew Barton (privateer) (c. 1466–1511), Scottish privateer
- Andrew Barton, pseudonym used by the composer of The Disappointment (1762)
- Andrew Barton (journalist), lecturer in the School of Communication at the University of Miami
- Banjo Paterson (Andrew Barton Paterson, 1864–1941), Australian poet

== See also ==
- Andy Barton (disambiguation)
