= Anne Barton =

Anne Barton may refer to:

- Anne Barton (actress) (1924–2000), American actress
- Anne Barton (Shakespearean scholar) (1933–2013), American-English Shakespearean scholar and critic
