= List of treasurers to British royal consorts =

Below is an incomplete list of those who have served as treasurer to British royal consorts.

== List of treasurers ==
=== Caroline, Princess of Wales, later Queen Caroline (1714–1737) ===
- 1727–1730: Sir William Strickland, 4th Baronet
- 1730–1737: John Selwyn

=== Queen Charlotte (1761–1818) ===
- 1761–1773: Andrew Stone
- 1774–1790: Francis North, 1st Earl of Guilford
- 1790–1792: Vacant?
- 1792–1814: Thomas Brudenell-Bruce, 1st Earl of Ailesbury
- 1814–1816: Richard Howard, 4th Earl of Effingham
- 1817–1818: Herbert Taylor

=== Queen Adelaide (1830–1837) ===
- 1830–1834: John Barton
- 1834–1837: William Ashley

=== Alexandra, Princess of Wales, later Queen Alexandra (1873–1925) ===
- 1901–1923: Frederick Robinson, Earl de Grey (Marquess of Ripon from 1909)
- 1923–1925: Vacant?

=== Queen Mary (1910–1953) ===
- 1910–?: Hon. Alexander Hood
- 1932–1936: Sir Harry Lloyd-Verney

=== Queen Elizabeth (1937–2002) ===
- 1937–1945: Sir Basil Vernon Brooke
- 1946–1960: Sir Arthur Horace Penn
- 1961–1998: Sir Ralph Anstruther, 7th Baronet Later Treasurer Emeritus
- 1998–2002: Nicholas Assheton

=== Prince Philip, Duke of Edinburgh (1952–1995) ===
- 1952–1959: Sir Frederick Browning
- 1957–1960: David Alexander (acting)
- 1959–1970: Christopher Bonham-Carter
- 1970–1982: Lord Rupert Nevill
- 1982–1984: Sir Richard Davies (acting)
- 1984–1995: Sir Brian McGrath

== See also ==
- Treasurer of the Household
