= Roger Barton =

Roger Barton may refer to:

- Roger Barton (film editor) (born 1965), American film editor
- Roger Barton (footballer) (1946–2013), English footballer
- Roger Barton (politician) (born 1945), British engineer and politician
- Roger Barton (rugby union) (1876–1949), rugby union player who represented Australia
