= Treasurer of the Household =

Member of the British Royal Household

The Treasurer of the Household is a member of the Royal Household of the Sovereign of the United Kingdom. The position is usually held by one of the government deputy Chief Whips in the House of Commons. The current holder of the office is Sir Mark Tami MP.

The position had its origin in the office of Treasurer (or Keeper) of the Wardrobe and was ranked second after the Lord Steward. The office was often staffed by the promotion of the Comptroller of the Household. On occasion (e.g. 1488–1503) the office was vacant for a considerable period and its duties undertaken by the Cofferer of the Household. By the end of the 17th century the office of Treasurer was more or less a sinecure, and in the 18th and 19th centuries it was usually occupied by peers who were members of the Government. The Treasurer was automatically a member of the privy council. They were a member of the Board of Green Cloth until that was abolished by reform of local government licensing in 2004 under section 195 of the Licensing Act 2003.

On state occasions, the Treasurer of the Household (in common with certain other senior officers of the Household) carries a white staff of office.

== Treasurers of the Household ==
=== 15th century ===
- John Tiptoft, 1st Baron Tiptoft 1406–1408
- Roger Leche 1413–1416
- Walter Beauchamp 1421–1430
- Sir John Tyrrell of Heron May 1431 – April 1437
- John Popham 1437–1439
- Sir Roger Fiennes 1439–1446
- John Stourton, 1st Baron Stourton 1446–1453
- Sir Thomas Tuddenham 1458
- Sir John Fogge 1461–1468
- Sir John Howard 1468–1474.
- Sir John Elrington 1474–1483
- Sir William Hopton 1483–1484
- Sir Richard Croft 1484–1488
- vacant 1488 on: office performed by cofferers:
  - John Payne 1488–1492
  - William Fisher 1492–1494
  - William Cope 1494-?1508 (died 1513)

=== 16th century ===
- Sir Andrew Windsor 1513
- Sir Thomas Lovell 1502 (by)-c. 1519
- Sir Edward Poynings 1519–1521
- Sir Thomas Boleyn 1521–1525
- Sir William FitzWilliam 1525–1537
- Sir William Paulet 1537–1539
- Sir Thomas Cheney 1539–1558
- Sir Thomas Parry 1559–1560
- vacant 1560–1570
- Sir Francis Knollys 1570–1596
- Roger North, 2nd Baron North 1596–1600

=== 17th century ===
- vacant 1600–1602
- Sir William Knollys 1602–1616
- Edward Wotton, 1st Baron Wotton 1616–1618
- Sir Thomas Edmonds 1618–1639
- Sir Henry Vane 1639–1641
- Thomas Savile, 1st Viscount Savile 1641–1649
- Sir Frederick Cornwallis 1660–1663
- Charles Berkeley, 2nd Viscount Fitzhardinge 1663–1668
- Sir Thomas Clifford 1668–1672
- Francis Newport, 1st Viscount Newport 1672–1686
- William Paston, 2nd Earl of Yarmouth 1686–1689
- Francis Newport, 1st Earl of Bradford 1689–1708

=== 18th century ===
- Hugh Cholmondeley, 1st Earl of Cholmondeley 1708–1712
- George Granville, 1st Baron Lansdown 1712–1714
- Hugh Cholmondeley, 1st Earl of Cholmondeley 1714–1725
- Paul Methuen 1725–1730
- Robert Benson, 1st Baron Bingley 1730–1731
- John West, 7th Baron De La Warr 1731–1737
- Benjamin Mildmay, 1st Earl FitzWalter 1737–1755
- John Berkeley, 5th Baron Berkeley of Stratton 1755–1756
- John Bateman, 2nd Viscount Bateman 1756–1757
- Percy Wyndham-O'Brien, 1st Earl of Thomond 1757–1761
- Henry Herbert, 1st Earl of Powis 1761–1765
- George Edgcumbe, 3rd Baron Edgcumbe 1765–1766
- John Shelley 1766–1777
- Frederick Howard, 5th Earl of Carlisle 1777–1779
- George Onslow, 4th Baron Onslow 1779–1780
- James Cecil, Viscount Cranborne 1780–1782
- Thomas Howard, 3rd Earl of Effingham 1782–1783
- Charles Francis Greville 1783–1784
- James Stopford, 2nd Earl of Courtown 1784–1793
- James Stopford, Viscount Stopford 1793–1806

=== 19th century ===
- Charles Bennet, Lord Ossulston 1806–1807
- James Stopford, Viscount Stopford 1807–1812
- Robert Jocelyn, Viscount Jocelyn 1812
- Lord Charles Bentinck 1812–1826
- Sir William Henry Fremantle 1826–1837
- Henry Fitzalan-Howard, Earl of Surrey 1837–1841
- George Byng 1841
- Frederick Hervey, Earl Jermyn 1841–1846
- Lord Robert Grosvenor 1846–1847
- Lord Marcus Hill 1847–1852
- Lord Claud Hamilton 1852
- George Phipps, Earl of Mulgrave 1853–1858
- Lord Claud Hamilton 1858–1859
- William Keppel, Viscount Bury 1859–1866
- Lord Otho FitzGerald 1866
- William Cecil, Lord Burghley 1866–1867
- Percy Egerton Herbert 1867–1868
- George Warren, 2nd Baron de Tabley 1868–1872
- Augustus Bampfylde, 2nd Baron Poltimore 1872–1874
- William Monson, 7th Baron Monson 1874
- Henry Percy, Earl Percy 1874–1875
- Lord Henry Thynne 1875–1880
- Gavin Campbell, 7th Earl of Breadalbane and Holland 1880–1885
- William Pleydell-Bouverie, Viscount Folkestone 1885–1886
- Victor Bruce, 9th Earl of Elgin 1886
- William Pleydell-Bouverie, Viscount Folkestone 1886–1891
- Lord Walter Gordon-Lennox 1891–1892
- Edwyn Scudamore-Stanhope, 10th Earl of Chesterfield 1892–1894
- Arthur Brand 1894–1895
- George Osborne, Marquess of Carmarthen 1895–1896
- Richard Curzon, Viscount Curzon 1896–1900

=== 20th century ===
Portrait	Name	Term of office		Party	Prime Minister
	Victor Cavendish	1900	1903	Conservative (Lib.U)	Robert Gascoyne-Cecil, 3rd Marquess of Salisbury
	Victor Cavendish	1900	1903	Conservative (Lib.U)	Arthur Balfour
	James Hamilton, Marquess of Hamilton	1903	1905	Conservative (Lib.U)	Arthur Balfour
	Sir Edward Strachey, Bt	1905	1909	Liberal Party	Henry Campbell-Bannerman
	Sir Edward Strachey, Bt	1905	1909	Liberal Party	H. H. Asquith
	William Dudley Ward	1909	1912	Liberal Party	H. H. Asquith
	Frederick Edward Guest	1912	1915		H. H. Asquith
	James Hope	1915	1916	Conservative (UUP)	H. H. Asquith
	James Hope	1915	1916	Conservative (UUP)	David Lloyd George
	James Craig	28 December 1916	22 January 1918	Conservative (UUP)	David Lloyd George
vacancy		22 January 1918	June 1918		David Lloyd George
	Robert Sanders	1918	1919	Conservative	David Lloyd George
	Bolton Eyres-Monsell	1919	1921	Conservative	David Lloyd George
	George Gibbs	1921	1924	Conservative	David Lloyd George
	George Gibbs	1921	1924	Conservative	Bonar Law
	George Gibbs	1921	1924	Conservative	Stanley Baldwin
	Thomas Griffiths	1924	1924	Labour	Ramsay MacDonald
	George Gibbs	1924	1928	Conservative	Stanley Baldwin
	George Hennessy	1928	1929	Conservative	Stanley Baldwin
	Ben Smith	1929	1931	Labour	Ramsay MacDonald
	George Hennessy	1931		Conservative	Ramsay MacDonald
	Sir Frederick Thomson, 1st Baronet	1931	21 April 1935	Conservative (Scot.U)	Ramsay MacDonald
	Sir Frederick Penny, Bt	1935	1937	Conservative	Ramsay MacDonald
	Sir Frederick Penny, Bt	1935	1937	Conservative	Stanley Baldwin
	Sir Lambert Ward	1 June 1937	1937	Conservative	Neville Chamberlain
	Arthur Hope	15 October 1937	1939	Conservative	Neville Chamberlain
	Charles Waterhouse	11 April 1939	1939	Conservative	Neville Chamberlain
	Robert Grimston	14 November 1939	1942	Conservative	Neville Chamberlain
	Robert Grimston	14 November 1939	1942	Conservative	Winston Churchill
	Sir James Edmondson	1942	1945	Conservative	Winston Churchill
	George Mathers	1945	1946	Labour	Clement Attlee
	Arthur Pearson	1946	1951	Labour	Clement Attlee
	Cedric Drewe	1951	1955	Conservative	Winston Churchill
	Tam Galbraith	1955	1957	Conservative	Anthony Eden
	Hendrie Oakshott	1957	1959	Conservative	Harold Macmillan
	Peter Legh	1959	1960	Conservative	Harold Macmillan
	Edward Wakefield	1960	1962	Conservative	Harold Macmillan
	Michael Hughes-Young	1962	1964	Conservative	Harold Macmillan
	Michael Hughes-Young	1962	1964	Conservative	Alec Douglas-Home
	Sydney Irving	1964	1966	Labour	Harold Wilson
	John Silkin	1966		Labour	Harold Wilson
	Charles Grey	1966	1969	Labour	Harold Wilson
	Charles Richard Morris	1969	1970	Labour	Harold Wilson
	Humphrey Atkins	1970	1973	Conservative	Ted Heath
	Bernard Weatherill	1973	1974	Conservative	Ted Heath
	Walter Harrison	1974	1979	Labour	Harold Wilson
	Walter Harrison	1974	1979	Labour	James Callaghan
	John Stradling Thomas	1979	1983	Conservative	Margaret Thatcher
	Anthony Berry	1983		Conservative	Margaret Thatcher
	John Cope	1983	1987	Conservative	Margaret Thatcher
	David Hunt	1987	1989	Conservative	Margaret Thatcher
	Tristan Garel-Jones	1989	1990	Conservative	Margaret Thatcher
	Alastair Goodlad	14 July 1990	15 April 1992	Conservative	Margaret Thatcher
	Alastair Goodlad	14 July 1990	15 April 1992	Conservative	John Major
	David Heathcoat-Amory	1992	1993	Conservative	John Major
	Greg Knight	1993	1996	Conservative	John Major
	Andrew MacKay	1996	2 May 1997	Conservative	John Major
	George Mudie	2 May 1997	1998	Labour	Tony Blair
	Keith Bradley	1998	2001	Labour	Tony Blair

=== 21st century ===
Portrait	Name	Term of office		Party	Prime Minister
	Keith Hill	8 June 2001	13 June 2003	Labour	Tony Blair
	Bob Ainsworth	13 June 2003	28 June 2007	Labour	Tony Blair
	Nick Brown	28 June 2007	3 October 2008	Labour	Gordon Brown
	Tommy McAvoy	5 October 2008	11 May 2010	Labour	Gordon Brown
	Sir John Randall	11 May 2010	6 October 2013	Conservative	David Cameron
	Greg Hands	7 October 2013	11 May 2015	Conservative	David Cameron
	Anne Milton	11 May 2015	12 June 2017	Conservative	David Cameron
	Anne Milton	11 May 2015	12 June 2017	Conservative	Theresa May
	Julian Smith	13 June 2017	2 November 2017	Conservative	Theresa May
	Esther McVey	2 November 2017	9 January 2018	Conservative	Theresa May
	Christopher Pincher	9 January 2018	25 July 2019	Conservative	Theresa May
	Amanda Milling	28 July 2019	13 February 2020	Conservative	Boris Johnson
	Stuart Andrew	13 February 2020	8 February 2022	Conservative	Boris Johnson
	Christopher Pincher	8 February 2022	30 June 2022	Conservative	Boris Johnson
	Kelly Tolhurst	1 July 2022	7 September 2022	Conservative	Boris Johnson
	Craig Whittaker	8 September 2022	27 October 2022	Conservative	Liz Truss
	Marcus Jones	27 October 2022	5 July 2024	Conservative	Rishi Sunak
	Mark Tami	10 July 2024	Incumbent	Labour	Keir Starmer; Andy Burnham

== See also ==
- List of treasurers to British royal consorts
