= Charles Boileau Elliott =

English travel writer

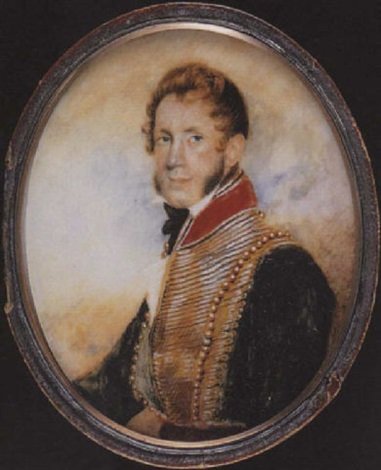
Charles Boileau Elliott in the uniform of the Bengal Horse Artillery

Charles Boileau Elliott (1803–1875) was an English travel writer. He published 3 travel diaries in his lifetime. His best known works are Letters from the North of Europe, Travels in the Three Great Empires, and Travels in the Archipelago. All 3 books provide a unique historical account of life in those areas during the mid 1800s just prior to the wars and industrial achievements that would be coming later in the 20th century.

== Life ==
Elliott was the son of Charles Elliot and Alicia Boileau who were married in 1802. He was educated at Harrow School and East India Company College, Hertfordshire. He spent some time in India as an Artillery Officer with the East India Company. He matriculated at Queens' College, Cambridge in 1829, graduating B.A. in 1833, and M.A. in 1837. He became vicar of Godalming in Surrey in 1833, and rector of Tattingstone in Suffolk in 1838. During the writing of his most famous work, Travels in the Three Great Empires, he wrote extensively about the political, social, and economic conditions of the day in what is now Austria, Russia, Hungary, Prague, Slovenia, Crimea, Macedonia and Turkey.

== Family ==
His daughters married:

- Alicia Eling, in 1862 to John Brettle Cane in the British Legation, Bern in 1862 John Brettle Cane later became rector of Tattingstone in 1886, remaining in post until his death in 1896.
- Isabel Maria, in 1869, to Mackworth Young, dying in 1870;
- Emily Eugenia, in 1863, to John Barton;
- Harriot Mary, in 1881, to Handley Carr Glyn Moule.
- Helen Elizabeth, in 1891, to Francis Samuel Paynter, rector of All Saints' Church, Springfield, Essex

== Works ==
- Letters from the North of Europe (1832)
- Travels in the Three Great Empires of Austria, Russia, and Turkey (1838)
- Travels in the Archipelago (1840)
