= Maria Hack =

English writer of educational books for children (1777–1844)

Maria Hack (née Barton, 16 February 1777 – 4 January 1844) was an English writer of educational books for children that were praised for their clarity. She was involved in a theological controversy among the Quakers, which led to her joining the Anglican Church. Her books reflect a literal belief in biblical Creation: "A watch must have a watchmaker."

== Life ==
Maria was born to John Barton (1755–1789) and his wife Maria Done (1752–1784) in Carlisle on 16 February 1777. Both her parents were Quakers. The family moved to London before Maria's mother died. Her father married again to Elizabeth Horne (1760–1833) of Tottenham, with whose family Mary lived after her father's death.

After her marriage, Maria Hack, influenced by the Evangelicalism of her time, became involved in a religious controversy among the Quakers, supporting a Manchester minister, Isaac Crewdson, in arguing that Scripture, not Inner Light, should be the ultimate authority and that the sacraments of Baptism and Communion should be performed. She left the Quakers in 1837 and joined the Anglican Church soon after, as a sister and three of her children had already done. Her contribution to the controversy was a tract entitled The Christian Ordinances and the Lord's Supper... (1837).

Hack moved from Gloucester to Southampton in about 1842 and died there on 4 January 1844.

== Writings ==
According to a younger brother, the poet Bernard Barton (1784–1849), Maria was an "oracle" to him in his youth. Her interest in education began with her own family and soon extended into writing. The earliest of many books is thought to have been First Lessons in English Grammar (1812). Winter Evenings (1818) teaches geography through travellers' tales told to two children. The same approach was taken in Grecian Stories (1819) and English Stories (1820–25). Others of her textbooks covered geology and optics. Some of these were still being reprinted in the 1870s.

Hack's best known work was Harry Beaufoy, or, The Pupil of Nature (1821), in which a boy is encouraged by his parents to look closely at creation and discover the marks of a Creator, for "a watch must have a watchmaker" (p. 183). Other examples given as marks of God's creation are the circulation of the blood and the workings of a beehive. The Journal of Education (April 1831) was quoted in a publisher's announcement in another volume as saying that "the mechanism of the human frame is explained so simply and so clearly, that children of ten years old can fully understand and take an interest in the perusal."

== Bibliography ==
Taken from the Dictionary of National Biography (1890) and the British Library Integrated Catalogue:

- First Lessons in English Grammar ("By M. H.", Chichester, 1812).
- The Winter-Scene ("By M. H.", London, 1818).
- Winter Evenings; or Tales of Travellers (4 vols, London, 1818; new illustrated e. c. 1840; reissued 1853 and 1857 [New York]).
- Grecian Stories, taken from the Works of Eminent Historians (London: Harvey and Darton/G. and W. B. Whittaker, 1819, reissued 1824, 1829 and 1840).
- English Stories, illustrating some of the most interesting events and characters between the Accession of Alfred and the Death of John (London, 1820).
- English Stories. Second series, between the Accession of Henry the Third and the Death of Henry the Sixth (London, 1820).
- Harry Beaufoy; or the Pupil of Nature (London, 1821; reissued 1824, 1830 etc.)
- Familiar Illustrations of the principal evidences and design of Christianity (London, 1824).
- English Stories. Third Series, Reformation under the Tudor Princes (London, 1825).
- Oriental fragments (London, 1828)
- Geological Sketches and Glimpses of the ancient Earth (London, 1832).
- Lectures at Home. Discovery and manufacture of glass; lenses and mirrors; the structure of the eye (London, 1834; reissued 1841).
- The Christian Ordinances of Baptism and the Lord's Supper not Typical Rites (London/Birmingham/Gloucester, 1837).
- Stories of Animals (French translation: 1839).
- A Second Series of Stories of Animals.
- The Child's Atlas.
- A Geographical Panorama.
- Inland and Ice Deserts (London: G. Routledge and Son, reissued 1877 and 1879).
- Adventures by Land and Sea (London: G. Routledge and Son, reissued 1877 and 1879).
- Travels in Hot and Cold Lands (London: G. Routledge and Son, reissued 1877 and 1879).

== Family ==
Maria Barton married the Chichester currier Stephen Hack (1775–1823) on 17 November 1800 in Tottenham. The couple had four sons and six daughters:

- The eldest son, John Barton Hack (1805–1884), emigrated to South Australia, as did the youngest, Stephen (1816–1894). Both later left the Quakers.
- Margaret Emily (1814–1886) also wrote educational books, and married Thomas Gates Darton (1810–1887) of Darton and Harvey, the publisher of some of her mother's books.
- Thomas Sandon Hack (1811–1865) was an architect who designed several buildings in Southampton, including the Royal Southern Yacht Club (opened 1846) and the original Royal South Hants Infirmary (opened 1844).

At some point the family moved from Chichester to Gloucester.
