= Richard Ryan (biographer) =

Irish British writer (1797–1849)

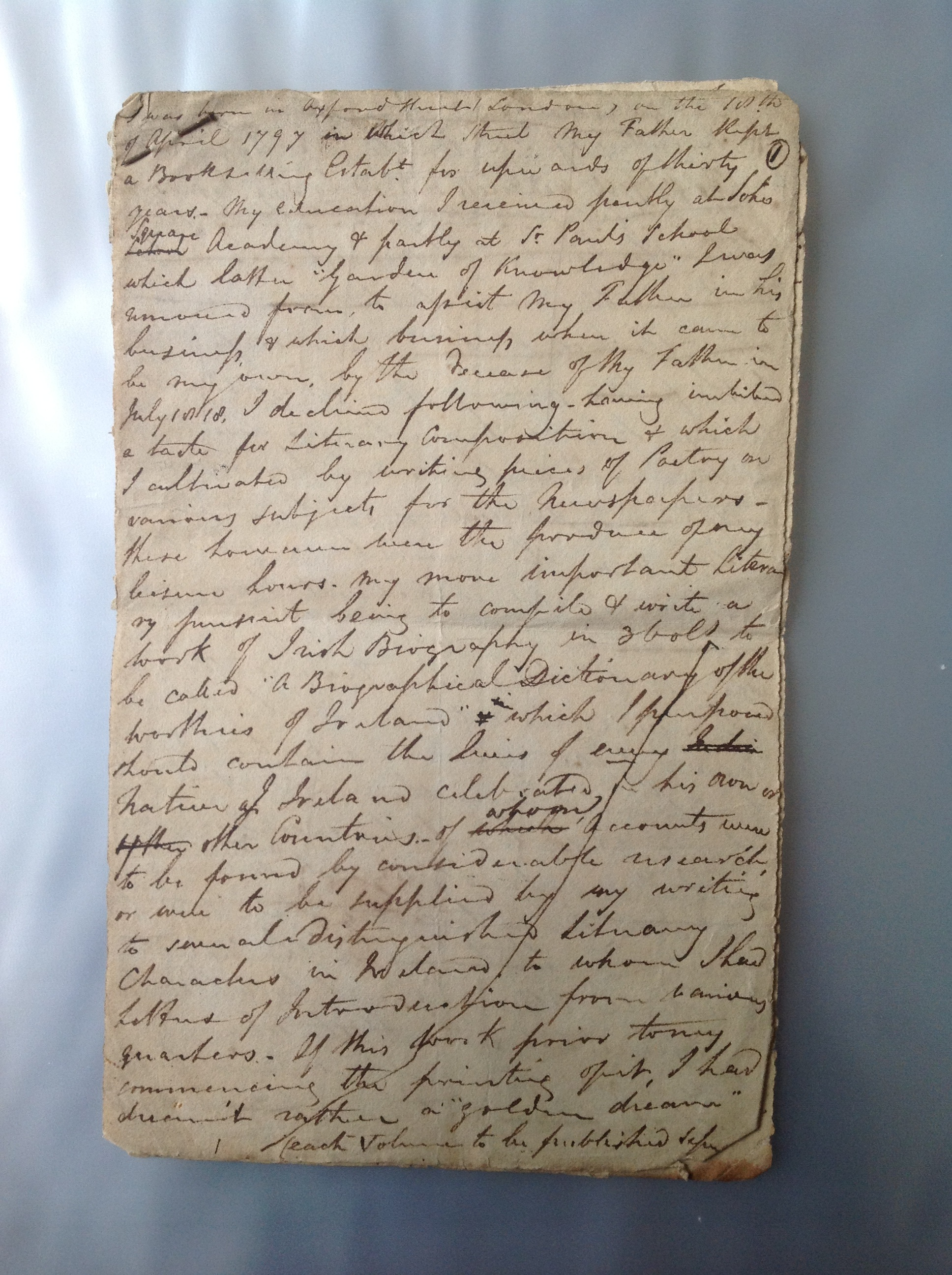
Autobiographical journal entry by Richard Ryan explaining his life and plans in 1819, including his Irish dictionary of national biography The Worthies of Ireland.

Richard Ryan (18 April 1797 – 20 October 1849) was a British writer of Irish descent. He was the son of Oxford Street, London bookseller and publisher Richard Ryan and was educated at St Paul's School, London.

Ryan produced the first Irish biographical dictionary Biographia Hibernica, a Biographical Dictionary of the Worthies of Ireland, from the earliest periods to the present time in 1819 and 1821. He was also a poet, writing for newspapers and publishing books on poetry, a biographer of poets and playwrights, an editor, a lyricist for popular music and a playwright of several plays in the West End of London.

Richard Ryan lived in Camden Town, London, from 1819 until his death in 1849.

== Early life ==
Oxford Street in 1816. Richard Ryan was born in 1797 in 351 Oxford Street in the background of this view (the brown building on the right above the carriage) to the west of the Pantheon (foreground). The street view with the old numbering can be seen online.

Richard Ryan was the son of bookseller Richard Ryan (1750–1818) and Elizabeth Ryan (1759–1830). He was born at their home in Oxford Street near the Pantheon, London. It was one of several locations on Oxford Street where his father ran a book-selling business for 34 years, from 1784 to 1818. An 1840 street view of the buildings on Oxford Street (including the old numbering), can be seen online.

Richard was his father's only child, but he had three older half brothers: Isaac, Joshua and Aaron Bryant from his mother who was a widow living in Poland Street when she married his father in February 1796. Joshua and Aaron worked in the Oxford Street bookshop: Joshua from 1797 and Aaron from 1799. Joshua Bryant (born c.1782) was an acclaimed artist and map engraver and exhibited at the Royal Academy of Arts from 1798 onwards and also produced illustrations for books, including Buildings on the south side of New Palace Yard in Antiquities of Westminster by John Thomas Smith (engraver) (1807) of which R.Ryan's bookshop was listed as a main seller of the book.

Ryan attended Soho Academy and St Paul's School. He initially worked as a bookseller with his father after leaving school but decided to close the bookshop in 1819, a year after his father died on 29 July 1818, to focus on his writing.

Many London booksellers in the early nineteenth century were book publishers. Richard's father had published extensive catalogues and books over the years and he must have assisted his father in the publication of these once he was old enough. In 1818 he published the third edition of An Essay on the Antiquities of the Irish Language by Charles Vallancey which had originally been published in 1772. He took the opportunity to add a catalogue section at the back of the book with more than 100 listings of Works relative to the History, Antiquities, and the Language of Ireland on sale in his bookshop.

== First Irish biographical dictionary ==
Richard Ryan is known for his biographical books, the best-known being Biographia Hibernica, a Biographical Dictionary of the Worthies of Ireland, from the earliest periods to the present time, 2 vols. 8vo, London. Volume One of the Worthies of Ireland was published in April 1819 and Volume Two in 1821. The two volumes list the biographies of 326 Irish people.

The Worthies of Ireland is regarded as the first general Irish biographical dictionary. Irish poet and Nobel Prize in Literature winner Seamus Heaney mentioned Ryan's efforts at the launch of the Dictionary of Irish Biography in Belfast, Northern Ireland in 2009.

== Poetry and drama ==
Following the success of his first literary effort, Ryan focused on publishing several books of poems and creating biographical dictionaries of his passions: Dramatic Table Talk about the theatre, followed by Poetry and Poets. He continued to write poetry on various subjects for newspapers including The Morning Post and The Lancaster Gazette. In November 1824 the Time's Telescope; The Astronomer's, Botanist's and Naturalist's Guide, for the year 1825 (8vo) featured a 62-page article on English Sacred Poetry by him.

Books written by Richard Ryan about poetry and the theatre included:

- Eight Ballads on the fictions of the ancient Irish and other poems, 8vo, London, 1822.
- Poems on sacred subjects. To which are added several miscellaneous, 12mo, London, 1824. Ryan dedicated this book to his friend Quaker poet Bernard Barton.
- Dramatic Table Talk, or Scenes, Situations, & adventures, serious & comic, in theatrical history & biography, 3 vols, 12mo, London, 1825. Reprinted 1830.
- Poetry and poets, being a collection of the choicest anecdotes relative to the poets of every age and nation; together with specimens of their works, and sketches of their biography, 3 vols. 12mo, London, 1826.

== Published under an alias ==
- The Christian Religion; An Account of Every Sect, its Origin, Progress, Tenets of Belief, and Rites and Ceremonies, Carefully Compiled from the best Authorities, 12mo, London, 1840, reprinted 1843. This book was published under the initials R.R.

== As editor ==
Richard Ryan was editor of one of the earliest books about New Zealand, published in 1832.

It is not known if Ryan travelled further than Ireland, but he was editor of several books about expeditions to countries further afield, including Greece, Australia and New Zealand. In October 1824 he edited and wrote the preface to Greece in 1823 and 1824 by Hon. Colonel Leicester Stanhope, 5th Earl of Harrington which detailed Stanhope's correspondence with the Greek committee in England. Stanhope was with Lord Byron when he died in Greece that year and accompanied Byron's body back to England. Ryan was mentioned in The Morning Chronicle as being given documents relating to the book, by Stanhope. These included "several original letters" written by Byron to Stanhope, as well as some journals written by Stanhope.

Books edited by Richard Ryan include:

- Greece in 1823 and 1824, being a series of letters and other documents on the Greek Revolution, written during a visit to that country to which is added the life of Mustapha Ali , by Colonel Leicester Stanhope, London, 1824.
- A narrative of a nine months' residence in New Zealand in 1827: together with a journal of a residence in Tristan D'Acunha, an island situated between South America and the Cape of Good Hope by Augustus Earle, London, 1832.
- Narrative of a Voyage Round the World, and description of British Settlements on the Coast of New Holland by Thomas Braidwood Wilson, London, 1835.

== Plays ==
Ryan, whose wife Amelia was the daughter of local French-language publisher and bookshop owner Peter Didier, was fluent in the French language. He translated and adapted three plays from French to English in the 1830s, starting with Everybody's Husband which was adapted from "Le Mari de Toutes Les Femmes" in 1831.

His first play, in September 1830, was The Irish Girl. It did not get good reviews on its second run in 1831 and closed early.

Plays written by Ryan, and those translated and adapted from French by him, include:

- The Irish Girl. Performed at the Adelphi Theatre, by the English Opera Company, September 1830 and July 1831
- Everybody's husband a farce in one act also known as Everybody's husband: A comic drama, in one act, London, 1831. Adapted from Le Mari de Toutes Les Femmes. Performed at the Queen's Theatre, Tottenham Street, February 1831.
- Quite at home: a comic entertainment in one act London, 1834. Adapted from Monsieur Sens Gêne. Performed in the Theatre Royal, Haymarket.
- Le pauvre Jacques a vaudeville in one act by Theodore Cogniard, translated from French by Richard Ryan, London, 1836. Performed by the French Company at the St. James's Theatre, July 1836.

Another play submitted to the Lord Chamberlain, London was Second sight: a tale of the Highlands in two acts, 1836. The original manuscript of this play is in the British Library. The Invisible Witness is another play listed as being written by Ryan on the title page of Quite at Home but it is unknown where it was performed.

Ryan wrote the "introductory remarks" to The tailors, (or 'quadrupeds,') a tragedy for warm weather, London, 1836. Performed at the Theatre Royal, Haymarket.

== Lyrics ==
Richard Ryan wrote lyrics to popular songs which were set to music by well known composers. Some were originally written as poems and several were published with music years after he died. The songs with lyrics written by Richard Ryan include:

- "The Love Bird, A Song, Written" by Charles Smith, 1820
- "O saw ye the lass wi'the bonny blue e'en!: as sung by Mr. Sinclair" by John Sinclair, originally published in Eight Ballads, 1822.
- "Whether I rove thro' myrtle bowers: a ballad", by Charles Smith, ca. 1822
- "Oh! Childe me not", "The Fairy's Gift" and "The Fairy-formed Harp: A Ballad" by Charles Smith, (all 1824)]
- "Oh! Take this Rose" by Augustus Meves, 1824
- "It is the day the holy day. A Christmas carol", by William Tebbett, 1824
- "My Mistress is the Sea" By Alexander Roche, 1825
- "The Morn Breaks All Beautiful and Bright" was the celebrated Barcarolle in Auber's Opera of Masaniello. Performed at the Theatre Royal, Drury Lane it was "adapted to English words" by Richard Ryan and arranged for the piano forte by John Barnett in 1828
- "The merry Swiss girl: a Swiss melody" by Thomas Valentine and Thomas A Birch, 1829
- "The fair maid of Perth", the celebrated Scottish ballad sung by Mr. Sinclair at the Nobilities Concerts. Written by Richard Ryan and dedicated by permission to Sir Walter Scott by E. Solis, 1829
- "Stay Time, stay", by E. Solis as listed in The Music Bijou for 1830, printed in The Harmonican, November 1829.
- "I’d Be a Nightingale: Ballad" by E. Solis. Sung by Miss Graddon, c. 1830
- "My bark shall tempt the seas no more: a ballad" by E. Solis
- "There is a tide" by E. Solis in "The musical forget me not, a cabinet of music and poetry, for MDCCCXXXI" by Thomas Macinlay, London, 1831
- "O'er the waters row: a celebrated song" by Jonathan Blewitt (1782–1853), ca. 1840
- "The Flying Dutchman" by John Parry, 1840
- "A set of six vocals" The poetry by J.E. Carpenter (1813–1885) & Richard Ryan, music composed by John Barnett (1802–1890).
- "The Jolly Skiffsman" arranged and composed by G.A. Hodson. Published by D'Almaine & Co., [ca. 1845?].
- Written for Stephen Glover (composer) was "A Voice from the Waves, duet", released in January 1849. Another song written in 1849 for Stephen Glover was "Music and her sister song: duett" and "Happy Days, duett" "There's a sweet wild rose: duet" was set to a ballad by Stephen Glover in 1856 and 1871
- "Awake, awake the flowers unfold: 'Address to the flowers'", by J. McMurdie, published 1869.
- "Oh tell me where the roses twine, a song", by George Chapman, 18--?

== Personal life ==
=== Worthies of Ireland ===
In a journal entry from early 1819 (pictured above) Ryan writes:

I was born in Oxford Street London, on 18 April 1797 in which street my father kept a bookselling establishment for upwards of thirty years. My education I received partly at Soho Square Academy and partly at St Paul's School which latter "Garden of Knowledge" I was removed from to assist my father in his business. When it came to be my own, by the demise of my father in July 1818, I declined following, having initiated a taste for Literary Composition and which I cultivated by writing pieces of Poetry on various subjects for the newspapers – these were the produce of my leisure hours. My more important literary pursuit being to compile and write a work of Irish Biography in 3 vols (each volume to be published separately) to be called "A Biographical Dictionary of the Worthies of Ireland" which I propose that contain the lives of every native of Ireland celebrated in his own or other countries of whom accounts are to be found by considerable research, or are to be supplied by my writing to several distinguished literary characters in Ireland to whom I had the letter of introduction from various quarters. Of this work prior to commencing it, I had dreamt rather a "golden dream" ...

Three pages of the journal were saved by his family along with many newspaper clippings of his poems that were kept by him at the time, several of which were submitted (or published) anonymously, or under the initials R.R., but subsequently signed. Also in the journal he describes people who he was contacting to write the Worthies of Ireland.

In the next entry in the journal, written presumably in 1821 but undated, he writes: "I now for the first time in my life began to think that I shant not clear a fortune by my first literary undertaking." He describes how the first volume was printed "with a fine portrait of John Philpot Curran..." Regarding the sale of the first volume of Worthies of Ireland he writes: "I sent a quantity of copies to Ireland where I expected it would have the greatest sale – but there it met with little or none. In this country it sold much better – but the sale in both countries was such as to make me determined never to complete the work. This determination however I was induced to change two years approximately afterwards by my printer consenting to take the expenses on himself provided I would finish the work in one more volume. This I agreed to do...". Five editions of both volumes were published in 1821 and 1822 and are held by 37 libraries worldwide.

=== Camden Town ===
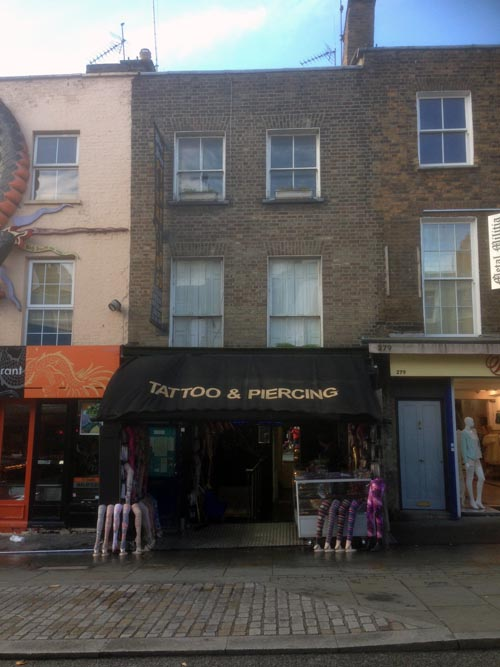
277 Camden High Street in 2013. Richard Ryan lived here with his family from 1825 to early 1830.

After closing down the Oxford Street bookshop, Richard Ryan moved to 2 Upper Park Street, Camden Town (renamed and numbered 50 Park Street in around 1823 and now 28 Parkway), at the end of 1818 with his mother and two other family members, John and Mary Ryan. He married Amelia Cecilia Didier (1803–74) at St Marylebone Parish Church, Westminster in May 1822. They were living in Cork when their first child Richard Jr was born in early 1823. On return to London in mid 1823 they lived in Park Street Camden Town with his mother and other family members until January 1825, before moving to their own house at 6 Adams Terrace (now 277 Camden High Street). Of the three addresses in Camden Town that Ryan lived in, 277 Camden High Street is the only original building still standing. His second and third sons, Edmund and Alfred, were born there in 1825 and 1827.

Richard Ryan and his family returned to live in 50 Park Street after the death of his mother in February 1830. His first daughter Elizabeth Bridget died in 1833 at the age of two and his son Alfred died of Smallpox in 1838. His final child was Jane (1834–1915) who later married to become Jane Armitt and later Jane May.

=== Debt ===
In March 1835 he was jailed in King's Bench Prison, Southwark, for debt and his family's situation was described in letters to the Literary Fund by Ryan's referees as 'critical' as they had lost everything, including their furniture, with neighbours lending them beds. The Literary Fund paid the debt, releasing him from prison. Despite some success as an editor, playwright and writer between 1835 and his death in 1849 the Fund helped him again in the 1840s. The applications to the Fund, held in the British Library, have revealed several previously uncredited works by Ryan.

In around 1844 he sold the family home and moved into rented accommodation at 5 Pratt Street, Camden Town (now number 9). His eldest son Richard Jr had a "paralysis-type disability", possibly autism, living at home unable to work until around 1846, or in accommodation nearby, until 1849. Richard Jr married Maria Hall in May 1846 and produced Richard Ryan's first grandchild, Elizabeth, in 1847.

=== Thomas Crofton Croker ===
One of his friends was the Irish writer Thomas Crofton Croker (1798–1854) who moved to London from Ireland in 1818. Croker, who was almost the same age at Ryan, is known for his extensive research into ancient Irish folklore. Croker helped Ryan with contacts and accommodation when Ryan lived in Croker's hometown of Cork in 1822 and 1823. Ryan maintained a friendship with him for more than 30 years. Ten letters from Richard Ryan and one from Elizabeth Ryan to Croker written between 1822 and 1845 are in Cork Library Archives. They show a personal connection with Croker's family in Cork and also of Croker with Ryan's family in Camden Town. The first letters from Richard, posted from Cork to London, written in June 1822 – March 1823, referred to the recent wedding in London in May 1822. In 1827 Elizabeth, Richard's mother, sold her late husband's extensive collection of books about Ireland to Croker for £50, and wrote to him following the sale. When Ryan was jailed in 1835 for debt he continued to write poetry and prose for publication from the prison, sending articles to Croker and asking him to forward them to Fraser's Magazine. He also asked for advice about applying to the Literary Fund as Croker was a member of the Fund's board.

=== Death ===
Ryan had a heart attack in early September 1849 and died seven weeks later on 20 October. He was buried in the 19th century cemetery for St James's Church, Piccadilly, on 25 October 1849. The cemetery became St James's Gardens, Camden, in 1878 with only a few gravestones lining the edges of the gardens. His remains may have been moved when part of the gardens, which are located between Hampstead Road and Euston Station, were built over when Euston Station was expanded. St James's Gardens were closed in August 2017 in preparation for the expansion of Euston Station. His obituary in The Gentleman's Magazine in January 1850 gave an account of his literary successes, saying he had "devoted himself to literature from his early years, elevated it with success in several of its departments for nearly thirty years" but ended with a description of his final years: "We believe he was himself a bookseller at one period; but for many years past he was entirely dependent on his literary exertions, and finally sunk under the pressure of pecuniary distress and a broken constitution, leaving a widow in great distress." The words in the newspaper were almost identical to those giving approval for the last payment made by the Literary Fund to his widow after his death.

== Posthumous success ==
Richard Ryan was acknowledged for his biographical work in the British Dictionary of National Biography in 1895.

His lyrics continued to be published for several years after his death. Published in his final year of life in 1849, "A Voice from the Waves" was written to music by Stephen Glover, an answer to a popular duet "What are the Wild Waves Saying".

A Voice from the Waves in the dead of night
alto
A voice from the waves in the dead of night,
Sung melodious o'er my pillow,
As I lay on my couch in slumber light,
Lull'd to rest by the heaving billow!
It spoke not of human hopes and fears,
That o'ercloud time's hours flying,
But it told of the dead of former years
That in ocean's bed were lying!

A voice from the waves in the dead of night
Sung melodious o'er my pillow,
As I lay on my couch in slumber light,
Lull'd to rest by the heaving billow!
Lull'd to rest,
Lull'd to rest by the heaving, the heaving billow!

duett
And thus it sung,
And thus it sung,
The voice the voice from the waves,
And thus it sung,
And thus it sung,
And thus, thus it sung
I come from the deep,

soprano
I come from the deep, I come from the deep,
Where the seaflower gently uncloses,
Where fiery youth hath a dreamless sleep,
And the warrior in calmness reposes
Where the parent and child lie side by side,
Doom'd by destiny ne'er to sever;
Where the husband fond, and his new made bride,
In death's embrace are clasp'd forever!

Each wave rolls over the burial place
Of earth's children in countless numbers,
Of ev'ry hue, and clime, and race
Where no tempest can break their slumbers.
Of ev'ry hue, and clime, and race
Where no tempest can break their slumbers.

duett
The voice was hush'd, the vision fled,
But my heart felt a pang of sorrow,
Till the daystar o'er me, her bright beams shed,
Commencing a glorious morrow!
'Till the daystar o'er me, her bright beams shed,
Commencing a glorious morrow,
Commencing, commencing a glorious, a glorious morrow.
The voice was hush'd, the vision fled.
The voice was hush'd, the vision fled.
