= Jack Barton (disambiguation) =

Jack Barton may refer to:

- Jack Barton, English rugby league player
- Jack Barton (footballer, born 1895) (1895–1962), English footballer for Blackburn Rovers and Rochdale
- Jack Barton (actor), English actor

== See also ==
- John Barton (disambiguation)
