= Eynesbury, Cambridgeshire =

Area of St Neots, Cambridgeshire, England

Coordinates: 52.218°N 0.266°W

Eynesbury
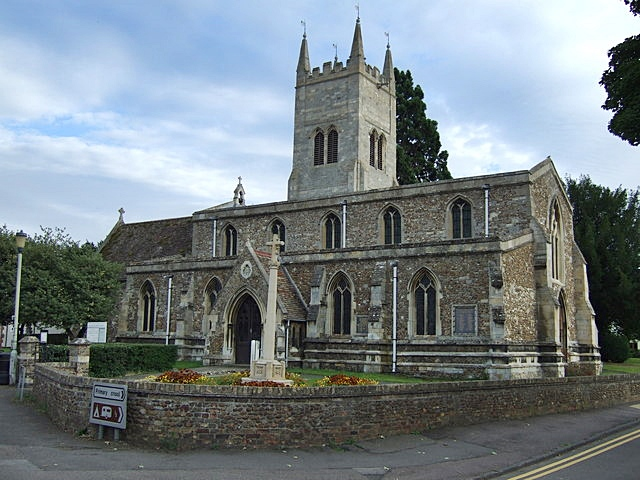
- St Mary's Church, Eynesbury

- Location within Cambridgeshire
- Civil parish: St Neots
- District: Huntingdonshire
- Shire county: Cambridgeshire
- Region: East
- Country: England
- Sovereign state: United Kingdom
- Post town: ST NEOTS
- Postcode district: PE19
- Dialling code: 01480
- Police: Cambridgeshire
- Fire: Cambridgeshire
- Ambulance: East of England
- UK Parliament: Huntingdon

Eynesbury is an urban area in the civil parish of St Neots, in the Huntingdonshire district of Cambridgeshire, England. It mainly consists of housing, although there is an area of light industry, and a large supermarket. In addition there is a large area of open grassland and a caravan park.

Up until the time of the Norman Conquest in 1066, Eynesbury included the area north of Hen Brook which is now St Neots. It was the fame of the relics of the Cornish monk, St Neot that caused the area near the Priory where his remains were kept, that caused that part of the town to become called St Neots.

== General description ==
Eynesbury is an area of housing, and industrial and commercial buildings, now forming part of St Neots in Cambridgeshire. It lies to the east of the River Great Ouse, to the south of Hen Brook, and to the north-west of the A428 road (St Neots by-pass). It has a range of local shops for necessities and a small number of specialist shops, as well as a large supermarket. There is a post office and two convenience stores. More general shopping opportunities have migrated to St Neots town centre, although the supermarket is used by shoppers from the whole of St Neots and surrounding rural areas. Some light and medium industry is located along Cromwell Road. Residential housing has been built in recent years particularly around the area north of the Tesco supermarket.

Agricultural land lies to the east between the railway line and the A428 by-pass, but this is likely to be dedicated to housing in the coming years. A considerable area of amenity grassland lies in the curve of the River Great Ouse, in an area known as Pocket Park.

In the 1960s Eynesbury was subject to a considerable expansion in housing, as part of the London overspill scheme. A number of infill housing construction plans have been completed more recently. By contrast the Chequers Public House is considered to be the oldest building in Eynesbury.

Eynesbury is home to Ernulf Academy.

Eynesbury has a Non-League football club Eynesbury Rovers F.C., which play at Alfred Hall Memorial Ground.

The Coneygeare area (Note: There is a Coneygear area in Huntingdon, which is quite distinct from the Eynesbury location.) next to the Coneygeare bridge over the River Great Ouse has a council-operated children's play area, and nearby is St Neots Camping and Caravanning Club Site.

== Early history ==
=== Stone and Bronze Age ===
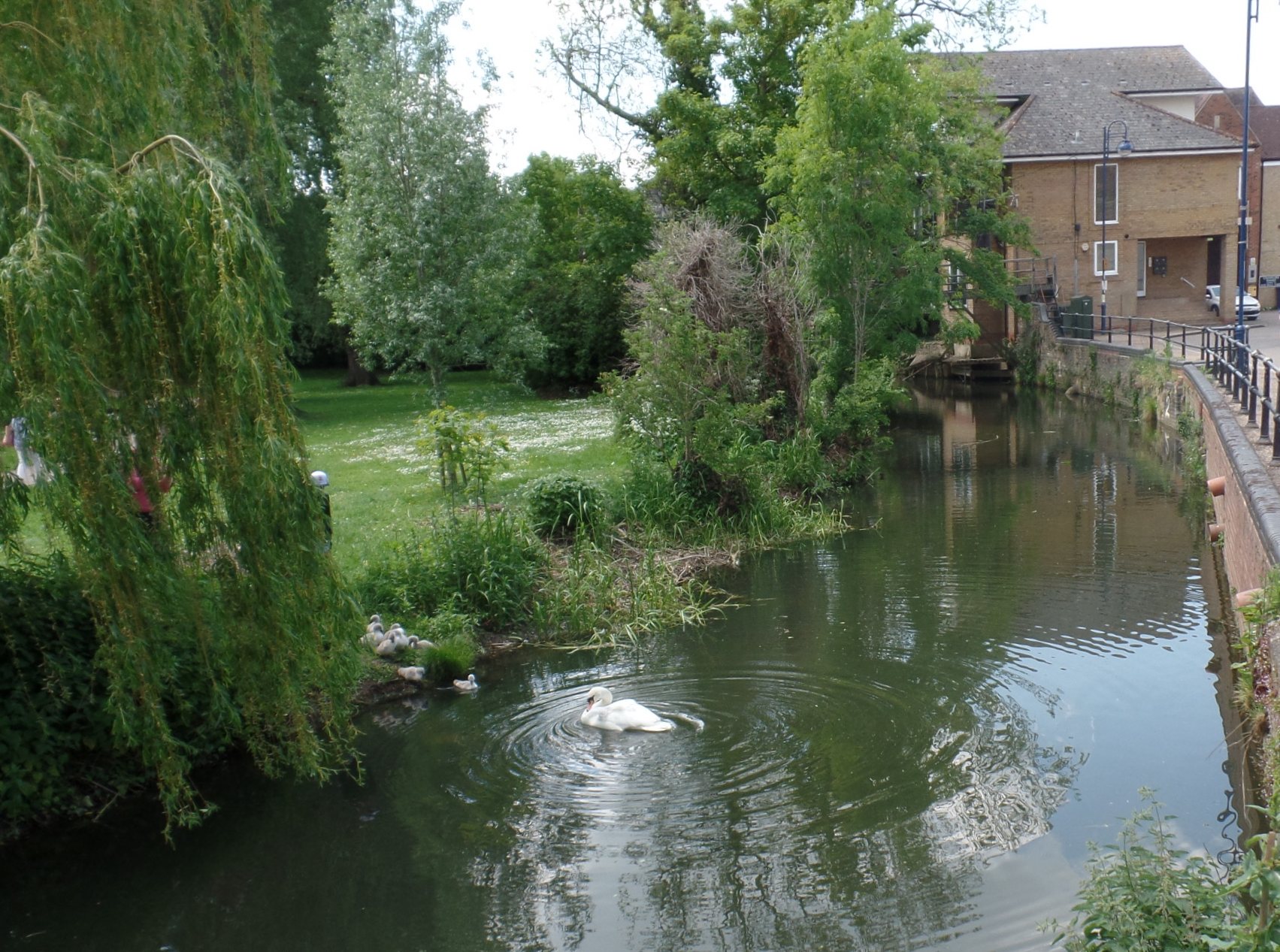
Hen Brook; it forms the boundary between Eynesbury (left) and St Neots (right)

There is evidence of Bronze Age occupation just south of Montague Square, in present-day Eynesbury. Iron Age occupation has left evidence too, in the area occupied by Eynesbury School's games fields, and near Howitts Lane. They were Belgic tribesmen from the Continent who conquered this part of the country in the century or so before the Roman invasion, and brought with them improved farming techniques.

=== Roman period ===
A Roman road passed close to the east of present-day Eynesbury and St Neots. It connected the Roman military stations of Sandy and Godmanchester. It ran about north - south and crossed the present-day A428 road (St Neots by-pass to Cambridge main road) just east of the roundabout where the B1428 joins it at Wintringham roundabout. A small Roman outpost was located a short distance to the west of that point, and a possible trading post has been identified in Eynesbury itself. Tebbutt speculates that Eynesbury may have been a location for loading agricultural produce onto river vessels for transport to other Roman locations. The settlement probably extended along the Great Ouse from the ford (near the site of the present-day road bridge) to the Coneygeare area.

=== Anglo-Saxon ===
A settlement existed in Eynesbury in the middle of the 8th century AD, and possibly earlier, known by some variation of its present-day name. From that time, part of the inhabitation was in what is now St Neots, but then considered part of Eynesbury. A village called Burg, or Bury, may have existed here in still earlier times. There was a ford of the River Great Ouse at that time.

The name Eynesbury is a corruption of Ernulph's-Bury, abbreviated into Ern'sbury, or else a corruption of Ainulph's-Bury contracted into Ain’sbury: the village was therefore Ernulph's Borough, or Ainulph's Borough; however the identity of Ernulph or Ainulph is unknown. The most likely explanation is that Ernulph who lived here and died about the middle of the 8th century.

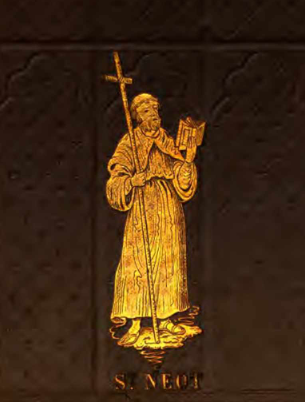
Saint Neot

A hermit named Neot had founded a monastery in the Cornish village now known as St Neot. He became extremely famous for his piety and wisdom, and for miraculous events associated with him. In 877 AD he died, and his remains were housed at the monastery he had founded, and the monastery and the relics became the object of pilgrimage.

About 975 AD a nobleman and landowner named Leofric (alternatively Earl Alric) and his wife Leofleda (alternatively Countess Ethelfleda) had acquired extensive lands in Eynesbury; the name still included the area north of the Hen Brook now called St Neots. They soon founded a priory in what is now St Neots, close to the River Great Ouse. A priory could be a lucrative asset if it was of high religious repute, attracting pilgrims, and their money. Leofric and Leofleda needed the relics of a notable holy person as their patron, and Neot was their choice. They arranged to abstract his remains and brought them to their priory, where they were placed in a shrine.

=== Norman conquest ===
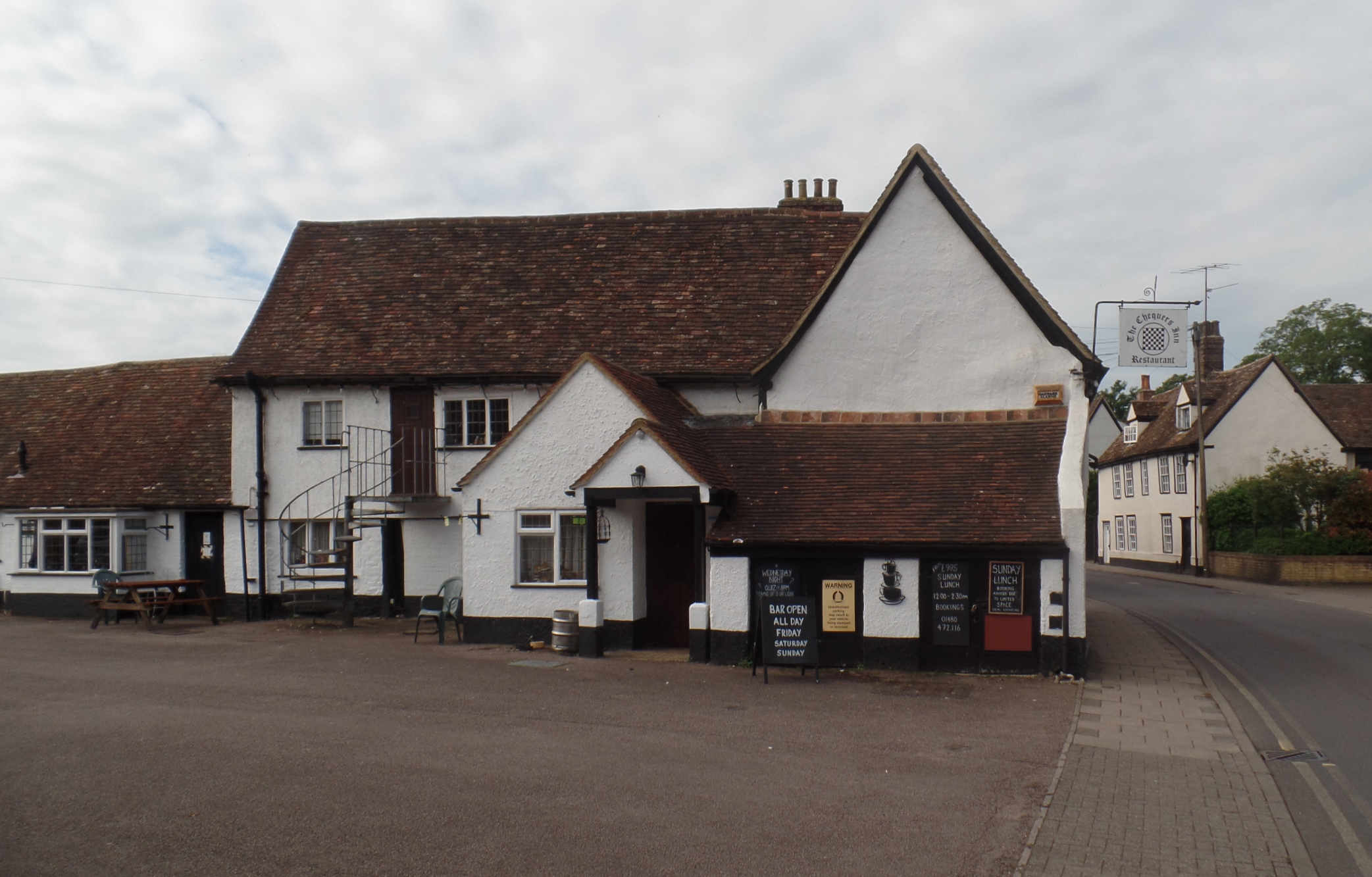
The Chequers Inn, Eynesbury

In 1066 William the Conqueror defeated the Anglo-Saxon defenders at the Battle of Hastings, and this resulted (after a struggle) in William becoming King. In 1085 William the Conqueror ordered that a survey of building and land ownership and value should be carried out, and this resulted in what is now known as the Domesday Book.

Eynesbury was listed in the Domesday Book as being in the Toseland Hundred in Huntingdonshire; the name of the Eynesbury was written as Einuluesberiam and Einuluesberie in the Domesday Book. In 1086 there were two manors at Eynesbury; the annual rent paid to the lords of the manors in 1066 had been £44 and the rent had increased to £47 in 1086.

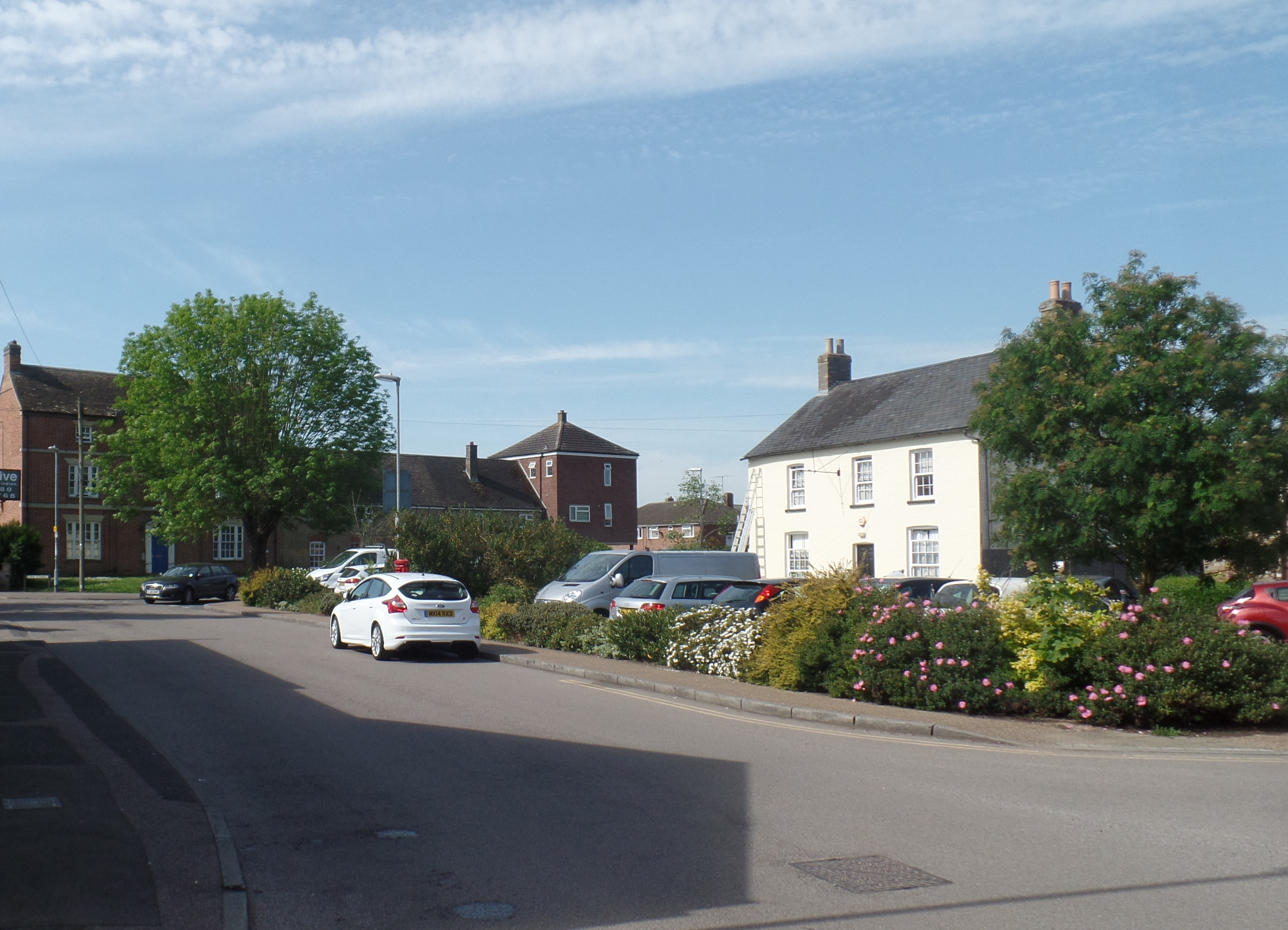
Montagu Square, Eynesbury

The Domesday Book records that there were 76 households in Eynesbury in 1086, suggesting that the population was between 266 and 380 persons.

The Domesday Book uses units of measure for land area such as hide and ploughland. These were terms for the area of land that a team of eight oxen could plough in a single season and are equivalent to 120 acres (49 hectares); this was the amount of land that was considered to be sufficient to support a single family. By 1086, the hide had become a unit of tax assessment rather than an actual land area; a hide was the amount of land that could be assessed as £1 for tax purposes. The survey records that there were 52.5 ploughlands at Eynesbury in 1086 and that there was the capacity for a further 2.5 ploughlands. In addition to the arable land, there was 133.5 acres (54 hectares) of meadows, 60 acres (24 hectares) of woodland, three watermills and a fishery at Eynesbury.

The tax assessment in the Domesday Book was known as geld or danegeld and was a type of land-tax based on the hide or ploughland. It was originally a way of collecting a tribute to pay off the Danes when they attacked England. Following the Norman Conquest, the geld was used to raise money for the King and to pay for continental wars; by 1130, the geld was being collected annually. Having determined the value of a manor's land and other assets, a tax in proportion to value was levied on the land holder. While this was typically two shillings in the pound the amount did vary; for example, in 1084 it was as high as six shillings in the pound. For the manors at Eynesbury the total tax assessed was 24 geld. By 1086 there was already a church and a priest at Eynesbury.

=== Geographical extent ===
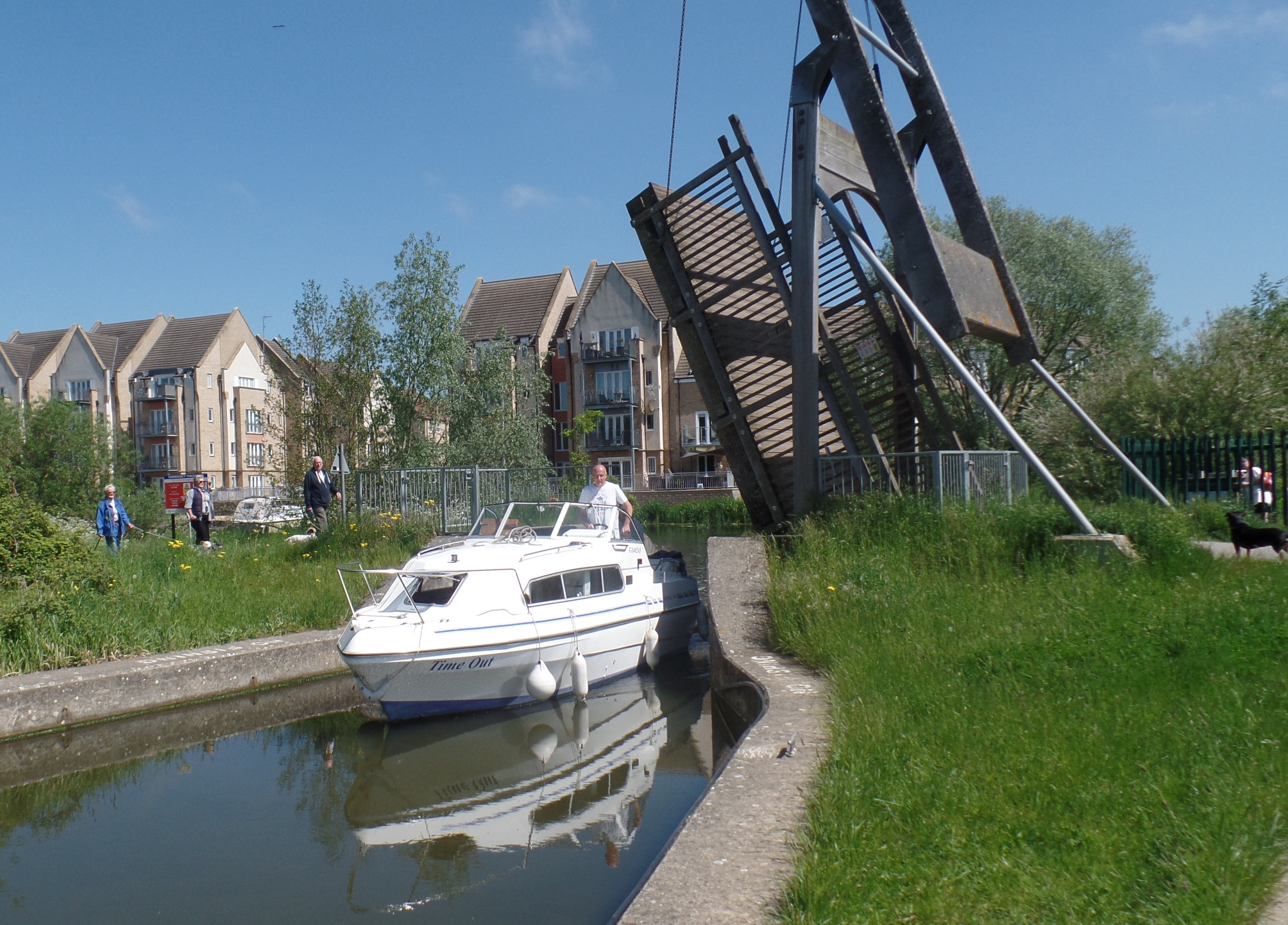
A boat leaving Eynesbury Marina

At the time of the Domesday Book (1086 AD) the name "Eynesbury" (or its alternative spellings) included all of present-day Eynesbury and St Neots, as well as agricultural land to the east towards Croxton and Abbotsley. As the fame of the Priory of St Neot became widespread in the twelfth century, the name St Neots took hold for the immediate area, and "In honor of the Saint the name of the place was changed to Neots-bury." In time this became "St Neots", and the extent of Eynesbury was correspondingly reduced. After 1113 AD this was formalised, and Abbotsley too was separated off, about 1138 AD.

== Development of Eynesbury ==
The Parish Church of St Mary dates back to the 12th century and was rebuilt in 1688 and restored in 1857. It is a Grade II* listed building.

The manor of Eynesbury was held by the Ferrers and Devereux family (later Viscounts Hereford), until 1571, when it was sold to Sir James Dyer whose family sold it to Sir Sidney Montagu in 1639. His family, later Earls of Sandwich, gave their name to Montagu Street in the village.

Caldecote Manor was acquired by the Haberdashers Company in 1624.

Thomas Barton, chaplain to Prince Rupert, was rector of Eynesbury from 1629 to 1631.

The parish was enclosed by the Eynesbury Inclosure Act 1797 (37 Geo. 3. c. 148 Pr.).

William Cole, the antiquary, was rector from 1768 to 1808.

In 1876, the village of Eynesbury and part of the rural parish were included in the district controlled by the Local Board of St Neots. A further rearrangement was made in 1895, when Eynesbury was divided into two civil parishes. The urban portion of 394 acres was now called the parish of Eynesbury, and included in the St Neots Urban District; the rest, with 2,641 acres of land, formed the parish of Eynesbury Hardwick.

== Modern history ==
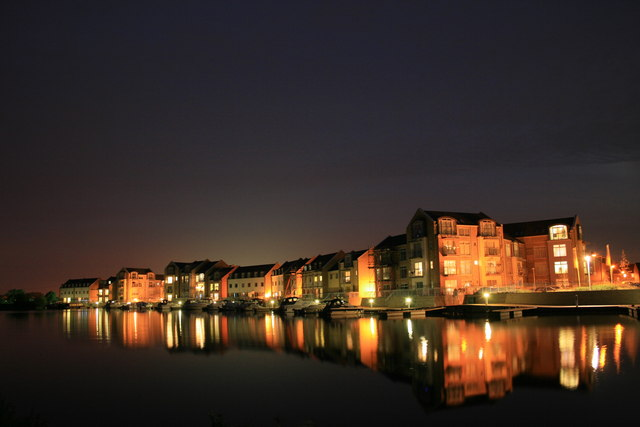
Eynesbury Manor Marina and housing

In the period following 1945, government attention was given to the poor condition of housing in the Greater London area, and a series of measures classified as London overspill were implemented. This resulted in Eynesbury being selected for considerable expansion of council housing. The areas around Hardwick Road, Duck Lane, Sandfields Road, Howitts Gardens and Potton Road absorbed much of the migration from London.

Following the Education Act 1944 an expansion of secondary education took place. Neither Eynesbury nor Eaton Socon had enough pupils to justify a St Neots grammar school; at the time Eaton Socon was in Bedfordshire. It was not until 1960 that a secondary school was established in St Neots. It was only with the establishment of Longsands and Ernulf comprehensive schools in 1966 and 1971 that a full secondary education provision was made in St Neots.

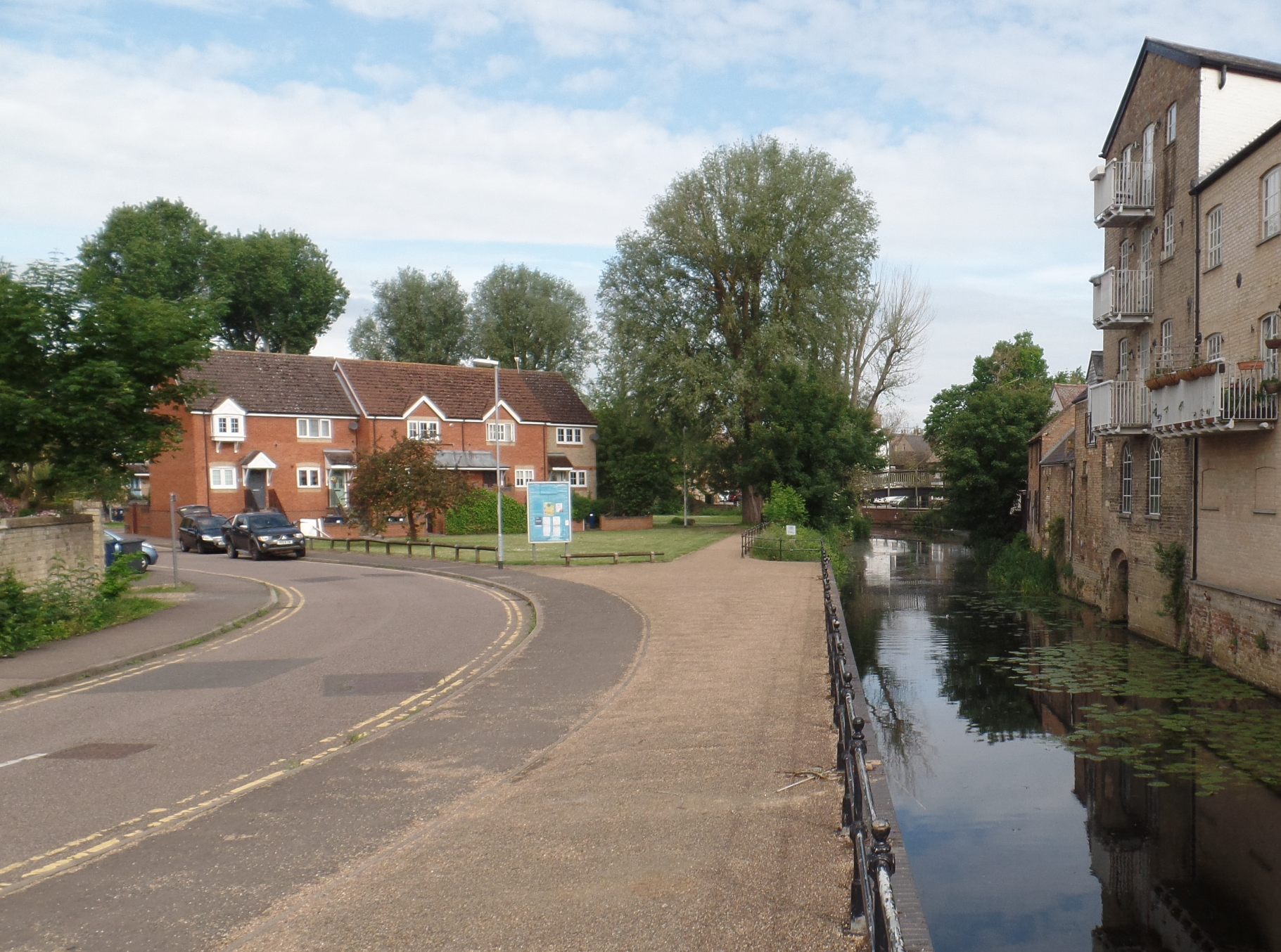
Navigation Wharf, Eynesbury

In the early 1960s serious proposals were put forward to reorganise the areas controlled by local government in the area. As it seemed likely that Huntingdonshire would be disbanded, it was repeatedly said by some that St Neots and Eynesbury would prefer to join Bedfordshire rather than Cambridgeshire, as the town had limited affinity with the fen towns. A counterargument was that Bedfordshire had done little to improve Eaton Socon, whereas Huntingdon had done much to improve St Neots.

On 1 April 1965, Huntingdonshire was combined with the Soke of Peterborough to form an enlarged county. In 1974 Huntingdonshire and the Soke of Peterborough, as it was named, was finally merged with Cambridgeshire and the Isle of Ely, the entire new county being known as Cambridgeshire. Huntingdonshire County Council therefore disappeared in 1974, and it was replaced by the Huntingdon District Council, later renamed Huntingdonshire District Council, which functions as a unit within the enlarged county of Cambridgeshire. The boundaries of the HDC were very similar to those of the former county of Huntingdonshire, with the addition of Eaton Ford and Eaton Socon. In 1973 St Neots was granted power to create St Neots Town Council, to perpetuate some of the powers for the former St Neots Urban District Council, now abolished.

In the 1980s the Parklands estate was built, expanding Andrew Road and filling the gap between Potton Road and Barford Road. Most recently, the Eynesbury Manor development, which includes Eynesbury Marina, has been built between Ernulf Academy and the Tesco supermarket near the bypass; it stretches to the River Great Ouse to the west.

== Government ==
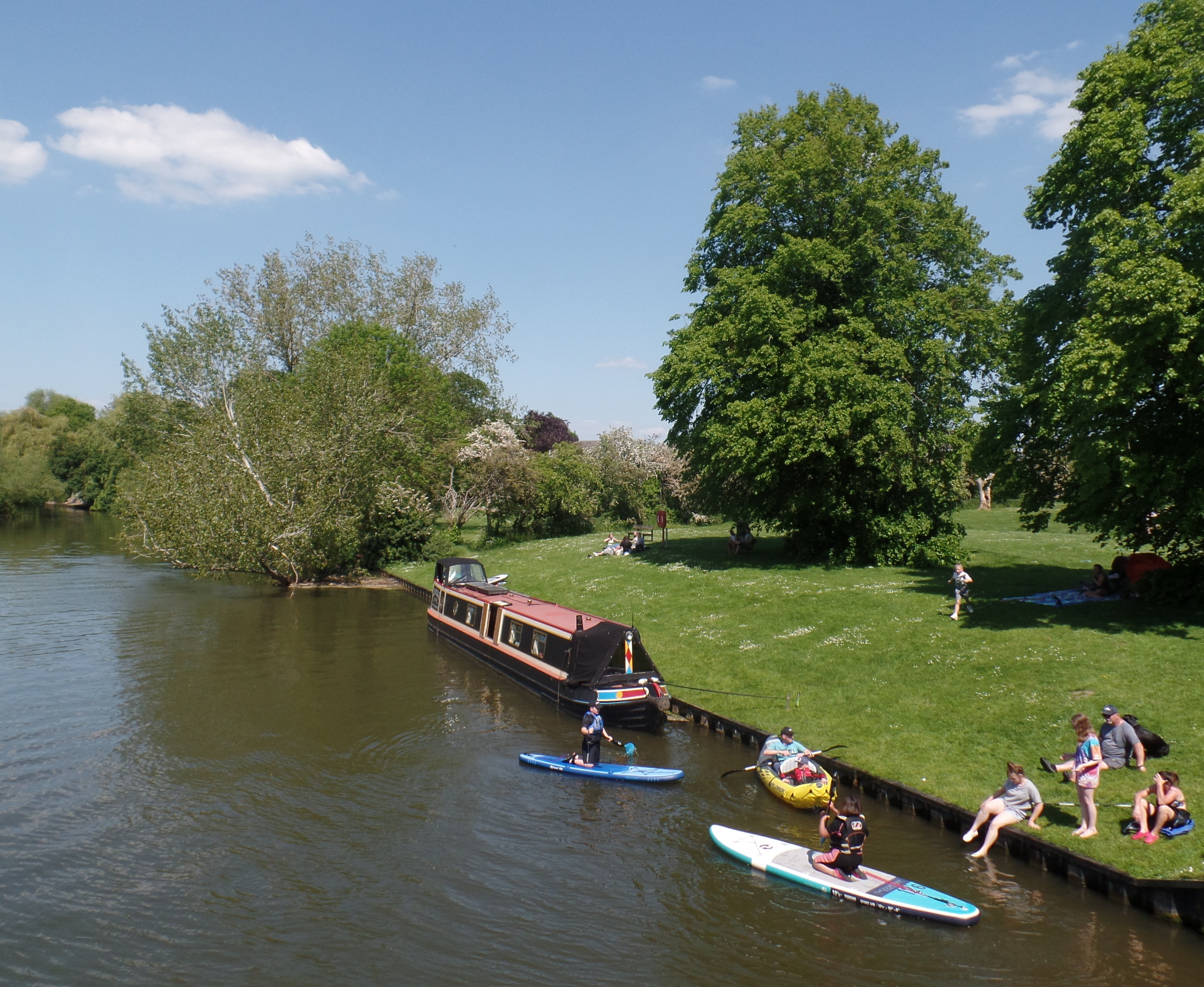
The Coneygeare, Eynesbury

St Neots Town Council Services are burials, grass cutting, play areas, public toilets, bins, committee meetings, events, and community centres.

Town Councillors for Eynesbury are (at 2021) Diana Collins, Emma Speed, Justin Cooper-Marsh (also an HDC member, below) Douglas Terry and Caroline Green.

Huntingdonshire District Council provides services such as building regulation enforcement, local planning, environmental health, leisure and tourism. Eynesbury is a part of the district ward of St Neots Eynesbury and is represented on the district council by three councillors, elected in May 2018 for four year terms: Barry Sidney Banks, Justin Christopher Cooper-Marsh and Douglas Terry, all of the Putting St Neots Residents First Party.

Cambridgeshire County Council, which has administration buildings in Cambridge, provides services such as major road infrastructure, fire and rescue, education, social services, libraries and heritage services. Eynesbury is in the St Neots Eynesbury division of the County Council, and the seat is held by Simone Taylor, a St Neots Independent Group member.

There is a Cambridgeshire and Peterborough Combined Authority. It consists of a directly elected mayor and the seven relevant local authorities (referred to as the Constituent Councils) and the Business Board (Local Enterprise Partnership). The Combined Authority Board consists of the mayor, the leaders of those bodies, and the Cambridgeshire & Peterborough Police & Crime Commissioner and representatives from the Cambridgeshire & Peterborough Fire Authority and the Cambridgeshire & Peterborough Clinical Commissioning Group. The mayor is Dr Nik Johnson (Labour).

Eynesbury was within the Huntingdon parliamentary constituency until the 2024 election, last represented in the House of Commons by Jonathan Djanogly (Conservative). Following the 2023 Periodic Review of Westminster constituencies, it was placed within St Neots and Mid Cambridgeshire, which returned Ian Sollom (Liberal Democrats) as MP at the 2024 United Kingdom general election.

The Police and Crime commissioner is Darryl Preston (Conservative).

=== Past changes ===
Following the Local Government Act 1888 the County of Huntingdonshire was established for the purposes of local government. Throughout the first half of the twentieth century this was regarded as too small to be viable, and after some abortive proposals, the new County of Huntingdon and Peterborough was established on 1 April 1965.

Eynesbury was in the historic and administrative county of Huntingdonshire until 1965. In that year the administrative powers of the county of Huntingdonshire were abolished, and the new administrative county of Huntingdon and Peterborough took control. Then in 1974, following the Local Government Act 1972, Eynesbury became a part of the county of Cambridgeshire. In 1951 the parish had a population of 1348.

The civil parish was Eynesbury Hardwicke, which included the rural area extending eastward nearly to Croxton. In 2009 a further change was made, acknowledging the reality that St Neots was a single entity, having absorbed the urban part of Eynesbury as well as the Eatons. Eynesbury Hardwicke Civil Parish was abolished, and the area was divided between the existing St Neots Civil Parish and Abbotsley Civil Parish.

== Parish church ==
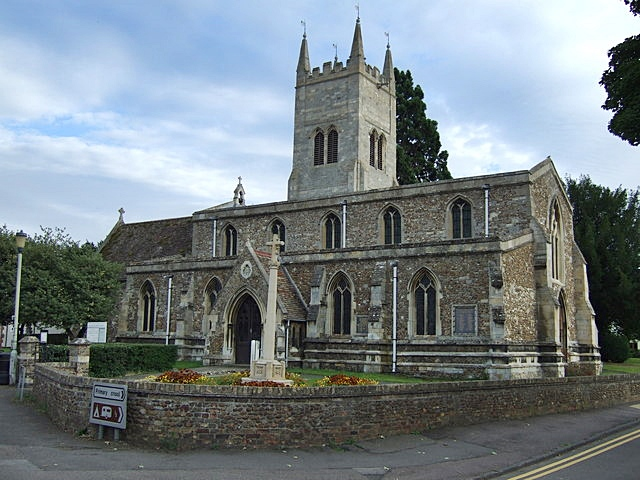
Church of St Mary the Virgin, Eynesbury

The parish church of Eynesbury is the church of St Mary the Virgin. (Note: St Neots and Eaton Socon, nearby, also have churches with the same dedication.) It was described by Betjeman in 1958:

Haphazard growth assimilating Norman and Pointed work (of three different periods), massive 'gothic survival' tower of 1688 south side, and chancel reshaped by Victorians. Sacrifice of old east window over the chancel arch made east end unnecessarily dark; playfully carved benches from 1500s in north aisle; late 17th century pulpit.

On 1 March 2020, the two ecclesiastical parishes of Eynesbury and St Neots became the single parish of St Neots with Eynesbury: both churches are parish churches of the whole parish.

The church is a grade II* Listed Building.

The church purportedly received the body of Saint Myron of Crete in the 5th century, about 100 years after his death.

== Coneygeare ancient earthwork ==
There was a large Roman camp at Coneygeare, a riverside location in Eynesbury. It extended from the present-day Luke Street to Hardwick Road and to the River Ouse and the Coneygeare bridge.

Gorham, writing in 1820, referred to this, and an update was provided by Ladds in 1926:

Most of the site has been dug for gravel, but a considerable portion of the western side is now occupied as allotment gardens and here although it much eroded by the plough the lines of the vallum can still be distinctly seen. At the western corner the outer angle of the bank is very clear and stands up some 5 feet above the surrounding ground but the inner line has been lost, doubtless by the cutting away of the vallum itself. From this point the northern vallum has been lost owing to gravel digging... on the western side the vallum... also stands some 5 feet above the surrounding ground and on the inside the land falls away with a gentle slope to the middle of the enclosure... The earthworks undoubtedly extended across the grass fields eastward of the field just referred to but there is little if anything which can be identified.

It would seem likely that the present road follows the shape of the eastern and northern sides of the enclosure, and the houses probably occupy the site of the vallum. At the North East corner of the allotments and extending across the occupation road leading to the grass field. A considerable Ridge may still be seen: it rises about 2 feet 6 inches above the ground and is apparently a roadway running through the enclosure.

The housing built at Hardwick Road and nearby has obliterated the site in more recent times.

== Notable people ==
=== The St Neots Quads ===
In 1935 quadruplets were born to Mr and Mrs Miles, in Eynesbury. This caused a media sensation at the time, and they were the first British quadruplets to survive more than a few days. As they were very premature, the family doctor arranged for special medical care to be put in place in his own home at first. They were in demand for publicity purposes throughout their childhood and appeared several newsreels. In fact they are alive at the present day (2021) and are the oldest quadruplets in the world.

=== The Eynesbury Giant ===
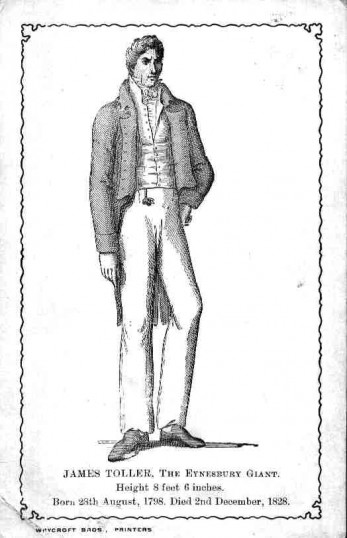
James Toller, the "Eynesbury Giant"

James Toller was born in Eynesbury in 1798. He grew to be 8 ft 1 1/2 inches (2.475m) tall, although some sources claim 8 ft 6 in (2.59 m). His parents were of ordinary stature. By the age of eighteen years he had grown to be over eight feet (2.4 m) in height, and his feet were 15 inches in length.

In those days his height was regarded as an extraordinary phenomenon, and he became famous; he was presented in London to the Emperor of Russia and the King of Prussia. After touring the country in a show, he enlisted in the Life Guards, but his health was poor, and he left the army and returned home to Eynesbury.

He died on the 4 February 1818, at the age of 20. His family feared that his body might be stolen by body-snatchers after burial, and he was interred within Eynesbury church rather than in the churchyard. There seems to be no tablet in the church to indicate the location of his remains.

Many stories have been told about James Toller since his death about how he could walk along the streets of St Neots and Eynesbury and chat with people through their bedroom windows, or pass by the public houses along the high street and reach up and swing the signboards.
