= Andy Barton =

Andy Barton may refer to:

- Andy Barton (wrestler); see Irish Whip Wrestling
- Andy Barton (footballer), NZ footballer; see 2010–11 ASB Premiership
- Andy Barton (racing driver); see 1978 British Formula One season

== See also ==
- Andrew Barton (disambiguation)
