= Bernard Barton =

English Quaker poet (1784–1849)

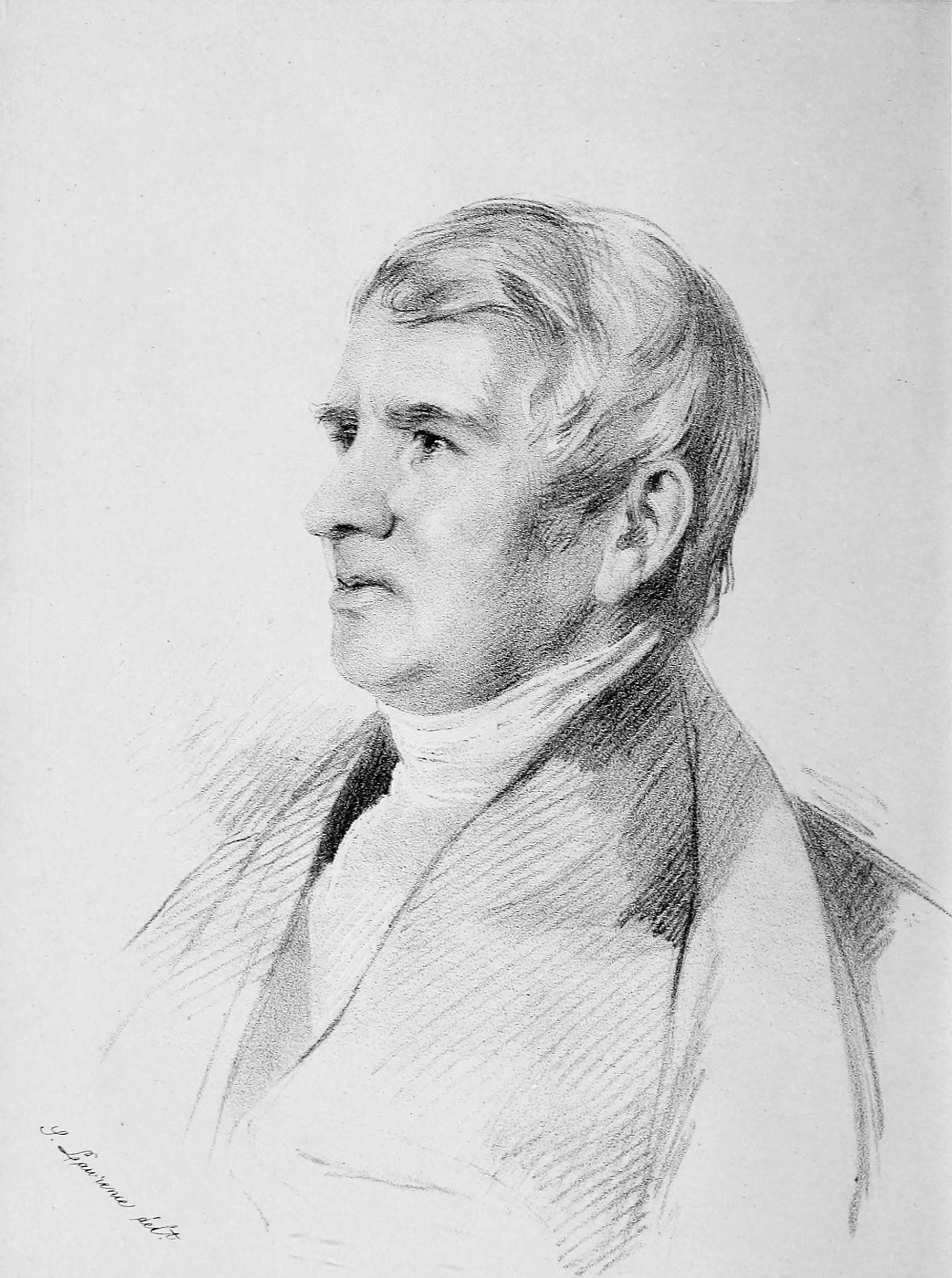
- Born: 31 January 1784; Carlisle, Cumberland (now Cumbria), England
- Died: 19 February 1849 (aged 65)
- Occupations: poet, clerk
- Notable work: The Convict's Appeal (1818); Household Verses (1845)

Bernard Barton (31 January 1784 – 19 February 1849) was known as the Quaker poet. His main works included The Convict's Appeal (1818), in which he protested against the death penalty and the severity of the criminal code.

== Family ==
Bernard Barton was born at Carlisle on 31 January 1784, the son of Quaker parents: John Barton (1755–1789) and his wife, Mary, née Done (1752–1784). His mother died, and while the boy was still an infant, his father, a manufacturer, married Elizabeth Horne (1760–1833), moved to London, and then engaged in the malting business at Hertford. After John Barton died, his widow and stepchildren moved to Tottenham. Barton's sister was the educational writer Maria Hack and his half-brother John Barton, an economist. He was educated at a Quaker school in Ipswich.

Barton was apprenticed at the age of 14 to a shopkeeper in Halstead, Essex, whose daughter, Lucy Jesup (1781–1808), he married in 1807. His wife died at the end of their first year of marriage, while giving birth to their daughter Lucy. After a year as a tutor in Liverpool, Barton spent the rest of his life at Woodbridge, Suffolk, for the most part as a clerk in Messrs Alexander's Bank. He died on 19 February 1849.

== Works and friendships ==
Barton became friends with Southey, Lamb, and other men and women of letters, including the local children's writer Anne Knight, with whom he lodged, while providing poems for some of her books. His chief works are The Convict's Appeal published in 1818, a protest against the death penalty and the severity of the criminal code, and Household Verses published 1845, which came to the notice of Sir R. Peel, through whom he obtained a pension of £100 a year. Other volumes of his were entitled Napoleon and Other Poems (1822), Poetic Vigils (1824) and A New Year's Eve and Other Poems.

Richard Ryan dedicated to Barton his Poems on Sacred Subjects to which are added several miscellaneous (1824).

Apart from some hymns, his works are almost forgotten, but he was described as an amiable and estimable man – simple and sympathetic. His best-known hymns are "Lamp of our feet, whereby we trace", "Walk in the light, so shalt thou know", "Fear not, Zion's sons and daughters", "Hath the invitation ended?" "See we not beyond the portal?" and "Those who live in love shall know".

Lucy published a selection of her father's poems and letters, to which Edward Fitzgerald, translator of the Rubáiyát of Omar Khayyám and her future husband, wrote a biographical introduction.
