= John Barton (missionary) =

English Anglican missionary

John Barton (1836–1908) was an English Anglican missionary in India. He served as the founding principal of the Cathedral Mission College in Kolkota in 1865.

== Early life ==
Born at Eastleigh, Hampshire, on 31 December 1836, he was the sixth child of John Barton (1798–1852) by his wife Fanny, daughter of James Rickman. His background was of Cumberland Quakers, and Bernard Barton was his uncle. His mother died in 1841, and her sister Josephina brought up the family.

After schooling at Bishop Waltham and Highgate, Barton matriculated at Christ's College, Cambridge, Michaelmas 1855. He founded the Cambridge University Church Missionary Union, and graduated B.A. in January 1859, M.A. in 1863. He was ordained in September 1860 and sailed in October for Calcutta.

== Missionary in India ==
After receiving priest's orders, Barton went to Agra. There he helped in superintending St John's College, Agra with an attendance of 260 students, and the orphanage at Secundra, five miles away, with 300 children. He was transferred to Amritsar in May 1863, and was appointed in 1865 principal of a new Cathedral Mission College at Calcutta. From 1871 to 1875 he was secretary of the Madras mission, twice visiting the missions in South India.

== Later life ==
During 1870–1, and again during 1876–7, Barton did administrative work at the Church Missionary House in London. From 1877 to 1893 he was vicar of Holy Trinity Church, Cambridge, but was absent in Ceylon for four months in 1884, and during 1889, after refusing offers of the bishoprics of both Travancore and Tinnevelly, was in charge of the latter district. In 1893 he refused the call to a bishopric in Japan, and left Cambridge for London to become chief secretary of the Church Pastoral Aid Society, whose "forward movement" he organised. He died at Weybridge on 26 November 1908, and was buried there; a tablet and memorial window were placed in Holy Trinity Church, Cambridge. Barton was a keen botanist, geologist, and mountaineer.

== Works ==
Barton published Remarks on the Orthography of Indian Geographical Names, reprinted from Friend of India (1871); Missionary Conference Report (1873), and Memorial Sketch of Major-General Edward Lake, Commissioner of Jalundhur (2nd edit. 1878). A map of India, made largely by him while in Calcutta, was published in 1873.

== Family ==
Barton married twice:

1. in May 1859, Catherine Wigram (d. 1860); and
2. in October 1863, Emily Eugenia, daughter of Charles Boileau Elliott.

His second wife, six sons, and two daughters survived him. A son, Cecil Edward Barton (d. 1909), missionary in the Punjab, was rector of Rousdon, Devon, and joint author of A Handy Atlas of Church and Empire (1908).

== Notes ==
Attribution

This article incorporates text from a publication now in the public domain: Lee, Sidney, ed. (1912). "Barton, John". Dictionary of National Biography (2nd supplement). Vol. 1. London: Smith, Elder & Co.
