= Thomas Barton (Royalist) =

Thomas Barton, D.D. (died 1681–2), was a royalist divine.

== Life ==
Barton received his education at Magdalen Hall, Oxford, and took both degrees in arts in that university before 20 November 1629, when he was presented by Charles I to the rectory of Eynesbury, Huntingdonshire, then void by simony. He subsequently, and apparently in 1631, became rector of Westmeston, Sussex, of which benefice he was, for his loyalty to the King, deprived in 1642 by the Parliamentarians. During the civil war he was chaplain to Prince Rupert, and on 25 August 1660 he was restored to his rectory of Westmeston. On 21 March 1663 he was created D.D. at Oxford by virtue of a letter from the Earl of Clarendon, chancellor of the university. He was buried at Westmeston 25 March 1682–3.

== Works ==
- 'Ἀντιτείχισμα, or a Counter-scarfe prepared Anno 1642 for the eviction of those Zealots that in their Works defy all external bowing at the Name of Jesus. Or the Exaltation of his Person and Name, by God and us, in Ten Tracts, against Jewes, Turkes, Pagans, Heretickes, Schismatickes, &c., that oppose both, or either,’ London, 1643, 4to.
- 'Ἀπόδεισις τοῦ Ἀντιτείχισματος. Or a Tryall of the Covnter-scarfe, Made 1642. In answer to a Scandalous Pamphlet intituled A Treatise against superstitious Jesu-worship written by Mascall Giles, Vicar of Ditcheling, in Sussex. Wherein are discovered his Sophismes; and the Holy Mother, our Church, is cleered of all the slanders which hee hath laid on her,’ London, 1643, 4to.
- 'Λόγος ἀγώνιος, or a Sermon of the Christian Race, preached before his Maiesty at Christ Church in Oxford, 9 May 1643' [Oxford], 1643, 8vo.
- 'King David's Church-Prayer; set forth in a Sermon preached at S. Margaret Pattens, alias Rood-Church, London,’ on 24 June 1649. Printed in 4to in that year.
