= Jakub Bartoň =

Czech ice hockey player

- Born: July 13, 1981 (age 44) Jihlava, Czechoslovakia
- Height: 5 ft 10 in (178 cm)
- Weight: 185 lb (84 kg; 13 st 3 lb)
- Position: Defence
- Shot: Right
- Played for: HC Pardubice; HC Oceláři Třinec; HC Znojemští Orli; HC Vítkovice; HC Olomouc
- Playing career: 2002–2016

Jakub Bartoň (born July 13, 1981) is a Czech former professional ice hockey defenceman. He played with HC Vítkovice in the Czech Extraliga during the 2010–11 Czech Extraliga season.

== Career statistics ==
			Regular season					Playoffs
Season	Team	League	GP	G	A	Pts	PIM	GP	G	A	Pts	PIM
1999–00	HC Pardubice U20	Czech U20	47	7	5	12	30	6	0	0	0	4
2000–01	HC Pardubice U20	Czech U20	35	2	15	17	40	—	—	—	—	—
2001–02	HC Pardubice U20	Czech U20	38	2	25	27	44	6	2	3	5	14
2001–02	HC Pardubice	Czech	2	0	0	0	0	—	—	—	—	—
2001–02	HC Šumperští Draci	Czech2	9	0	1	1	2	—	—	—	—	—
2002–03	HC Pardubice U20	Czech U20	1	0	2	2	0	—	—	—	—	—
2002–03	HC Pardubice	Czech	4	0	0	0	0	—	—	—	—	—
2002–03	HC Hradec Králové	Czech2	18	1	3	4	22	—	—	—	—	—
2002–03	IHC Písek	Czech2	17	1	3	4	12	5	0	0	0	4
2003–04	HC Oceláři Třinec	Czech	2	0	0	0	2	—	—	—	—	—
2003–04	HC Havířov Panthers	Czech2	9	0	0	0	8	—	—	—	—	—
2003–04	IHC Písek	Czech2	6	0	0	0	6	—	—	—	—	—
2004–05	HC Oceláři Třinec	Czech	3	0	0	0	4	—	—	—	—	—
2004–05	HC Slezan Opava	Czech2	28	0	2	2	63	—	—	—	—	—
2004–05	HC Olomouc	Czech2	18	1	3	4	14	—	—	—	—	—
2005–06	HC Olomouc	Czech2	50	0	7	7	38	4	0	0	0	10
2006–07	HC Olomouc	Czech2	47	1	5	6	107	—	—	—	—	—
2007–08	HC Olomouc	Czech2	36	2	8	10	64	11	1	2	3	22
2007–08	Orli Znojmo	Czech	1	0	0	0	0	—	—	—	—	—
2008–09	HC Olomouc	Czech2	46	1	8	9	46	8	0	0	0	8
2009–10	HC Olomouc	Czech2	43	4	10	14	63	10	1	0	1	8
2010–11	HC Olomouc	Czech2	41	3	9	12	28	6	0	0	0	2
2010–11	HC Vítkovice	Czech	4	0	0	0	4	16	1	0	1	4
2011–12	HC Olomouc	Czech2	52	12	19	31	40	13	0	6	6	52
2012–13	HC Olomouc	Czech2	43	8	24	32	59	10	1	5	6	12
2013–14	HC Olomouc	Czech2	41	4	8	12	34	11	2	3	5	4
2014–15	HC Olomouc	Czech	3	0	0	0	0	—	—	—	—	—
2014–15	SK Horácká Slavia Třebíč	Czech2	51	9	20	29	38	6	0	1	1	4
2015–16	SK Horácká Slavia Třebíč	Czech2	32	1	7	8	24	—	—	—	—	—
2016–17	Basingstoke Bison	EPIHL	5	0	0	0	4	—	—	—	—	—
2016–17	Corsaires de Dunkerque	France2	15	1	5	6	2	—	—	—	—	—
Czech totals			27	0	1	1	14	16	1	0	1	4
Czech2 totals			587	48	137	185	668	84	5	17	22	126
