= Martha Helen Barton =

American mathematician (1891–1971)

- Born: August 9, 1891; Baltimore, Maryland
- Died: March 19, 1971 (aged 79); Greensboro, North Carolina
- Other name: Helen Barton
- Education: Goucher College, Johns Hopkins University
- Occupations: Mathematician, physicist
- Known for: Earned a doctorate in mathematics before 1940

Martha Helen Barton (1891–1971), also known as Helen Barton, was an American physicist and mathematician. She was one of the few women to earn a doctorate in the United States in mathematics before World War II.

== Biography ==
Martha Helen Barton was born August 9, 1891, in Baltimore, Maryland, the daughter of Mary Irene Eichelberger and James Sheridan Barton. She attended Western High School graduating with honors and then completed her bachelor's degree from nearby Goucher College in 1913, a member of Phi Beta Kappa. By then she was known as Helen Barton. She worked for one year as an assistant in physics at Goucher and the following year, 1914–1915, began graduate studies in mathematics and physics as a Goucher alumnae fellow at the Johns Hopkins University in Baltimore.

=== Educator ===
For four years beginning in 1915, Barton headed the department of chemistry and physics at Salem College, a private college for women in Winston-Salem, North Carolina. She spent the next two years as a math instructor at Wellesley College in Massachusetts. Returning to her graduate study at Johns Hopkins during the summers of 1920 and 1921, she also pursued graduate work at Harvard University in the winter of 1921 even as she taught at Wellesley. Johns Hopkins awarded her a master's degree in June 1922. Her master's thesis was titled: The fundamental theorem of algebra.

In 1921, she relocated to teach at a private institution in Michigan, Albion College, where Barton was named associate professor of mathematics. Johns Hopkins awarded her a doctorate in 1926 for mathematics with physics as her first subordinate subject and applied mathematics as the second. Her research was titled: A Modern Presentation of Grassmann's Tensor Analysis. Barton's work inspired her supervisor Frank Morley and Francis D. Murnaghan to note that, "she has considerably simplified the exposition of Grassmann's theory of extensive magnitudes by the use of [the generalized Kronecker symbol]."

=== Professor ===
Barton taught for a year as a professor and department head at Alabama College, a rural college for women in Montevallo, Alabama, (today’s University of Montevallo). In 1927, she joined the faculty of the North Carolina College for Women (later known as the Woman's College of the University of North Carolina and now called the University of North Carolina at Greensboro), and she taught as an associate professor and was then named the acting head of the department. In 1928, she was named professor and department head. Although she retired at 68 in 1960 as professor emeritus, she continued her role there part-time as an educator.

Helen Barton died March 19, 1971, after a long illness in Greensboro at age 79. She was buried in Baltimore.

== Memberships ==
According to Green, Barton was active in several professional organizations.

- American Mathematical Society
- American Association of University Professors
- Mathematical Association of America
- Phi Beta Kappa
- American Association of University Women
- Sigma Xi

== Legacy ==
- The Helen Barton Mathematics and Statistics scholarship at the University of North Carolina at Greensboro is awarded to both undergraduate and graduate students.
- The Helen Barton Lecture Series in Mathematical Sciences has been held at UNC-Greensboro.
- In 1960 the Barton faculty area in the McIver classroom building at UNC-Greensboro was named in her honor.
