= Harold Barton (cricketer) =

English cricketer (1882–1970)

Personal information
- Full name: Harold George Mitford Barton
- Born: 10 October 1882; Mudeford, Hampshire, England
- Died: 3 July 1970 (aged 87); Southampton, Hampshire, England
- Batting: Right-handed

Domestic team information
- Years: Team
- 1907: Buckinghamshire
- 1910–1912: Hampshire

Career statistics
| Competition | First-class |
|---|---|
| Matches | 8 |
| Runs scored | 146 |
| Batting average | 11.23 |
| 100s/50s | –/– |
| Top score | 31 |
| Catches/stumpings | 2/– |
- Source: Cricinfo, 15 January 2010

Harold George Mitford Barton (10 November 1882 – 3 July 1970) was an English first-class cricketer.

The son of The Reverend H. C. M. Barton, he was born at Mudeford in November 1882. Though he did not make it into the Sherborne cricket eleven, he did play minor counties cricket for Buckinghamshire in the 1907 Minor Counties Championship, making three appearances. Barton later played first-class cricket for Hampshire, debuting against Northamptonshire at Portsmouth in the 1910 County Championship. He played first-class cricket for Hampshire until 1912, making eight appearances. In these, he scored 146 runs at an average of 11.23, with a highest score of 31. Prior to the First World War, he also played field hockey for and was vice-captain of Basingstoke Hockey Club.

A civil engineer by profession, Barton served in the First World War with the Royal Engineers, being commissioned as a temporary second lieutenant in June 1915. He was made a temporary lieutenant and captain in February 1916. He saw action during the war on the Western and Macedonian front's. Five years after the end of the war, Barton relinquished his commission, retaining the rank of captain. He died at Southampton in July 1970; he had married Phyllis Simmons in October 1907.
