= Joe Barton (New Hampshire politician) =

American politician

Member of New Hampshire House of Representatives for Grafton 1
- Incumbent
- Assumed office December 4, 2024

Personal details
- Born: Joseph James Barton; 1975 or 1976 (age 49–50)
- Party: Republican
- Education: Massachusetts Maritime Academy
- Website: Campaign website

Joseph James Barton (born 1975 or 1976) is an American politician and engineer from New Hampshire. He is a member of the New Hampshire House of Representatives and has represented the Grafton 1st district since 2024. He is a member of the Republican party and was formerly the board chairman of Project Veritas.

== Education ==
Barton attended the Massachusetts Maritime Academy and was a member of its class of 2002.

== Career ==
Barton worked as an engineer at a nuclear power plant before he worked for the U.S. Navy on nuclear submarines at Portsmouth Naval Shipyard.

Jack Kimball, the former New Hampshire Republican party chairman, referred to Barton as "my black ops" guy in 2011.

Barton was the chairman of the Newmarket Republican Committee and in 2017 he was suspended by the New Hampshire Republican party for advocating against Kelly Ayotte as a candidate for the United States Senate.

A settlement was reached after Barton filed a lawsuit against the International Federation of Professional and Technical Engineers Local 4.

As the board chairman of Project Veritas, Barton acknowledged in an August 18, 2023, meeting that an audit of the organization may force it to be shut down or could prompt an investigation by the Internal Revenue Service.

In 2025, Barton sponsored a resolution asking the United States Congress to move the border of New Hampshire northward to make Badger's Island, the Portsmouth Naval Shipyard in Kittery, Maine, the Piscataqua River, Portsmouth Harbor, and Seavey's Island part of New Hampshire.

In March 2025, Barton was removed from the House Legislative Administration Committee after he voted with Democrats on a motion to allow an amendment to a bill to create a study committee to examine ways to improve the usefulness of fiscal notes to be considered.

Barton is the prime sponsor of a bill that would permit one-party consent recordings of conversations and telephone calls, which would make New Hampshire's telephone call recording laws the same as Maine and the majority of the other states in the United States. He was reported to say that secret audio or video recording of politicians would be beneficial to the public and what the bill he proposed "is really about is bringing accountability and transparency through the use of recording measures".

== Personal life ==
Barton holds a private pilot certificate, is a private pilot, and claims to speak several languages, including French. He can play the piano and the bagpipe. He has participated in the New Hampshire Highland Games.

=== Legal issues ===
Barton was convicted of resisting arrest for an incident that occurred on November 4, 2014, when he was a vote challenger at a polling place. He was also charged with disorderly conduct and simple assault. Vote challengers in New Hampshire are required to make any complaints about a voter's eligibility in writing, but Barton was accused of making verbal complaints concerning the eligibility of voters.

In 2015, Barton was arrested and charged for falsifying a letter from the New Hampshire Republican party chairwoman that authorized him to be a vote challenger at a polling place.

The New Hampshire Executive Council pardoned Barton in 2018 after a 3–2 vote along party lines for his conviction of resisting arrest.

Barton was reported to have sued the White Mountains Regional School District, the town of Whitefield, New Hampshire, the Whitefield Police Department, and Marion Anastasia, the superintendent of Whitefield Elementary School, over a no-trespass order from October 2025 that restricts him from exiting his automobile while on school property.
