= Charles Barton (legal writer) =

English legal writer

Charles Barton (1768–1843) was an English legal writer. He was called to the bar at the Inner Temple in 1795, and practised as a conveyancer. He died at Cheltenham on 18 November 1843, aged 75.

== Works ==
His principal publications are:

- 'Historical Treatise of a Suit in Equity,' 1796.
- 'Elements of Conveyancing,' 6 vols., 1802–5, 2nd ed. 1821–2.
- 'Original Precedents in Conveyancing.' 5 vols., 1807–10.
- 'Practical Dissertations on Conveyancing,' 1828.
