= Lela Viola Barton =

Botanist (1901–1967)

Lela Viola Barton (1901–1967) was an American botanist who specialized in seed germination and storage.

== Early life ==
Lela Barton was born in Farmington, Washington County, Arkansas, on 14 November 1901, the third of five children born to Gaston Reuben and Mary Fannie (née Miller) Barton.

== Career ==
Barton worked at the Boyce Thompson Institute for Plant Research at Yonkers, in New York City, specializing in seeds.

== Death ==
Barton died from a cerebral haemorrhage aged 65 at Tucson, Arizona, on 31 July 1967; she was buried at Fairview Memorial Gardens, Fayetteville, Arkansas. She never married.

== Publications ==
- - (1933). Seedling production of tree peony. Contrib. Boyce Thomp. Inst. 5. 451–460.
- - (1939). Storage of elm seed. Contrib. Boyce Thomp. Inst. 10, 221–233.
- - (1936). Germination and seed production in Lilium sp. Contrib. Boyce Thomp. Inst. 8. 297–309.
- - (1939). Experiments at Boyce Thompson Institute on germination and dormancy in seeds. Sci. Hort. 7. 186–193.
- - & Schroeder, E. M. (1941). Convellaria majalis L. and Silacina racemosa (L.) Desf. Contrib. Boyce Thomp. Inst. 12. 277–300.
- - (1943). The storage of citrus seed. Contrib. Boyce Thomp. Inst. 13, 47–55.
- - (1944). Some seeds showing special dormancy. Contrib. Boyce Thomp. Inst. 13. 259–271.
- - & Thornton, N. C. (1947). Germination and sex population studies of Ilex opaca Ait. Contrib. Boyce Thomp. Inst. 14. 405–410.
- - & Chandler, C. (1957). Physiological and morphological effects of gibberellic acid on epicotyl dormancy of tree peony. Contrib. Boyce Thomp. Inst. 19. 201–214.
- - (1960). Storage of seeds of Lobelia cardinalis. Contrib. Boyce Thomp. Inst. 395–401.
- - (1961). Seed preservation and viability. Leonard Hill, London.
- - (1965). Viability of seeds of Theobrama cacao L. Contrib. Boyce Thomp. Inst. 23. 109–122.
- - (1966a). Effects of temperature and moisture on viability of stored lettuce, onion, and tomato seed. Contrib. Boyce Thomp. Inst. 23. 285–290.
- - (1966b). Viability of Pyrethrum seeds. Contrib. Boyce Thomp. Inst. 23, 267–268.
- - (1967). Bibliography of Seeds. 858 p., Columbia University Press, New York.
- - & Croker, W. (1990). Physiology of Seeds: An Introduction to the Experimental Study of Seed and Germination Problems. Bishen Singh Mahendrapal Singh, Dehradun
- - (2005). Seeds: Their Preservation And Longevity. Asiatic Publishing House, ISBN 9788187067696
