= Roger Barton (rugby union) =

Australia international rugby union player (1875–1957)

- Born: Roger Fernival Darvall Barton; 30 July 1875 Bathurst, NSW
- Died: 17 June 1957 (aged 81)

Rugby union career
- Position: flanker
International career
Years	Team	Apps	(Points)
1899	Australia	1	(0)

Roger Fernival Darvall Barton (30 July 1875 – 17 June 1957) was a rugby union player who represented Australia.

Barton, a flanker, was born in Bathurst, NSW and claimed international rugby cap for Australia. His debut game was against Great Britain, at Sydney, on 5 August 1899.
