= John Barton (Quaker) =

English Quaker abolitionist (1755–1789)

John Barton (1755–1789) was one of nine English Quaker members of the Society for the Abolition of the Slave Trade, which was set up in 1787 by William Wilberforce and two other Anglicans. The committee's efforts ultimately led to the passage of the Abolition of the Slave Trade Act, 1807 by the UK Parliament on 25 March in that year.

== Family ==
Barton was married to Mary Done (1752–1784), with whom he had a son, the poet Bernard Barton, and a daughter, the education writer Maria Hack. Both of them were born in Carlisle. After their mother's death, Barton moved south and married Elizabeth Horne (1760–1833) of Tottenham, Middlesex, by whom he had a son, John Barton, an economist who specialized in the study of poverty and was mentioned by Karl Marx in his selected writings
