= Anne Barton (Shakespearean scholar) =

English Shakespearean scholar

- Anne Barton in the 1960s.
- Born: Barbara Ann Roesen; 9 May 1933; Scarsdale, New York, United States
- Died: 11 November 2013 (aged 80); Cambridge, England, United Kingdom
- Other name: Anne Righter
- Education: Bryn Mawr College; Girton College, Cambridge
- Occupation: Shakespearean critic
- Years active: 1953–2005
- Spouses: William Righter (1957–60; divorced); John Barton (1969–2013; her death)

Barbara Ann Barton (previously Righter, née Roesen; 9 May 1933 − 11 November 2013), known as Anne Barton, was a renowned American-English scholar and Shakespearean critic.

== Life ==
Born in Scarsdale, New York, the only child of Oscar and Blanche (née Williams) Roesen, Barton attended Bryn Mawr College, studying Renaissance literature with A. C. Sprague. In 1953, her senior essay on Love's Labor's Lost was published in the Shakespeare Quarterly, (the first undergraduate submission accepted by the journal). She then attended Girton College, Cambridge, completing her doctoral thesis in 1960 under M. C. Bradbrook. Barton's doctoral work was published in 1962 as Shakespeare and the Idea of the Play. Married in 1957 to William Righter, she returned to the U.S. and taught briefly at Ithaca College. Divorced in 1960, Barton returned to the U.K. and became Lady Carlisle Research Fellow at Girton; she took up a teaching fellowship there in 1962 and was appointed Director of Studies in English in 1963 (while also holding a University Lectureship in the Faculty of English). In 1969, she married theatre director John Barton, the co-founder with Sir Peter Hall of the Royal Shakespeare Company. Barton held a series of major academic appointments: From 1972 to 1974, she was Hildred Carlile Professor in English at Bedford College, London. The first female Fellow at New College, Oxford (1974-1984), she returned to Cambridge in 1984 as Grace 2 Professor of English, becoming a Fellow of Trinity College in 1986.

Anne Barton died on 11 November 2013, aged 80, in Cambridge, England, United Kingdom. She was survived by her husband of nearly 45 years, theatre director John Barton.

== Selected bibliography ==
- Roesen, Bobbyann. “Love’s Labour’s Lost.” Shakespeare Quarterly 4 (1953): 411–26.
- Righter, Anne. Shakespeare and the Idea of the Play. Chatto and Windus, 1962.
- Barton, Anne. Introduction to The Tempest. Harmondsworth: Penguin, 1968.
- ———. “Shakespeare and the Limits of Language.” Shakespeare Survey 24, no. 1971 (1971): 19–30.
- ———. “Shakespeare: His Tragedies.” English Drama To 1710 (1971): 197–233.
- ———. “As You Like It and Twelfth Night: Shakespeare’s Sense of an Ending.” Shakespearean Comedy, 1972, 160–80.
- ———, "The Shakespearean Forest" - Cambridge etc. Cambridge University Press, 2017, 184pp
- Barton, Anne, and G. Blakemore Evans. The Riverside Shakespeare. Houghton Mifflin Boston, 1972.
- ———. “The King Disguised: Shakespeare’s Henry V and the Comical History.” The Triple Bond: Plays, Mainly Shakespearean, in Performance, 1975, 92–117.
- ———. “‘A Light to Lesson Ages’: Byron's Political Plays.” In Byron, 138–162. Springer, 1975.
- ———. Shakespeare and the Idea of the Play. Praeger Pub Text, 1977.
- ———. “London Comedy and the Ethos of the City.” The London Journal 4, no. 2 (1978): 158–180.
- ———. “The New Inn and the Problem of Jonson’s Late Style.” English Literary Renaissance 9, no. 3 (1979): 395–418.
- ———. Introduction to Hamlet, Ed. Tjb Spencer, New Penguin Shakespeare. London: Penguin, 1980.
- ———. “Harking Back to Elizabeth: Ben Jonson and Caroline Nostalgia.” ELH 48, no. 4 (1981): 706–731.
- ———. “Julius Caesar and Coriolanus: Shakespeare’s Roman World of Words.” Shakespeare’s Craft: Eight Lectures, 1982, 24–47.
- ———. “Shakespeare and Jonson.” Shakespeare, Man of the Theater, 1983, 160.
- ———. Ben Jonson: Dramatist. Cambridge University Press, 1984.
- ———. “Falstaff and the Comic Community.” Shakespeare’s “Rough Magic”: Renaissance Essays in Honor of CL Barber, 1985, 131–148.
- ———. “Livy, Machiavelli, and Shakespeare’s Coriolanus.” Shakespeare Survey, no. 38 (1985): 115–129.
- ———. “‘Enter Mariners Wet’: Realism in Shakespeare's Last Plays.” Essays, Mainly Shakespearean, 1986, 182–203.
- ———. “Shakespeare’s Sense of an Ending in Twelfth Night.’.” Twelfth Night: Critical Essays, 1986, 303–10.
- ———. The Synthesizing Impulse of A Midsummer Night’s Dream. William Shakespeare’s a Midsummer Night’s Dream. Harold Bloom-Editor. Chelsea House, New York, 1987.
- ———. “The King Disguised: The Two Bodies of Henry V.” Modern Critical Interpretations: William Shakespeare’s Henry V, New York: Chelsea House, 1988.
- ———. “Don Juan Transformed.” In Byron: Augustan and Romantic, 199–220. Springer, 1990.
- ———. The Names of Comedy. University of Toronto Press, 1990.
- ———. Shakespeare in the Sun, 1993.
- ———. Byron and Shakespeare. 2004.
