= John Barton (writer) =

John Barton (15th century) was an English writer on Lollardy.

Barton appears to have flourished in the reign of Henry V, to whom he dedicated his 'Confutatio Lollardorum.' A manuscript copy of this work is preserved in the library of All Souls' College, Oxford, written in a hand which Henry Octavius Coxe assigned to the 15th century. Other manuscripts of this author are mentioned by Thomas Tanner, who wanted to identify him with a certain John Barton, Esq., buried in St. Martin's Church, Ludgate, 1439. Tanner says that he was possibly chancellor of Oxford; but he fails to give any authority. Barton's own description of himself, as quoted by John Bale was 'plain John Barton, the physician.'
