= Andrew Barton (journalist) =

American journalist

- Occupations: Professor of Communication, University of Miami

Andrew Barton is a lecturer in the School of Communication at the University of Miami in Coral Gables, Florida. He teaches Advanced Broadcast Journalism and serves as faculty advisor to the student-produced newscast, “NewsVision.”

== Biography ==
Barton grew up in Europe, attending school in Italy, France and Spain. He graduated with a Bachelor of Arts from McGill University of Montreal, and received an M.A. in Journalism from Ohio State University.

For the first eight years of his professional career, Barton worked as a television news photographer, reporter, and anchor in Shreveport, Louisiana, Orlando, Florida, and Dallas, Texas. During this period he covered the early Space Shuttle developments at the Kennedy Space Center and traveled with presidential candidates Ronald Reagan and George H. W. Bush during the 1980 campaign.

Next, Barton moved into television news management. For three years, he served as assistant news director at WPLG-TV in Miami, Florida, followed by twelve years as a television news director in Norfolk, Virginia, Greensboro, North Carolina, Louisville, Kentucky, New Orleans, Louisiana, and Harrisburg, Pennsylvania.

After this, he spent three years teaching broadcast journalism at Ohio State, while simultaneously hosting and producing a public affairs interview show at the PBS television station.

Barton joined the University of Miami faculty in 2001.

== Sources ==
- Barton's University of Miami Home Page
