= Joseph Barton (cricketer) =

English cricketer

Personal information
- Full name: Joseph Barton
- Born: 10 January 1860; Smethwick, Staffordshire, England
- Died: 31 January 1945 (aged 85); Selly Oak, Warwickshire, England
- Batting: Right-handed
- Bowling: Right-arm fast

Domestic team information
- Years: Team
- 1902: Staffordshire
- 1895–1896: Warwickshire

Career statistics
| Competition | First-class |
|---|---|
| Matches | 3 |
| Runs scored | 38 |
| Batting average | 9.50 |
| 100s/50s | –/– |
| Top score | 16 |
| Balls bowled | 345 |
| Wickets | 7 |
| Bowling average | 23.57 |
| 5 wickets in innings | 1 |
| 10 wickets in match | – |
| Best bowling | 5/73 |
| Catches/stumpings | –/– |
- Source: Cricinfo, 2 January 2012

Joseph Barton (10 January 1860 – 31 January 1945) was an English cricketer. Barton was a right-handed batsman who bowled right-arm fast. He was born at Smethwick, Staffordshire.

Barton made his first-class debut for Warwickshire against Essex in the 1895 County Championship. He made a further first-class appearance in 1895 against Derbyshire, with him making a final first-class appearance in the 1896 County Championship against Surrey. All three matches were played at Edgbaston. Barton took 7 wickets in his three first-class matches, which came at an average of 23.57. His best performance came on debut against Essex when he claimed a five wicket haul with figures of 5/73. With the bat, he scored 38 runs at a batting average of 9.50, with a high score of 16.

He later played for Staffordshire in the 1902 Minor Counties Championship, making his debut against Durham. He made five further appearances for the county in that season. He died at Selly Oak, Warwickshire on 31 January 1945.
