= John Barton (director) =

British theatre director (1928–2018)

John Barton CBE
- John Barton in 1965.
- Born: 26 November 1928; London, England
- Died: 18 January 2018 (aged 89)
- Occupations: Director, writer
- Spouse(s): Barbara Anne Roesen (1969–2013; her death)

John Bernard Adie Barton, CBE (26 November 1928 – 18 January 2018), was a British theatre director and teacher whose close association with the Royal Shakespeare Company spanned more than half a century.

== Early life ==
John Barton was the son of Sir Harold Montague and Lady Barton (née Joyce Wale). He was educated at Eton College and King's College, Cambridge and while at Cambridge directed and acted in many productions for the Marlowe Society and the ADC. At the Westminster Theatre in July 1953 he directed his first London production, Henry V for the Elizabethan Theatre Company. He created a 12-part series for BBC Radio on the medieval Mysteries, inspired by the York Mystery Plays.

== Royal Shakespeare Company ==
John Barton joined the Royal Shakespeare Company (RSC) in 1960 at the invitation of its founder, Peter Hall. In addition to directing plays, his particular responsibility was to improve the quality of verse speaking in the company. He and Peter Hall developed a house style that was rooted in rigorous analysis of the text while observing the shape and rhythm of the blank verse line. Having everyone "speaking Shakespeare the same way" was core to the new ensemble and Barton’s role in teaching and training the actors in that technique made a vital contribution. In 1963, he collaborated with Peter Hall on the groundbreaking The Wars of the Roses which defined the principles and direction of the new company. He directed over 50 productions, some in collaboration with Hall and Trevor Nunn. His landmark productions at the RSC include 1969's Twelfth Night with Judi Dench as Viola. In the RSC's 50th anniversary commemorations (2011) Barton's teaching was acknowledged as one of the lasting reasons for the company's success and he is regarded as one of the most influential directors of Shakespeare of his time.

At the Aldwych Theatre in London in 1980, Barton directed The Greeks, his adaptations (with playwright Kenneth Cavander) from Homer, Euripides, Aeschylus and Sophocles, ten plays centring on the Oresteia legend, presented in the terse style of the original verse. This was part of an RSC London season which also embraced Trevor Nunn and John Caird's production of David Edgar's eight-hour adaptation of Nicholas Nickleby. "Both projects were daunting undertakings, planned at a time of renewed financial crisis, and both proved remarkably successful."

In 1982, while working with 21 RSC members, including Judi Dench, Ian McKellen, Patrick Stewart, Michael Pennington, David Suchet, Sinéad Cusack, Ben Kingsley, Roger Rees, Jane Lapotaire, Donald Sinden and Peggy Ashcroft, Barton recorded nine workshop sessions for London Weekend Television. These programmes, together entitled Playing Shakespeare, were aired that year on Channel 4 and became the source material for Barton's best-selling book of the same name. Though stiff in his resolve against writing on the subject of performing Shakespeare, the surprising success of the televised series convinced Barton to produce a book. It, too, found great success, and remains a popular guide to performing Shakespeare among working actors and aspirants. Playing Shakespeare, the ITV series, is available on DVD. He followed this series up with a single DVD entitled The Shakespeare Sessions which was released in 2003, in which he and director Peter Hall worked with actors Cynthia Nixon, Dustin Hoffman, Kevin Kline, and Liev Schreiber.

Barton is quoted in an article by Michael Billington as saying "the success or failure of the RSC depends on the quality of the actors. If I've learned anything in my time, it is that if you get the right combination of actors, a production will generally work... But one should always remember that no theatre company is immortal and Zeus could still chuck a thunderbolt at any moment".

Barton possessed an encyclopaedic knowledge of Shakespeare and was known to be able to identify one of his plays from a single line of text. A story is told of Barton getting so into his directorial work giving notes one night, that he fell into the orchestra pit, climbed out, and dusted himself off before resuming. A great deal of the past and continuing success of the RSC is attributed to John Barton and to his unrivalled wisdom of language, verse, character, and voice.

Barton continued these workshops and conducted Master Classes at BADA (British American Drama Academy) during their Summer in Oxford training programmes. He was awarded the 2001 Sam Wanamaker Prize. Barton believed that the present-day speech of the Appalachian Mountains is the most suitable model for actors who want to imitate the accent used at the time of Shakespeare's plays.

In 1969, he married the former Anne Righter, a distinguished Shakespeare scholar at Girton College, Cambridge (later Fellow at Trinity College, Cambridge). Anne Barton died in November 2013.

== Notable stage productions ==
- 1963 - The Hollow Crown
- 1963 - The War of the Roses
- 1968 - Troilus and Cressida
- 1969 - Twelfth Night
- 1971 - Othello
- 1973 - Richard II
- 1976 - Much Ado About Nothing
- 1977 - The Pillars of the Community
- 1978 - Love's Labour's Lost
- 1978 - Merchant of Venice
- 1978 - The Way of the World
- 1980 - The Greeks
- 1981 - Merchant of Venice
- 1986 - The Rover
- 1988 - Three Sisters
- 1995 - Cain
- 1995 - Life's a Dream
- 1995 - Waste
- 2000 - Tantalus

== Filmography ==
As cast member/instructor:

- 1982 – Playing Shakespeare (TV)

As writer:

- 1965 – The Wars of the Roses (TV)
- 1970 – Hallmark Hall of Fame – Hamlet (adaptation) (TV)
- 1984 – Morte d'Arthur (adaptation) (TV)
- 1991 – The War That Never Ends (TV)

As director:

- 1965 – War of the Roses (TV)
- 1968 – All's Well That Ends Well (TV)

As actor:

- 1984 – Morte d'Arthur – Sir Thomas Malory

== Bibliography ==
- Barton, John; Cavander, Kenneth. Ten Greek Plays Given as a Trilogy. London: Heinemann, 1981. ISBN 978-0-435-23068-5
- Barton, John. Playing Shakespeare. London: Methuen, 1984. ISBN 978-0-7136-8773-6
- Greenwald, Michael L. Directions by Indirections (John Barton of the Royal Shakespeare Company). Cranbury: Associated University Press, 1985
- Pearson, Richard. A Band of Arrogant and United Heroes (Adelphi Press, 1992)
- Barton, John. "The Shakespeare Sessions". The Working Arts Library/Applause, 2007 ISBN 978-1557835369
