= John Barton (engineer) =

Sir John Barton
- Born: 5 August 1771; Plymouth, England
- Died: 25 August 1834 (aged 63); Windsor, England
- Spouse: Ann Harrison

Sir John Barton (5 August 1771 – 25 August 1834) was an English engineer.

== Information ==
He created a micrometer, which he called the "Atometer" that was used for measuring small distances using a differential-screw technique, a ruling engine, and patented a method of creating metal ornaments engraved with parallel lines, using diffraction to create colours. An example of the latter are "Barton's Buttons", which were gold buttons stamped with a hard steel die on which Barton cut hexagonal patterns. Sir John Barton also invented a floating compass.

Sir John Barton served as deputy comptroller of the Royal Mint in the early part of the nineteenth century and later as Treasurer to Queen Adelaide. He died at Windsor on 25 August 1834. After his death, his son William Henry Barton, who also worked at the Royal Mint, gave John Harrison's last pendulum clock to the Royal Astronomical Society.

== Personal life ==
John Barton's wife Ann was the granddaughter of John Harrison, of longitude fame. She died in 1799, and John Harrison's last pendulum clock came into the possession of John Barton. Queen Adelaide was godmother to the Bartons' daughter, who was also named Adelaide and who was to become the great grandmother of the writer of this paragraph. John Barton had gained his knighthood while private secretary to the Prince of Wales for services rendered in keeping the prince's wife out of the way while the prince was consorting with his mistress. Sir John Barton became a frequent and well received visitor to Windsor Castle, and his memorial plaque is now to be seen in St. George's chapel there.
