= John Barton (economist) =

English economist

John Barton (11 June 1789 – 10 March 1852) was an English economist and botanist.

== Life ==
Barton was born in London to Quaker parents, John Barton (1755–1789) and Elizabeth Horne (1760–1833). Throughout his career, his primary concern was poverty. "The poor grow more miserable as the rich grow more wealthy," he wrote in 1846. While he praised the classical school, he disagreed with it on the two pressing policy issues of the day, supporting the continuation of both the Poor Laws and the Corn Laws. He concerned himself mainly with statistical evidence, seldom venturing into the realm of pure theory. His empirical study of the mortality of the poor under the Poor Laws (1824, lost) suggested that contrary to the classical doctrines, the lot of the poor had improved under the operation of this system. "We shall regard the benificent principle of legislative relief, when divested of its incidental vices, as a most useful auxiliary to our endeavors for raising the condition of the labouring classes," he wrote.

His publication Observations on the Circumstances which Influence the Condition of the Labouring Classes of Society is credited with changing the opinion of David Ricardo with regard to the effect of new machinery on wages, unemployment, and national income; the chapter On Machinery, which Ricardo added to the second edition of Principles of Political Economy and Taxation, was the result of Barton's influence.

Barton was one of the founders of Birkbeck College, then called the London Mechanics' Institution. He may have been a member of the London Statistical Society. He was interested in botany in addition to social science.

== Works ==
- Hints for Improving the Condition of the Poor (1815) in The Philanthropist No 18, April 1815
- Observations on the Circumstances which Influence the Condition of the Labouring Classes of Society (1820)
- An Inquiry into causes of the Progressive Depreciation of Agricultural Labour in Modern Times with Suggestions for its Remedy (1830)
- In Defence of the Corn Laws, or An Inquiry into the Expediency of the Existing Restrictions on the Importation of Foreign Corn with Observations on the Present Social and Political Prospects of Great Britain (1833)

== Family ==
Barton married first Ann Woodrouffe Smith in 1811; she died in 1822. His second wife was Fanny, daughter of James Rickman. John Barton the missionary was their son.
