= Little Paxton =

Village in Cambridgeshire, England

Coordinates: 52.25°N 0.25°W

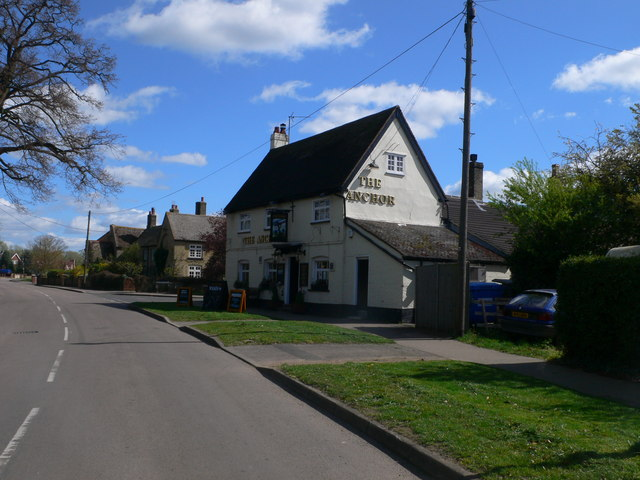
- High Street

- Location within Cambridgeshire
- Population: 3,244 (2011 census. Including Southoe)
- OS grid reference: TL195628
  - London: 51 miles (82 km)
- District: Huntingdonshire
- Shire county: Cambridgeshire
- Region: East
- Country: England
- Sovereign state: United Kingdom
- Post town: ST. NEOTS
- Postcode district: PE19
- Dialling code: 01480
- Police: Cambridgeshire
- Fire: Cambridgeshire
- Ambulance: East of England
- UK Parliament: Huntingdon

Little Paxton in Cambridgeshire, England is a village and civil parish that lies 5 miles (8.0 km) south of Huntingdon and 1.7 miles (2.7 km) north of St Neots. It is in the district and historic county of Huntingdonshire. Until the 1970s it was a minor village and the church was under threat of closure. The building of a housing estate and a junior school revived its fortunes and the establishment of the Paxton Pits Nature Reserve around part of the nearby gravel pits has brought visitors to the village.

The nature reserve features lakes, woodland and part of the Ouse floodplain and is home to large numbers of cormorants and many summer visitors such as nightingales and a large number of passerine birds. Grebes, ducks and geese have colonised the lakes.

The population of the village of Little Paxton is now much larger than that of Great Paxton.

== History ==
Little Paxton is not explicitly mentioned in the Domesday Book of 1086 but is covered by the entry for Great Paxton (or Pachstone as it was then). At that time the settlement of Pacstone had 69 households, which is considered to be a very large settlement for that period, and contained 3 mills and a church (presumably the church at Great Paxton). All of the lands at Little Paxton were held by Countess Judith who was a niece of William the Conqueror. There were a number of fisheries on the river Great Ouse at Little Paxton, the earliest of which can be traced back to 1544. The open fields in the parish were enclosed by an Act of Parliament in 1811–12.

The quarrying of gravel has been an important industry in Little Paxton since the 19th century when gravel from Paxton Park was used in local housing. It was in the 1940s that a much large scale quarrying operation began in the area to the north of Little Paxton village. In 1989, the Paxton Pits Nature Reserve opened on the site of those quarries which by then were no longer used.

== Government ==
As a civil parish, Little Paxton has a parish council. The parish council is elected by the residents of the parish who have registered on the electoral roll; the parish council is the lowest tier of government in England. A parish council is responsible for providing and maintaining a variety of local services including allotments and a cemetery; grass cutting and tree planting within public open spaces such as a village green or playing fields. The parish council reviews all planning applications that might affect the parish and makes recommendations to Huntingdonshire District Council, which is the local planning authority for the parish. The parish council also represents the views of the parish on issues such as local transport, policing and the environment. The parish council raises its own tax to pay for these services, known as the parish precept, which is collected as part of the Council Tax. The parish council consist of fourteen councillors.

Little Paxton was in the historic and administrative county of Huntingdonshire until 1965. From 1965, the village was part of the new administrative county of Huntingdon and Peterborough. Then in 1974, following the Local Government Act 1972, Little Paxton became a part of the county of Cambridgeshire.

The second tier of local government is Huntingdonshire District Council which is a non-metropolitan district of Cambridgeshire and has its headquarters in Huntingdon. Huntingdonshire District Council has 52 councillors representing 29 district wards. Huntingdonshire District Council collects the council tax, and provides services such as building regulations, local planning, environmental health, leisure and tourism. Little Paxton is a district ward and is represented on the district council by one councillor. District councillors serve for four-year terms following elections to Huntingdonshire District Council.

For Little Paxton the third tier of local government is Cambridgeshire County Council which has administration buildings in Cambridge. The county council provides county-wide services such as major road infrastructure, fire and rescue, education, social services, libraries and heritage services. Cambridgeshire County Council consists of 69 councillors representing 60 electoral divisions. Little Paxton is part of the electoral division of Little Paxton and St Neots North and is represented on the county council by two councillors.

At Westminster Little Paxton is in the parliamentary constituency of Huntingdon.

== Geography ==
Little Paxton lies on the western side of the Great Ouse river valley between 14 metres (46 ft) and 32 metres (105 ft) above ordnance datum and the parish covers an area of 1,150 acres (470 hectares). The boundary of the parish to the south and east is the Great Ouse and to the west is the River Kym.

The A1 road follows the route of the Great North Road and lies to the west of Little Paxton; it runs roughly from south-west to north through the parish. There is a restricted access junction at the northern edge of Little Paxton (cannot join A1 southbound) and a restricted access junction that only allows southbound access to the A1 to the south-west of the village. The A1 Road is Northbound traffic to Peterborough and Southbound to London but this only happens from the South-West of Little Paxton

On the eastern side of the parish are a number of disused and working gravel pits. The disused gravel pits are now lakes and the largest of these are Heronry South Lake and Sailing Lake while the smaller lakes are Weedy Lake, Rudd Lake, Cloudy Lake and Hayling Lake.

The village and parish lies on a bedrock of Oxford Clay and in regions there are superficial Glaciofluvial and River Terrace deposits of sand and gravel from the Quaternary period, together with alluvium (clay and silt) from the same period. The land in the north of the parish is characterised as Oadby Member Diamicton, again from the Quaternary period, with rocks formed during Ice Age conditions by glaciers scouring the land. On the western side of the parish, the soil has been classified as a freely draining and slightly acid loamy soil. On the eastern side of the parish, the soil is classified as freely draining and slightly acid but a base-rich loamy soil. The main agricultural land use within the parish of Little Paxton is grassland, but to the north-west of the parish there is a wooded area

== Demography ==
The usual resident population of Little Paxton (including Eynesbury) in the 2011 census was 3,244 of whom 49.6% were male and 50.4% female; the population density was 1,832 persons per square mile (706 per km^{2}). There were 1,361 households; 23.7% of these households consisted of one person, 72.5% contained one family group and there were 3.8% of other household types. The census showed that 15.7% of households had one or more dependent children under the age of 18, and 22.6% of households consisted of people who were all over the age of 65. The mean average number of people per household was 2.4 people.

Of the usual resident population, 19.2% were under the age of 18 years, 61.5% were between 18 and 65 years old, and 19.4% were over the age of 65 years. The mean age was 42.9 years and the median age was 45 years. In 2011, 53.2% of the residents of Little Paxton were involved in part-time, full-time or self-employment. The three major industry areas for residents of Little Paxton were 16.9% in Wholesale and Retail (including repair of motor vehicles), 12.3% in Manufacturing, and 11.5% employed in Human Health and Social Work.

The 2011 census showed that 94.9% of the residents of Little Paxton were born in the United Kingdom, with 1.8% of residents coming from other European Union countries, and 3.3% coming from the rest of the world. At the same time, 97.7% of people in Little Paxton described themselves as white, 0.9% as having mixed or multiple ethnic groups, and 0.8% as being Asian or British Asian, with the remainder in another ethnic group. In that same census, 62.6% described themselves as Christian, 28.5% described themselves as having no religion, 7.7% did not specify a religion, and 1.2% described themselves as having another religion.

=== Historical population ===
The population of Little Paxton from 1801 to 1901 varied between 225 and 310 people.

Village	1911	1921	1931	1951	1961	1971	1991	2001	2011
Little Paxton	214	210	229	291	436	1,629	3,195	3,006	3,244

Census: Little Paxton 1801–1931, 1961 Census: Little Paxton 1951, 1971, 1991 Census: Little Paxton 2001, 2011

== Culture and Community ==
The village has a public house called The Anchor. Gravel extraction remains an important industry in and around the village. There is also a fencing company, a tool hire and a conservatory village. On the edge of the village, a derelict industrial site has been redeveloped to provide modern housing on an island in the middle of the River Great Ouse, between the lock and the weir stream. Little Paxton playing field has two football pitches, a cricket pitch and a floodlit multi-purpose games area. A variety of water sports including waterski, jet ski, and sailing are available on the lakes at Little Paxton. With suitable permits, fishing is allowed in some of the gravel pits and on the river Great Ouse in Little Paxton.

== Transport ==
The Ouse Valley Way is a 150 miles (240 km) long footpath that follows the River Great Ouse from its source near Syresham in Northamptonshire to its mouth in The Wash near King's Lynn and passes through the village. Route 12 of the National Cycle Network is a 121 miles (195 km) route from Enfield Lock to Spalding and passes through the west of the parish.

It is 1.7 miles (2.7 km) from Little Paxton to the railway station at St Neots which is on the East Coast Main Line where regular services run south to London and north to Huntingdon and Peterborough.

Little Paxton also has a Number 66 Bus Service run by Whippet (bus company) which runs South to St Neots and North to Huntingdon and Fenstanton.

== Education ==
Little Paxton Primary School opened in 1972 and has around 360 pupils aged from four to eleven as of December 2022. Senior school pupils attend Longsands Academy or Ernulf Academy in St Neots.

== Landmarks ==
Following the designation of 325 acres (132 hectares) of disused gravel quarries as a Site of Special Scientific Interest by the Nature Conservancy Council, a nature reserve on a part of the site at Little Paxton Pits was opened in 1989. The nature reserve has a number of walking trails and animal observation hides, together with a visitor centre and a small car park. With the acquisition of further land after 2001, the nature reserve was extended to 192 acres (78 hectares). In 2007 Huntingdonshire District Council announced a plan to extend the nature reserve to more than 700 acres (280 hectares) as part of the approval for further extraction of gravel from the Paxton Pits by the Aggregate Industries.

Little Paxton Hall is a Grade II* listed building, close to the church, that was re-built c.1738 but incorporates features that are probably from a 17th-century building on the site. The house has a west facing 18th century facade and was extended to the south in the 19th century.

== Religious sites ==
The Church of England parish church at Little Paxton is dedicated to St James and is a Grade II* listed building that consists of a chancel, nave, south aisle, west tower and a north porch. The church was not mentioned in the Domesday Book, but there is evidence that there was a stone church on the site by the end of the 12th century. The west tower was built c.1400 and the south aisle c.1500. The west tower had just four bells but these had not been rung since 1899 when it was decided that they needed re-hanging. A refurbishment project in 2010–11, which had some National Lottery funding, saw the original bells restored, the acquisition of two-second hand bells, and a new bell cast. The church now has a clock striking bell and a peal of six bells; the new bells were rung for the first time in November 2011. The Church of St James, Little Paxton, is in the deanery of St Neots in the diocese of Ely.
