= 1944 Birthday Honours (BEM) =

The 1944 King's Birthday Honours, celebrating the official birthday of King George VI, were announced on 2 June 1944 for the United Kingdom and British Empire, New Zealand, and South Africa.

They included a large number of people awarded the British Empire Medal (BEM).

The recipients of honours are displayed here as they were styled before their new honour, and arranged by honour, with classes (Knight, Knight Grand Cross, etc.) and then divisions (Military, Civil, etc.) as appropriate.

== Military Division ==
=== Royal Navy ===
- Chief Petty Officer Albert Arrum, C/J.28885.
- Chief Petty Officer David Ashenden, C/239819.
- Chief Petty Officer John Henry William Baker, DSM, D/J.102296 (Higher St. Budeaux, Plymouth).
- Chief Petty Officer Arthur Sidney Braddy, P/J.17972.
- Chief Petty Officer Horace Bryan, D/JX.152152.
- Chief Petty Officer Samuel George Bryant, P/J.27765. (Southsea).
- Chief Petty Officer Boatswain William Edward Donnelly, RTP/R.238507.
- Chief Petty Officer Walter George Durand, P/234315 (Southampton).
- Chief Petty Officer William Earle, DSM, P/231443.
- Chief Petty Officer Horace Joseph Fletcher, P/226599 (Maidenhead).
- Chief Petty Officer Frederick Albert French, DSM, D/J.94677 (Mutley, Plymouth).
- Chief Petty Officer Robert John Green, C/J.7805 (Ilford).
- Chief Petty Officer Francis Joseph Harding, P/J.43808.
- Chief Petty Officer Wilfred Hurditch, D/J.1614 (Plymouth).
- Chief Petty Officer Leonard Jenner, C/J.21933.
- Chief Petty Officer Leonard Pentlow, C/J.97501 (Kettering).
- Chief Petty Officer Reginald Arthur Wilson, P/J.114170 (Portsmouth).
- Acting Chief Petty Officer William Hinton, D/JX.126626.
- Temporary Chief Petty Officer Benjamin Matthew Huntingford, C/J.14882 (Thetford).
- Temporary Chief Petty Officer Leonard Walter Scott, P/JX.148321.
- Chief Petty Officer Airman Leslie Sullivan, FAA/FX.77395 (Chatham).
- Chief Yeoman of Signals Frederick William Henry Chatten, P/JX.129765 (Lowestoft).
- Chief Yeoman of Signals John Cecil Proud, D/J.4495 (Newcastle upon Tyne).
- Chief Yeoman of Signals George Henry Richards P/J.3111 (London, SE.6).
- Chief Yeoman of Signals Richard Charles Turner, P/J.104366 (Hove).
- Chief Engine Room Artificer Edwin Oliver Bedford, P/M.11540 (Weston-super-Mare).
- Chief Engine Room Artificer John William Buswell, P/MX.47892.
- Chief Engine Room Artificer Raymond Ernest Hart, P/MX.48917 (East Wittering).
- Chief Engine Room Artificer Albert George Histed, P/M.23489 (Stockport).
- Chief Engine Room Artificer George Harry Freeman Pickering, D/MX.51427 (Basingstoke).
- Chief Engine Room Artificer John Wright, C/M.2923 (Felixstowe).
- Temporary Acting Chief Mechanician Harry Salt, D/KX.76464 (St. Austell).
- Chief Stoker John Henry Boynton, C/KX.76956 (Cambois, Northumberland).
- Chief Stoker Edward Budgen, P/347893 (Iver, Buckinghamshire).
- Chief Stoker William Henry Dixon, D/K.2558 (Barry, Glamorganshire).
- Chief Stoker John Evans, D/K.5815 (Manchester).
- Chief Stoker Harold Arthur Udell, P/K.63735.
- Chief Electrical Artificer William James Coleman, P/M.13983.
- Chief Electrical Artificer John Grassland Haigh, D/M.38281 (Rosyth).
- Chief Electrical Artificer Colin Stevens Westaway, D/MX.47235 (Plymouth).
- Chief Electrical Artificer James Henry Williams, C/M.39319.
- Acting Chief Electrical Artificer Leonard Frank Marcel Horn, P/MX.52654.
- Chief Ordnance Artificer Ronald Edward Lillington, D/MX.47810 (Plymouth).
- Chief Armourer Henry William Baker, C/M.5486 (Welling).
- Chief Engineman John Robert Scott Bulmer, LT/X.10383 S. (Sunderland).
- Chief Engineman Tasker Brier Scott, LT/X.4018 T. (Hull).
- Acting Chief Engineman Alexander William Gibson, L/X.426 E.U. (Fraserburgh, Aberdeenshire).
- Second Hand John William Leask, LT/JX.265406 (Hamna Voe, Shetland).
- Chief Shipwright Herbert William Holwell, D/MX.46922 (Plymouth).
- Chief Shipwright Edwin Jesse Perrin, C/346899 (Horley, Surrey).
- Sick Berth Chief Petty Officer Charles Henry Cossins, P/M.5846 (Ryde, Isle of Wight).
- Sick Berth Chief Petty Officer Percy Francis Gisbert Harling, P/M.51944 (Dumfries).
- Sick Berth Chief Petty Officer Clifford John Scoble, D/M.39283 (Billacombe, Plymouth).
- Sick Berth Chief Petty Officer John Stranks, C/M.3527.
- Sick Berth Chief Petty Officer Bertram Ellwood Stubbs, P/M. 18411 (Douglas, Isle of Man).
- Chief Petty Officer Writer Norman Ayre, C/MX.47547.
- Chief Petty Officer Writer Frederick John Bossom, D/MX.45833 (Devonport).
- Chief Petty Officer Writer Charles Arthur Genge, C/347964.
- Chief Petty Officer Writer Aubrey MacGregor Oakford, P/MX.46369.
- Chief Petty Officer Writer John Henry Pearcy, C/M.27007 (Windsor).
- Chief Petty Officer Writer Frederick Sidney Perrott, D/MX.45463 (Plymouth).
- Chief Petty Officer Writer Arthur Joseph Smith, C/M.37181.
- Chief Petty Officer Writer Reginald Herbert Tomlin, C/M.25560 (Rochester).
- Chief Petty Officer Writer Charles Tunstall, P/MX.47195 (Portsmouth).
- Supply Chief Petty Officer Frederick James Clark, D/M.39183 (St. Budeaux, Plymouth).
- Supply Chief Petty Officer Edward Thomas Finlay Jezzard, 6/343412 (London, N.8).
- Supply Chief Petty Officer Ernest Sidney Johnson, R.C.N. 40432 (Victoria, B.C.).
- Supply Chief Petty Officer Edward Winston Kimber, P/MX.47415 (Gosport).
- Supply Chief Petty Officer Joseph Eric White, P/MX.450673.
- Supply Chief Petty Officer (now Warrant Supply Officer) Charles Thomas Wright, C/M.38241 (Streatham).
- Master-at-Arms Frank George Bowman, P/M. 35739 (Warsash, Hampshire).
- Master-at-Arms Percy Scargill Burton, P/M 35783 (Sheffield).
- Master-at-Arms Leonard Charles Chappell, P/M.39817 (Portsmouth).
- Master-at-Arms Frank Joseph Dahl, C/M.36383 (East Ham).
- Master-at-Arms William George Miller, P/M.39163 (Gosport).
- Master-at-Arms Walter Geoffrey Phillips, P/M.40186 (Edinburgh).
- Master-at-Arms James Walsh, C/M.39723.
- Chief Petty Officer Cook (S) Ernest John Cooke, D/MX.49356.
- Chief Petty Officer Cook (S) William James Wing, D/MX.57291 (Liskeard, Cornwall).
- Chief Petty Officer Cook Ernest Francis Symons, D/M.12282.
- Chief Petty Officer Steward William Stephen Fincher, C/L.13845 (Gillingham).
- Chief Petty Officer Steward Emmanuel Zahra, Malta E/LX.21160.
- Engine Room Artificer Third Class George William Hockney, P/MX.61611 (Peterborough).
- Chief Wren Clare Ellen Vaughan, 11540, WRNS.
- Chief Wren Cook (S) Kathleen May Kimber, 619, WRNS. (Portsmouth).
- Chief Wren Cook Mary Buchan Matches, 9208, WRNS.
- Sergeant (Acting Regimental Sergeant Major) Ernest John Belcher, Royal Marines, Po.X.252.
- Colour Sergeant (Acting Temporary Regimental Quartermaster Sergeant) Edward William Syrett, Royal Marines, Ch.X.180.
- Colour Sergeant George Robert Burden, Royal Marines, Ply.X.92 (Deal).
- Temporary Sergeant (Acting Temporary Colour Sergeant) Frederick Hunt, Royal Marines, Po.212897 (Tunbridge Wells).
- Sergeant (Acting Temporary Colour Sergeant) Albert Edwin Best, Royal Marines, Ply.X.189 (Hayling Island).
- Sergeant (Acting Temporary Colour Sergeant) Tames Gardner, Royal Marines, Po.19435 (Mill Hill East).
- Temporary Corporal (Acting Temporary Colour Sergeant) Thomas Robinson, Royal Marines, Po.X.101324.
- Petty Officer William Edisbury, D/J.111416.
- Petty Officer Oliver Conway Edwards, P/J.15490 (Fleet).
- Petty Officer Robert Greig, R/JX.177411 (Stromness, Orkney).
- Petty Officer Harry George Hoskins, P/JX.130516 (Porchester).
- Petty Officer William Archie Keeler, P/238093 (Swingfield, near Dover).
- Petty Officer William Thomas Millman, D/JX.133595.
- Petty Officer John Henry Mulley, C/213050 (Sidcup).
- Petty Officer William Reay, D/6823 C. (Maryport, Cumberland).
- Petty Officer Alec John Smith, P/JX.127372 (Bedhampton).
- Petty Officer Sydney Horace Tonkin, P/J 109981 (Copnor).
- Petty Officer James Henry Warran, D/JX.134002.
- Petty Officer Albert James Webb, P/J.112438 (Warminster).
- Temporary Petty Officer Robert Stanley Childs, P/SSX.23352 (Woking).
- Temporary Petty Officer Dennis Fitzsimmons, X.18678 A. (Donaghadee, Co. Down).
- Temporary Petty Officer Walter Victor Hold way, D/J.107038 (Newton Abbot).
- Acting Petty Officer (A) Arthur John Scott Neller, P/J.106844 (Bury).
- Temporary Yeoman of Signals Joseph Hothersall, C/JX.230749 (Preston).
- Petty Officer Telegraphist William Compton, C/J.40692 (Streatham).
- Engine Room Artificer Fourth Class Leonard Nash, P/MX.79287 (Hampton, Middlesex).
- Stoker Petty Officer Leslie Alfred Baker, P/KX.92971 (Porchester).
- Stoker Petty Officer Clement Byrne Delany, D/KX.79177 (Bristol).
- Stoker Petty Officer Ernest Richard Relland Lock, P/K.13654 (Totnes).
- Mechanician First Class Arthur John Barber, C/K.66942 (Chatham).
- Mechanician First Class William George Welch, P/K.66735 (Gosport).
- Petty Officer Air Mechanic Joseph Boyle, FAA/FX.75213 (Littlehampton).
- Petty Officer Wireman Ronald Douglas Lee, C/MX.65247 (Sheerness).
- Sick Berth Petty Officer William Hodgson, D/SBR.2436 (Adlington, Lancashire).
- Sick Berth Petty Officer Reginald George Young, P/M.21585 (Hackbridge, Surrey).
- Temporary Sick Berth Petty Officer Herbert Ernest Brice, D/SBR/X.6117 (Bristol).
- Supply Petty Officer George James Walford, C/MX.59765 (Witham, Essex).
- Temporary Supply Petty Officer Irwin Henry Binnington, P/MX.50199 (Birmingham).
- Temporary Regulating Petty Officer Thomas Alfred Dickinson, C/MX.52432 (Sheffield).
- Petty Officer Wren Henrietta Cameron, 2105, WRNS. (Glasgow).
- Petty Officer Wren Anna Lang Leithead, 12925, WRNS. (Kirn, Argyllshire).
- Petty Officer Wren Rosalind Kathleen Stratford, 1545, WRNS. (Plymouth).
- Petty Officer Wren Steward (O) Agnes Moyes, 2247, WRNS. (Cardenden, Fife).
- Quartermaster Sergeant (Temporary) William Robert Ransome, Royal Marines, Po.215507 (Broadstone).
- Sergeant (Temporary) (Acting Temporary Quartermaster Sergeant) Walter Henry Lewis, Royal Marines, Ex.4756 (Newport, Monmouthshire).
- Sergeant Frederick Charles Barker, Royal Marines, Po.X.404 (Sheerness).
- Sergeant Herbert William Belson, Royal Marines, Ch.24384 (Bishop Sutton).
- Sergeant Raymond George Cook, Royal Marines, Ch.24385.
- Sergeant William Darton Deeble, Royal Marines, Ply.X.569 (St. Austell).
- Sergeant (Temporary) John James Longwell, Royal Marines, Ch.24818 (Glasgow).
- Corporal (Temporary) (Acting Sergeant) Cecil Raymond Damage, Royal Marines, Ply.21802 (Lower Willingdon, Sussex).
- Corporal (Temporary) (Acting Temporary Sergeant) Harold Roy Edmondson, Royal Marines, Ex.556 (Wigan).
- Corporal (Acting Temporary Sergeant) Edward James Hardy, Royal Marines, Po.X.100398 (London).
- Temporary Corporal (Acting Temporary Sergeant) Samuel Shaw, Royal Marines, Po.X.104771 (Bradford).
- Temporary Corporal (Acting Temporary Sergeant) Victor Harold Sproston, Royal Marines, Ply.X.101415 (St. Judes, Plymouth).
- Temporary Acting Leading Seaman George Richard Swift, C/JX.125902 (London, N.I).
- Leading Telegraphist Stanley James Martin, C/J.20891 (Hawking).
- Temporary Acting Leading Stoker Humphrey Hicks, D/KX.111967 (St. Albans).
- Temporary Acting Leading Stoker Patrick McDonnell, P/KX.127431 (Stirling).
- Leading Wren Amy Allan Patoh, 11281, WRNS. (Shanklin).
- Marine (Acting Temporary Corporal) John Thomas Moore, Royal Marines, Ply.X.120402 (T) (Dudley).
- Able Seaman Alban Joseph Barnes, D/JX.201715 (St. Mary's, Newfoundland).
- Able Seaman Owen Brooks, C/J.55464 (Manningtree, Essex).
- Able Seaman William James Jackson, P/JX.182187 (Boston, Lincolnshire).
- Telegraphist Bertie John Wheatley, C/JX.248191 (South Norwood).
- Stoker First Class Thomas Atherton, LT/KX.105630 (Stockport).
- Stoker Robert Bernard Wilson, LT/KX.140882 (Colne, Lancashire).
- Sick Berth Attendant William Ogden, P/MX.80664 (Peacehaven).
- Ordinary Seaman George Walton, D/JX.345076 (Manchester).
- Ordinary Telegraphist Dan Glyndwr Powell, D/JX.247065 (Pontypridd).
- Marine Thomas Nelson, Royal Marines, Ply.X.102809 (Wishaw).
- Master-at-Arms Thomas William Hughes, Royal New Zealand Navy.

=== Army ===
- No. 2062242 Staff Sergeant Albert Thomas Adams, Royal Artillery.
- No. 7690412 Sergeant (acting Regimental Sergeant Major) George Agass, Corps of Military Police.
- No. 73307 Corporal Joseph Henry Allen, Royal Army Service Corps.
- No. 2651901 Sergeant William Alston, Royal Army Medical Corps.
- Sergeant John Ammonds, Radnor Home Guard.
- No. 5726102 Company Quartermaster Sergeant William Frank Charles Anderson, The Dorsetshire Regiment.
- No. 7684079 Sergeant Frederick Cecil Banks, Corps of Military Police.
- Battery Quartermaster Sergeant Frederick Barker, York Home Guard.
- No. 239V Temporary Sergeant Robert Barras, South African Armoured Corps.
- No. S/5575503 Sergeant (acting Staff Sergeant) Authony William Richard Bates, Royal Army Service Corps.
- No. 3194376 Lance Corporal James Bathgate, Royal Engineers.
- Acting Battery. Sergeant Major Dan Bauchi, Royal West African Frontier Force.
- No. 7928573 Staff Sergeant Leo Bean, Royal Armoured Corps.
- Sergeant Stanley Reginald Beckett, Buckinghamshire Home Guard.
- No. 3762743 Staff Sergeant Thomas James Beckett, Royal Electrical & Mechanical Engineers.
- No. 5770292 Private Frederick William Bell, Army Catering Corps.
- Sergeant Ernest Benfield, Lincolnshire Home Guard.
- No. 7261330 Corporal (acting Sergeant) Thomas Charles Benton, Royal Army Medical Corps.
- No. 4852506 Colour Sergeant Nathaniel Berry, The Leicestershire Regiment.
- No. 3125503 Sergeant William Stephen Berryman, The Royal Scots Fusiliers.
- No. 212098 Staff Sergeant Harry Joseph Newton Bingham, East African Electrical & Mechanical Engineers.
- No. 2581045 Corporal (Lance Sergeant) Herbert Edgar Birt, Royal Corps of Signals.
- No. 3853151 Sergeant Norman Birtwistle, The Loyal Regiment (North Lancashire).
- No. 4451775 Bombardier (Lance Sergeant) Charles Bowman, Royal Artillery.
- No. 6196099 Colour Sergeant Richard James Seymour Boyce, The Royal Ulster Rifles.
- Sergeant Archibald Frederick Charles Boyes, Surrey Home Guard.
- No. 860728 Sergeant Donald Harry Arthur Bray, Royal Electrical & Mechanical Engineers.
- No. 6104153 Sergeant Evan Brewer, DCM, The Queen's Royal, Regiment (West Surrey).
- No. 4196144 Private (acting Corporal) Thomas John Briggs, The Royal Welch Fusiliers.
- No. 1068902 Armament Artificer Staff-Sergeant Arthur Rhodes Jackson Broadbent, Royal Electrical & Mechanical Engineers.
- No. 3859208 Sergeant Frank Brookes, Royal Engineers.
- No. 1894039 Sergeant Leslie Bromley, Royal Engineers.
- No. 1456263 Staff Sergeant Alan Thompson Browning, Royal Artillery.
- No. 4455761 Sergeant John Brownley, The Black Watch (Royal Highland Regiment).
- No. G.C./62544 Sergeant William Henry Nmui Buckman, West African Army Medical Corps.
- No. W/151599 Sergeant Grace Irene Burden, Auxiliary Territorial Service.
- Sergeant Frederick Charles Burgess, Berkshire Home Guard.
- Company Quartermaster Sergeant Richard George Burgess, Essex Home Guard.
- Sergeant George Burnet, Dumfriesshire Home Guard.
- No. 4909660 Sergeant Reginald James Burston, Army Catering Corps.
- No. 2207881 Lance Bombardier William Harold Buss, Royal Artillery.
- No. 907650 Sergeant Leonard Samuel Calicut, Royal Artillery.
- Company Quartermaster Sergeant (Colour Sergeant) Thomas Capenhurst, Surrey Home Guard.
- Sergeant David Anderson Carslaw, Cheshire Home Guard.
- Sergeant William Bamfield Carslake, Kent Home Guard.
- No. 4912540 Sergeant John Casey, The South Staffordshire Regiment.
- No. 91870 Corporal Eric James Chamberlain, Royal Army Service Corps.
- No. W/10431 Sergeant Margaret Palmer Chapman, Auxiliary Territorial Service.
- No. S/161247 Staff Sergeant (acting Staff Quartermaster Sergeant) Roylance John Chapman, Royal Army Service Corps.
- No. 760306 Staff Sergeant John Charles Cheshire, Royal Electrical & Mechanical Engineers.
- Company Quartermaster Sergeant Thomas Frederick George Clark, Surrey Home Guard.
- No. 7620205 Sergeant Victor Charles Coley, Royal Electrical & Mechanical Engineers.
- No. 1879940 Staff Sergeant Henry Reginald Colgate, Royal Army Service Corps.
- No. 2315859 Sergeant Walter William Colley, Royal Corps of Signals.
- No. 2147679 Staff Sergeant Walter John Collings, Royal Engineers.
- Colour Sergeant George Haydn Collins, Hampshire Home Guard.
- No. S/285425 Staff Sergeant William Henry Leonard Cook, Royal Army Service Corps.
- No. 2734181 Colour Sergeant (acting Orderly Room Quartermaster Sergeant) John Roderick Cooke, Welsh Guards.
- No. 1472567 Staff Sergeant Thomas Ernest Cookson, Royal Artillery.
- Sergeant Frederick Leopold Cooper, Oxfordshire Home Guard.
- No. W/21119 Sergeant Joan Patricia Sheila Cooper, Auxiliary Territorial Service.
- Ca.2400 Enlisted Asian Clerk Constancie Rodrigues Cota, The King's African Rifles.
- No. 7366569 Sergeant (acting Warrant Officer Class II) Sidney John Coulson, Army Educational Corps.
- No. 7623693 Sergeant Lindsay Harvey Craig, Royal Electrical & Mechanical Engineers.
- No. S/63365 Sergeant (acting Staff Quartermaster Sergeant) Donald Crane, Royal Army Service Corps.
- No. 10532199 Sergeant John Cross, Royal Army Ordnance Corps.
- No. 2340791 Lance Corporal Ronald Arthur Cuthbert, Royal Artillery.
- No. 3655765 Sergeant Alexander Orme Davies, Royal Corps of Signals.
- No. 2613229 Sergeant Thomas Debnam, Reconnaissance Regiment.
- No. 7688775 Sergeant (acting Company Sergeant Major) Percy Lewis Debling, Intelligence Corps.
- Sergeant Frank Leonard Derrick, Gloucestershire Home Guard.
- No. 5931183 Company Quartermaster Sergeant Wilfred Herbert Dixon, The Suffolk Regiment.
- No. 1927752 Sergeant Percy Robert Douglas, Royal Engineers.
- Sergeant Thomas James Downes, MM, Essex Home Guard.
- No. 132251 Staff Sergeant Raymond Cyril Downey, Royal Army Service Corps.
- No. 1059332 Sergeant Albert Downham, Royal Artillery.
- No. 7523457 Corporal Charles George Dowse, Royal Army Medical Corps.
- No. 92936V Corporal (temporary Sergeant) Cyril Herbert Dowse, South African Armoured Corps.
- No. 1722393 Sergeant Kenneth Drewery, Royal Artillery.
- Sergeant Arthur John Duke, Pontypool Home Guard.
- No. 1867249 Company Quartermaster Sergeant William Alwyn Earl, Royal Engineers.
- No. 7687287 Sergeant Robert William Ede, Corps of Military Police.
- Sergeant (now Second Lieutenant) William Henry Edwards, Kent Home Guard.
- Sergeant Samuel Elwell, Staffordshire Home Guard.
- No. 4745406 Sergeant Albert Ensor, Royal Artillery.
- No. 1948875 Staff Sergeant Herbert Archibald Evans, East African Engineers.
- No. 4808971 Staff Sergeant Reginald Thomas Everett, Royal Engineers.
- No. W/20124 Sergeant Edith Mary Fisher, Auxiliary Territorial Service.
- Company Quartermaster Sergeant William Harold Fleming, Kent Home Guard.
- Private William Edward Frahkis, Wiltshire Home Guard.
- No. 640219 Staff Sergeant Elizabeth Fretwell, Voluntary Aid Detachment.
- No. 5052180 Private Leslie Thomas Frost, Army Catering Corps.
- No. 6984407 Private (acting Corporal) John Fulton, Royal Army Medical Corps.
- No. 5875076 Staff Sergeant Charles Edward Geary, Royal Army Ordnance Corps.
- No. 3952414 Sergeant David Rees George, The Welch Regiment.
- Sergeant Hubert Lewis Gibbs, Banbury Home Guard.
- Sergeant Harry Grafton, West Riding Home Guard.
- Sergeant William Ernest Gray, MM, Kent Home Guard.
- Company Quartermaster Sergeant John Greig, Edinburgh Home Guard.
- No. 3235062 Sergeant Waiter Grieve, The Cameroflians (Scottish Rifles).
- No. 4684894 Sergeant Tom Grinsill, The King's Own Yorkshire Light Infantry.
- No. 4911308 Corporal Leslie Gullick, The South Staffordshire Regiment.
- No. S/2822553 Sergeant (acting Staff Sergeant) Alexander Gunn, Royal Army Service Corps.
- No. 4033245 Sergeant Richard Albert Hall, The King's Shropshire Light Infantry.
- No. 7592392 Sergeant (acting Staff Sergeant) Thomas Henry Hamer, Royal Electrical & Mechanical Engineers.
- No. 3057005 Corporal James Hamilton, Army Catering Corps.
- Lance Corporal Edwin Charles Hancock, Glamorganshire Home Guard.
- No. 7647979 Staff Sergeant (acting Staff Quartermaster Sergeant) George Charles Harding, Royal Electrical & Mechanical Engineers.
- No. 4794024 Sergeant John Harris, Royal Artillery.
- No. 1481298 Sergeant William Hart, Royal Army Service Corps.
- No. 7625987 Sergeant Peter Richard Harvey, Royal Electrical & Mechanical Engineers.
- No. 1468459 Battery Quartermaster Sergeant Thomas Musther Hayden, Royal Artillery.
- No. 7075076 Private John Hayes, The Border Regiment.
- No. 6090920 Sergeant Ronald Stephen Hayward, Royal Artillery.
- Private Benjamin Heaton, Lancaster Home Guard.
- No. 7640114 Sergeant Douglas Raymond Henman, Royal Electrical & Mechanical Engineers.
- Lance Corporal Paul Francis Henry Hickman, Northants Home Guard.
- No. 1010299 Bombardier (Lance Sergeant) Harry Hilton, Royal Artillery.
- No. 6896603 Bombardier (Lance Sergeant) Henry John Holborrow, Royal Artillery.
- No. 2036700 Sergeant Kenneth William Patterson Hollis, Army Physical Training Corps.
- No. 2319812 Sergeant James Holmes, Royal Corps of Signals.
- No. 2063214 Sergeant Percy William Hope, Royal Artillery.
- Sergeant James Hopkins, Glamorganshire Home Guard.
- Sergeant Stephen Henry Hortis, Kent Home Guard.
- Sergeant Francis Howarth, Westmorland Home Guard.
- No. 1600787 Sapper Samuel John Howells, Royal Engineers.
- No. 933401 Staff Sergeant (acting Sergeant Major) Frederick Hughes, Royal Artillery.
- No. W/13636 Staff Sergeant Noreen Hutcheon, Auxiliary Territorial Service.
- No. W/26365 Staff Sergeant (acting Staff Quartermaster Sergeant) Kathleen Barbara Ingham, Auxiliary Territorial Service.
- Sergeant Frank Marshall Ivins, Monmouthshire Home Guard.
- Corporal Stanley Jacques, Staffordshire Home Guard.
- Sergeant William James, Derbyshire Home Guard.
- Private Charles Jennings, MM, Cornwall Home Guard.
- No. S/14248603 Corporal John William George Joel, Royal Army Service Corps.
- No. 2339784 Sergeant (acting Company Quartermaster Sergeant) Henry Johnson, Royal Corps of Signals.
- No. 47030 Driver Jared Johnston, Royal Army Service Corps.
- No. 7345985 Staff Sergeant (acting Warrant Officer Class II) Albert Robert Douglas Jones, Royal Army Medical Corps.
- No. 3914665 Sergeant Dilwyn Jones, Pioneer Corps.
- No. 832470 Sergeant William James Kelly, Royal Artillery.
- No. 2734082 Sergeant Albert Edward Kempson, Welsh Guards.
- Company Quartermaster Sergeant Alfred Thomas King, Suffolk Home Guard.
- No. S/109587 Staff Sergeant (acting Staff Sergeant Major) Sydney Thomas King, Royal Army Service Corps.
- Sergeant William King, South Staffordshire Home Guard.
- No. S/5957853 Sergeant (acting Staff Sergeant) Charles Frederick Knight, Royal Army Services Corps.
- No. 3385024 Private Ernest Leach, The East Lancashire Regiment.
- Sergeant Sidney Albert Leary, Derbyshire Home Guard.
- No. 4196962 Corporal (Lance Sergeant) William Charles Lehmann, The Royal Welch Fusiliers.
- No. 4122340 Corporal Leonard Leigh, The Cheshire Regiment.
- No. 925094 Sergeant (acting Staff Sergeant) Clifford Lewis, Royal Artillery.
- No. W/41959 Sergeant Lilian May Ling, Auxiliary Territorial Service.
- No. 4385293 Company Quartermaster Sergeant Robert Linsley, Parachute Regiment, Army Air Corps.
- No. S/130663 Staff Sergeant (acting Staff Quartermaster Sergeant) Arthur Leonard Lovell, Royal Army Service Corps.
- No. 5179017 Sergeant Reginald Henry Low, Royal Corps of Signals.
- Sergeant John Berchman Lynch, Gloucestershire Home Guard.
- Sergeant John Murdo Maclean, Hebrides Home Guard.
- No. S/126962 Staff Sergeant Leonard William Mady, Royal Army Service Corps.
- No. 10473 Acting Regimental Sergeant Major Chari Maigumari, MM, Royal West African Frontier Force.
- No. 25414 Acting Battery Sergeant Major Abduialai Mango, Royal West African Frontier Force.
- No. 2574751 Lance Corporal Herbert Mann, Royal Corps of Signals.
- No. 4861420 Sergeant Douglas William Marshall, The Leicestershire Regiment.
- No. 13337 Sergeant Samuel Marson, Pioneer Corps.
- No. 3649956 Acting Company Sergeant Major Joseph McParlan, Parachute Regiment, Army Air Corps.
- No. 6089091 Sergeant Thomas Charles Miles, Royal Artillery.
- No. 2034989 Sergeant Robert Mills, Royal Artillery.
- No. S/292095 Corporal (acting Sergeant) Geoffrey Eric Mitchell, Royal Army Service Corps.
- Sergeant William Edward Mitchell, Shropshire Home Guard.
- No. 8253 Staff Sergeant Naja Mobed, Women's Auxiliary Corps (India).
- No. 108347 Naik/Fitter Mian Mohammed, Royal Indian Army Service Corps.
- Corporal John Henry Moore, Lancashire Home Guard.
- Sergeant William Magner Moroney, Kent Home Guard.
- No. 57384 Corporal Laurence Morris, Royal Army Service Corps.
- Gunner Robert Mullen, Renfrewshire Home Guard.
- Sergeant Edgar Stanley Mullins, Cheshire Home Guard.
- No. S/277282 Staff Sergeant Edward Kendall Mumford, Royal Army Service Corps.
- No. 1500295 Battery Quartermaster Sergeant William Murphy, Royal Artillery.
- No. 3126867 Fusilier James Nash, The Royal Scots Fusiliers.
- Sergeant John Robert Nicolson, Zetland Home Guard.
- No. 2320953 Company Quartermaster Sergeant Norman Frank Nicolson, Royal Corps of Signals.
- No. 7262415 Sergeant Edward Norris, Royal Army Medical Corps.
- No. 7676094 Sergeant (acting Staff Sergeant) John Orriss, Royal Army Pay Corps.
- No. 1482367 Bombardier William Charles Slorach Patton, Royal Artillery.
- No. 3131402 Sergeant George Seymour Pawson, The Royal Scots Fusiliers.
- Colour Sergeant Walter Frederick Herbert Payne, Exeter Home Guard.
- Company Quartermaster Sergeant William Henry Pearson, Lancashire Home Guard.
- No. 4908852 Sergeant Albert Peers, The South Staffordshire Regiment.
- No. S/75741 Staff Sergeant Harry Stuart Pettit, Royal Army Service Corps.
- No. 871992 Sergeant Anthony Philbin, Royal Artillery.
- No. 1573307 Battery Quartermaster Sergeant Andrew Porteous Philip, Royal Artillery.
- No. 5102553 Sergeant Howard Clay Pickering, The Royal Warwickshire Regiment.
- No. 6288632 Sergeant Charles Middleweek Poole, The Buffs (Royal East Kent Regiment).
- No. 4809239 Private Robert Edward Poole, The Lincolnshire Regiment.
- Sergeant Archibald Harrison Pope, Cheshire Home Guard.
- No. 2589601 Company Quartermaster Sergeant (acting Company Sergeant Major) William Hunter Potts, Royal Corps of Signals.
- No. 502085 Nursing Member Grade I Edith Mary Price, Voluntary Aid Detachment.
- No. S/252583 Sergeant Charles Henry Prior, Royal Army Service Corps.
- No. S/152096 Sergeant Kenneth Quelch, Royal Army Service Corps.
- No. 21056 Acting Battery Sergeant Major Jibbo Quenne, Royal West African Frontier Force.
- No. 903959 Naik Beli Ram, Royal Indian Army Service Corps.
- No. 6200332 Sergeant John William Rawlinson, The Middlesex Regiment (Duke of Cambridge's Own).
- No. 2558978 Sergeant William Leonard Reed, Royal Corps of Signals.
- No. S/280889 Sergeant (acting Staff Sergeant) George William Reeks, Royal Army Service Corps.
- No. 7536071 Staff Sergeant Edwin Seddon Reeve, The Army Dental Corps.
- Sergeant Stanley Merlyn Reeves, Warwickshire Home Guard.
- No. 2873349 Sergeant (acting Battery Sergeant Major) William Reilly, Royal Artillery.
- No. 1430261 Sergeant Ernest Smeaton Richardson, Royal Artillery.
- Vo. 1534788 Sergeant John Booth Richardson, Royal Artillery.
- No. 62954 Company Quartermaster Sergeant Henry Norman Richmond, Royal Army Services Corps.
- No. 181760 Sergeant Walter Herman Riley, Royal Army Service Corps.
- No. W/12142 Sergeant Muriel Rose Rixon, Auxiliary Territorial Service.
- Sergeant George Rowe, Warwickshire Home Guard.
- No. 6198400 Sergeant William Lawrence Sargent, Corps of Military Police.
- No. 7647814 Staff Sergeant John Patrick Savage, Royal Army Ordnance Corps.
- Sergeant George Joseph Thomas Shaw, Warwickshire Home Guard.
- Sergeant Arthur Hough Short, Northumberland Home Guard.
- No. 4926989 Sergeant (acting Company Sergeant Major) Harold Shufflebotham, The South Staffordshire Regiment.
- No. 2200068 Sergeant Joseph George Samuel Simmonds, Royal Artillery.
- No. 977261 Havildar Sujan Singh, Royal Indian Army Service Corps.
- No. W/12956 Sergeant Emily Slater, Auxiliary Territorial Service.
- No. W/1155 Sergeant (acting Staff Sergeant) Emily Smith, Auxiliary Territorial Service.
- No. 899886 Quartermaster Sergeant Sydney George Spooner, Royal Electrical & Mechanical Engineers.
- No. 861184 Sergeant (acting Colour Sergeant) Harold Robert Grange Standish, Army Air Corps.
- No. 39357 Sergeant Alice Mary Steeds, Auxiliary Territorial Service.
- No. 2816326 Sergeant Joseph Stephens, The Seaforth Highlanders (Rossshire Buffs, The Duke of Albany's).
- No. 3238525 Rifleman Edwin Gordon Stephenson, The Cameronians (Scottish Rifles).
- No. 2046696 Sergeant Albert Horace Stockley, Royal Artillery.
- Sergeant William George Strong, Kent Home Guard.
- No. W/9143 Staff Sergeant Mabel Kathleen Stubbs, Auxiliary Territorial Service.
- No. 6284291 Corporal (Lance Sergeant) Edward Stupple, The Worcestershire Regiment.
- No. 103836 Staff Sergeant (acting Warrant Officer Class I) William Sumpter, Royal Engineers.
- No. 4536524 Colour Sergeant (acting Company Sergeant Major) Wilfred Sidney Sykes, Parachute Regiment, Army Air Corps.
- No. 1773456 Gunner (Lance Bombardier) Ivor Wilfred Tasker, Royal Artillery.
- No. 7379337 Private Elisha Thomas Taylor, Royal Army Medical Corps.
- Sergeant James Thompson, Anti-Aircraft Home Guard.
- Company Quartermaster Sergeant Ralph David Tulley, Sussex Home Guard.
- Sergeant William George Thwaites, Buckinghamshire Home Guard.
- No. 6396504 Private Edward George Tomlin, Parachute Regiment, Army Air Corps.
- No. 10667604 Corporal Arthur Edwin Tubb, Royal Engineers.
- Sergeant William John Charles Tunstall, Warwickshire Home Guard.
- Havildar/Clerk Mohendra Kuma Wadadar, Indian Engineers, Indian Army.
- Sergeant Edward Waite, Denbighshire Home Guard.
- No. 6525917 Colour Sergeant Edward Melville Waldron, The Royal Fusiliers (City of London Regiment).
- No. 6837438 Band Sergeant Robert George Walton, Irish Guards.
- No. 2033645 Bombardier Harold Victor White, Royal Artillery.
- No. 7266739 Staff Sergeant (now Warrant Officer Class II) John Thomas Whirtemore, Royal Army Medical Corps.
- No. 551343 Sergeant Joseph Samuel Williams, Royal Armoured Corps.
- No. W/14681 Sergeant Violet Williams, Auxiliary Territorial Service.
- Sergeant Arthur Ernest Wilsher, Glamorganshire Home Guard.
- No. 5246211 Sergeant John Withers, Royal Artillery.
- Sergeant Ernest Jesse Woodward, Gloucestershire Home Guard.
- No. 1554711 Bombardier (acting Sergeant) John James Woodward, Royal Artillery.
- No. W/20190 Staff Sergeant Margaret Elizabeth Youde, Auxiliary Territorial Services.
- No. 60873 Mechanist Staff Sergeant Peter Conrad Pratt Young, Royal Army Service Corps.

=== Royal Air Force ===
- 561067 Flight Sergeant Stanley Herbert Brayley.
- 562496 Flight Sergeant Richard Chantier.
- Aus.3913 Flight Sergeant Oswald Edward Ferguson, Royal Australian Air Force.
- 356848 Flight Sergeant Cyril Charles Flitt.
- 958516 Flight Sergeant Kenneth Raymond Gorton, RAFVR.
- 530006 Flight Sergeant Harry Hargreaves.
- 564861 Flight Sergeant James Brodshaw Irving.
- 770033 Flight Sergeant Leslie William Jones, RAFVR.
- 343847 Flight Sergeant Charles Henry Robert King.
- 364882 Flight Sergeant James Lloyd.
- 328396 Flight Sergeant Edward Frederic Mander.
- 710027 Flight Sergeant John Kenneth Marshall, RAFVR.
- 363195 Flight Sergeant Harry Horace Martin.
- 364765 Flight Sergeant Allan Richard Palmer.
- 518598 Flight Sergeant Edwin Warneford Reay.
- 1267189 Flight Sergeant Henry Benjamin Stukey, RAFVR.
- 1205689 Flight Sergeant Edward Coulson Tait, RAFVR.
- 564430 Flight Sergeant Herbert Frank Theobald.
- 570128 Flight Sergeant Richard James Winrow.
- 568608 Flight Sergeant Billy Yarnall.
- 949847 Acting Flight Sergeant Victor Bennett, RAFVR.
- 936217 Acting Flight Sergeant John Birss, RAFVR.
- 362381 Acting Flight Sergeant Harry Cecil Dormer.
- 940735 Acting Flight Sergeant Denis Arthur Hartwell, RAFVR.
- 539153 Acting Flight Sergeant John Jenkinson.
- 567762 Acting Flight Sergeant Herbert Atkinson Mills.
- 508310 Acting Flight Sergeant Jack Keers Raine.
- 944970 Acting Flight Sergeant John Forgan Rennie, RAFVR.
- 570090 Acting Flight Sergeant Jack Cyril Swann.
- 776656 Sergeant Emanuele Aquilina.
- 1462808 Sergeant William Arthur Bridges, RAFVR.
- 843945 Sergeant Leslie Charles Thomas Bulport, Auxiliary Air Force.
- 816035 Sergeant Robert Clarke, Auxiliary Air Force.
- 540857 Sergeant Loudon Davidson.
- 326384 Sergeant Frederick Robert Godley.
- 335303 Sergeant Albert Edward Greentree.
- 904866 Sergeant William Frederick Hutson, RAFVR.
- 1247101 Sergeant Ernest Kenner, RAFVR.
- 978140 Sergeant Arthur Leigh, RAFVR.
- 206399 Sergeant James Edward Mitchel.
- 1175298 Sergeant Sidney Moys, RAFVR.
- Aus.10053 Sergeant Alfred Howard Prout, Royal Australian Air Force.
- 529829 Sergeant Leonard Quarmby.
- 643945 Sergeant Albert Roberts.
- 560982 Sergeant Albert Charles George Salter.
- 1078127 Sergeant Bernard Joseph Seaman, RAFVR.
- 819045 Sergeant James Arthur Seaman, Auxiliary Air Force.
- 917939 Sergeant David George Smith, RAFVR.
- 1104135 Sergeant Joseph Ward, RAFVR.
- 639065 Sergeant Frank Webb.
- 980885 Sergeant Patrick Stewart Wilson, RAFVR.
- 3710 Sergeant Thomas Farrar Witty.
- 976879 Acting Sergeant Charles Basil Oliver, RAFVR.
- 1074985 Corporal John Henry Bailey, RAFVR.
- 1274543 Corporal George Gerrard Barnes, RAFVR.
- 1156691 Corporal Edward Sydney Brooks, RAFVR.
- 1228999 Corporal George Stephen Cooper, RAFVR.
- 748859 Corporal Edwin Harold Gowen Douse, RAFVR.
- 872308 Corporal Walter Henry Garner, Auxiliary Air Force.
- 1292420 Corporal Thomas Donald Gregory, RAFVR.
- 863474 Corporal Victor George Horner, Auxiliary Air Force.
- 991477 Corporal Peter Hutchison, RAFVR.
- 1174692 Corporal Godfrey Page, RAFVR.
- 950892 Corporal Stanley George Rowley Pitts, RAFVR.
- 857279 Corporal Alfred Sharpies, Auxiliary Air Force.
- 1443911 Corporal Lancelot John Smith, RAFVR.
- 1155063 Corporal Frank Edward Styles, RAFVR.
- 1444248 Acting Corporal Ernest Charles Henry Hoare, RAFVR.
- 1166289 Acting Corporal Horace Jackson, RAFVR.
- 1181429 Acting Corporal Frank Herbert Kernick, RAFVR.
- 931317 Acting Corporal Stanley James Martin, RAFVR.
- 1260134 Acting Corporal Trevor Morgan, RAFVR.
- 1166698 Leading Aircraftman Samuel Hywell Davies, RAFVR.
- 1277202 Leading Aircraftman William Henry Lewis, RAFVR.
- 962736 Leading Aircraftman William Rowland Strange, RAFVR.
- 1488548 Aircraftman 1st Class Joseph Ord, RAFVR.
- 897245 Sergeant Mary Isobel Boyd, Women's Auxiliary Air Force.
- 449631 Corporal Pamela Margerite Hanford, Women's Auxiliary Air Force.
- 440854 Leading Aircraftwoman Ruby Churchill, Women's Auxiliary Air Force.

== Civil Division ==
=== United Kingdom ===
- Ahmed Sali, Donkeyman, Merchant Navy.
- Arthur Aked, Chief Observer, Royal Observer Corps.
- Louis Alcantara, Local Chargeman of Engine Fitters, HM Dockyard, Gibraltar.
- Denis Strudwick Alexander, Production Foreman, Colvern Ltd.
- Francis Matthew Henry Alexander, Chief Steward, Merchant Navy.
- Frederick Samuel Allen, Boatswain's Mate, Merchant Navy.
- Thomas Allen, Station Master, London & North Eastern Railway Co., Darlington.
- George Almond, Yard Manager, Sir James Laing & Sons Ltd.
- John Anderson, Coal Miner, Broomhill Coal Co.
- William George Frederick Andrews, Chief Inspector, Air Raid Precautions Department, Bristol Constabulary.
- Ernest Arthur Ash, Officer-in-Charge, Civil Defence Report & Control Centre, Exeter.
- Margaret Vera Austin, Chargewoman, Royal Navy Cordite Factory, Holton Heath.
- Cyril Ayers, Carpenter, Merchant Navy.
- John Charles Bain, Boatswain, Merchant Navy.
- Thomas Baines, Ripper and Tunneller, St. Helens Collieries Ltd.
- George Baker, Emergency Repair Overseer (Inspector of Electrical Fitters), Admiralty.
- Peter Joseph Baldwin, Inspector of Storehousemen, Admiralty Outstation.
- Doris Mabel Ball, Female Staff Supervisor, Charles Churchill & Co. Ltd.
- Frederick George Wilson Ball, Foreman, Spear Bros. & Clark Ltd.
- James Ballard, Head Warehouse Foreman, Peter Keevil & Sons Ltd.
- Violet Ethel Eliza Balloch, Voluntary Canteen Worker, Southern Command.
- William Hector Barnes, Inspector (Leading Hand), Royal Aircraft Establishment.
- Wilfred Barraclough, Leading Core-maker, J. Blakeborough & Sons Ltd.
- William Barron, Chargehand Fitter, North British Engine Works.
- Colin Bartleet, Deputy Head Warden, Civil Defence Wardens' Service, Alvechurch.
- Edward Henry Barton, Deputy Foreman Typewriter Mechanic, HM Stationery Office.
- Cecil Batchelor, Shop Manager, Hall Telephone & Accessories Ltd.
- Samuel Charles Bates, Foreman, Ammunition Inspectorate, Ministry of Supply.
- Hubert James Leonard Battley, Office Keeper, Colonial Office & Dominions Office.
- John George Batty, General Works Foreman, Cellon Ltd.
- Thomas James Beall, Garage Foreman, HM Stationery Office.
- William Beggs, Donkeyman, Merchant Navy.
- James Bennett, Coal Face Worker, Markham No. 1 Colliery.
- Michael Bennett, Superintendent, Civil Defence Depot, Stanford-le-Hope, Essex.
- Henry Hubert Bird, Able Seaman and Lamp-trimmer, Merchant Navy.
- Kathleen Bizley, Machine Room Forewoman, J. Compton, Sons & Webb Ltd.
- Harold Blackburn, Skilled Engineer, English Electric Co. Ltd.
- William Albert Charles Blackhall Inspector, Engineer-in-Chief's Office, General Post Office.
- Carl Wilhelm Blanquist, Able Seaman, Merchant Navy.
- Martin Blanchfield, Boatswain, Merchant Navy.
- Robert Bolton, Workshop Assistant, Southern Railway Co., Ashford Works, Kent.
- Phillip Bonser, Operative, Hodgkin & Powers Ltd.
- John Arthur Douglas Bootiman, Senior CompanyOfficer (Area Welfare Officer) No. 17 (Bristol) Area, National Fire Service.
- Clarence Boscowitch, Boatswain, Merchant Navy.
- Daniel Morell Bouchereau, Boatswain, Merchant Navy.
- Ivy Mary Bowden, Foster Parent to Evacuee Children, Dulverton.
- Kathleen Mabel Boyland, Chargehand, General Electric Co. Ltd.
- John Francis Boyle, Chief Steward, Merchant Navy.
- John Brack, Chargeman Turner, John Dickinson & Sons Ltd.
- David Bradbury, Senior Artificer, Admiralty Research Laboratory.
- Joseph Brady, Foreman, A.B.C. Motors Ltd.
- Sidney James Bramish, Foreman, Lodge Plugs Ltd.
- John Briggs, Head Constable, Royal Ulster Constabulary.
- Walter Ernest Briggs, Assistant Steward, Merchant Navy.
- John Hellyar Brinton, Assistant Overseer, Grade I (Inspector of Shipwrights), Admiralty.
- Grace Bristol, Leading Engraver, McMichael Radio Ltd.
- Margaret Budgen, Chargehand, Dubilier Condenser Co. Ltd.
- Phyllis Annie Bunting, Assistant Supervisor (Telegraphs), Head Post Office, Aldershot.
- Ernest Aaron Burgess, Instructor-in-Charge, Army Technical School (Boys'), Arborfield.
- Allan Sharpies Burt, Boatswain, Merchant Navy.
- John Charles Butler, Overseer (Postal), Paddington District, General Post Office.
- Margaret Bryan Cairns, Assistant Supervisor Class II (Telephones), General Post Office, Londonderry, Northern Ireland.
- William Callaghan, Foreman Shipwright, Stockton Construction Co. Ltd.
- John Campbell, Fireman, Merchant Navy.
- Alfred Donald Campey, Chief Draughtsman, Cook, Welton & Gemmell Ltd.
- Bernard Canavan, Collier, Fife Coal Co.
- Hector John Hamilton Cardwell, Viewer, Royal Arsenal, Ministry of Supply, Woolwich.
- Dugald Carmichael, Head Foreman, North British Aluminium Co.
- John McCallum Carr, Quartermaster, Merchant Navy.
- James Carroll, Foreman, Mechanical Transport, War Office, Aldershot.
- Ernest William Carter, Master, Mountsorrel Public Assistance Institution.
- Leonard William George Carter, Chargehand, Royal Ordnance Factory, Ministry of Supply.
- Joseph Cass, Head Foreman Shipwright, John Readhead & Sons Ltd.
- William Charles Carton, Canteen Manager, Marconi Wireless Telegraph Co. Ltd.
- Frederick Palmer Chaddock, Artificer, Royal Naval Anti-Submarine Experimental Establishment, Fairlie.
- Alexander Wilton Charlish, Works Foreman, W. H. Smith & Co. (Electrical Engineers) Ltd.
- Ernest George Addison Clark, Timber Utilisation Officer, Ministry of Agriculture, Northern Ireland.
- Charles William Edward Clarke, Chargehand, Triumph Engineering Co. Ltd.
- Robert Leslie Cleland, Group Head Warden, Civil Defence Wardens Service, Barrow.
- Thomas Dobson Coates, Colliery Plumber, Easington Colliery.
- George Rae Cockburn, Observer, Royal Observer Corps.
- Thomas Archibald Leonard Cockwill, Boatswain, Merchant Navy.
- John Cole, Working Foreman Engineer, Jones' Buckie Slip & Shipyard Ltd.
- Alphonso John Collier, Steward, Merchant Navy.
- Charles Henry Connor, Inspector (Engineering), North West Telephone Area, Hampstead Telephone Exchange.
- Robert Stephenson Connor, Foreman Shipwright, Tyne Dock Engineering Co. Ltd.
- Lilian Cooksley, Superintendent, Balloon & Dinghy Factory, Elliott Equipment Ltd.
- Charles Henry Cooper, Clerk of Works, Royal Engineer Office, War Office.
- Cecil George Cordery, Radio Mechanic, General Electric Co. Ltd.
- Andrew George Cotton, General Foreman, Short Bros (Rochester & Bedford).
- Fred Cowan, Blacksmith, Leith Dock Commission.
- George Graves Cox, Chief Steward, Merchant Navy.
- George William Cox, Supervisor, Civil Aviation Department, Air Ministry.
- John Daniel Coyle, Ship's Cook, Merchant Navy.
- Frances Crawley, Labour Forewoman, Tate & Lyle Ltd.
- William Henry Crook, Section Leader, No. 29 (Preston) Area, National Fire Service.
- Ernest David Crowson, Tool Fitter, Ford Motor Co. Ltd.
- Louisa Jane Curtis, Supervisor, Telephone Operating School, General Post Office.
- Margaret Louisa Curtis, Manageress, Refreshment Club, Air Ministry.
- Thomas Curtis, Chief Baker, Merchant Navy.
- Gertrude Georgina Davies, Valve Polisher, Motor Components (Birmingham) Ltd.
- Ellen Davis, Manageress, Navy, Army & Air Force Institutes.
- James Albert Davis, Chargehand, Charlesworth Bodies (1931) Ltd.
- Percy Fleetwood Davis, Carpenter, Pauling & Co. Ltd.
- Walter Davis, Foreman Diver, Dover Works & Harbour Board.
- George Day, Foreman, Wolseley Motors Ltd.
- Walter James Denny, Head Foreman, Fraser & Chalmers Ltd.
- Cecil Edgar Randolph Dex, Goods Shunter, London, Midland & Scottish Railway Co., Toton Sidings.
- Mary Alice Dillon, Process Worker, Royal Ordnance Factory, Ministry of Supply.
- Nicholas George Dobson, Emergency Repair Overseer (Inspector of Shipwrights), Admiralty, Harwich.
- Thomas Donald, Donkeyman, Merchant Navy.
- Peter Donnelly, Inspector of Electrical Fitters, HM Naval Base, Lyness.
- Margaret Ellen Driver, Supervisor of Telephonists, Civil Defence Report & Control Centre, Battersea.
- William Drought, Brass Finisher, A. & R. Brown Ltd.
- Robert Bryce Sneddon Drysdale, Head Foreman Engineer, Grangemouth Dockyard Co. Ltd.
- James William Dubock, Foreman, Elliotts (Newbury).
- John Dunlop, Boatswain, Merchant Navy.
- Hector Henry Dyos, Emergency Repair Overseer, (Inspector of Shipwrights), Admiralty Outstation.
- Melvyn Dyte, Electrician, J. Jefferies & Sons Ltd.
- Harry Eaton, Manager, Navy, Army & Air Force Institutes.
- William Eaton, Foreman Shipwright, T. W. Greenwell & Co. Ltd.
- George Edgerton, Deputy Leader, Civil Defence Rescue & Demolition Party, Boldon.
- Frederick Albert Ellacott, Coastguardsman, HM Coastguard Service, Newquay.
- Henry James Ellaway, Depot Storeholder, Ministry of Supply.
- George Emslie, Foreman, Aberdeen Harbour Commissioners.
- John Fa, Hired Acting Leading Storehouseman, HM Victualling Yard, Gibraltar.
- Flower Elizabeth Fancliffe, Forewoman, Flax Factory, Ministry of Supply.
- Robert Fairnie, Jr, Skipper of a Motor Boat.
- Phillip Charlie Farrugia, Local Electrical Supervisor, HM Dockyard, Gibraltar.
- Alfred John Faupel, Surgical Instrument Maker, Allen & Hanburys Ltd.
- Reginald Leslie Fenton, Chief Mechanical Foreman, Avonmouth Docks.
- Percy Fielding, Assistant Overseer, Grade II, to the Admiralty Gun Mounting Overseer, N.E. Area.
- William Patrick Finch, Member, Rescue Party, Civil Defence Rescue Service, Plymouth.
- Mary Ann Finnigan, Machinist, Royal Ordnance Factory, Ministry of Supply.
- Thomas Wakeham Finson, General Foreman, Morgan Giles Ltd.
- Hiram Grassland Firth, Foreman, Ericsson Telephones Ltd.
- Charles Fitzearl, Carpenter, Merchant Navy.
- James Flanagan, Leading Storeman, No. 2 Maintenance Unit, Royal Air Force.
- Olive Flood, Electric Welder, James Day Sheet Metal Workers Ltd.
- George Forman, Skipper of a Motor Boat.
- William Godfrey Forster, Foreman, Inspection Board of United Kingdom, Ministry of Supply, Canada.
- Clarence John Fowler, Established Skilled Labourer, HM Dockyard, Portsmouth.
- Leonard John Francis, Chargehand Labourer, Ministry of Aircraft Production.
- Samuel Arthur Franklin, Foreman of Cable Works, Johnson & Phillips Ltd.
- Harry Norris Frater, Assistant Inspector of Postmen, Head Post Office, Whitby.
- Reginald Game, Motor Transport Supervisor, Admiralty.
- Benjamin Garnett, Supervisor of Steel Structures, Southern Railway Co., Brighton.
- Arthur James Gearing, MM, Head Observer, Royal Observer Corps.
- Frank Madins Geeson, Parcels Agent, London & North Eastern Railway Co., Liverpool Street Station.
- Edith May George, Assistant Manageress, Masons Laundry, Great Yarmouth.
- William Gill, Able Seaman, Merchant Navy.
- Alfred William Gittos, Donkeyman, Merchant Navy.
- Edward Horace Gooderson, Chief Machine Foreman, Great Western Railway Co., Swindon Works.
- John Edward Graham, Engine Driver, London & North Eastern Railway Co., York.
- Arthur William Gray, Chargeman of Labourers, Royal Navy Torpedo Depot, Portsmouth.
- Roy Clive Green, Works Superintendent, Blackburn Aircraft Co. Ltd.
- Arthur Greenwood, Cotton Weaver, James Cockroft & Sons.
- John Nue Griffin, Assembly Foreman, Metropolitan-Vickers Electrical Co. Ltd.
- Alfred Grimes, Tool Hardener, Joseph Thompson (Sheffield) Ltd.
- Minnie Doris Groombridge, Solderer, Telegraph Condenser Co. Ltd.
- George Victor Gudridge, Chief Steward, Merchant Navy.
- Lilias Guthrie, Firewoman, No. 34 (London) Area, National Fire Service.
- Maud Ethel Mary Gwilliam, Supervisor (Telegraphs), Head Post Office, Worcester.
- Albert James Hall, Foreman Boilermaker, J. Russell & Co.
- Robert Douglas Hall, Chargeman of Shipwrights, Humber Shipwright Co. Ltd.
- John William Snowden Hampshaw, Chief Inspector, Bradford City Police. For services to Civil Defence.
- Mark Harcombe, Lately Coal Miner, Llwyny Pia, No. 1 Colliery, Rhondda.
- Alexander Wilson Hardie, Precision Fitter, Barr & Stroud Ltd.
- Edward Ripon Hardy, Fireman, Merchant Navy.
- Albert Robert Harnden, Station Master, Southern Railway Co., Pluckley. For services to Civil Defence.
- Thomas Charles Harris, Hired Plumber, HM Dockyard, Portsmouth.
- Thomas Harrison, Chief Inspector, West Gas Improvement Co. Ltd.
- Thomas Gordon Campbell Harrop, Electrical Assistant, J. I. Thornycroft & Co. Ltd.
- John Harrott, Centre Lathe Operator, H. M. Hobsom (Aircraft & Motor) Components Ltd.
- James Valentine Hartnett, Foundry Superintendent, Ford Motor Co.
- Harry Arthur James Heal, Fitter, Joseph Lucas Ltd.
- Herbert Richard Heasman, Skilled Toolmaker, Arnott & Harrison Ltd.
- Robert Heaton, Armour Plate Fitter, Milners Safe Co. Ltd.
- John Kenneth Heeley, Machine Shop Foreman, J. Booth Bros Ltd.
- James Heggie, Boatswain, Merchant Navy.
- Hirian Emmett Hele, Foreman of Storehouses, HM Dockyard, Devonport.
- William Hemsley, Foreman-Smith, Ellistown Colliery.
- Alexander Henderson, Quartermaster, Merchant Navy.
- Charles Henry, Able Seaman, Merchant Navy.
- George Hitchings, Senior Overlooker, Royal Ordnance Factory, Ministry of Supply.
- Doris Audrey Hitchins, Grommet Net Maker, British Ropes Ltd.
- Thomas Hoare, Leading Fire Guard, Canterbury.
- George Hocking, Pumpman, Merchant Navy.
- William Hogarth, Foreman, Kirkpatrick & Barr Ltd.
- William Henry Hooper, Permanent Way Supervisor, Southern Railway Co., Tavistock.
- George Hope, D.F. Operator, Civil Aviation Department, Air Ministry.
- Harry Ullerthorne Hotham, Company Officer, No. 6 (Hull) Area, National Fire Service.
- George Nelson Hovells, Boatswain, Merchant Navy.
- John Howitt, Turner, Hunslet Engine Co. Ltd.
- Mabel Hughes, Senior Overlooker, Royal Ordnance Factory, Ministry of Supply.
- Gwilym Thomas Hughes, Aluminium Roller, Aluminium Corporation.
- Alexander Jackson, Office Keeper, Scottish Home Department.
- William Jameson, Fireman and Trimmer, Merchant Navy.
- Alfred Gladstone Jenkins, Inspector of Mechanics, Great Western Railway Co., Cardiff Docks.
- Bridget Jennings. For services to a Government Department.
- Agnes Estella Johnson, Fire Guard Officer, Gravesend.
- James Johnston, Working Foreman, Alex Findlay & Co.
- Mary Catherine Jones, Tobacco Worker, British-American Tobacco Co. Ltd.
- Mary Elizabeth Jones, Chargehand, British Nylon Spinners Ltd.
- Rosina Jones, Manageress, Navy, Army & Air Force Institutes.
- James Kelly, Head Foreman, L. Sterne & Co. Ltd.
- Reginald Stanley Kelly, Foreman, Henry Hughes & Son Ltd.
- John Kennaway, Sergeant, City of Glasgow Special Constabulary.
- George Nicholas Kennedy, Chief Examiner, Aeronautical Inspection Directorate, Ministry of Aircraft Production.
- John Kennedy, Foreman, R. S. Abbey Ltd.
- Patrick Kieran, Head Stevedore Foreman, A. Holt & Co.
- Leonard King, Mechanic, Mullard Radio Valve Co. Ltd.
- Harry Albert Kirk, Civilian Armament Instructor, Grade III, Flying Training Command, Royal Air Force.
- Robert James Kirk, Station Officer, HM Coastguard Service, Seahouses.
- William Henry Kirtley, Template and Mould Loft Foreman, Tees Side Bridge & Engineering Works Ltd.
- William John Knight, Sorting Clerk and Telegraphist, Woking.
- Ivy Knox, Superintendent, Civil Defence First Aid Post, Coleraine, Northern Ireland.
- Reginald Jackson Kynaston, Foreman, Hickson & Welch Ltd.
- James William Lane, Coal Miner, Brodsworth Main Colliery.
- Victor Ernest Lane, Inspector (Engineering), Telephone Manager's Office, Nottingham.
- Robert Langton, Lamptrimmer, Merchant Navy.
- David Lauder, Millwright, London & North Eastern Railway Co., Cowlairs Works.
- Arthur William Lawson, Skilled Fitter Foreman, International Alloys Ltd.
- Bertram Wood Lawson, Emergency Repair Overseer (Inspector of Engine Fitters), Admiralty.
- Lilian Maud Leadbeater, Component Examiner, Taylor, Taylor & Hobson Ltd.
- Catherine Leask, Manageress, Navy, Army & Air Force Institutes.
- Joseph Lee, Chief Baker, Merchant Navy.
- Percy Lee, Joiner, Royal Ordnance Factory, Ministry of Supply.
- William Alonzo Lee, Men's Welfare Officer, HM Dockyard, Devonport.
- William Henry Lee, Chargeman of Riggers, HM Dockyard, Rosyth.
- Ronald Henry Charles Lenthall, Foreman Waterman, Tough Bros Ltd.
- Dennis Liggins, Foreman, Armstrong Siddeley Motors Ltd.
- Robert Lindores, Assistant Head Messenger, Regional Director's Office, General Post Office, Edinburgh.
- Gerald Douglas Littlejohn, Foreman, Park Royal Coach Works Ltd.
- Samuel Lloyd, District Goods Inspector, Great Western Railway Co., Shrewsbury.
- William Lloyd, Carpenter, Merchant Navy.
- Thomas Lofting, Auto Shop Chargehand, Telephone Manufacturing Co. Ltd.
- William George Lovering, Tool Maker and Demonstrator, Bristol Aeroplane Co. Ltd.
- Lewis Lunn, Police Sergeant, Manchester Ship Canal Co.
- Alexander Lyall, Quartermaster, Merchant Navy.
- John Lynch, Foreman Stevedore, John Fry & Co. Ltd.
- Henry Lynn, Fireman, Merchant Navy.
- George William Mabe, Foundry Foreman, Harper Automatic Machine Co. Ltd.
- Donald McAnsh, Skipper of a Motor Boat.
- Francis Charles Joseph McCann, Assistant Foreman of Factory, Royal Naval Armament Depot, Haifa.
- William McClafferty, Greaser, Merchant Navy.
- Brinley Philip MacDonald, Chief Dock Foreman, Swansea Docks.
- Malcolm MacDonald, Constable, City of Glasgow Police Force.
- Alexander McGibney, Dairyman, Wigtownshire.
- James Wilson MacGill, Foreman Riveter, Cochrane & Sons Ltd.
- Mary McHale, Works Supervisor, Littlewoods Mail Order Stores Ltd.
- John McInnes, Assistant Foreman Carpenter, Barclay, Curie & Co.
- Sadie McKendra, Chargewoman Concrete Worker, Ministry of War Transport.
- Edward McLean, Able Seaman, Merchant Navy.
- Donald MacLeod, Lieutenant, Dunbarton Police Service and Air Raid Precautions Training Officer, Dunbarton County.
- Constance Maillard, Centre Organiser, Penarth Urban District, Women's Voluntary Services for Civil Defence.
- John Main, Skipper of a Motor Boat.
- William George Edward Mallett, Sergeant, Nottingham Police Force. For services for Civil Defence.
- George Thomas Mansell, Foreman, Walton Yacht Works Ltd.
- George Robert Albert Campbell Mansfield, Ammunition Foreman, Experimental Establishment, Ministry of Supply.
- Harold Francis William Markham, Carpenter, Merchant Navy.
- Irene Marriott, Centre Organiser, Llwchwr Urban District, Women's Voluntary Services for Civil Defence.
- George Marsh, Head Foreman, Rea Ltd.
- Michael Martin, Able Seaman and Lamptrimmer, Merchant Navy.
- Robert Golding Maulkinson, Fitter, Amos & Smith Ltd.
- Hugh Maunder, Foreman, Armament Inspection Department, Ministry of Supply.
- George Alexander Mecham. For services to Government Departments.
- Charles George Miles, Foreman, Herbert Woods Ltd.
- Patrick Miller, Chief Steward, Merchant Navy.
- Samuel Richard Miller, Engine Room Storekeeper, Merchant Navy.
- William Spence Milne, Second Engineman of a Steam Trawler.
- Thomas David Phillip Mobsey, Technical Assistant, Inspectorate of Electrical & Mechanical Equipment, Ministry of Supply.
- Mohamed Ali, Deck Serang, Merchant Navy.
- William James Moon, Leading Man of Wharf, HM Dockyard, Malta.
- Harold Moore, Boatswain, Merchant Navy.
- William Howells Morgan, Foreman, Wm. Still & Sons Ltd.
- James Ernest Morris, Chief Traffic Inspector, Great Western Railway Co., Newport Division.
- Lawrence Morrissey, Electrician, Campbell & Isherwood.
- William Moses, Chargeman Fitter, Silley Cox & Co. Ltd.
- Harold James Mossman, Works Manager, Harley Aircraft Landing Lamps Co.
- John William Moyse, Donkeyman, Merchant Navy.
- Helen Munday, Manageress, Civil Defence Casualty Depot Canteen, Westminster.
- Mohamed Musla, Donkeyman, Merchant Navy.
- Bertha Musselwhite, Matron, British Power Boat Co. Ltd.
- Michael Neafsey, Superintending Foreman, Manchester Ship Canal Co.
- John William Neal, Assistant Overseer (Grade I) to the Royal Naval Flag Officer-in-Charge, London.
- Frederick Neath, Welfare Officer, Bristol Aeroplane Co. Ltd.
- Alexander Nelson, Boatswain, Merchant Navy.
- William Norman Stanley Newton, Chief Examiner, Aeronautical Inspection Directorate, Ministry of Aircraft Production.
- Frederick Alfred Nicholas, Inspector of Riggers, HM Dockyard, Alexandria.
- Lewis Nicholas, Chargeman (Established Skilled Labourer), Admiralty Outstation.
- Thomas Nobes, Storeman, No. 3 Maintenance Unit, Royal Air Force.
- Jack Motts Norris, Automatic Gun Fitter, Vickers-Armstrongs Ltd.
- Maurice Glaud Northover, Assembly & Wiring Shop Foreman, Parmeko Ltd.
- Harry Nunn, Yard Inspector, London & North Eastern Railway Co., Holloway. For services to Civil Defence.
- Wilfred Henry Oakley, Leading Fireman, No. 36 (London) Area, National Fire Service.
- Peter O'Donnell, Foreman Electrician, Furness Shipbuilding Co. Ltd.
- Arthur Edward Ody, Mill Operator, Westinghouse Brake & Signal Co. Ltd.
- Oosmanba Dadaba, Deck Serang, Merchant Navy.
- Frederick Orton, Senior Diver, Mersey Docks & Harbour Board.
- Herbert Orton, Postman, Head Post Office, Blackpool.
- William John Oswick, Inspector of Engine Fitters, HM Dockyard, Chatham.
- Samuel John Owen, Chief Fitting and Machine Shop Foreman, Great Western Railway Co., Swindon.
- Michael Owens, Able Seaman, Merchant Navy.
- Bessie Packham, Ambulance Attendant, Borough Ambulance Service, Barking. For services to Civil Defence.
- George Palmer, Fireman, Merchant Navy.
- Thomas Palmer, Jigmaker, Crittall Manufacturing Co. Ltd.
- Charles Thomas Pankhurst, Principal Foreman, Ministry of Aircraft Production.
- Sidney Parkin, Deputy Head Warden, Civil Defence Wardens Service, Hull.
- Edward Parkinson, Working Foreman, Alex Findlay & Co.
- Charles Parry, Boatswain, Merchant Navy.
- Stanley Harcourt Partridge, Divisional Warden, Civil Defence Wardens Service, Leicestershire.
- Allen Pasquil, Shotfirer's Assistant, Howe Bridge Colliery.
- Charles William Patterson, Carpenter, Merchant Navy.
- Robert Peacock, Foreman, Vickers-Armstrongs Ltd.
- James Pemberton, Chief Goods Foreman, London, Midland & Scottish Railway Co., Alexandra Dock, Liverpool.
- Donald James Pengelly, Foreman of Storehouses, Admiralty Outstation.
- Francis Gene Penna, Storekeeper, Merchant Navy.
- Alfred Penney, Greaser, Merchant Navy.
- Frederick Norman Percival, Tool Room Foreman, Gaskell & Chambers Ltd.
- James Robert Perkins, Station Engineer, Royal Air Force Station, Deversoir, Egypt.
- George Courtney Petherick, Senior Artificer, Royal Naval Mine Design Department, Havant.
- Jesse Pettiat, Instructor, Newcastle upon Tyne Wing, Air Training Corps.
- Christopher Fowler Phillips, Head of Erection Department, Elliott Bros (London) Ltd.
- Emrys Phillips, Foreman, Central Electricity Board.
- Leonard Phillips, Chargehand, Kelvin, Bottomley & Baird Ltd.
- Henry Benjamin Pickett, Inspector, Supermarine Works, Vickers-Armstrongs Ltd.
- Marjorie Elsie Pillow, Ambulance Driver, Civil Defence Ambulance Service, Birmingham.
- Frederick Arthur Pinch, Assistant Overseer, Grade I, to the Admiralty Engineer Overseer, Sheffield and Leeds District.
- John Grieve Porter, Engineer Foreman, L.B.S. Engineering Co. Ltd.
- John Francis Porteus, Engine Driver, Great Western Railway Co., Old Oak Common.
- James Power, Boatswain, Merchant Navy.
- John Power, Outside Engineering Foreman, Cammell Laird & Co. Ltd.
- William Pratt, Progress Manager, John Lang & Sons Ltd.
- Francis George Prince, Foreman, Adjuster and Outside Erector, Barr & Stroud Ltd.
- Anne Unity Purkiss, Foster Parent to Evacuee Children, Ingatestone.
- Ernest George Randall, Emergency Repair Overseer, (Inspector of Engine Fitters), Admiralty.
- Mark Gentry Raven, Chief Baker, Merchant Navy.
- Richard Walter John Redman, Chief Steward, Merchant Navy.
- Arthur Charles Redstone, Assistant Superintendent, (Postal), South Western Region Training Centre, Taunton.
- George Martin Reed, Chief Permanent Way Adviser, London & North Eastern Railway Co., London.
- Harold John Reeve, Assistant Inspecting Officer, Naval Store Department, Dover.
- John Reid, Carpenter, Merchant Navy.
- William Reid, Head Foreman Shipwright, Fairfield Shipbuilding & Engineering Co. Ltd.
- Frank Renshaw, Signal Locking Fitter, London, Midland & Scottish Railway Co., Rugby.
- Urias Edmund Richards, Foreman Blacksmith, C. H. Bailey Ltd.
- William Edgar Richardson, Foreman, Synchronome Co. Ltd.
- Edward George Ridgeway, Machine Shop Foreman, Joseph Lucas Ltd.
- Frederick William Rigby, Fitter-in-Charge, Mersey Docks & Harbour Board.
- Bert George Rivett, Foreman, Laurence, Scott & Electromotors Ltd.
- Cyril Roberts, Senior Foreman, Imperial Chemical Industries (Metals) Ltd.
- George Arthur Roberts, Leading Fireman, No. 37 (London) Area, National Fire Service.
- Duncan Robertson, Boatswain, Merchant Navy.
- William Robertson, Boatswain, Merchant Navy.
- John Rocks, Coal Miner, Tannochside.
- Richard James Rodham, Chargeman Fitter, Swan Hunter & Wigham Richardson Ltd.
- Robert Humphrey Roe, Able Seaman, Merchant Navy.
- Francis Rooney, Assistant Steward, Merchant Navy.
- Henry Roscoe, Chief Toolmaker, Lang Pen Co. Ltd.
- Joseph Rowe, Confirmed Leading Man, HM Dockyard, Devonport.
- James John Sullivan-Russell, Fireman, London, Midland & Scottish Railway Co.
- Charles Thomas Rutter, Assistant Foreman, Royal Ordnance Factory, Ministry of Supply.
- George Savage, Engine-room Leading Hand, Merchant Navy.
- Arthur George Saxton, Assistant Overseer, Grade I, to the Admiralty Engineer Overseer, Southampton.
- Eric Richardson Scarneld, Bodymaker, Grade I, Southern Railway Co., Lancing.
- William Robert Scoggins, Class "B" Observer, Royal Observer Corps.
- William Scott, Working Foreman, Alex Findlay & Co.
- Cyril James Shannon, Clerk of Works, Works Department, Air Ministry.
- Thomas Sheppard, Foreman Plumber, R. & H. Green & Silley Weir Ltd.
- Frederick James Sherwood, Chargeman of Shipfitters, Admiralty Outstation.
- John Shields, Working Foreman, Alex Findlay & Co.
- John Rawlings Shipley, Foreman Shipwright, Middle Docks & Engineering Co. Ltd.
- Jeannie Short, Stewardess, Merchant Navy.
- Florence Sillence, Matron, St. Margaret's Day Nursery, Cowfold, Sussex.
- Jesse James Simpson, Boilermaker, HM Dockyard, Chatham.
- Percival Sinn, Boiler House and Power House Fitter, Betteshanger Colliery.
- Joseph Slaney, Mechanic, Fighting Vehicles Proving Establishment, Ministry of Supply.
- Arthur Edward Smith, Shop Foreman, No. 9 Maintenance Unit, Royal Air Force.
- Henry James Smith, Examiner, Imperial Chemical Industries (Metals) Ltd.
- Hilda Smith, Member of Joint Production Committee, Cosmos Manufacturing Co. Ltd.
- John William Smith, Foreman of Laboratory, Royal Naval Armament Depot, Bull Point.
- Margaret Smith, Supervisor, Emergency Rest Centre Service, Portsmouth.
- Tom Parker Smith, Pattern Shop Foreman, Morris Motors Ltd.
- William David Smith, Storeholder "A", Field Stores, War Office, Aldershot.
- Charles Arthur Soar, Foreman, Southern Railway Co., Eastleigh.
- Sow Hung King, Chief Cook, Merchant Navy.
- Francis Henry Spencer, Laboratory Mechanic, Admiralty Signal Establishment, Haslemere.
- Fred Stacey, Leading Fitter, Markham & Co.
- Cyrus Stanistreet, Deck Storekeeper, Merchant Navy.
- George Edwin Stanley, Carpenter, Merchant Navy.
- Hugh David Stannard, Chargehand, Research Laboratories, General Electric Co.
- Victor Frederick Stannard, Quartermaster, Merchant Navy.
- Harry Stanton, Chief Steward, Merchant Navy.
- Isaac Stokes, Fitting Shop Foreman, Mountstuart Dry Docks Ltd.
- Frederick Stonier, Sergeant, Wolverhampton Police Force. For services to Civil Defence.
- Reginald William Stubbington, Chief of Test Department, E. N. Bray Ltd.
- Subdul X. Chambroo, Chief Cook and Baker, Merchant Navy.
- Lilian Summerhayes, Chargehand, British Parachute Co. Ltd.
- William Whitford Surtees, Fitter, Whitehead Torpedo Co. Ltd.
- Thomas William Sutherland, First Class Engineer, Admiralty Yard Craft Lyness.
- Joseph Swannack, Chief Inspector, Marshall Sons & Co. (Successors) Ltd.
- Edward Ethelbert Taylor, Leading Draughtsman, Central Workshops, Royal Electrical & Mechanical Engineers, War Office.
- William Edward Taylor, Inspector (Engineering), York Telephone Area, Hull.
- William Henry Taylor, Mains Foreman, British Gaslight Co.
- Joseph David Henry Tee, Brushmaker, John Palmer Ltd.
- Isabella Telfer, Incorporator Worker, Imperial Chemical Industries Ltd.
- Lydia Thomas, Inspector, Elexcel Ltd.
- Willis Thomas, Scissors Assembler, Wostenholm & Son Ltd.
- Francis Alexander Thomassin, Kinematograph Engineering Co. Ltd.
- William Thompson, Donkeyman, Merchant Navy.
- George Wilks Thomson, Foreman, Admiralty Outstation.
- John Thomson, Inspector, Luton Police Force, and Staff Officer for Civil Defence to Air Raid Precautions Controller, Luton.
- Thomas William Tideswell, Telephone Mechanic, Post Office Factory, Birmingham.
- Margaret Tolly, Diecaster, Birmingham Aluminium Castings (1903) Ltd.
- Rex Tomkinson, General Foreman, Goodyear Tyre & Rubber Co.
- James Treadgold, Chargehand (Grade I), Admiralty.
- John Charles Tree, Assistant Works Manager, British Ropes Ltd.
- William Henry Tucker, Assistant Overseer, Grade I, to the Admiralty Engineer Overseer, Barrow District.
- James Tynemouth, Inspector, Newcastle upon Tyne and Gateshead Gas Co.
- Ernest Alfred Tyrrell, Berthing Master, Grade II, London & North Eastern Railway Co., Lowestoft Harbour. For services to Civil Defence.
- George Urwin, Principal Foreman of Stores, No. 14 Maintenance Unit, Royal Air Force.
- Ernest Henry Veale, Inspector of Engine Fitters to the Admiralty Engineer Overseer, Wallsend-on-Tyne.
- Joseph Robert Waite, Police, Inspector, London & North Eastern Railway Co., Hull. For services to Civil Defence.
- Sarah Wallace, Centre Organiser, Boldon Colliery Branch, Women's Voluntary Services for Civil Defence.
- Jack Leslie Yates Walmsley, Plotter, Civil Defence Report & Control Centre, Portsmouth.
- James Walmsley, Inspector of Telephones, HM Dockyard, Rosyth.
- Alexander Walton, Boatswain, Merchant Navy.
- George Albert Ward, Foreman, H. W. Ward & Co. Ltd.
- Frederick William Warwick, Senior Foreman, Thos Firth & John Brown Ltd.
- Arthur Ernest Waters, Superintendent of Stevedores, Avonmouth & Portishead Docks.
- George Watkins, Chief Steward, Merchant Navy.
- Reginald George Watling, Foreman in charge, Admiralty Department, R. B. Pullin & Co.
- Reginald William Watts, Chargehand (Grade I), Admiralty Outstation.
- Jack Wellings, Shackle Smith, T. B. Wellings Ltd.
- Dudley George Wheeler, Foreman, Bovis Ltd.
- Edna Enid Whitton, Civilian Masseuse, Royal Air Force Medical Rehabilitation Unit, Loughborough.
- Phoebe Wilcox, Toolsetter, E. W. Bliss (England) Ltd.
- Maggie Wild, Assistant Supervisor, Class I, (Telephones), Head Post Office, Rochdale.
- Frank Athole Wilkinson, Shop Foreman, Forward Radiator Co. Ltd.
- William Wilkinson, Foreman, A. V. Roe & Co. Ltd.
- Charles Williams, Production Foreman, Imperial Chemical Industries General Chemicals Ltd.
- Charles Edward Wilshere, Aircraft Woodworker, Royal Aircraft Establishment.
- John Wilson, Head Outside Engineer Foreman, Lobnitz & Co. Ltd.
- Stanley Ernest Winckworth, Inspector (Engineering), Telephone Manager's Office, Bristol.
- James Wishart, Boatswain, Merchant Navy.
- Wong Song Ling, Fireman, Merchant Navy.
- Leslie Harold Woodings, Foreman, Steatite & Porcelain Products Ltd.
- Rose Woodman, Grommet Net Maker, British Ropes Ltd.
- William Edward Woods, Chief Cook, Merchant Navy.
- William Henry Wooley, Airway Repairer, Hilton Main Colliery.
- Gilbert Bertram Woollard, Superintendent of Works, Sharpness Docks.
- Ebenezer Worsley, Chief Foreman, Southern Railway Co., Brighton Locomotive Works.
- Frank Worth, Assistant Steward, Merchant Navy.
- Samuel Wright, Shot Firer, Birch Coppice Colliery.
- Harry Wykes, Foreman, Marshall's Flying School Ltd.
- Leonard Yates, Chargehand Miller, Coventry Climax Engines Ltd.
- Elsie May Young, Power Press Operator-setter, Paton, Calvert & Co. Ltd.
- John Cypless Young, Deputy Chief Warden, Civil Defence Wardens Service, Bedford.

=== India ===
- Zakahie Angami, Interpreter, Naga Hills, Assam.
- Jinendra Nath Bhattacharji, Foreman, Inspectorate of Ammunition, Kirkee.
- Mangesh Vithal Divekar, Range Forest Officer, Nagargali Range, Belgaum Division, Bombay.
- Andrew Alloysius Ferns, Teacher, St. Francis High School, Lucknow, United Provinces.
- Arthur Hollands, Tool Room Foreman, Kanchrapara, Bengal & Assam Railway.
- Muhammad Hussain, Head Clerk, Ordnance Inspection Depot, Rawalpindi.
- Colin Macfarlane, Station Master, Ranchi.
- Sri Madhathil Ramunni Marar, Sheristadar, District Court, Tellicherry, Malabar District, Madras.
- Lakshman Krishnaji Patil, Ranger, Forest Department, Central Provinces & Berar.
- Poppy Adeline Ricker, Superintendent, Calcutta Telephone Exchange.
- Param Hans Singh, Tahsildar, Bansgaon Gorakhpur District, United Provinces.

=== Colonies, Protectorates, Etc. ===
- Savenaca Veikoso, Native Medical Practitioner, Fiji.
- Isaac Nathaniel Davies, First Grade Fitter and Motor Mechanic, Marine Department, Gambia.
- Charles Attard, Engine Driver, Electricity Branch, Water, Electricity & Telephones Department, Malta.
- Andrew Buhagiar, Foreman, Telephones Branch, Water, Electricity & Telephones Department, Malta.
- Nicholas Busuttil, Inspector of Workshops, Electricity Branch, Water, Electricity & Telephones Department, Malta.
- Lawrence Farrugia, Protection Officer, Cotonera Area, Malta.
- Anthony Gordon, Foreman and Wireman, Broadcast Relay Service (Malta) Ltd., Malta.
- Amabile Grech, Inspector of Machinery, Water Branch, Water, Electricity & Telephones Department, Malta.
- Sherif Keenan Kittaneh, Postmaster, Nablus, Palestine.
- Tewfik Seraphim, Chief Clerk, Grade M, District Commissioner's Office, Galilee, Palestine.
- Simon Susman, Senior Foreman (Locomotive) Grade "L", Palestine Railways.
- Adan Ismail, Somali Instructor, Medical Department, Somaliland.
- Burraleh Robleh, Lately Inspector, Somaliland Police.
- Avizull Mohammed, Civilian Employee, Motor Transport Section, Piarco, Trinidad.
- Bambu, District Headman, Vella Lavella, Western Pacific.
