= SNCC (disambiguation) =

SNCC may refer to:

- Ernulf Academy, formerly known as St Neots Community College (SNCC), an educational establishment in England
- Société nationale des Chemins de fer du Congo, national railway company in Congo
- Student Nonviolent Coordinating Committee, a human rights group in the United States
