= Paxton Pits Nature Reserve =

Local nature reserve in Cambridgeshire, England

Coordinates: 52.2542°N 0.2483°W

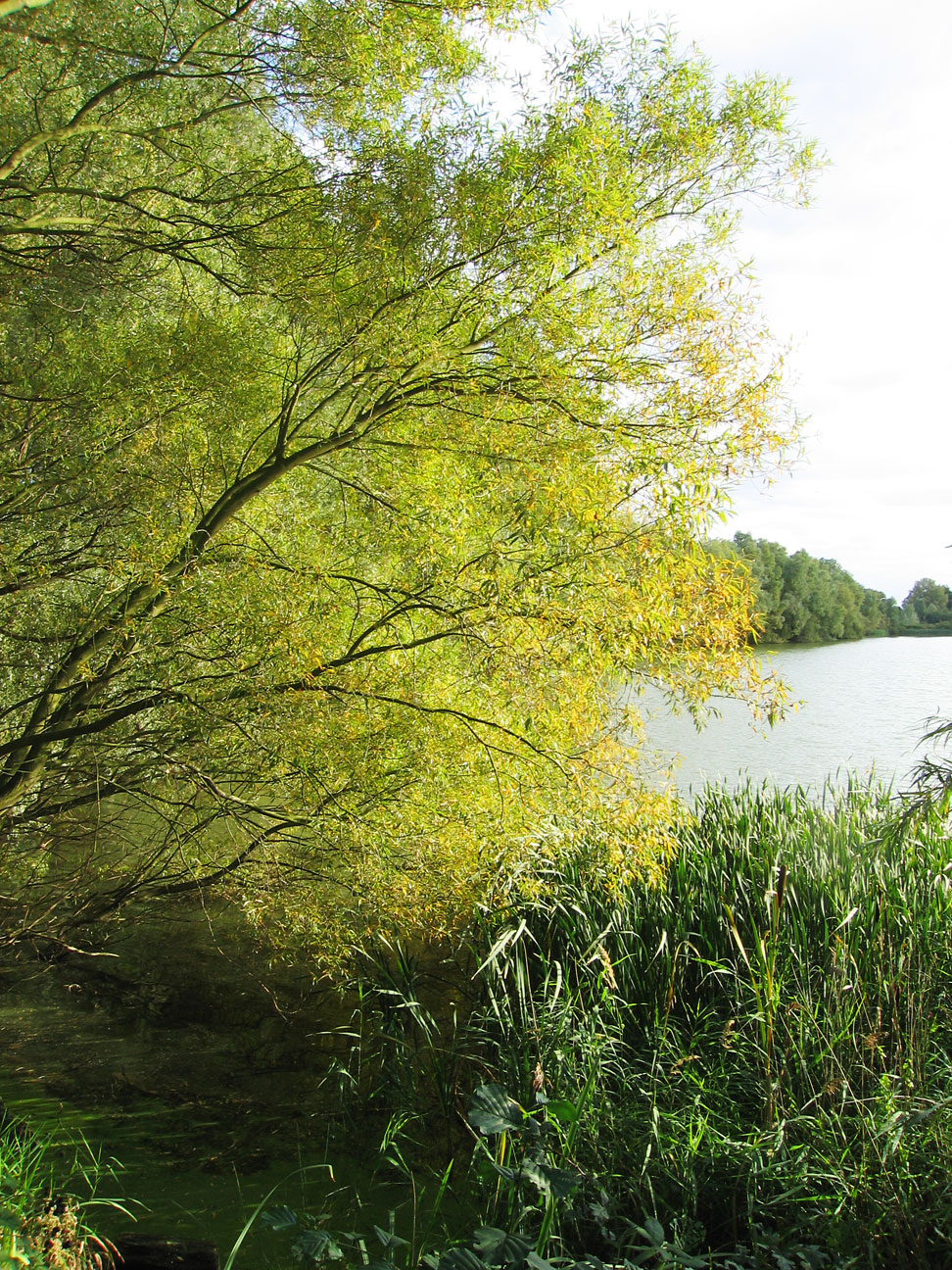
The corner of one of the ponds at Paxton Pits Nature Reserve

Paxton Pits is an area of active and disused gravel pits at Little Paxton in Cambridgeshire, England. The pits are in the valley of the River Great Ouse.

The disused pits have been turned into a nature reserve with 77 hectares (190 acres) of lakes, meadow, grassland, scrub and woodland. The reserve is famous for its nightingales and cormorants and is home to a wide variety of other birds, insects, mammals and flora.

There are two marked self-guided walking routes around the reserve, together with the River Trail that follows the route of the Ouse Valley Way.

The circular 2-mile (3.2 km) Heron Trail (the first mile of which is a hard-surfaced track suitable for wheelchairs, pushchairs and all-season walking) goes past lakes, through woodland and along the river bank, and which has three bird hides to view the water birds.

The circular 1.5-mile (2.4 km) Meadow Trail goes through meadows and around lakes and is especially good for wildflowers in spring and summer and dragonflies on sunny days, although some of the paths become quite muddy in winter and during wet weather.

The reserve has free parking at the visitor and education centre, with a café and toilets.
