= Harley Aircraft Landing Lamps =

A type of aircraft lamp

Harley Aircraft Landing Lamps was an aircraft landing light company based near St Neots in Cambridgeshire. Their products were fitted to British aircraft between World War II and the 1960s.

== Structure ==
It was based at Paxton Hill on what is now the B1043 in Great Paxton, south of the village and north of St Neots.

Toseland Hall, home of the owner Maldon Harley

== History ==
The company was founded at Heston Aerodrome in Middlesex.

Maldon Harley, an electrical engineer and pilot, moved to Huntingdonshire in 1938 and lived at Toseland Hall. He designed his first landing light in 1930. He died on 28 March 1966 at the age of 59.

It became part of Plessey Dynamics Group around 1966.

== Products ==
The Harley Lamp became the name of a type of aircraft lamp, also known as the Harley system, with a diffuse spread of light. Previous aircraft landing lamp types (conical beam) had a more hard-edged, glaring beam of light, which although provided plenty of light, was not conducive for a pilot's night-vision. A fluted lens was fitted behind the upper half of the lamp's glass, which directed diffuse light through the beam of light from the lower half of the lamp, to give a graduated area of light around the main beam.

Lights for the interior of airliners were also developed in the late 1940s.
