= Ernulf Academy =

Location
- Barford Road; St Neots, Cambridgeshire, PE19 2SH; England
- Coordinates: 52°12′56″N 0°16′13″W

Information
- Type: Academy
- Motto: Inspiring Beyond Measure
- Local authority: Cambridgeshire
- Department for Education URN: 146369 Tables
- Ofsted: Reports
- Principal: Thomas Fisher
- Gender: Co-Educational
- Age: 11 to 16
- Enrolment: 508
- Colours: Dark Blue, Dark Red, Grey
- Website: astreaernulf.org

Ernulf Academy is a secondary school with academy status, located in St Neots, Cambridgeshire, England. It is one of two St Neots secondary schools that are part of the Astrea Academy Trust, with Longsands Academy being the other.

== About ==
When Ernulf Academy was first opened, it was originally named 'Ernulf Community School', but was later changed to 'Ernulf Community College'. In 2004, the school gained Specialist School status, and changed its name again to 'St. Neots Community College'. Then, on 1 September, the college relaunched with its new name. Its specialist subjects were Drama, Media, and Music, which together with Art, form the performing arts group. The school became Cambridgeshire's first 11–18 Specialist Performing Arts College. In May 2009, the school was put under special measures, but as of March 2011 they were classed by Ofsted as a "satisfactory school with good and outstanding features". The school was partnered with Longsands Academy as part of the 'St Neots Learning Partnership', and following a consultation, the school became an academy from 1 September 2011 and was renamed Ernulf Academy.

== Sixth Form ==
In June 2015, Ernulf Academy announced that it would be temporarily closing its Sixth Form at the end of the school year. In September, a combined St Neots Sixth Form Centre, for both Ernulf and Longsands students, was opened in place of the Longsands Sixth Form building. In September 2018, the St Neots Sixth Form Centre was renamed Astrea Sixth Form St Neots after the St Neots Learning Partnership was merged with Astrea Academy Trust.
