= Longsands Academy =

Coordinates: 52°13′53.21″N 0°15′26.52″W

Location
- Longsands Road; St Neots, Cambridgeshire, PE19 1LQ; England

Information
- Type: Academy
- Established: September 1960
- Department for Education URN: 136992 Tables
- Ofsted: Reports
- Acting headteacher: Francis Bray
- Gender: Co-Educational
- Age: 11 to 18
- Enrolment: 1688
- Houses: Hawking, Austen, Darwin, Seacole, Turing
- Website: www.astrea-longsands.org

Longsands Academy is a co-educational secondary school and sixth form with academy status, in the town of St. Neots, Cambridgeshire, England. With Ernulf Academy, it is one of the only two secondary schools in St Neots that are part of the Astrea Academy Trust.

== History ==
Longsands Academy was opened in September 1960 as Longsands School, a secondary modern, under headmaster Harold K Whiting and headmistress Miss K C Flowerdew. The school's four houses were Rutherford (after Physicist Ernest Rutherford), Britten (after composer Benjamin Britten), Eliot (after poet Thomas Stearns Eliot) and Moore (after sculptor Henry Moore).

When opened the school had four years. The 1st year was streamed into 1E, 1A, 1S, and 1T, 2nd year 2N, 2O, 2R, 2T and 2H, 3rd year 3S, 3O, 3U, 3T, 3H and 4th year 4W, 4E, 4S, 4T. The use of the letters of the cardinal points of the compass was a way of partially disguising which classes were streamed the highest. The 5th year was started in 1961 for those pupils staying on beyond school leaving age (then 15) who were taking the GCE at O level.

Subsequently, Longsands became a comprehensive school with a sixth form, and was expanded. It was known as Longsands Community College until the late 1990s before being shortened to Longsands College. In August 2011 Longsands College was renamed to Longsands Academy, as Longsands became an academy.

In 2018, Longsands Academy became part of the Astrea Academy Trust. The school received a "Requires Improvement" grading from Ofsted in 2019. It was inspected again in 2024, and judged Good; As of 2025, this is the school's most recent inspection.

== Features ==
The academy accommodates students between the age of 11 and 18. The upper two years are part of the Sixth Form, which is based in a separate self-contained block on site, with lessons being done in the main school.

The school facilities include a sports hall, two gyms, a library, a stage for theatrical productions, an enclosed courtyard, and a large outdoor area including cricket strip and two rugby pitches, as well as a football pitch, long jump pit and all weather floodlit football/hockey pitch.

The school once had a museum located within the building, which closed in 1989 following the death of teacher Granville Rudd, who taught archaeology and museum studies with many of the contents (including an impressive collection of human skulls) later being transferred to St Neots town museum. The old museum room was used primarily as a classroom until 2003 when it was converted into two classrooms with remaining artefacts being donated to other museums.

Media Lab The Media Lab was opened in December 2005, some six months after designation of Specialist Status as an Academy with a specialism in Media. Originally a boiler room, it now houses a video editing suite, radio studio facility. The suite is used by other schools in the local community.

== Horizon ==
The school is part of an international society, the Horizon Association. It was set up in 1992, and aims to get pupils and staff from the participating schools to work together. As of 2016, there are eleven schools involved from eight countries.

== Notable former pupils ==
- Robbie Grabarz, high jumper
