= Miniature park =

Model village; miniature building models

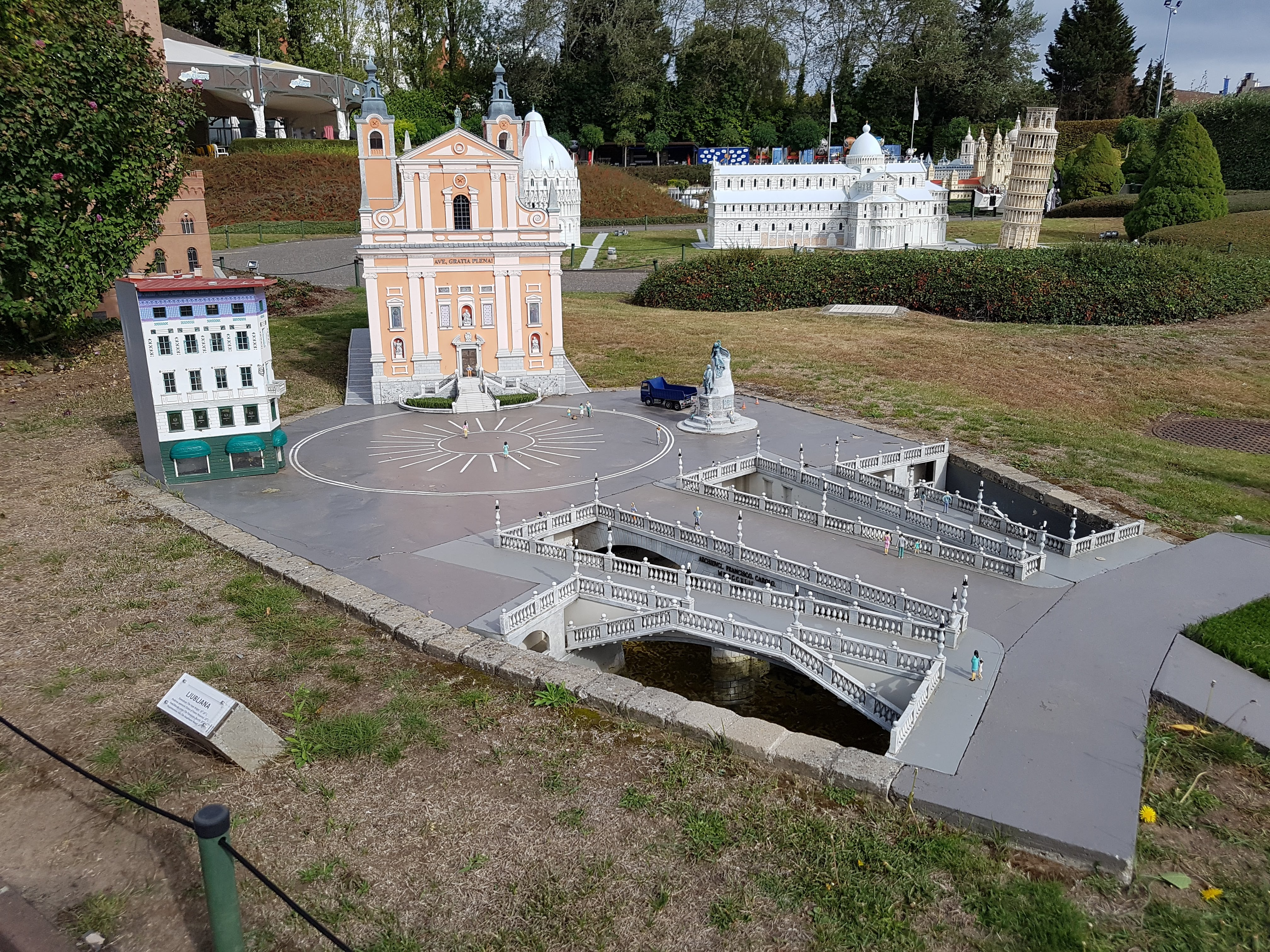
Park Mini-Europe in Brussels, Belgium

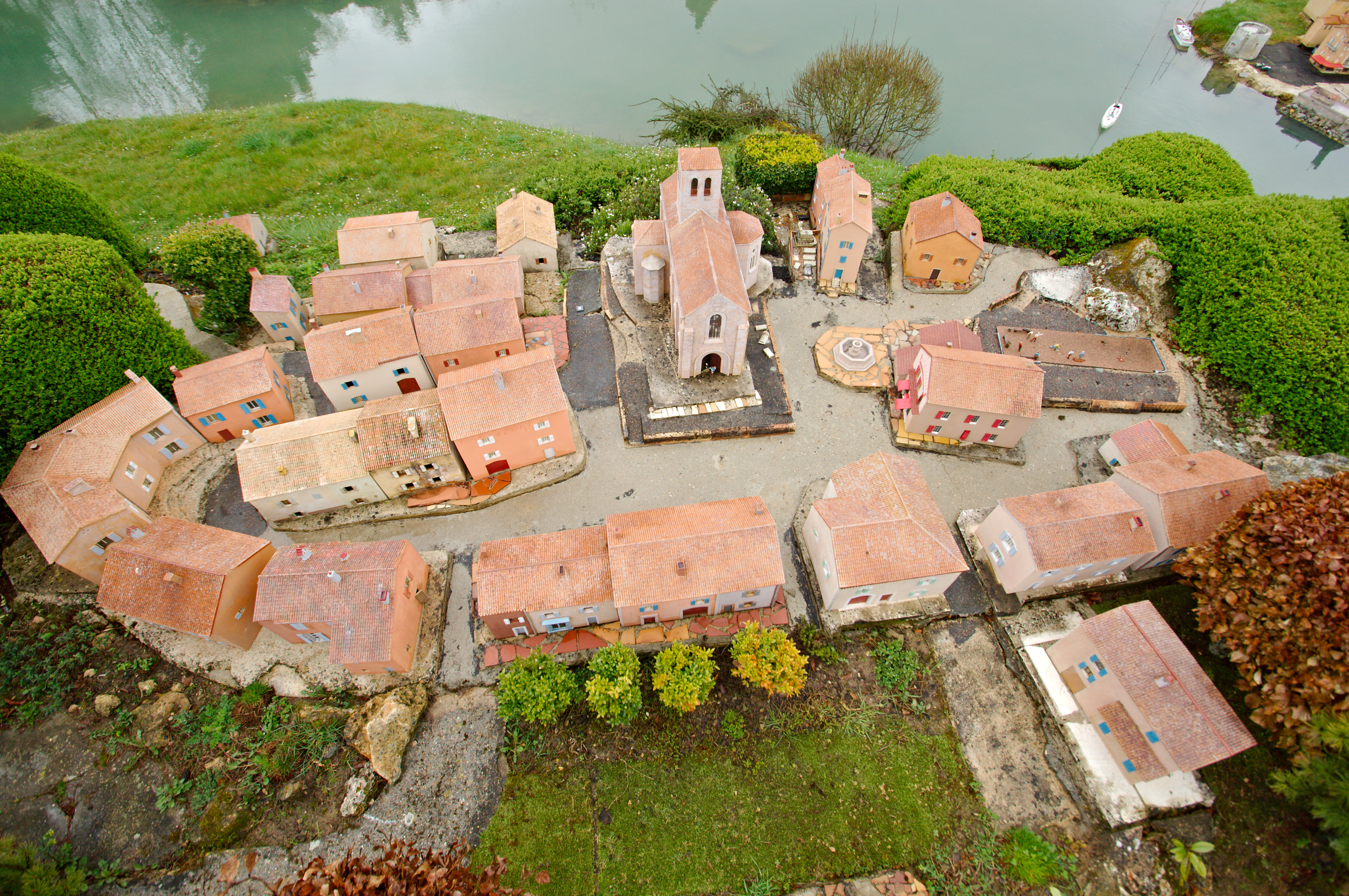
Model of a Provençal village in France Miniature, Élancourt, France

A miniature park is a display of miniature buildings and models, usually as a recreational and tourist attraction open to the public. A miniature park may contain a model of a single city or town, often called a miniature city or model village, or it can contain a number of different sets of models.

== History ==
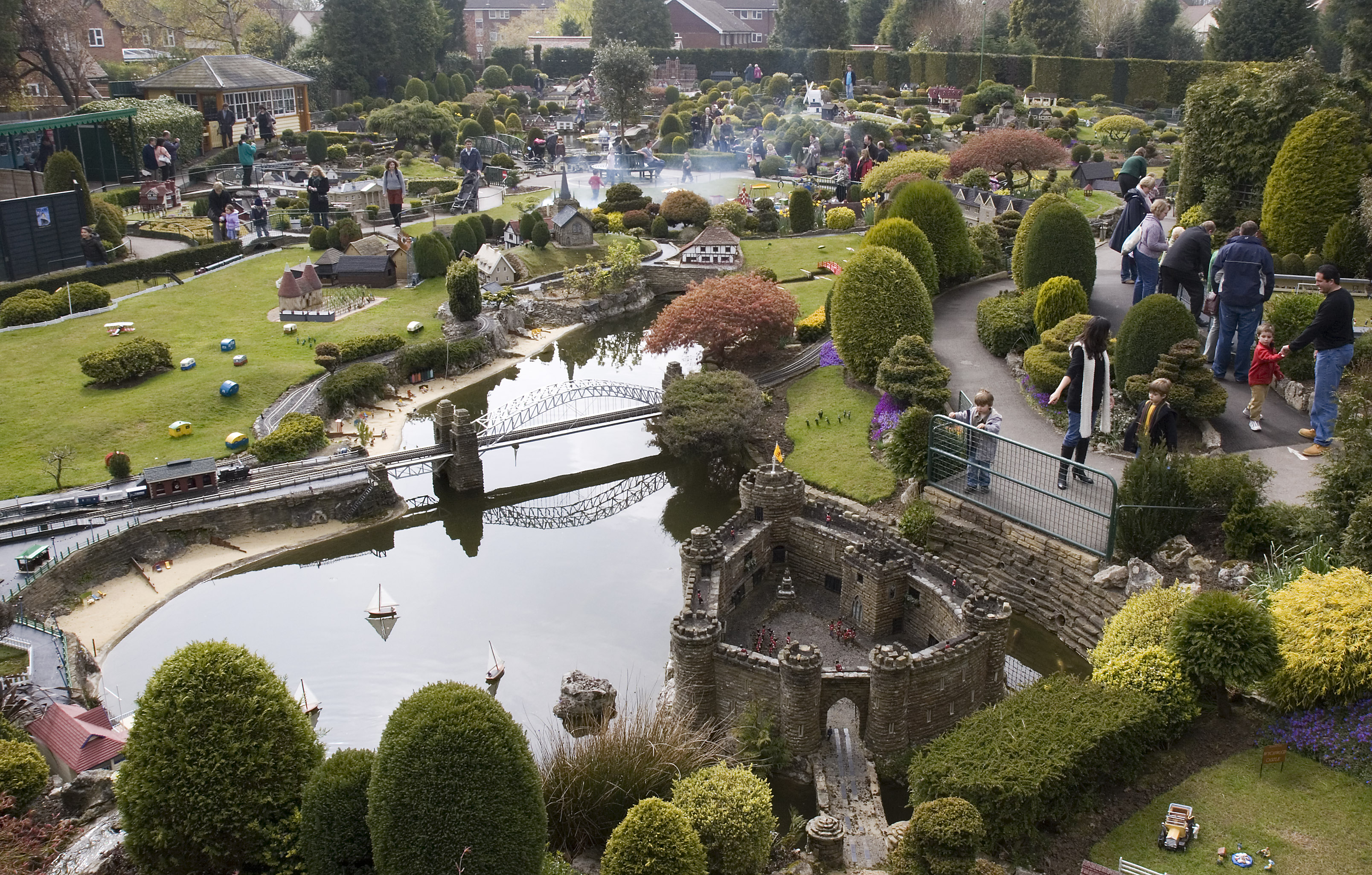
Bekonscot, in England, was one of the first model villages to become a tourist attraction

While working as a junior architect on the Hampstead Garden Suburb in 1907, Charles Paget Wade created a model village, named 'Fladbury' in the rear garden of his lodgings.. It was later relocated to Snowshill Manor, his house in Gloucestershire, where, after falling into disrepair for some years, it can be visited, renamed to 'Wolf's Cove'. There is evidence to suggest the existence of private model villages and miniature parks since the 19th century, but it was only in the 1930s to 1950s that the genre became tourist attractions. Early examples include Bekonscot and Bourton-on-the-Water in the UK and Madurodam in The Hague.

== Variations on a theme ==
Most model villages and parks are built to a consistent scale; varying from 1:76 as used by the intricately detailed Pendon in England up to the 1:9 scale of Wimborne Model Town.

There has been a move away from the model village concept since the mid- to late 20th century towards a miniature park concept. Model villages are typically larger-scale, sit in a cohesive miniature landscape and allow viewing and physical interaction with the exhibits, such as publicly accessed streets and urban areas. Miniature parks however, are primarily concerned with the display of exhibits in their own right, viewed from a distance. Model railways, rivers and roads may provide a continuation between miniature parks exhibits.

== List of notable miniature parks ==
=== Europe ===
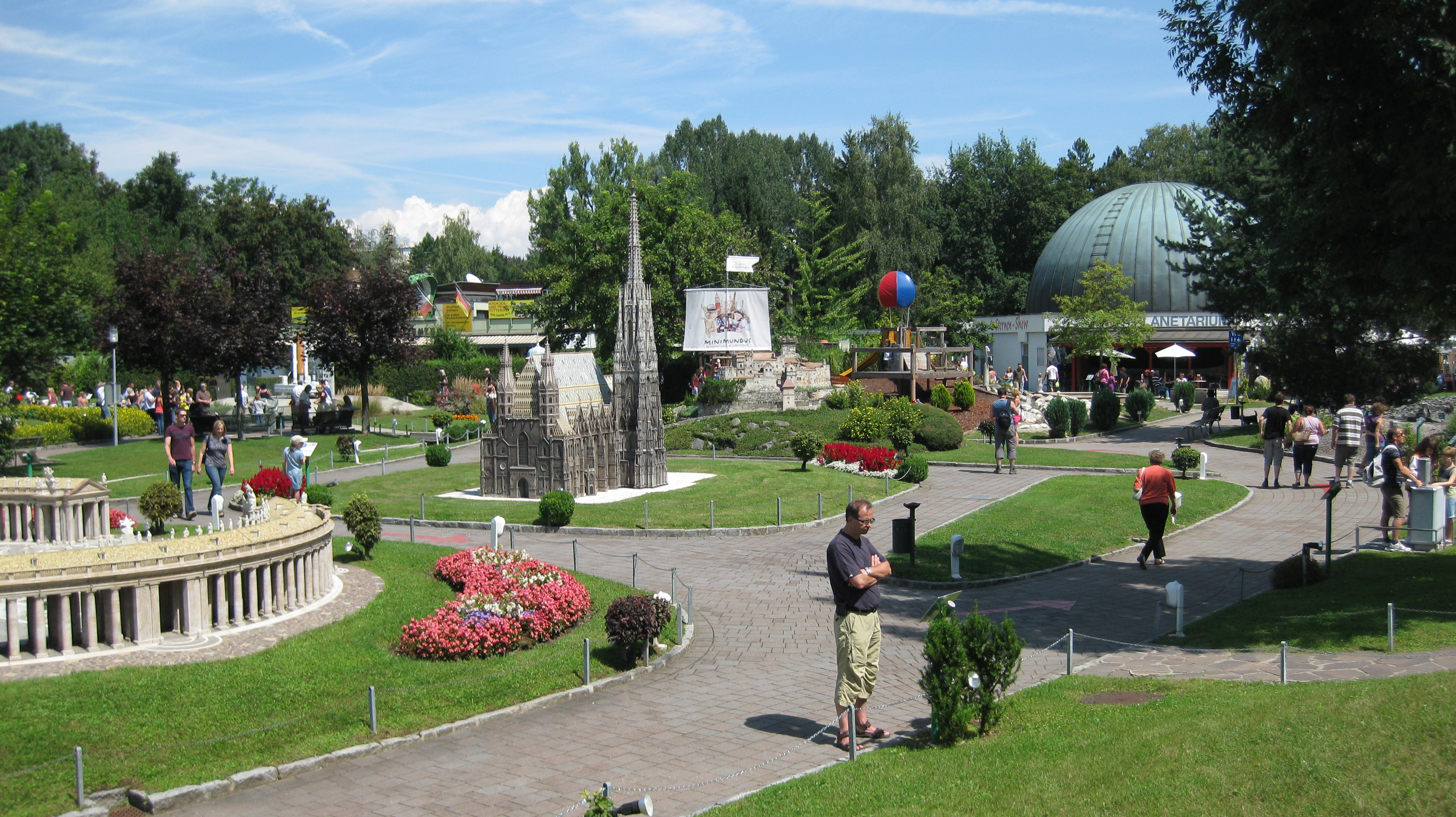
Minimundus

==== Austria ====
- Minimundus, Klagenfurt

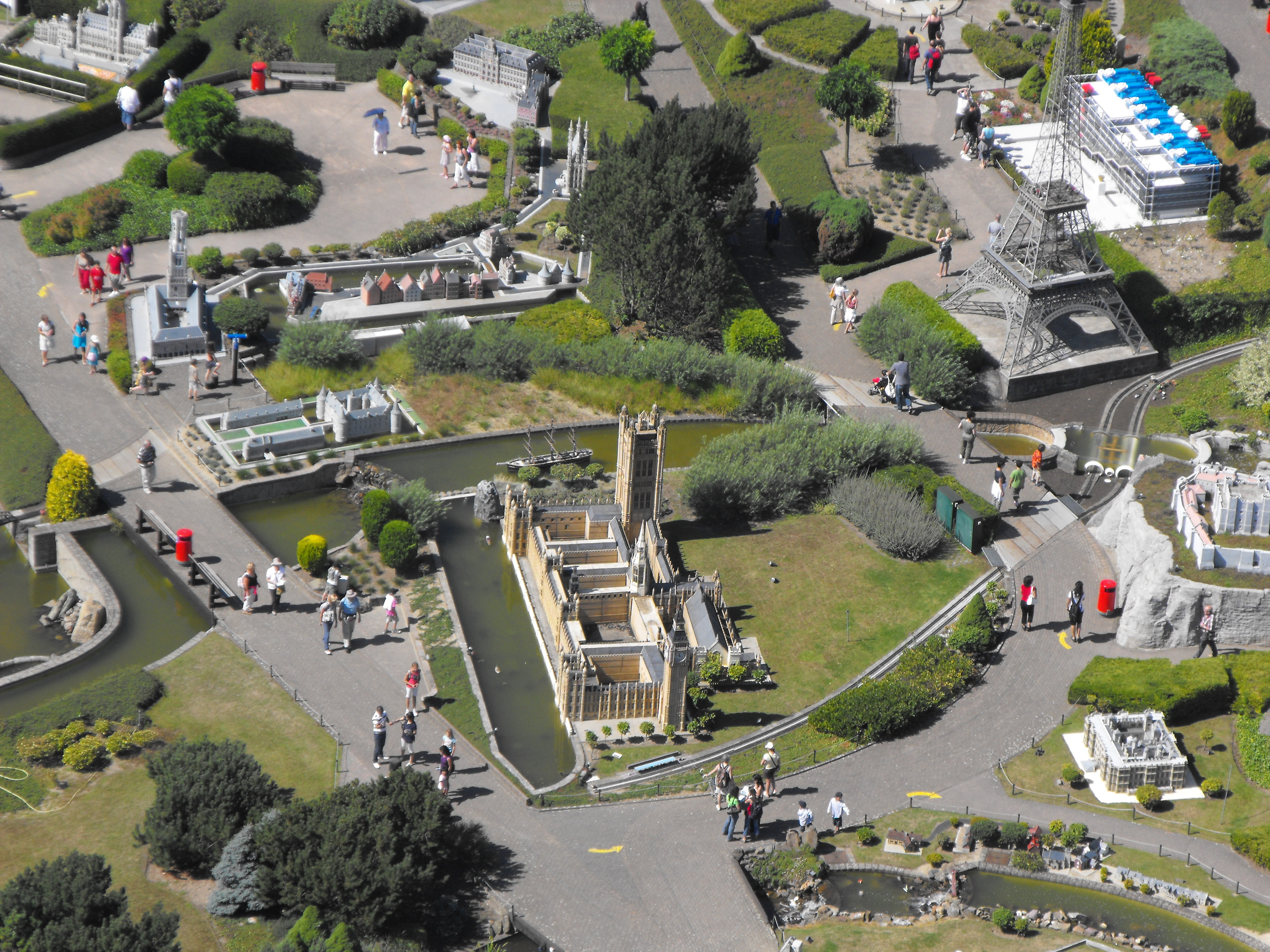
Mini-Europe

==== Belgium ====
- Mini-Europe, Brussels

==== Denmark ====
- Legoland Billund, Billund (the original Legoland)

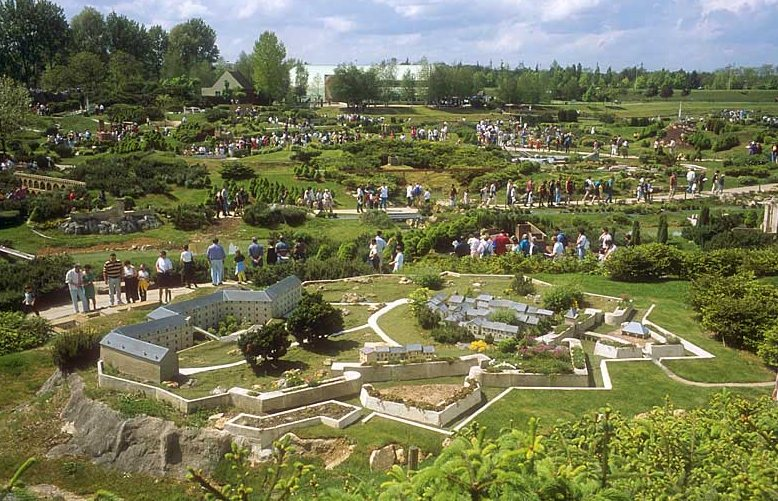
France Miniature

==== France ====
- France Miniature, Élancourt
- Mini World Lyon
- Storybook Land Canal Boats, Disneyland Park (Paris)

==== Germany ====
- Legoland Deutschland, Günzburg, Bavaria
- Little Harz, Wernigerode, Saxony-Anhalt
- Miniatur Wunderland, Hamburg (indoor)

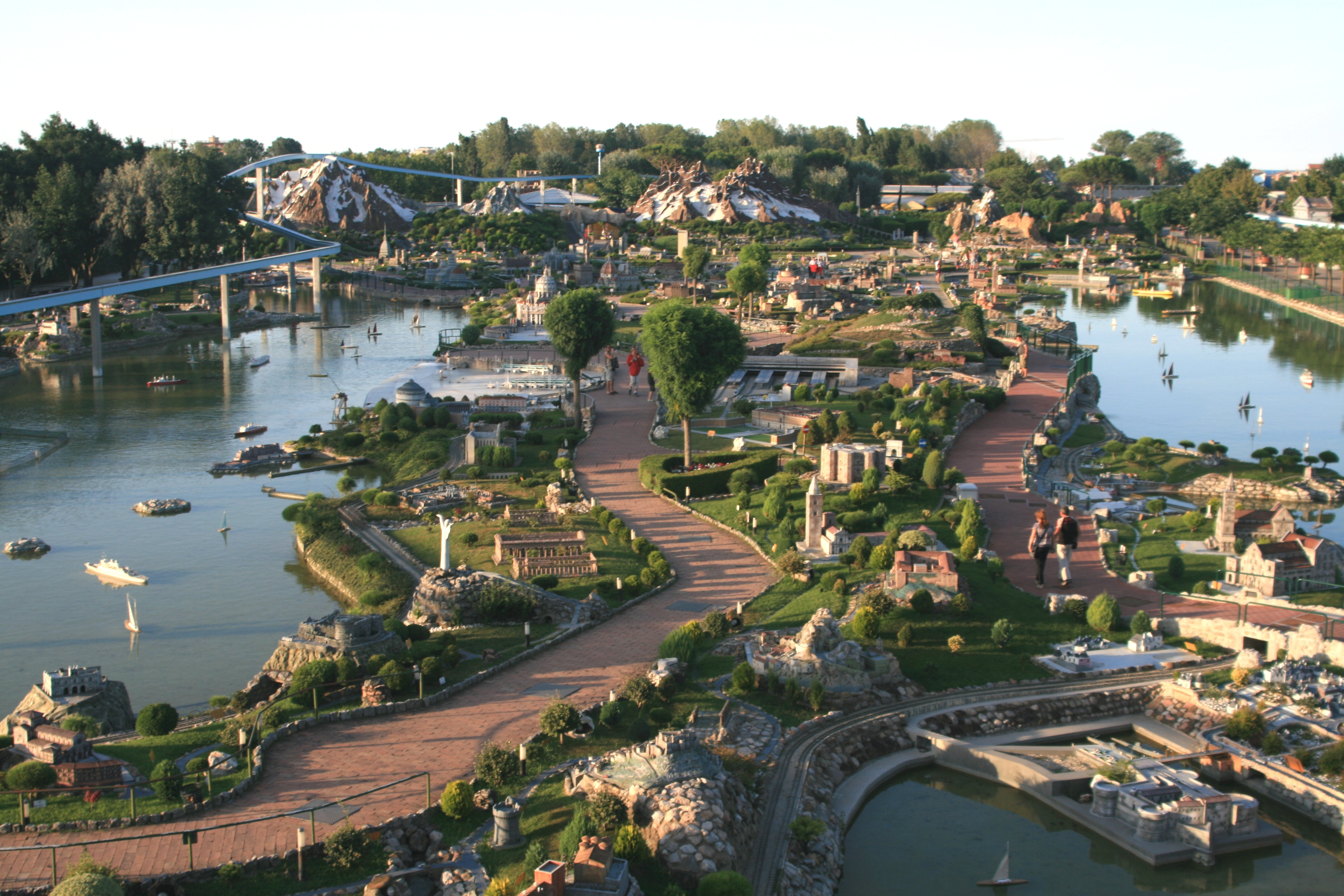
Italia in miniatura

==== Italy ====
- Italia in miniatura, Rimini

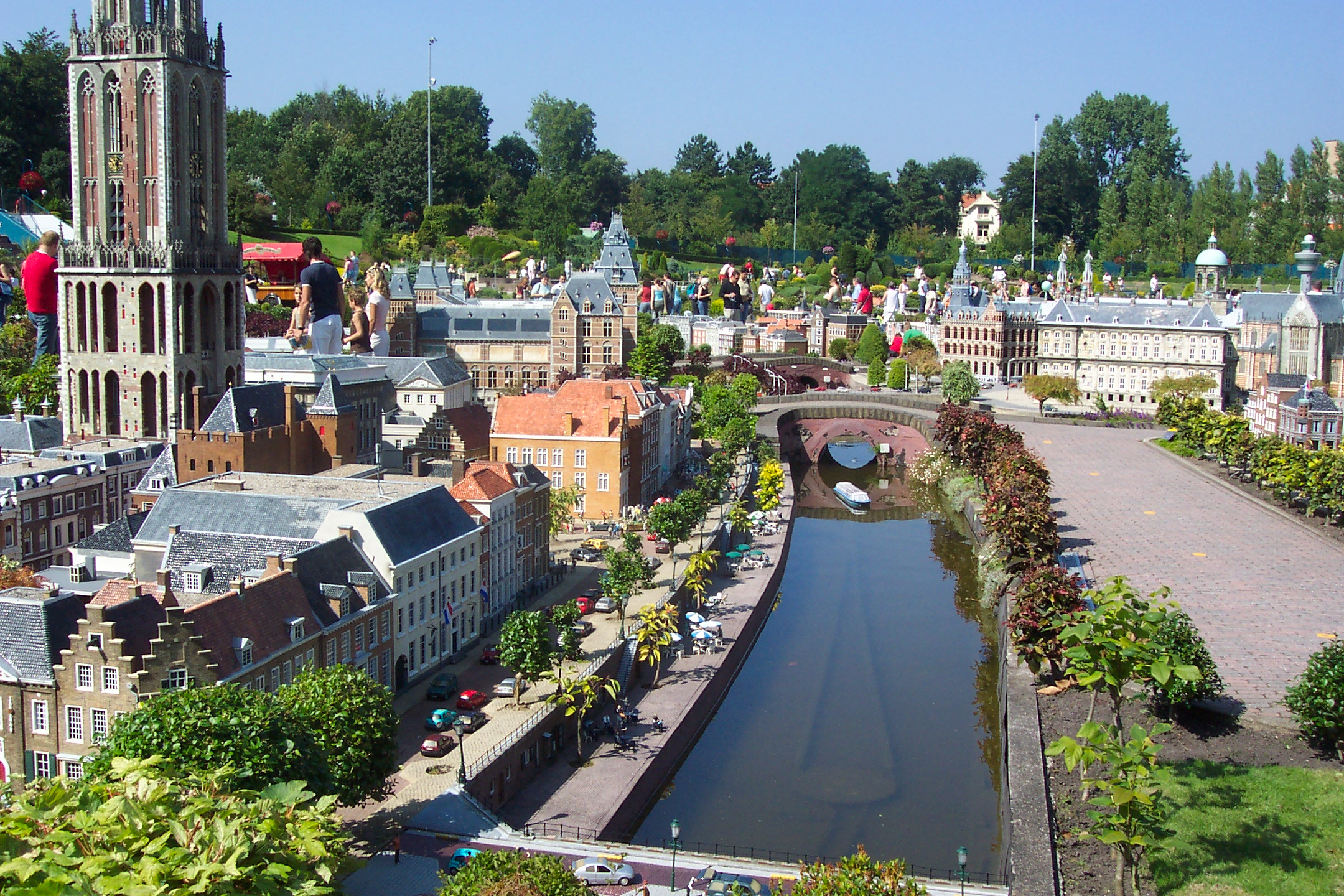
Madurodam

==== Netherlands ====
- Madurodam, The Hague

==== Portugal ====
- Portugal dos Pequenitos, Coimbra

==== Russia ====
- Grand Maket Rossiya, Saint Petersburg (indoor)

==== Slovakia ====
- Park miniatúr, Podolie

==== Spain ====
- Catalunya en Miniatura, Catalunya

==== Switzerland ====
- Swiss Vapeur Parc, Valais

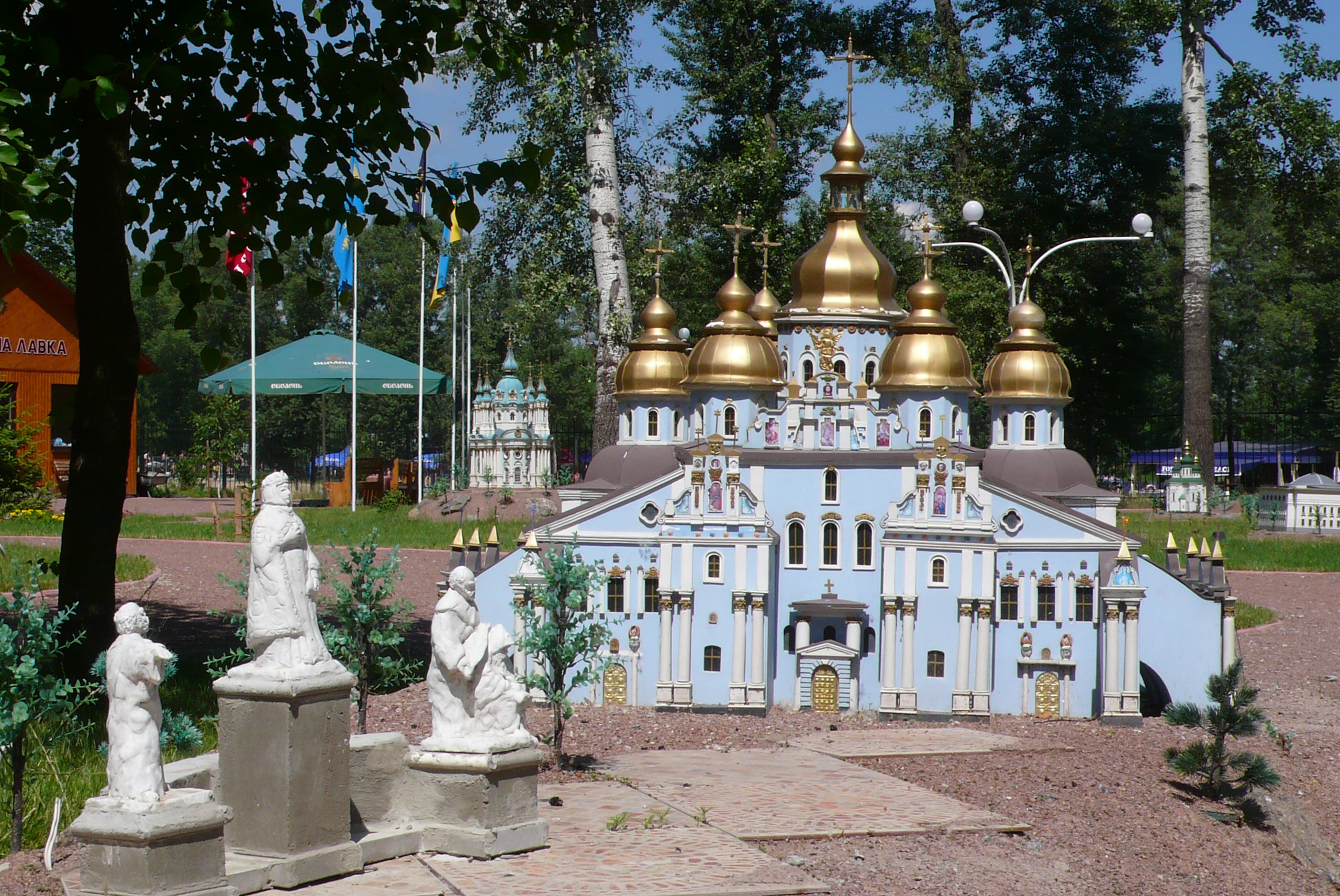
Kyiv in Miniature

==== Ukraine ====
- Kyiv in Miniature

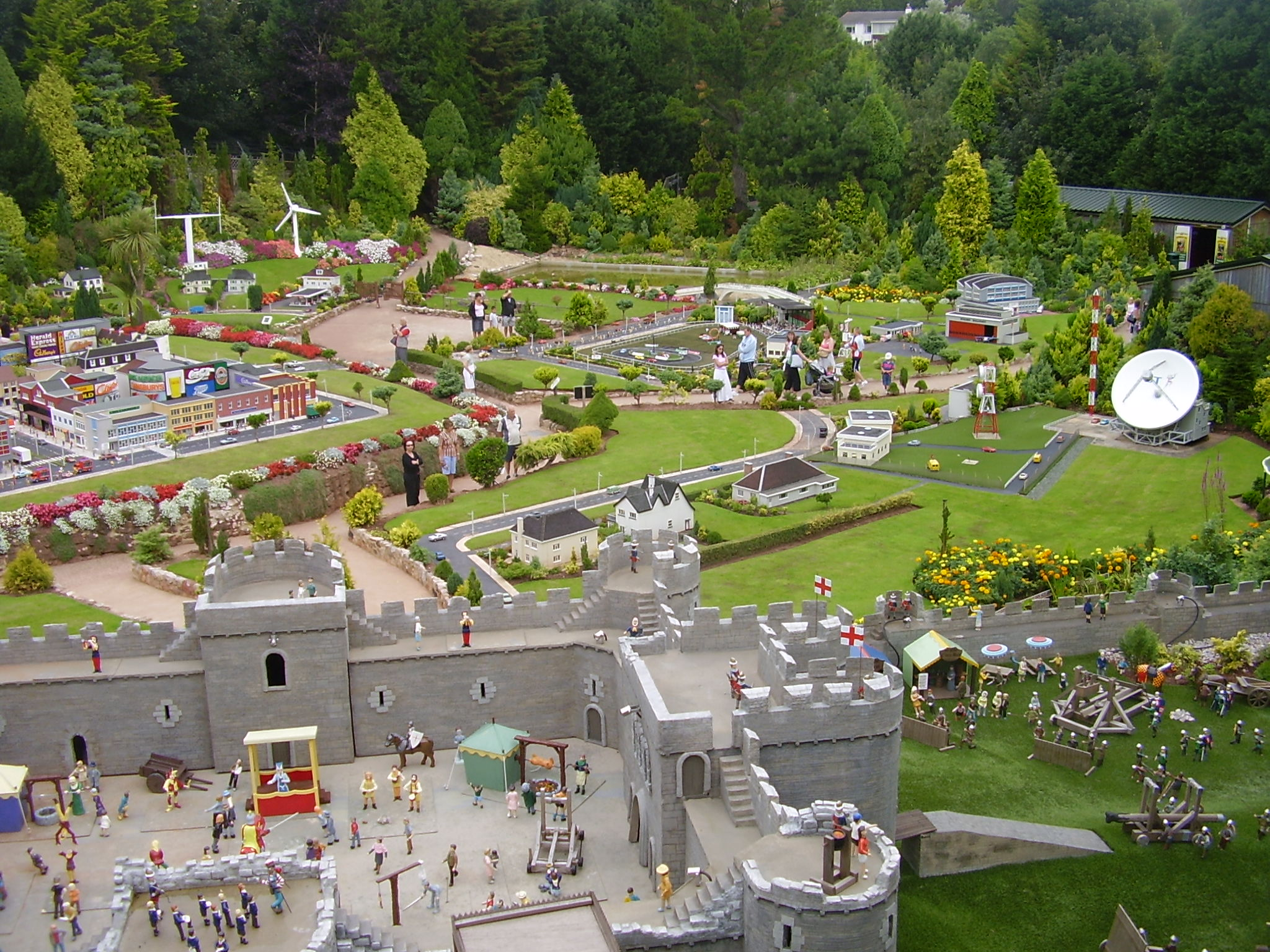
An overview of the Babbacombe Model Village

==== England ====
- Babbacombe Model Village, Babbacombe, Devon
- Bekonscot, Beaconsfield, Buckinghamshire
- Bourton-on-the-Water model village, Bourton-on-the-Water, Gloucestershire, opened in 1937.
- Godshill Model Village, Godshill, Isle of Wight
- Haigh Hall Miniature Railway, Wigan
- Legoland Windsor, Windsor, Berkshire
- Pendon Museum, Pendon, Oxfordshire
- Southport Model Railway Village
- Tucktonia, Dorset, closed in 1985
- Wimborne Model Town
- 'Wolf's Cove' at Snowshill Manor

=== Americas ===
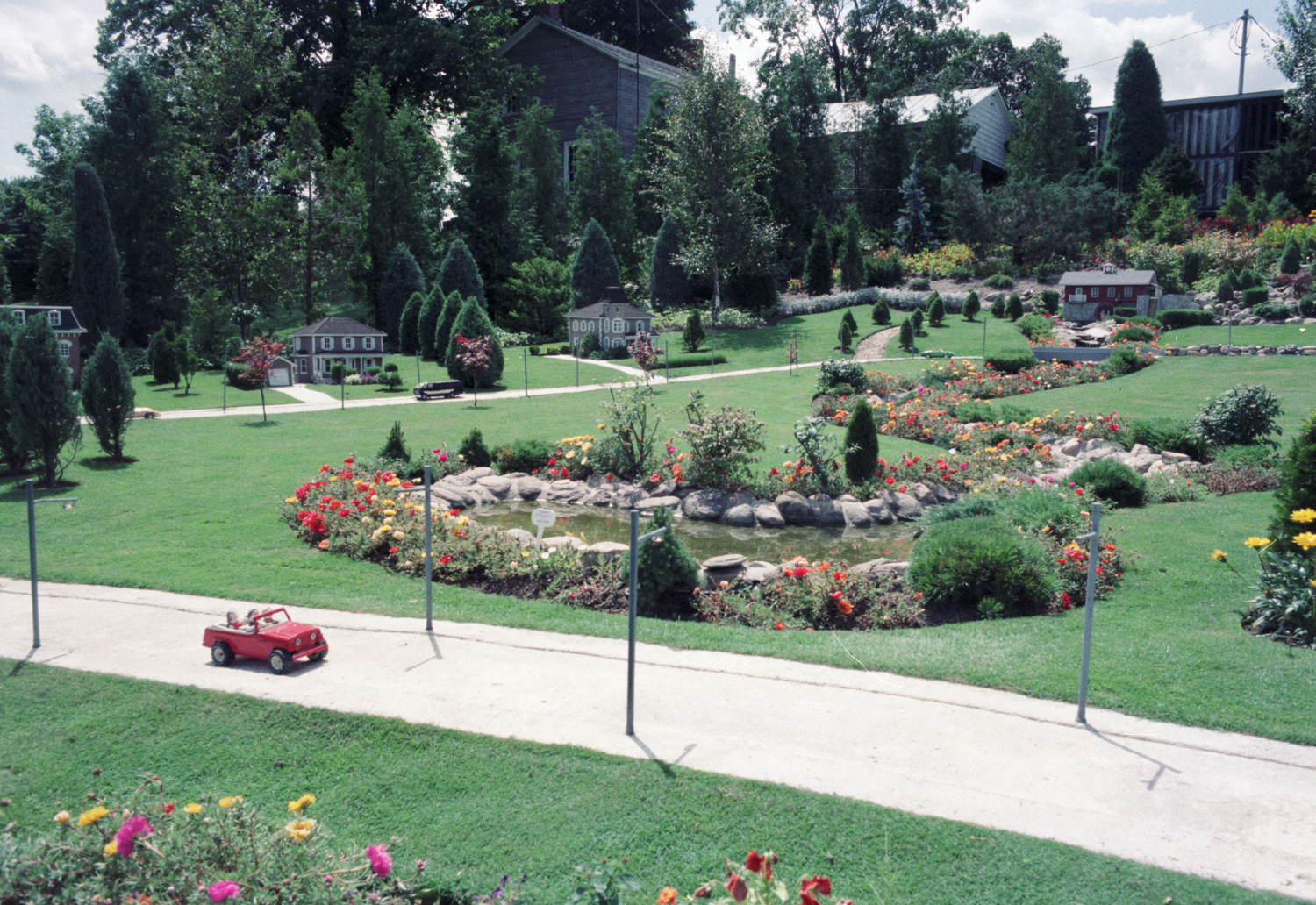
Former Cullen Gardens and Miniature Village, Whitby, Ontario

==== Brazil ====
- Mini Mundo, Gramado, Rio Grande do Sul, opened in 1981

==== Canada ====
- Canadia Niagara Falls, Ontario, opened in 1966 - closed
- Cullen Gardens and Miniature Village, Whitby, Ontario, opened in 1980 - closed in the mid-2000s
- Pocket Planet Canada, Toronto, Ontario, opened in 2021
- Woodleigh Replicas, Burlington, Prince Edward Island, closed
- Tivoli Miniature World, Jordan, Ontario, closed in the 1990s

==== United States ====
- Tiny Town, Morrison, Colorado, opened in 1921
- Tiny Town, Springfield, Missouri, opened in 1925
- Miniature Railroad & Village, Pittsburgh, Pennsylvania opened 1920s
- Ave Maria Grotto, Cullman, Alabama, opened in 1933
- Roadside America, Pennsylvania, opened in 1935, closed 2020
- Choo Choo Barn, Strasburg, Pennsylvania
- Storybook Land Canal Boats, Disneyland, California opened in 1956
- Palestine Park, Chautauqua Institution in Chautauqua, New York
- Splendid China (Florida), opened in 1993, closed 2003
- Holy Land Experience, Orlando, Florida, the park has a scale model of Jerusalem, Israel, closed 2020
- Forbidden Gardens, Katy, Texas, opened in 1997, closed 2011
- San Diego Model Railroad Museum, San Diego, California, opened in 1981
- Legoland California, Carlsbad, California, opened in 1999
- Legoland Florida, Winter Haven, Florida, opened 2011
- Legoland New York, Goshen, New York, opened 2021
- Northlandz, Raritan Township, New Jersey, opened in 1991

=== Asia/Pacific Region ===
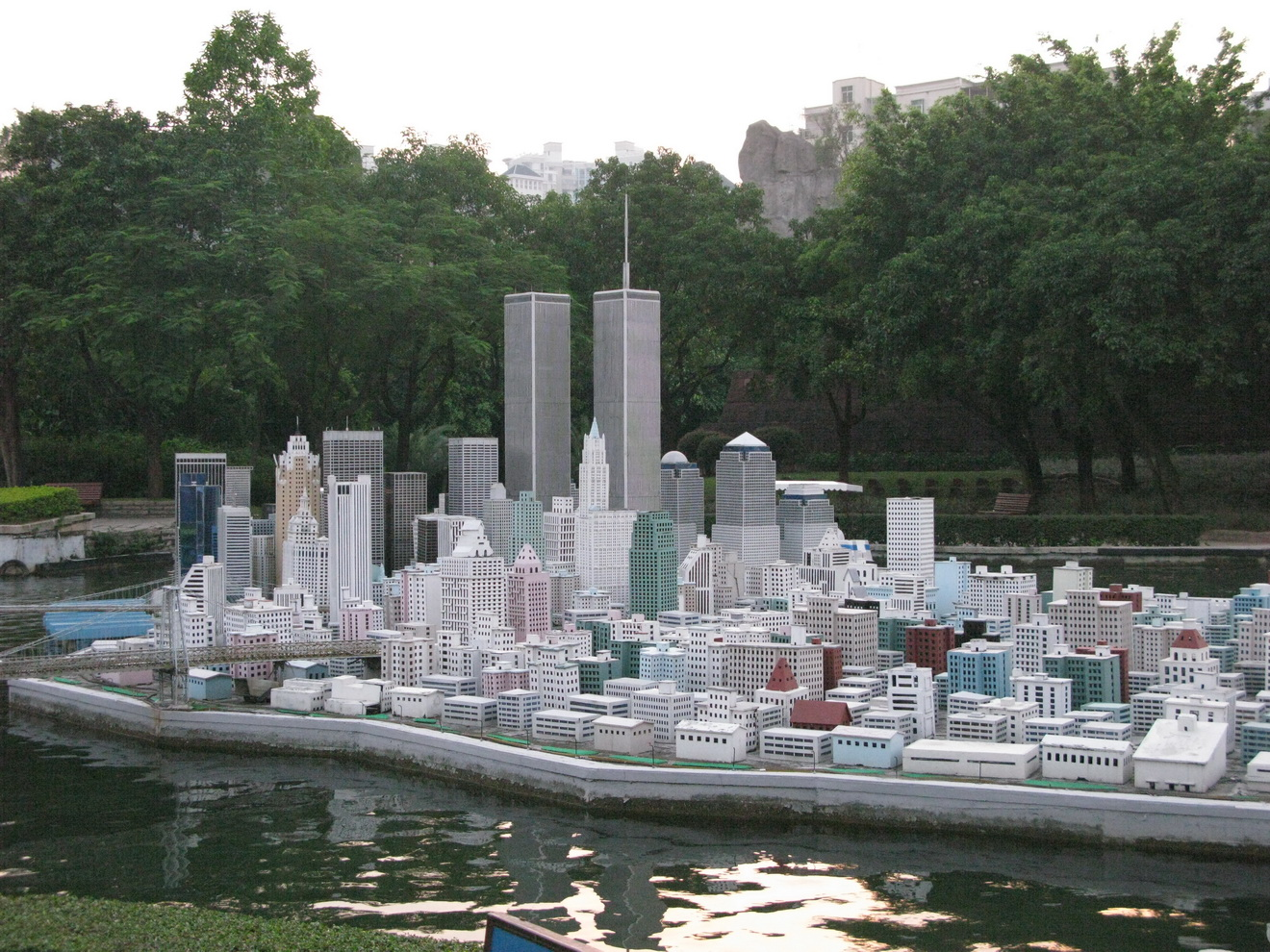
Window of the World, Shenzhen

==== Australia ====
- Cockington Green Gardens, Canberra

==== China ====
- Beijing World Park
- Grand World Scenic Park, outskirts of Guangzhou, closed
- Legoland Shanghai, Shanghai
- Splendid China, Shenzhen
- Window of the World, Shenzhen

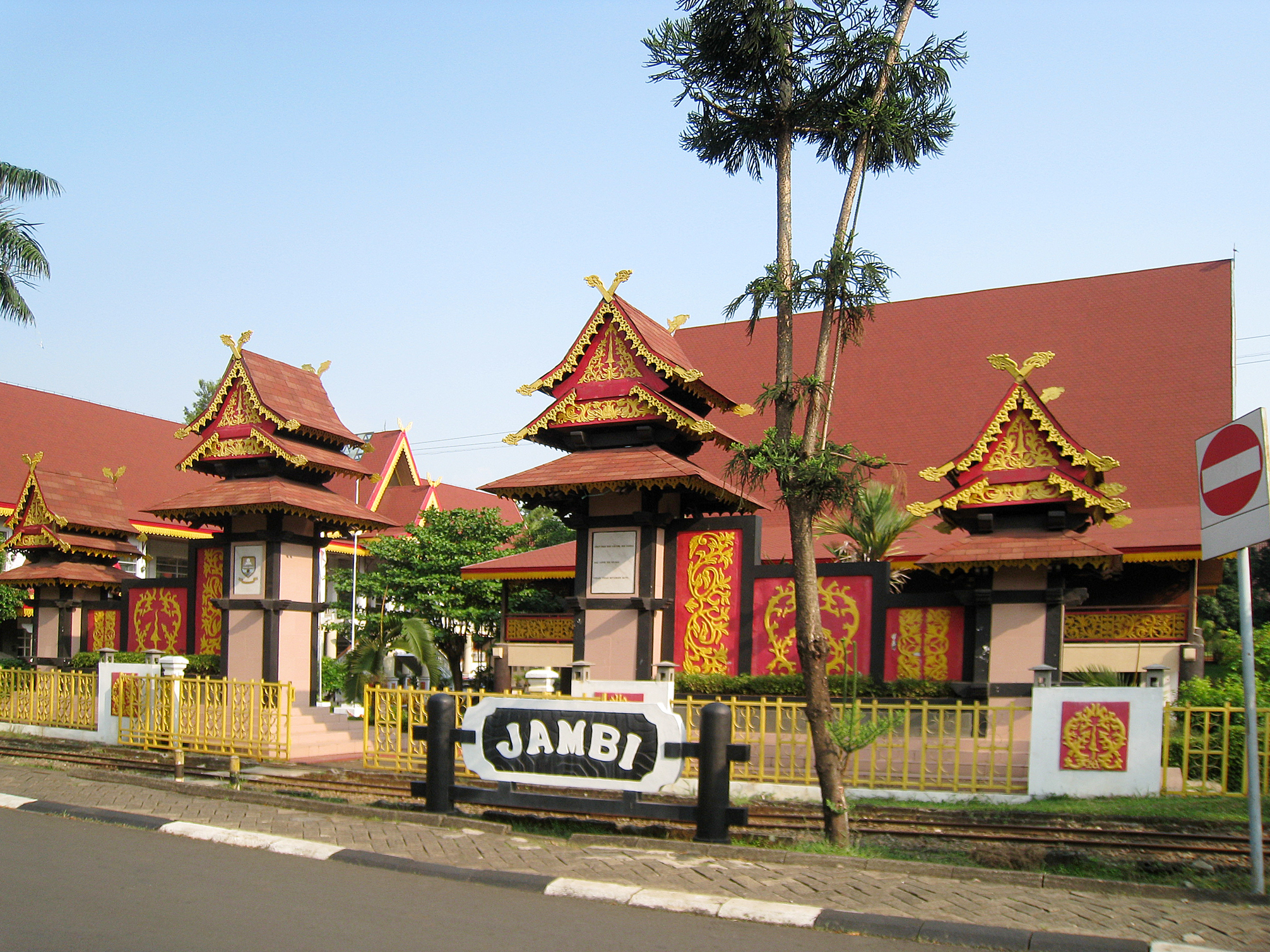
Jambi Pavilion in Taman Mini Indonesia Indah

==== Indonesia ====
- Taman Mini Indonesia Indah, Jakarta

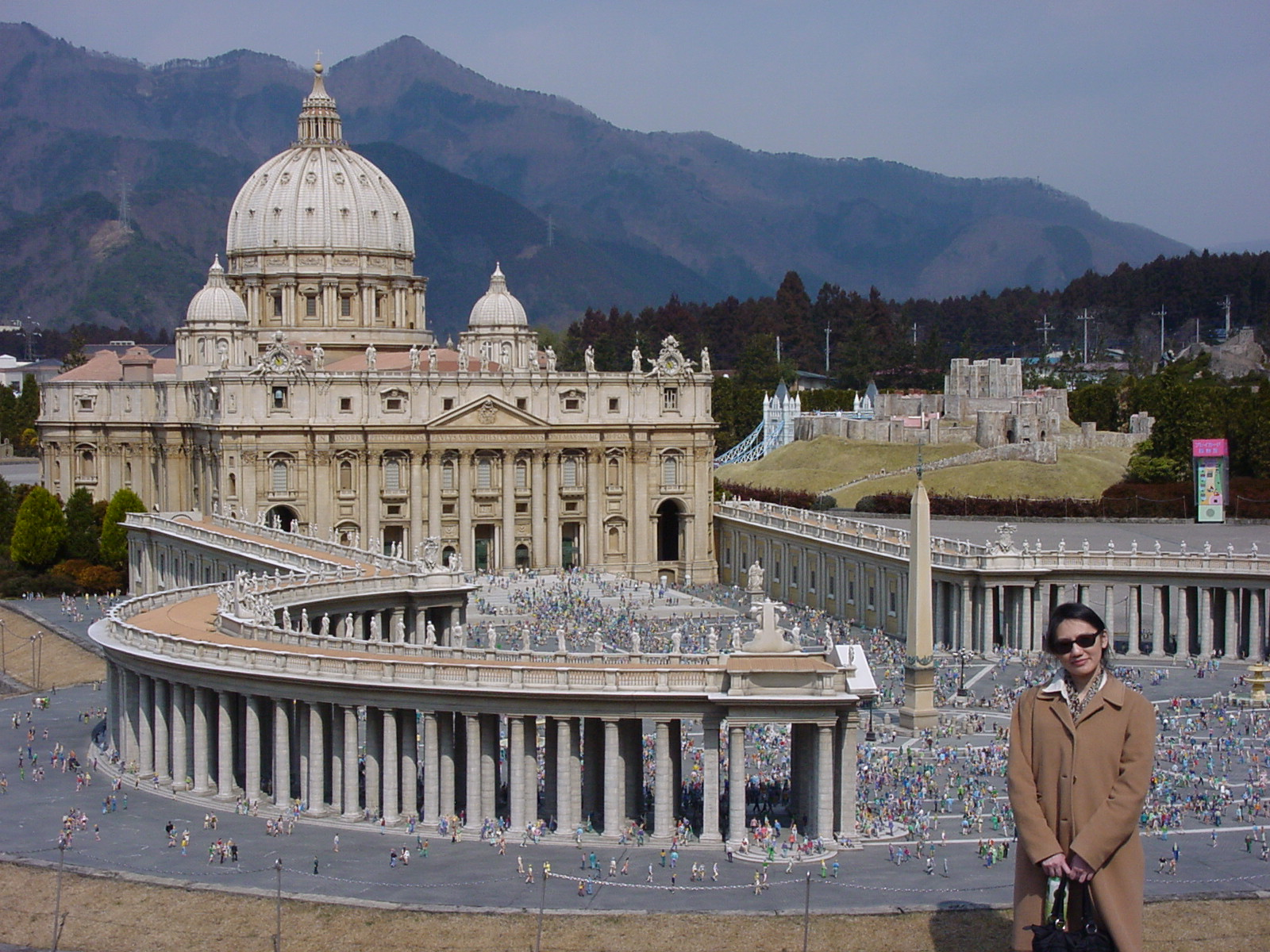
Replica of St Peter's Basilica in Tobu World Square, Japan

==== Japan ====
- Legoland Japan, Nagoya, Aichi
- Small Worlds Miniature Museum, Kōtō, Tokyo (indoor)
- Tobu World Square, Kinugawa Onsen, Nikkō, Tochigi

==== Malaysia ====
- Islamic Heritage Park, Kuala Terengganu, Terengganu
- Legoland Malaysia, Iskandar Malaysia, Johor
- Tropical Village, Ayer Hitam, Johor

==== South Korea ====
- Legoland Korea, Chuncheon, Gangwon Province

==== Thailand ====
- Mini Siam, Pattaya, Chonburi
- Dusit Thani, Phaya Thai, Bangkok,

=== Middle East ===
==== Israel ====
- Jerusalem’s Model in the Late 2nd Temple Period, Israel Museum, Israel
- Mini Israel, Latrun, Israel

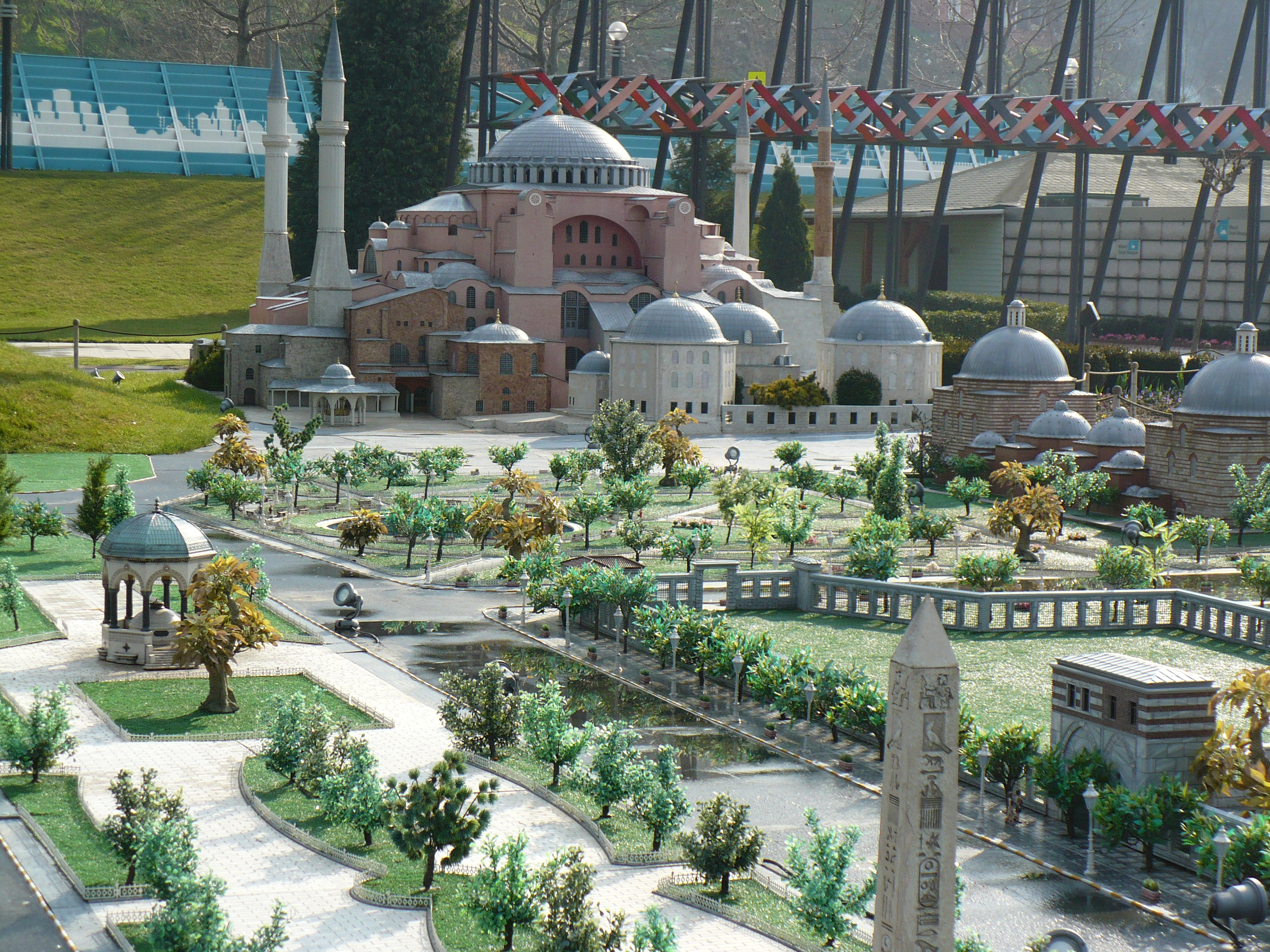
Hagia Sophia at Miniatürk

==== Turkey ====
- Miniatürk, Istanbul

==== United Arab Emirates ====
- Legoland Dubai, Dubai
