= Dusit Thani =

Miniature city and micronation project by Rama VI

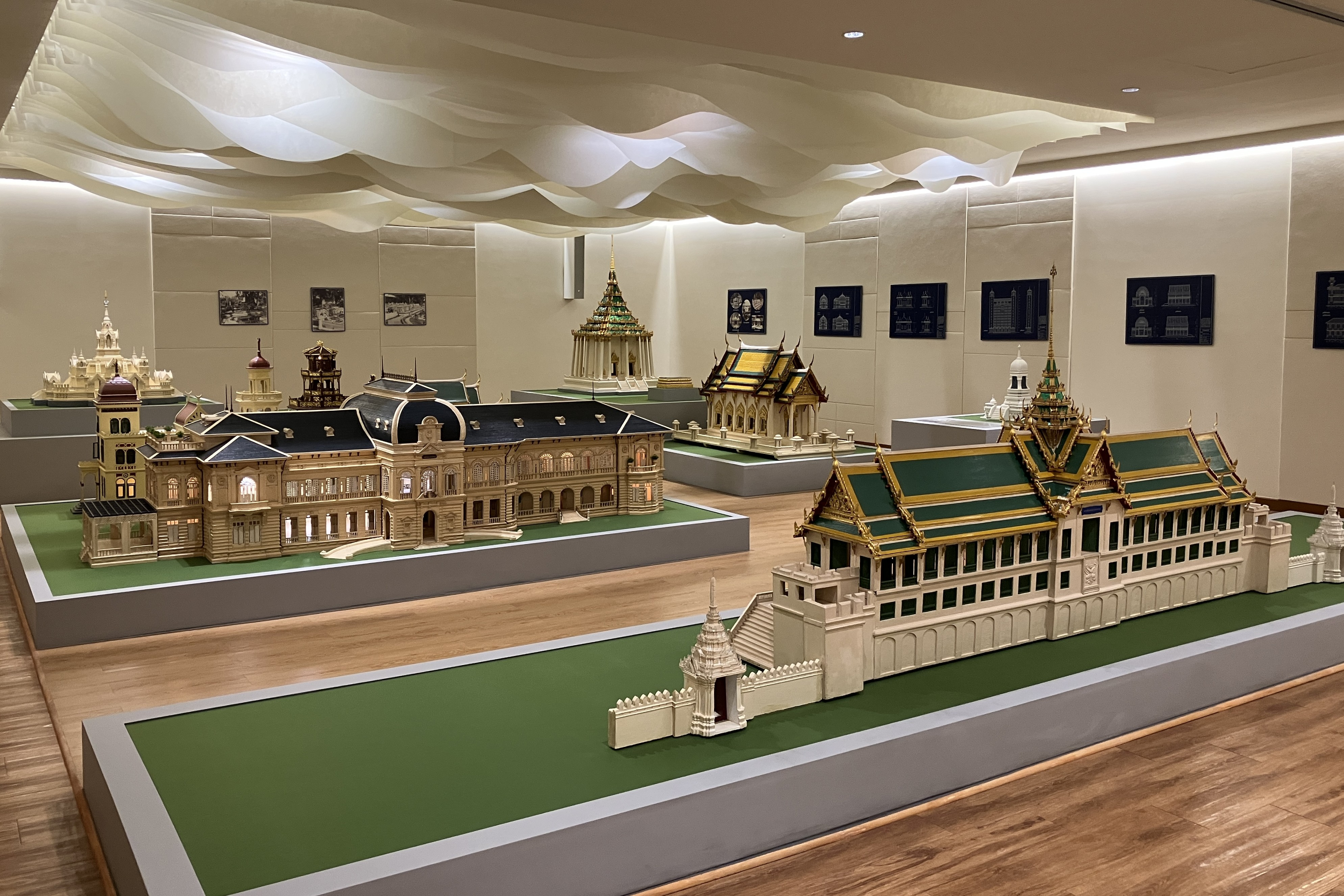
Miniature buildings from Dusit Thani, displayed at the King Vajiravudh Memorial Hall

Dusit Thani (Thai: ดุสิตธานี) was a miniature city and micronation project created by King Vajiravudh (Rama VI) of Siam (Thailand) in Dusit Palace (later moved to Phaya Thai) in the 1910s–1920s. The project explored aspects of democracy, as members of the court were to be "citizens" owning property in the model city. Elections were held, a constitution written, and two newspapers regularly published for the fictional country. Although critics have dismissed the project as nothing more than the king playing with dollhouses, others regard it as the first trial of a constitutional government in Thailand.

== Creation ==
In the nineteenth century, miniature objects became a fad, especially in England where King Rama VI was educated. Dusit Thani was an example of the miniature object at that period. The intention of the city was to show equality of all citizens in a democratic society. Craftsmen were hired by noble families in Bangkok in order to reconstruct their houses in the miniature city. They had to register and buy land to become citizens in the city. They could freely express and participate in debating public affairs in the city. Two political groups were founded in Dusit Thani, the Blue Party and the Red Party. King Rama VI adopted the name "MR. Rama" to participate in the city.

The reign of King Rama VI is considered one of the golden ages of Thai literature. He was hoping to educate his citizens about democracy and set up Dusit Thani, a democratic model city. It was difficult for Thais at that time to understand the king, who was Westernized, and his concept of democracy because it was unfamiliar and hard to comprehend.

Dusit Thani was a Thai miniature city that was designed as a model city, established by King Vajiravudh or King Rama VI of Thailand. It was reported that Dusit Park was originally sited as the location of the city, which later was moved to Phraya Thai at the end of 1919. "Dusit Thani" means 'town in heaven'. "Dusit" is the name of the fourth of the six levels of Buddhist heaven and "Thani" means 'town'. King Rama VI was interested in democracy as he was the first Thai king to go to study abroad in England and to pursue the intention of his father (King Rama V) and grandfather (King Rama IV) of bringing modernization to the nation. The city was an experiment in democratic constitution which the king, himself, chose to initiate.

== Construction ==
Dusit Park was a rice field before modernizing. The miniature model city was planned on one acre of the Dusit Park or the Royal Amporn Gardens near the present Congress building. Buildings inside Dusit Thani were scaled to one-fifteenth life size. Palaces, hotels, hospitals, a clock tower, 12-story buildings, a fire brigade, a bank, flying bridges, trade centers, canal locks, and newspapers, were represented in the city.

Later, Dusit Thani was relocated to Phraya Thai where it was redeveloped.

== Subsequent events ==
The project did not proceed beyond its model scale. The constitution would be used only in the miniature city but not nationwide. The constitution of Dusit Thani was written by King Rama VI and it was administered by the Blue and the Red political groups with representatives selected by elections. In 1925, the king died, which caused a halt to the miniature city project and the city was abandoned. There were some attempts by Thai students, who were educated in Europe and had been interested in democracy and modernization, to carry on the ideal of democracy. Seven years after the king's death a revolution occurred. A new government, a constitutional monarchy, replaced 700 years of absolute monarchy. However, Dusit Thani had a different path. The model city was poorly preserved after the king's death and had never been repaired. Only a few surviving buildings were moved to the gardens of the Monk's Hospital. They were either covered by dust or ended up in trash cans. No remains are left to be seen today except for a tiny bandstand.
