= Mini Siam =

Coordinates: 12.9545°N 100.9097°E

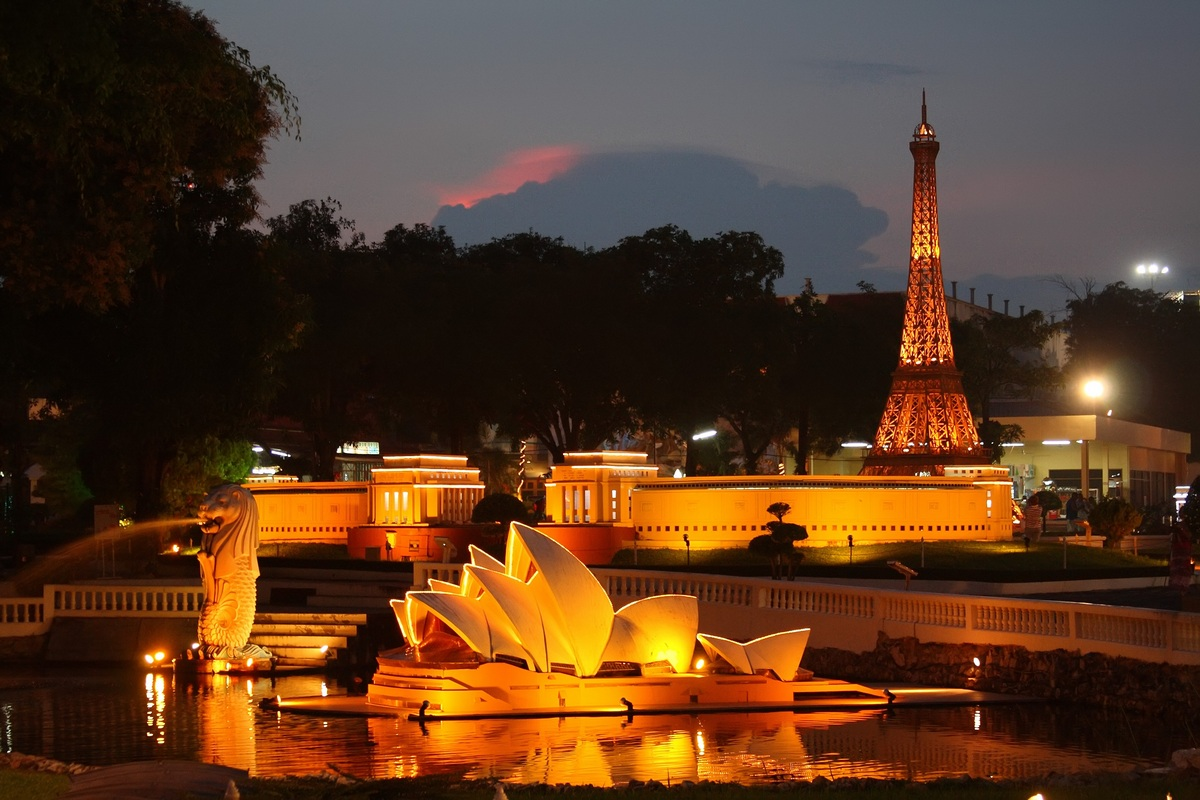
- Mini Siam at dusk in 2010
- Interactive map of Mini Siam
- Location: Pattaya, Chonburi Province, Thailand
- Status: Operating
- Opened: 1986
- Theme: Miniature Park
- Operating season: All year round
- Area: 46,400 m^{2} (499,000 sq ft)

Mini Siam and Mini Europe, commonly just called Mini Siam (Thai: เมืองจำลอง, opened 1986) is a miniature park attraction in Pattaya, Chonburi, Thailand. This park is located 143 km from Bangkok on Sukhumvit Road. The park houses numerous famous landmarks from Thailand within its Mini Siam, whilst other famous landmarks from outside of Thailand are located within the Mini Europe section.

Mini Siam began in 1985 and was first opened by Kasem Kasemkietsakul, who was inspired by his interest in architecture and decided to open an educational tourist attraction. The Democracy Monument in Bangkok was the first model to be built. The components "Mini Europe" were added later. There is also a rest area, booking halls, souvenir shops for lease and parking lots.

== History ==
The park was founded by Kasem Kasemkietsakul. He had traveled numerous times to foreign nations for business and leisure, with also having an interest in fine art, architecture and sculpture. He would go on to be inspired by other miniature parks such as the Madurodum in the Netherlands, and the Window on World Theme Park in Taiwan. He realized in the 1980s that both Thai and international tourists had slim chances of possibly visiting all famous landmarks in the world, so Kasem then concluded to bring all these monuments together in one place for both tourists and students alike to learn about the architecture of Thailand. He would then endeavour on 5 years of studying significant sites across Thailand and the globe with the aim of transforming them into miniature versions. He would then launch Mini Siam in 1988 upon 30 rais of land he had bought.

== The Park ==
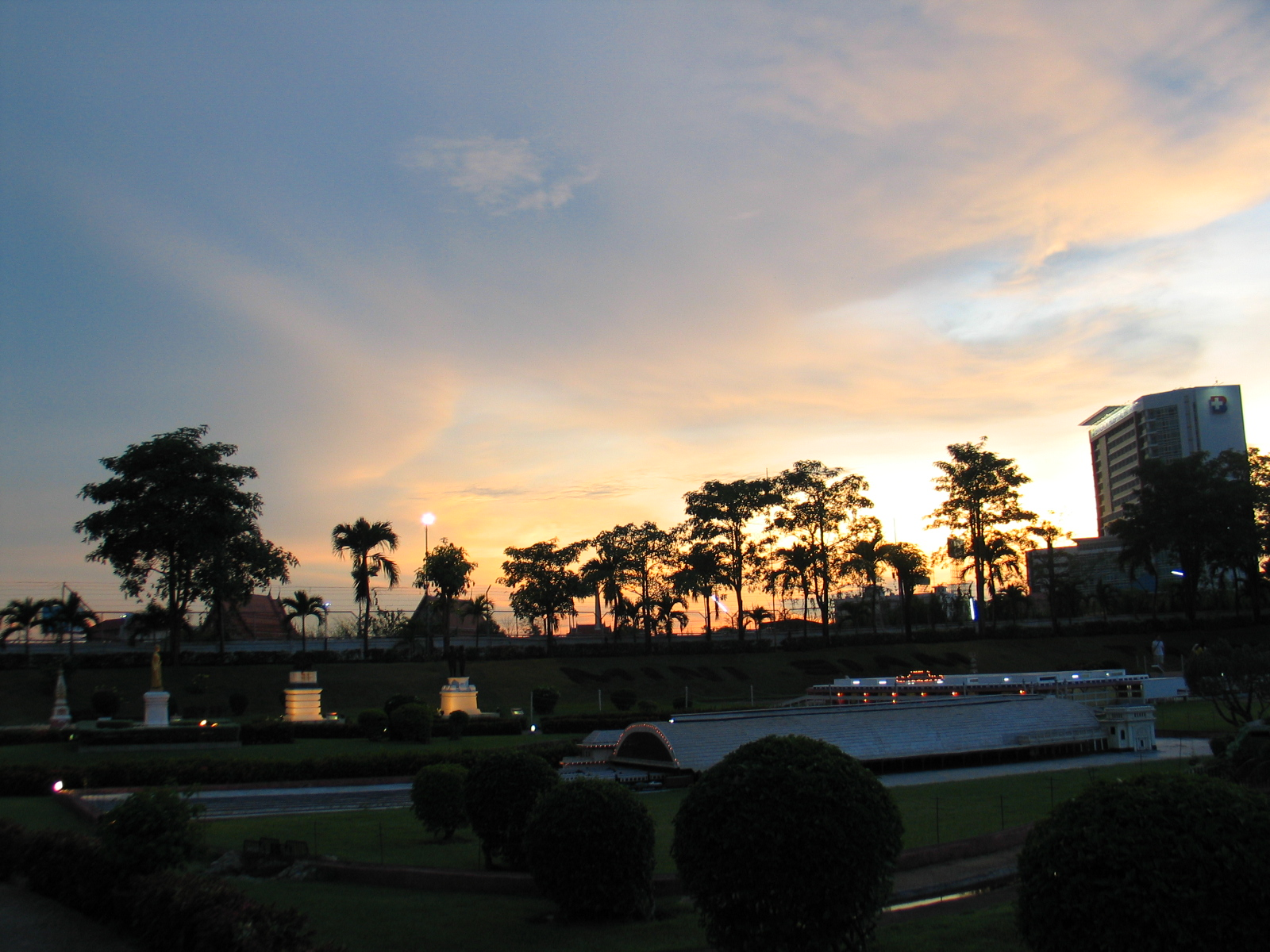
Mini Siam in the evening

Usually from 9.00 a.m to 7 p.m, the park has alternating traditional Thai dance performances such as Krabi Krabang. Mini Siam and Mini Europe are separated in the middle by a small body of water that serves as the backdrop for some sites such as the Sydney Opera House and bridges.

Replicas are constructed in a ratio of 1:25.

=== Mini Siam ===
Inspired by the idea of preserving sites in Thailand with much value and significance; and also the idea of reducing the time and cost of visiting all those these sites across the country; Mini Siam was built. On a scale of 1 - 25 (on what scale is the closest to the real structure), sites were built as a center for education, with the first miniature structure built being the Democracy Monument from Bangkok.

=== Mini World ===
Mini World - despite its name - contains buildings from across the nations outside of Thailand.This includes replicas of places in Australia, China, Brazil and the United States.

== Gallery ==
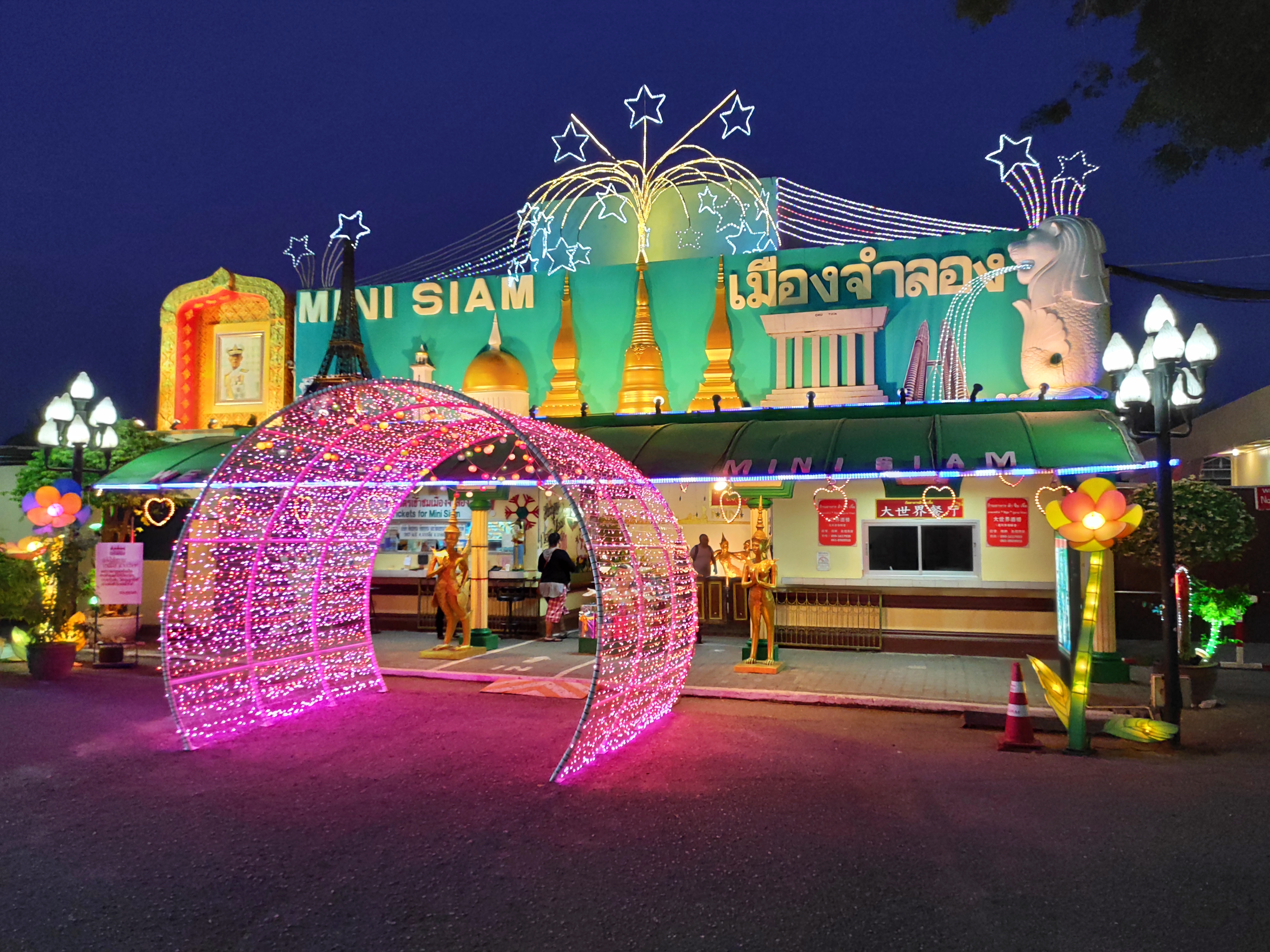
Entrance in February 2020

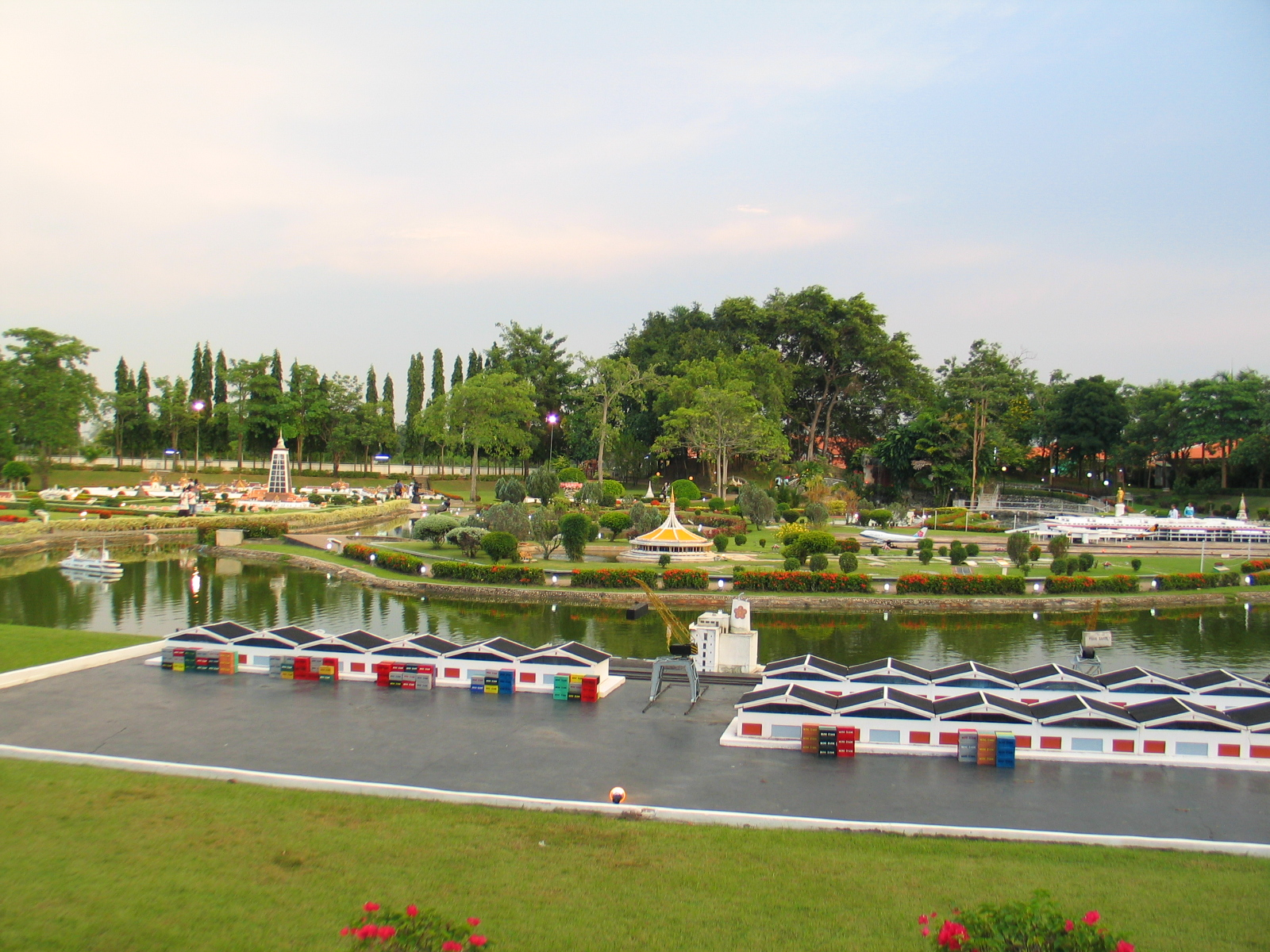
Lake area

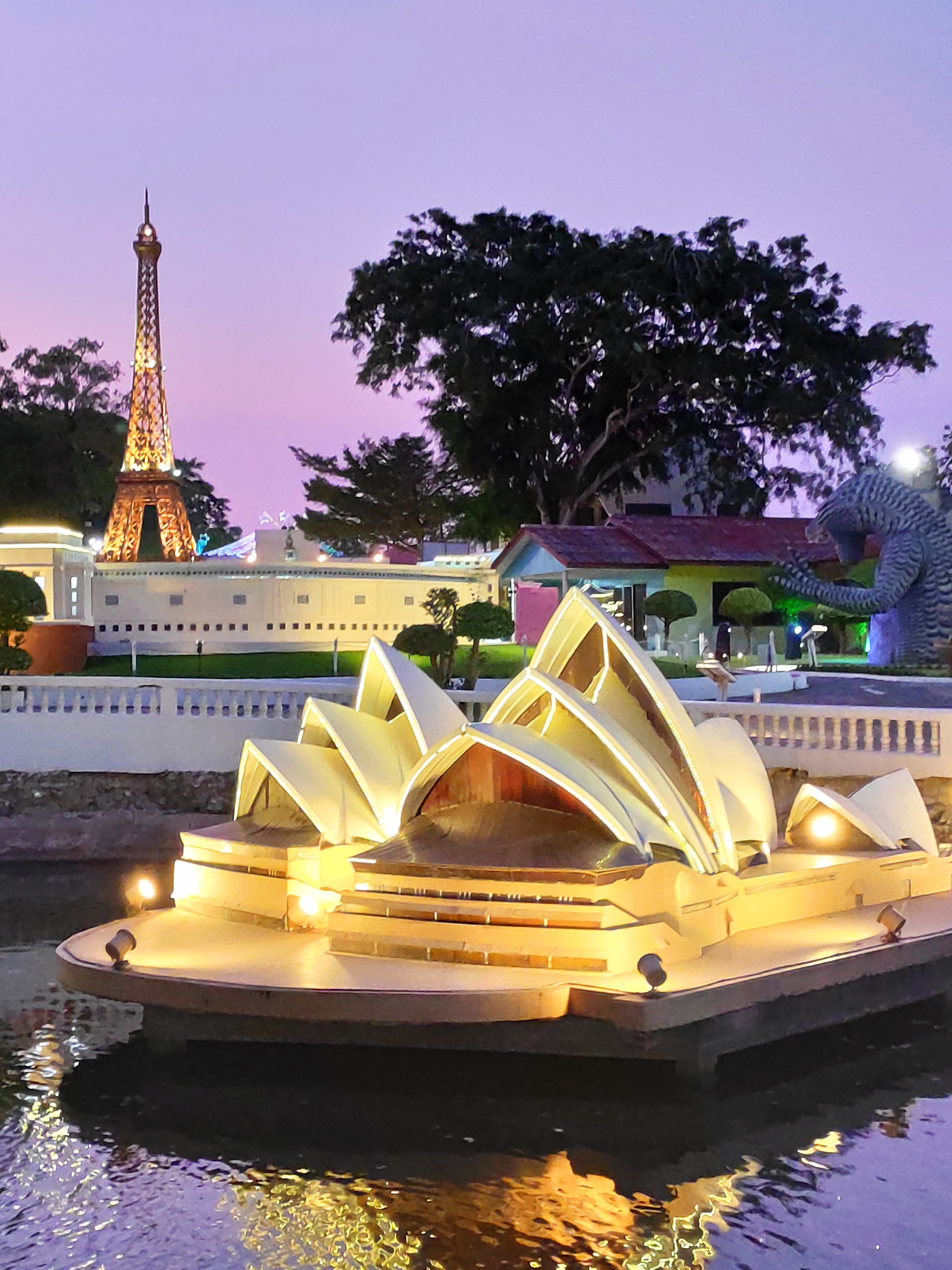
Sydney Opera House

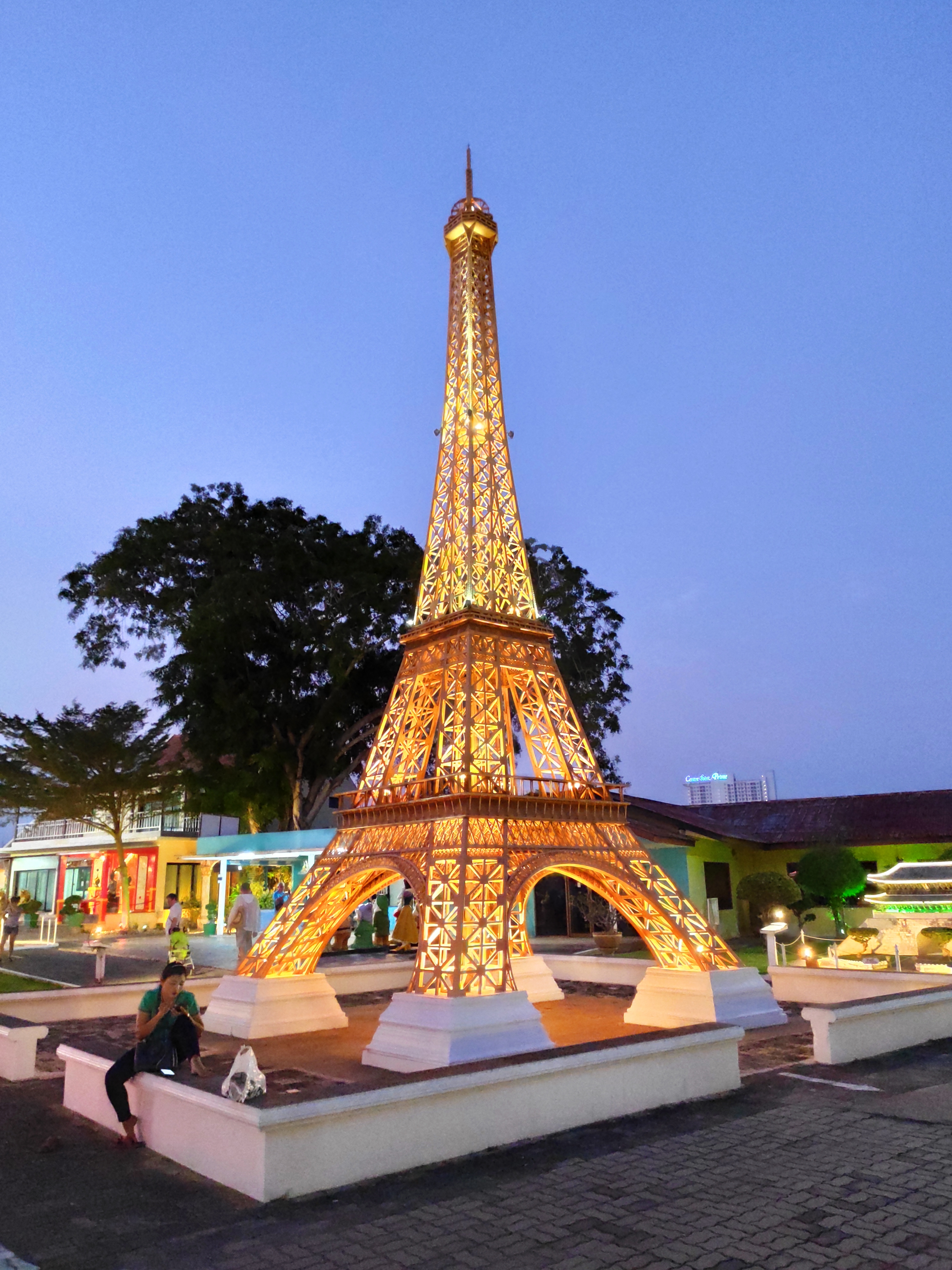
Eiffel Tower

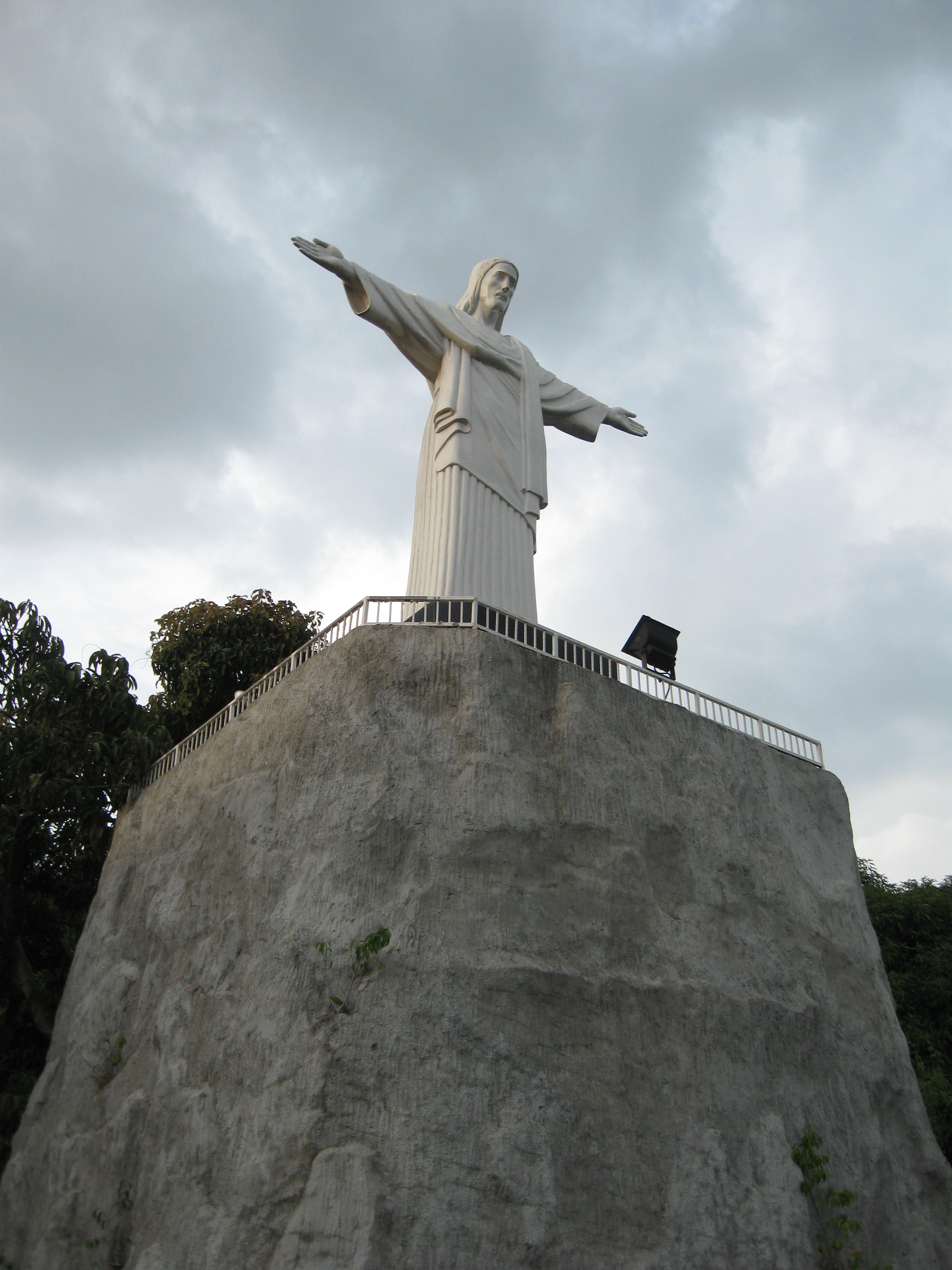
Christ the Redeemer

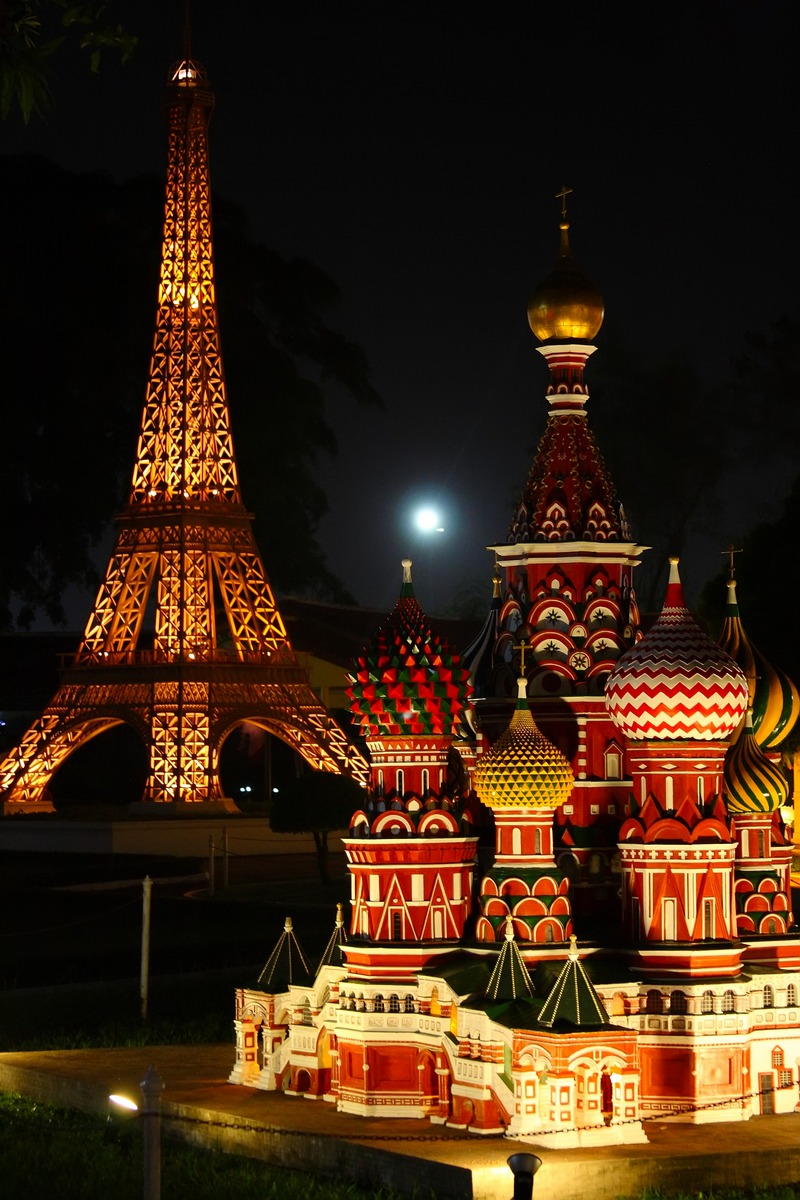
Saint Basil's Cathedral and the Eiffel Tower

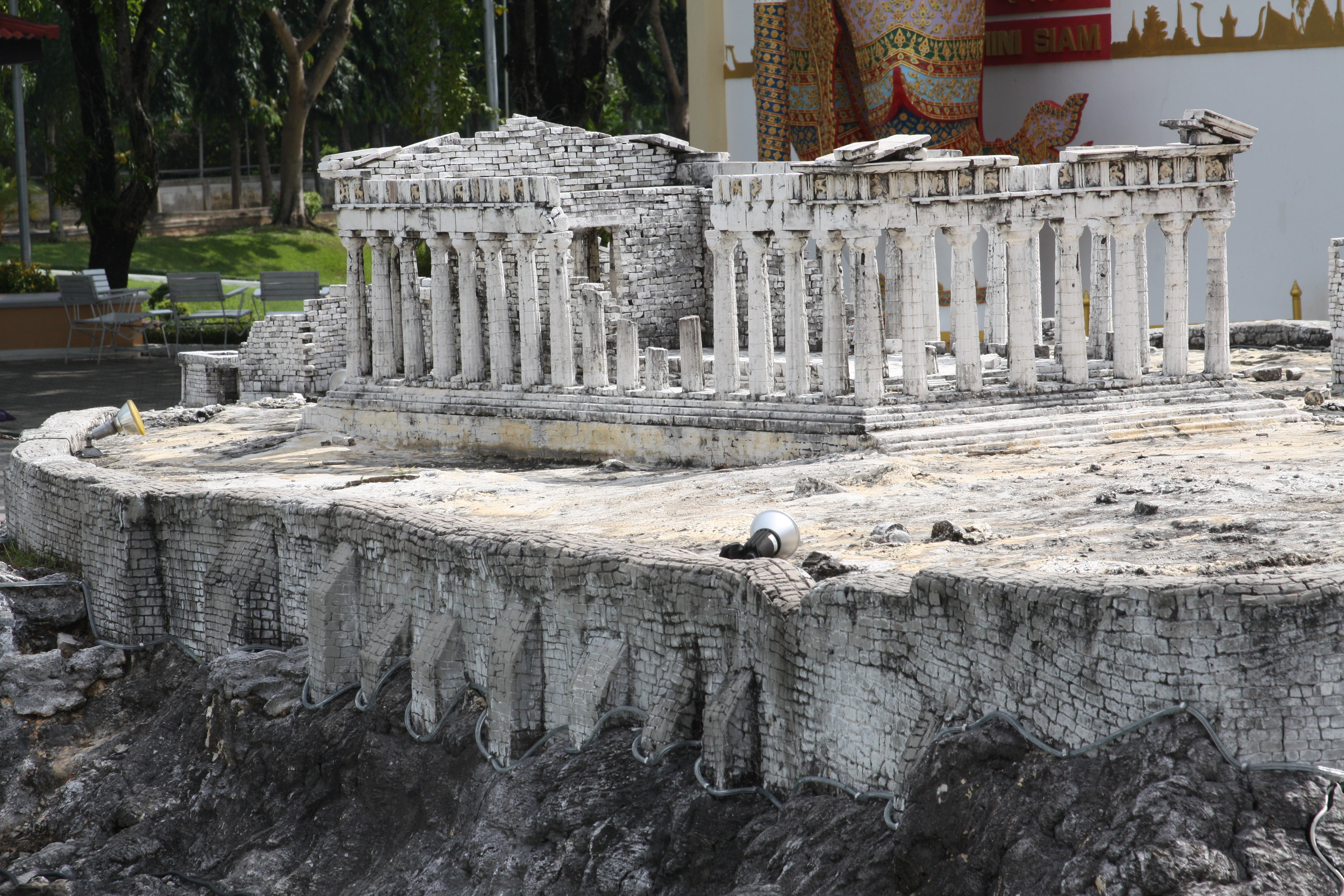
Acropolis of Athens
