= Wimborne Model Town =

Model town in Dorset, England

Coordinates: 50°47′54″N 1°59′27″W

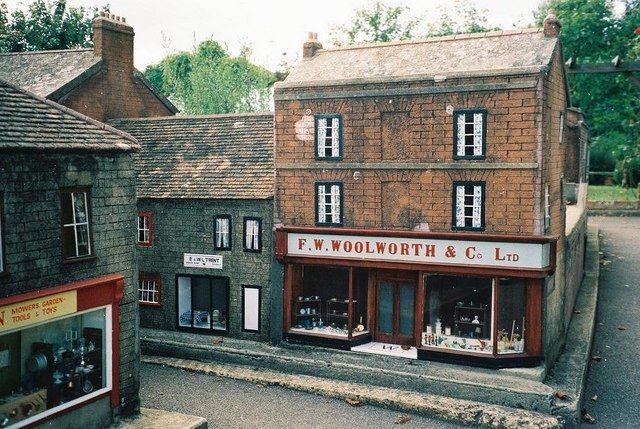
Wimborne model town - Woolworths, The Square

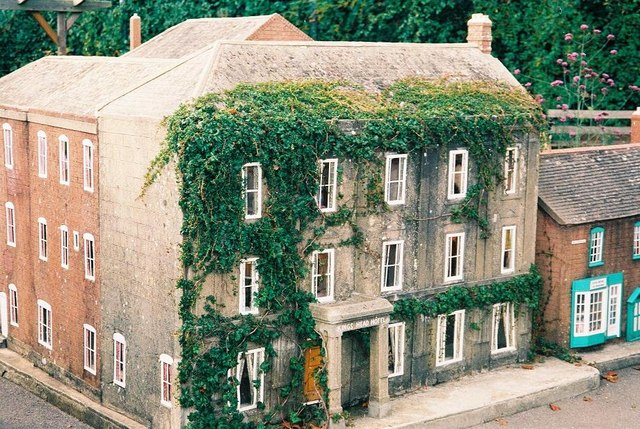
Wimborne model town, King's Head Hotel

Wimborne Model Town, situated on the edge of the town of Wimborne Minster, Dorset, England, is one of the largest and most established model towns in England. It depicts the town of Wimborne as it was at the time the model was originally made in the 1950s, and captures the essence of a typical market town of rural England at that time.

The concrete model, built at 1/10 scale, features 120 buildings including 108 shop fronts and a 15 ft (5m) high Minster. The shop windows accurately show the goods the shops were selling in the post war years.

Originally built on a site just to the north-west of the actual Wimborne Minster church, it became run-down in the 1980s, and a group of volunteers set up a charity and were given an area of 0.4 hectare (1 acre) of Green Belt land off King Street to restore the attraction. Although such use of Green Belt land would normally have been deemed inappropriate development, the District planners considered that the model's retention in the town was a 'special circumstance'. The council has since permitted over 245 square metres of temporary classroom buildings incorporating a visitors centre, cafe/gift shop, toilets etc. together with play cabins associated with the children's play area.

Additional attractions have been added in recent years, including a model railway based on Thomas the Tank Engine, which was opened by Christopher Awdry.

Today the model town is still run by volunteers, and is visited by thousands of people every year.

== Gallery ==
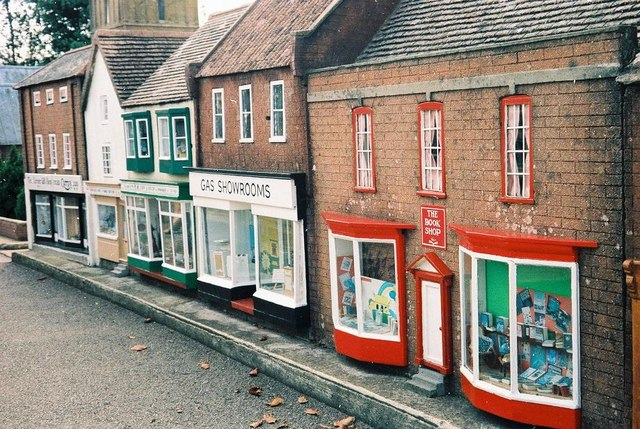
High Street

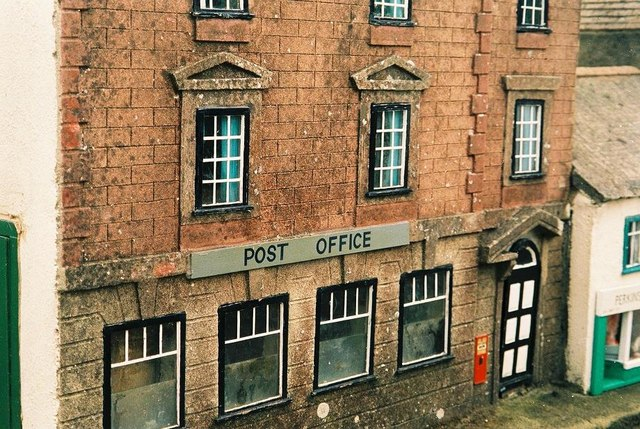
Post office on East Street

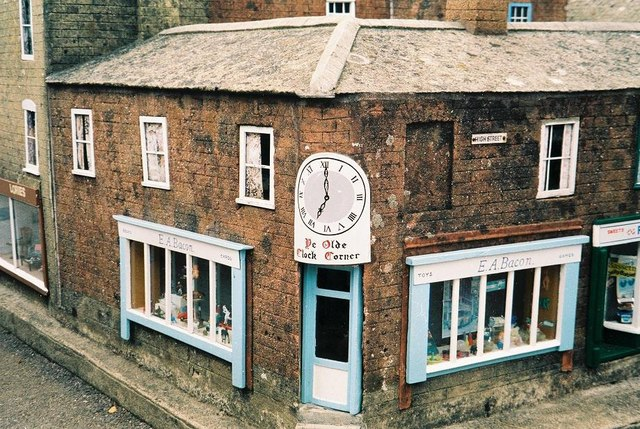
Clock Corner

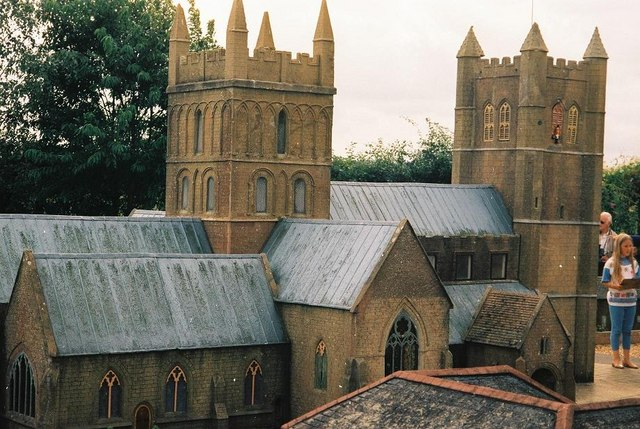
Wimborne Minster from the north

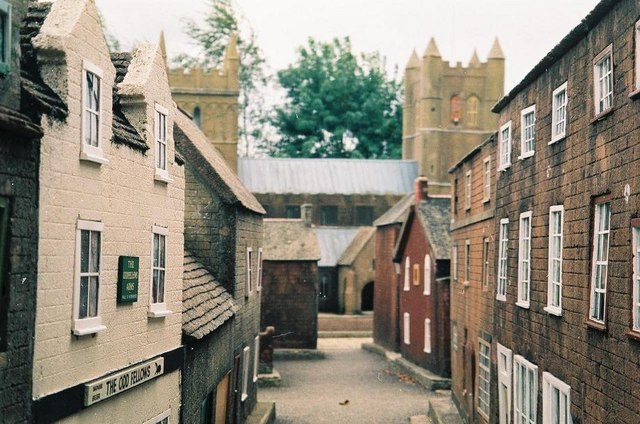
Church Street

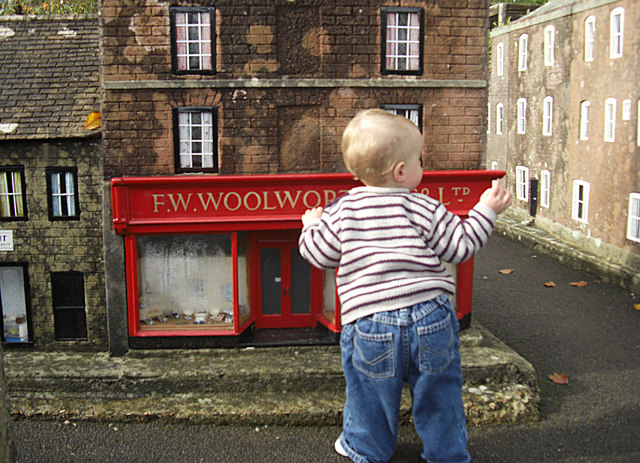
Woolworths
