= Tiny Town (miniature park) =

Model of a city built in Springfield, Missouri

Coordinates: 37.224°N 93.300°W

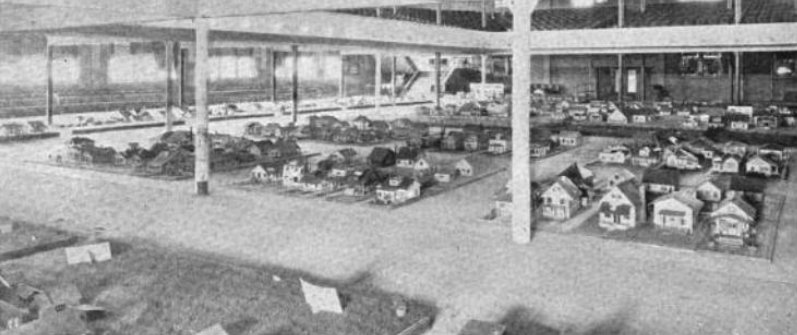
1919 Tiny Town displayed at Springfield Convention Center

Tiny Town, in Springfield, Missouri, was the first city built in miniature and had over a thousand structures. A smaller village version was completed in 1919, while the larger full version was completed in 1925. It was motivated primarily by a local homebuilding promotion. The project involved 10,000 students from the eighteen public schools in Springfield. The superintendent of the school system was a key instigator of the project and used it as a teaching aid to instruct students in government, home-ownership and citizenship.

== Background ==
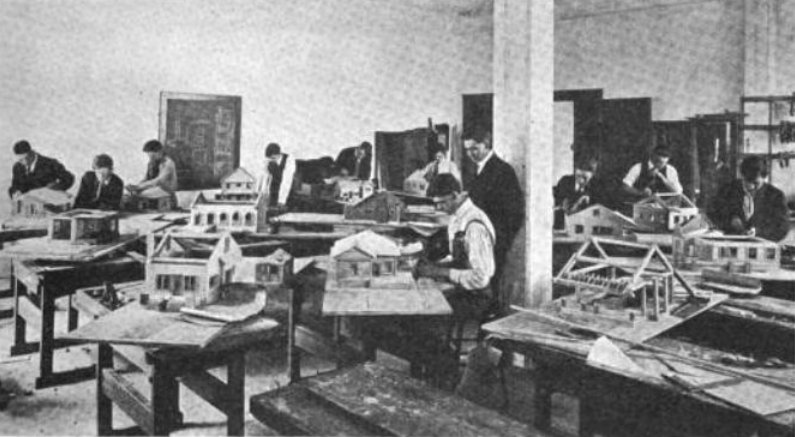
Construction by students

Tiny Town was the first complete city built in miniature. The project's primary motivation was "Build Now," a promotion originated by the local director of publicity W. H. Johnson to stimulate Springfield's home-construction industry. Tiny Town, a 1920s community-involvement project and miniature park, was produced by the Springfield director of publicity and the chamber of commerce. A village version, consisting of about 400 houses and 250 garages, was first exhibited on the basement floor of the Springfield convention center in 1919. It was built by teenagers, who scaled Tiny Town at one-half inch to the foot (1:24). The complete miniature city was built in 1925 in a city park, with 1,000 houses and about 200 other structures (including garages, apartments, and public buildings). It encompassed every aspect of an early-20th-century city.

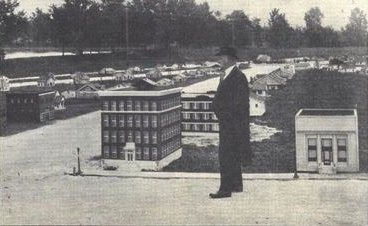
W. H. Johnson by structures

W. W. Thomas, superintendent of the Springfield public-school system, believed that home-ownership and citizenship responsibilities were a part of education and was a key instigator of the project. He involved students in the governmental duties associated with the project, which used the manager-commission form of government to run the lilliputian city. Concepts such as women’s suffrage and political ambition came into play. A 14-year-old orphaned girl was elected Tiny Town's mayor and a 15-year-old boy became its city manager, defeating sixteen other nominees in a political campaign.

== Description ==
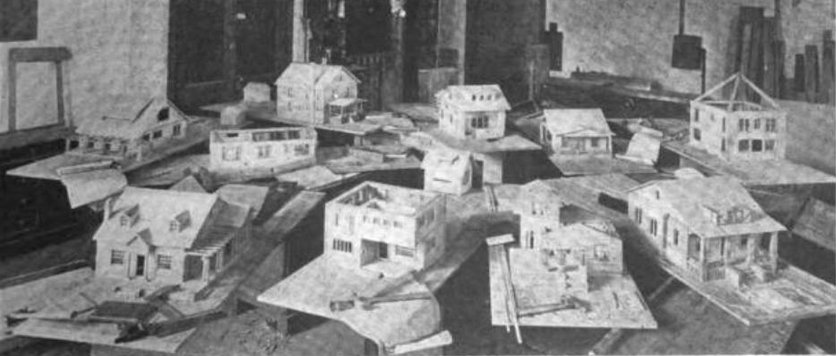
Houses under construction

The miniature city project involved students from Springfield's eighteen public schools. The students, who were learning construction and handicraft, built the city of about 1,200 structures under the supervision of their teachers. It consisted of 1,000 miniature houses, in several neighborhoods, and 200 other structures. The miniature buildings and houses were built according to standard construction plans, and lumber and building-materials companies donated items for the project. The buildings and homes were landscaped with real grass. Their interiors were furnished and decorated like a full-sized house or building. The buildings were scaled at one-half inch to the foot. Tiny Town, with water mains and electric lights, was laid out on streets like a real city.

Students of the vocational-training departments of Springfield's public schools constructed the miniature city buildings. Much of the smaller work done by the students was done at home to involve their parents. Ideas introduced to the students were how to be a citizen of a community, home ownership and the infrastructure of city design. Ten thousand students built the outdoor miniature city over a ten-week period. Tiny Town, assembled on a five-acre city parcel, was 1,000 feet long and 250 feet wide—250,000 square feet (23,000 m^{2})—representing 155 acres (63 ha) of real land. The miniature city had 7,500 feet (2,300 m) of paths through neighborhoods containing houses, schools, churches, libraries, stores, apartments, and government buildings.

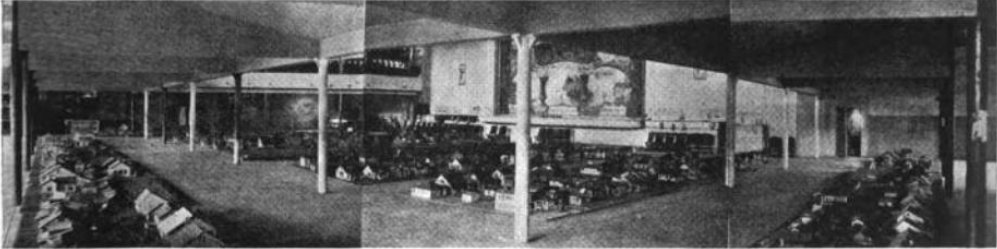
Preliminary convention-center exhibit, showing Tiny Town's neighborhoods

== Prizes ==
Prizes were awarded for the best structures, the best art posters, and the best cutout books made by students about Tiny Town. The prizes were available only to vocational-training students and students otherwise involved in the project. Student officials were in charge during the awards at the Springfield convention center. The carpentry of the framing and exterior of the homes was done primarily by the boys. The supervisor of the art department of the participating schools had an interior home-decoration contest to involve the girls, who made draperies, furniture, and floor coverings and beautified the homes' interiors.

== Outcome ==
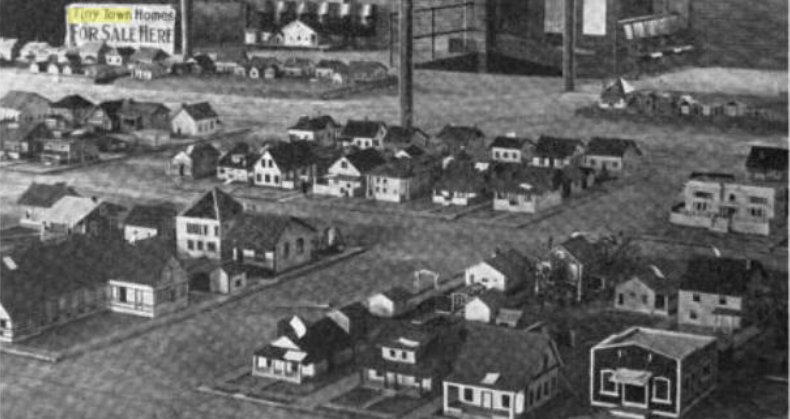
Tiny Town homes for sale

Tiny Town was finished and available for public viewing on May 25, 1925. The event was covered by newspapers throughout the United States. A 7-by-8.5-inch (18 by 22 cm) Tiny Town Times newspaper, explaining the events and exhibits, was published daily during the exposition and distributed to other towns. The students reported scoops such as the names of Tiny Town's streets.

The exhibit of miniature houses at Grant Beach Park in Springfield had an admission charge. It was open to the public for three weeks, until June 13, and discounted children's tickets were available at businesses throughout the city. Many individuals and businesses in Springfield donated money to the project.

The Build Now promotion and the Tiny Town project substantially increased homebuilding in Springfield. When the exhibition was over, many of the tiny homes were sold and the prize-winning structures were used as window displays in Springfield's major stores. The Tiny Town committee unsuccessfully petitioned the United States Post Office to appoint a "postmaster" and obtain a mailing address for the miniature city during the exposition. Before the Tiny Town exhibition opened, it was announced that a group of "officials" from the miniature city would go to Washington, D.C. to invite President Calvin Coolidge to visit; although people from all over the United States came to see the exhibit, Coolidge did not.

== Prize-winning models ==
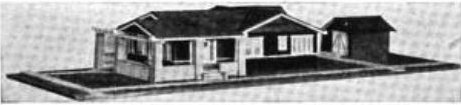

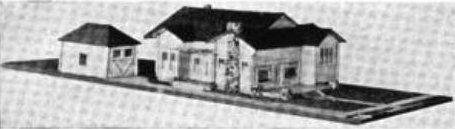

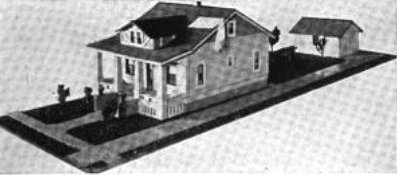

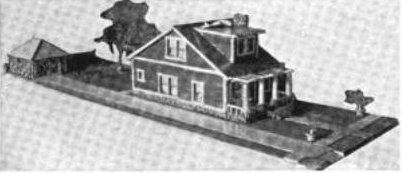

== Sources ==
- American Architect (1919). The American Architect. Architectural & Building Press, Incorporated.
- Advertising & Selling (1919). Advertising & Selling. Advertising & Selling Company, Incorporated.
- American Builder (1919). American Builder. American Carpenter and Builder Company.
- American Lumberman (1919). American Lumberman. American Lumberman.
- Bonnier Corporation (December 1925). Popular Science. Bonnier Corporation.
- Thomas, W. W. (1919). "Build "Tiny Town". as a Civic and Industrial Arts Problem". Industrial Arts. Bruce Publishing Company.
- Christian Register (1919). Christian Register.
- City Manager (1925). City Manager Magazine. City Managers' Assn.
- Constructive Philanthropy (1919). Constructive Philanthropy Journal. Charity Organization Society of the City of New York.
- Education Journal (1919). Journal of Education. Boston University, School of Education.
- Grant, Arthur (1919). The American City. Buttenheim Publishing Corporation.
- Johnson, W. H. (1919). The American Architect. Architectural & Building Press, Incorporated.
- Kane, Joseph Nathan (1935). More First Facts. H. W. Wilson Company. "... of one inch equals one foot, in Grant Beach Park, Springfield, Mo. construction beginning June 6, 1925. Ten thousand school children helped in building Tiny Town which has 1,200 miniature structures, covering every angle of a modern city."
- Kane, Joseph Nathan (1997). Famous First Facts, Fifth Edition. The H. W. Wilson Company. Item 2197, page 132. ISBN 0-8242-0930-3. "The first city in miniature was Tiny Town, in Grant Beach Park, Springfield, MO. It was built on June 6, 1925, by 10,000 children under the direction of William H. Johnson, on a carefully prepared townsite of five acres, with avenues, electric lights, and water mains, all to a scale of one inch to one foot. The town had 1,200 miniature structures, covering every aspect of a modern city. Schoolchildren served as the officers of the town, which had the manager-commission form of government. Conceived and constructed as an incentive to building, Tiny Town boosted building permits in Springfield from a $280 daily average for the 90 days preceding its exhibition to $1,843 per day for the 90 days immediately following. Six years before the townsite was selected, a miniature village was exhibited by Johnson on the floor of the convention hall in Springfield."
- Kriechbaum (1924). The Lumber Manufacturer and Dealer. Kriechbaum Publishing Company.
- Leighton, Etta V. (1919). Primary Education. Educational Publishing Company.
- Plank, Louis (1919). Town & County Edition of The American City. Civic Press.
- Shiras, Tom (1919). Industrial Development Record. Publications Division, Conway Research, Incorporated.
