= France Miniature =

Miniature park in Élancourt, France

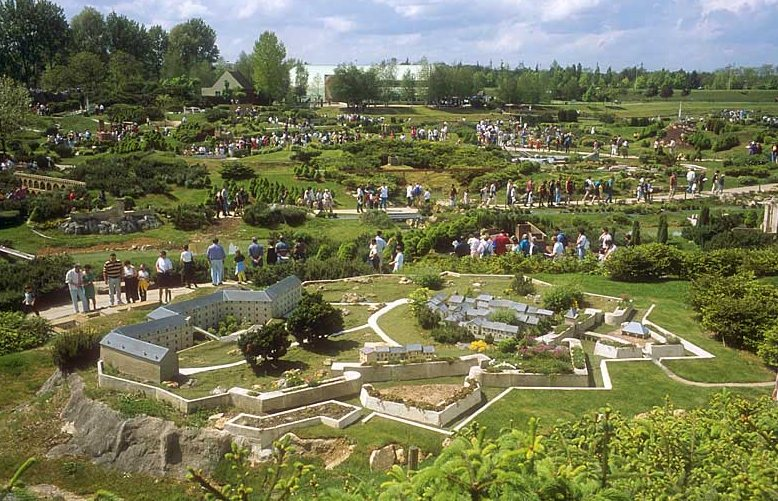
- France Miniature, seen from the eastern side of the park.
- Interactive map of France Miniature
- Location: Élancourt, France
- Coordinates: 48°46′35″N 1°57′44″E
- Status: Operating
- Opened: 1991; 35 years ago
- Area: 12 acres (4.9 ha)

France Miniature (French pronunciation: [fʁɑ̃s minjatyʁ]) is a miniature park tourist attraction in Élancourt, France featuring scale models of major French landmarks and monuments in an outdoor park.

== Description ==
France Miniature is a 5-hectare (12-acre) outdoor park in the shape of France that contains about 160 outdoor 1/30-scale models of major French monuments and landmarks. Monuments are placed in the park to correlate approximately with their real-world locations in France. Many of the models are animated, and all of the country's best known landmarks are represented (the Eiffel Tower, Versailles, Lourdes, etc.). A system of model trains runs through the park, and animated boats ply the "Atlantic Ocean" and the "Mediterranean Sea" (lagoons positioned appropriately around the perimeter of the park). Visitors walk along paved paths to visit the various models.

An indoor exhibition features extremely detailed models of several indoor scenes.

The park is closed during the winter.

France Miniature is owned by the same group (Grévin & Cie., now part of Compagnie des Alpes) that operates the Parc Astérix amusement park north of Paris.
