= Kyiv in Miniature =

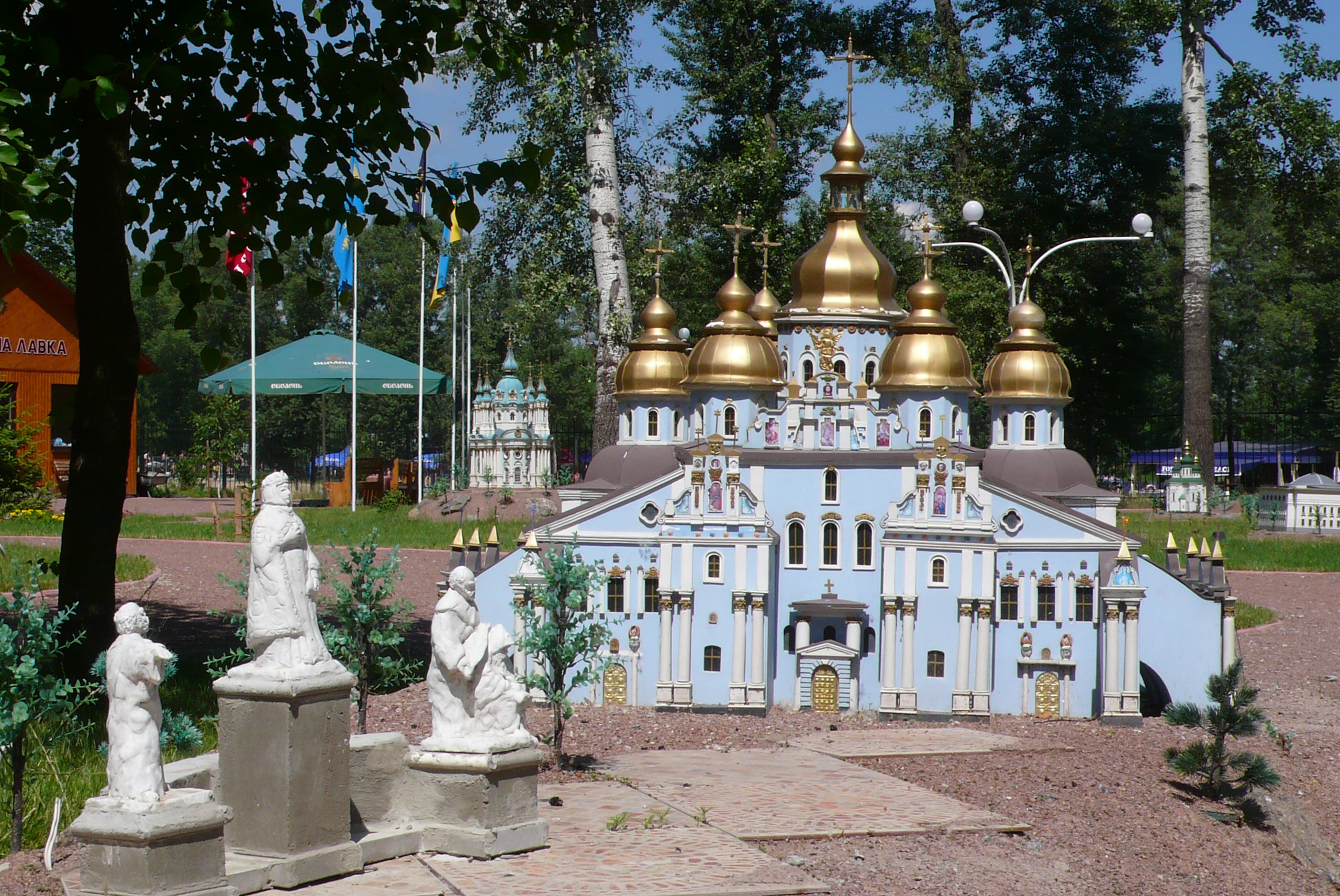
- Location: Kyiv, Ukraine
- Coordinates: 50°26′57″N 30°34′49″E
- Opened: June 23, 2006

Kyiv in Miniature (Ukrainian: Київ в мініатюрі) is a park of miniatures, situated in Kyiv in the area of Hydropark. There are exposed models of Kyiv architectural sightseeings, in the scale of 1:33. The park's area is 1.8 hectares (4.4 acres). It was opened on 23 June 2006, the closest metro station to it is Hydropark.

== Miniatures ==
There are 48 miniatures in the park, including Independence Square and Khreschatyk, Kyiv Pechersk Lavra, St. Michael's Golden-Domed Monastery, Golden Gates, Saint Sophia Cathedral, Mother Motherland Monument, Kyiv Passenger Railway Station, Boryspil Airport and others.

== Gallery ==
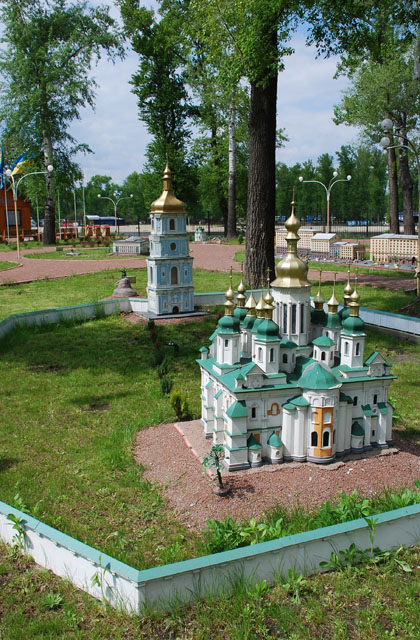
Saint Sophia Cathedrall

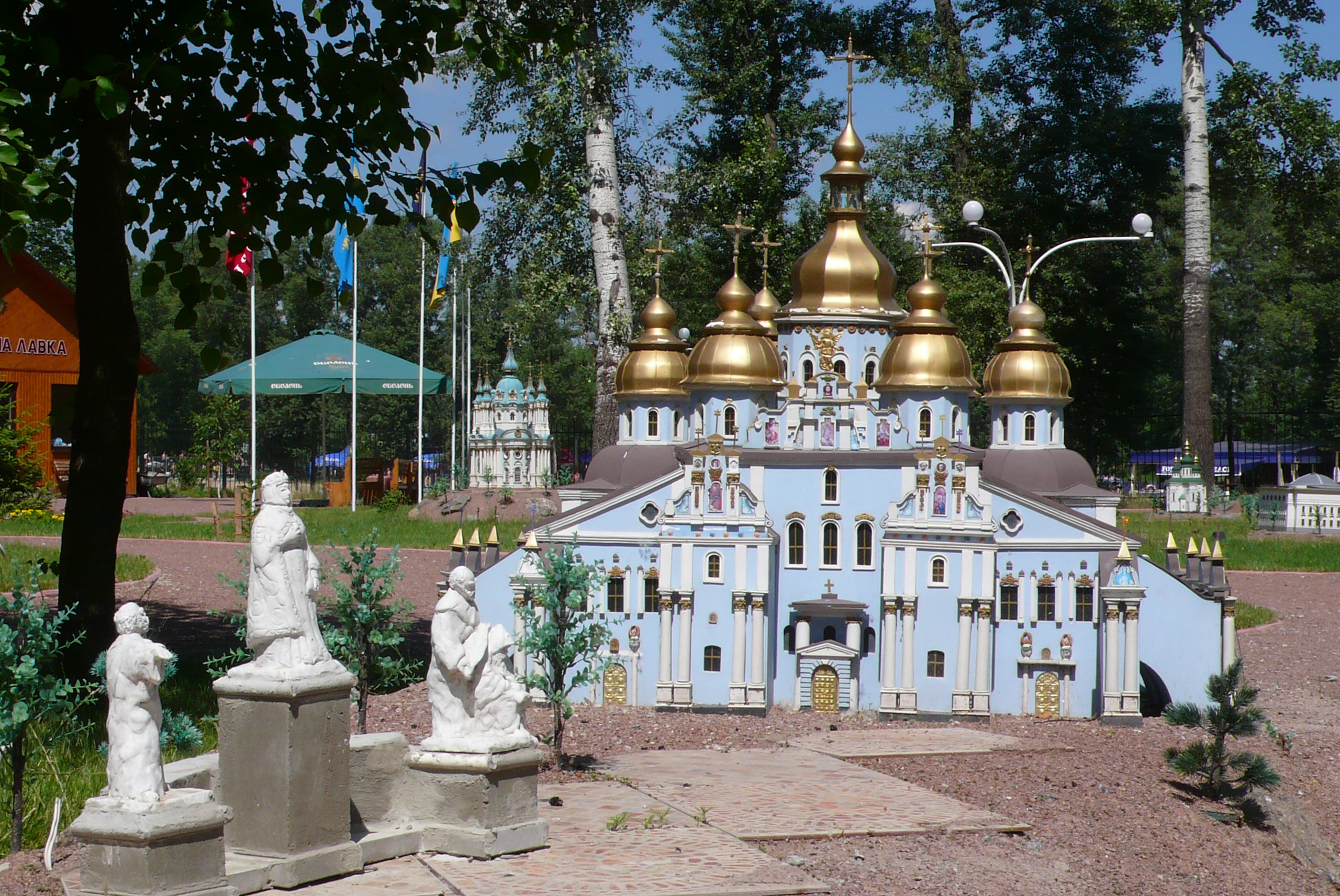
St. Michael's Golden-Domed Monastery including Monument to princess Olga

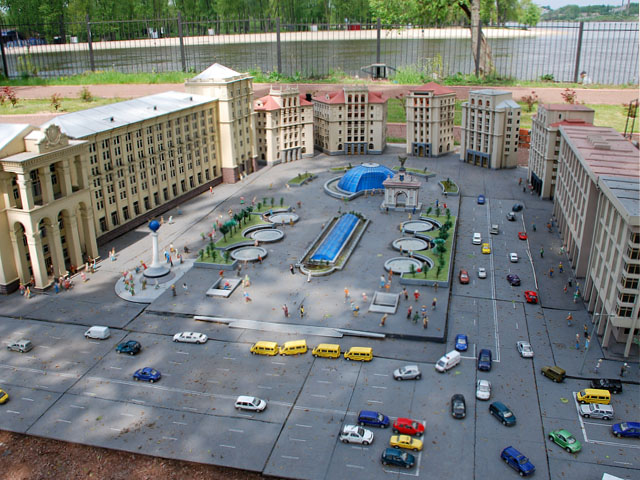
Independence square

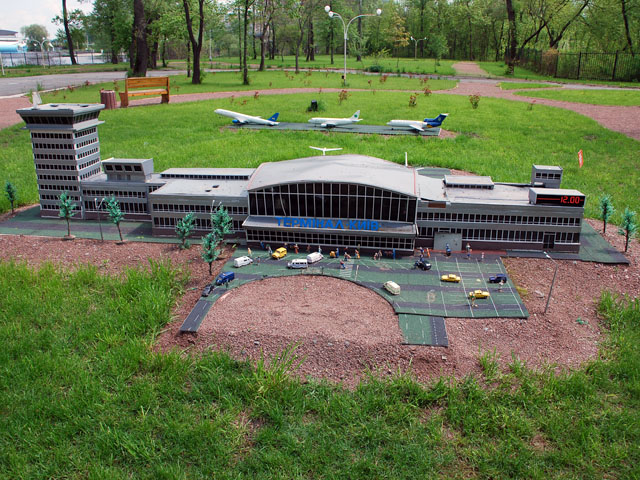
Boryspil airport

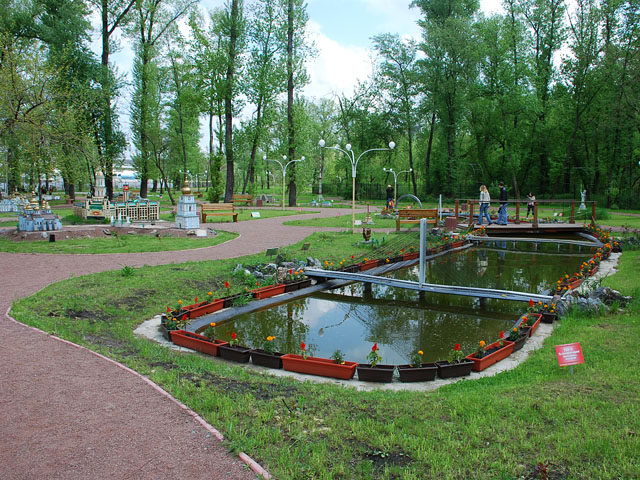
Bridges
