= Babbacombe Model Village =

Miniature village and railway

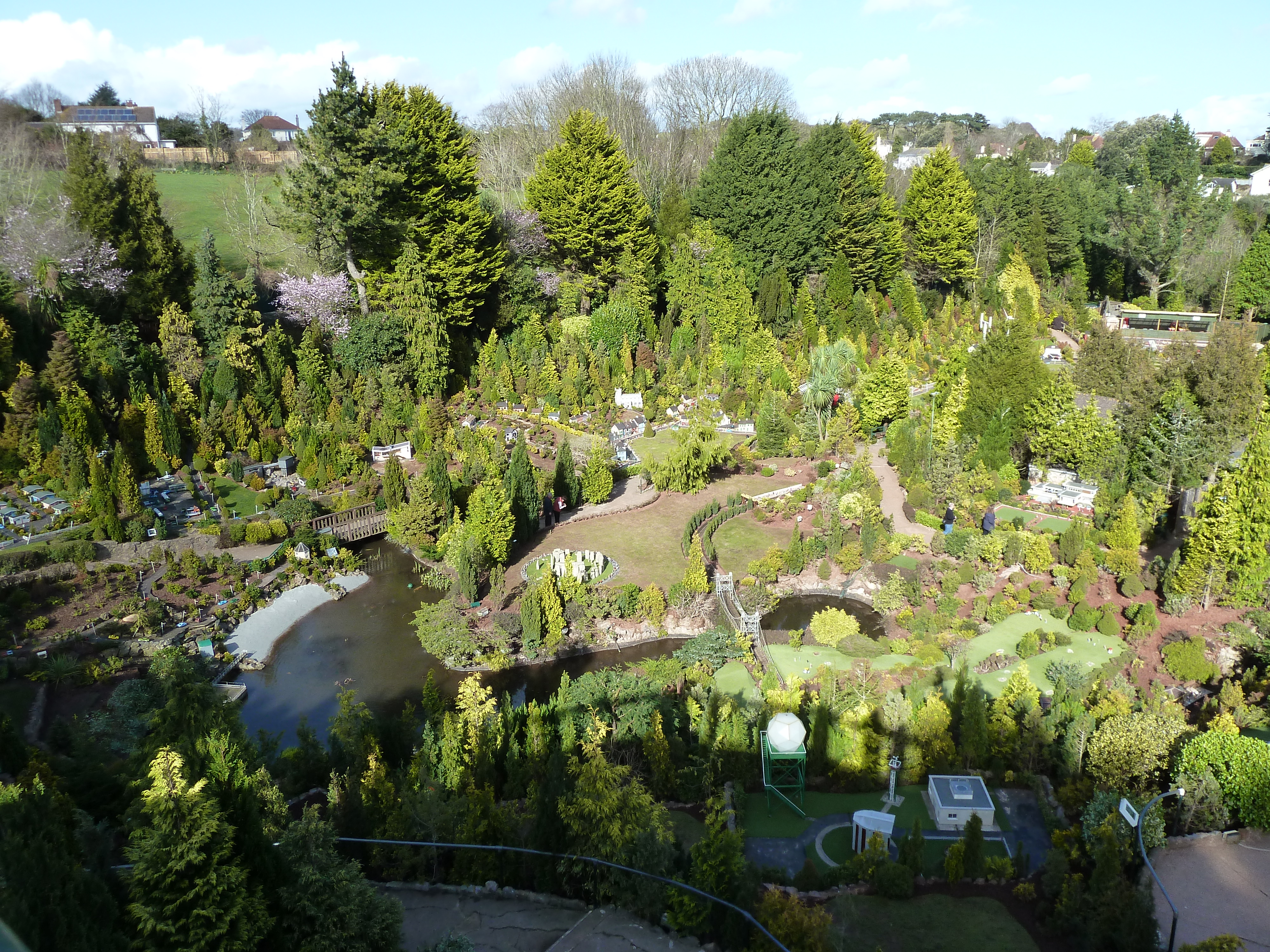
- The Model Village, as seen in 2012

- Location within Devon

General information
- Type: Miniature Village
- Location: Hampton Avenue; Babbacombe; Torquay; Devon; TQ1 3LA
- Coordinates: 50.482705°N 3.520458°W
- Construction started: 12 April 1963
- Opening: 12 April 1963; 62 years ago

Technical details
- Floor area: 4 acres (1.6 ha)

Website
- Official Website

Babbacombe Model Village is the UK's largest miniature village located in Babbacombe in Torquay, Devon.

The Model Village offers extensive award-winning gardens, set in a beautiful valley, showcasing hundreds of hand-crafted models and scenes. It was opened on 12 April 1963 by Tom & Ruth Dobbins, who had previously opened another model village at Southport in 1957.

== Miniature landscape ==
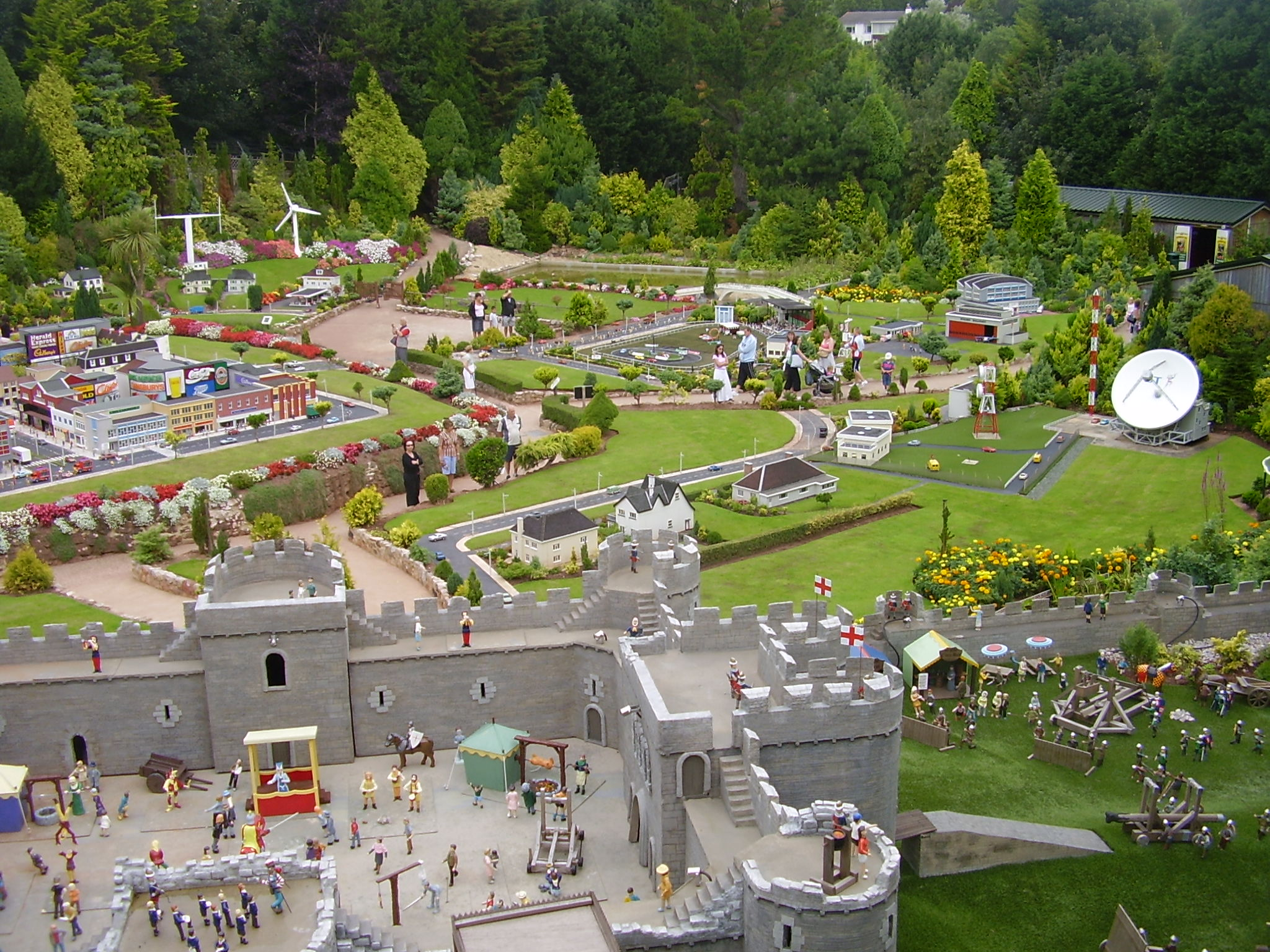
The Model Village

Babbacombe Model Village is set in award-winning gardens that were created in a beautiful valley. It showcases hundreds of unique hand-crafted models and scenes, with lots of puns and humour. The site is set on approximately 4 acres (1.6 ha). There are over 400 models along with 1,000 ft (300 m) of model train track in the village and over 13,000 miniature residents. The models are mostly a humorous and generic portrayal of Britain through the decades, though there are some well-known landmarks too, such as Stonehenge.

Names of shops and other features include humorous puns, such as Marks and Sparks, Woolies, Amanda Lofe - Home Baked Bread & Cakes. A. Kingbody Sports Centre ('Aching Body') and Terry Bull Gardening Service, and many more

== Popular models ==
Some of the popular models at the village include the burning house, Stonehenge, the cityscape, the EastEnders indoor scene, the Mythical Kingdom and the fire-breathing dragon.

== Media ==
The model village appeared in an episode of Holiday of My Lifetime in 2014 with Len Goodman and Matt Allwright. It also appeared on The One Show in the same year. In 2019, the model village was used as a filming location for Don’t Forget the Driver.

== Illuminations ==
During the summer months and for Halloween & Christmas, the Babbacombe Model Village is open on select evenings for illuminations.

== 30 Years ago Of Babbacombe Model Village ==
- 30 Years ago Of Babbacombe Model Village (1993)

== Babbacombe Model Village '95 ==
- Babbacombe Model Village '95 (1995)
