= Tivoli Miniature World =

Defunct theme park

Tivoli Miniature World was a theme park devoted to displaying 1/50 scale miniature fibreglass replicas of over 75 famous buildings from around the world.

It was originally opened in 1977 in Jordan, Ontario before relocating to Niagara Falls, Ontario in the early 1990s. The park eventually went bankrupt.

== History ==
=== Canadia Miniturama ===
Impetus of the park was another nearby short-lived attraction called Canadia which was an eleven-acre miniature village and horticultural park in Niagara Falls. The all-Canadian themed landscapes and landmark building models were at a 1:24 scale. When it opened in May 1966, it was the largest such collection of large scale miniature buildings in the world. The models were made of wood structure with a thin exterior of mixed media for the details.

In 1970, the park closed to make way for a shopping plaza that never gained city approval, with the property eventually being turned into a housing development. For years, the Canadia Group looked for suitable locations to reconstruct the park. Only about 25 buildings were saved, and kept in storage. In 1979 two of the models, Casa Loma the Parliament buildings, were put on temporary display at Tivoli. The problem was scale, Tivoli was designed in 1:50 scale, so the Canadia park models were too large to match.

=== The Opening of Tivoli ===
Tivoli opened at Prudhomme's Landing on Lake Ontario on a 10-acre site. The park included fibre-glass models of the Colosseum, the Eiffel Tower, Taj Mahal and Mount Rushmore

Tivoli later moved to Victoria Avenue in Niagara Falls. It closed in 1995 with the models being sold to a company in Sao Paulo. Brazil.
