= Bourton-on-the-Water model village =

Scale model village in Gloucestershire, England

Coordinates: 51°53′01″N 1°45′19″W

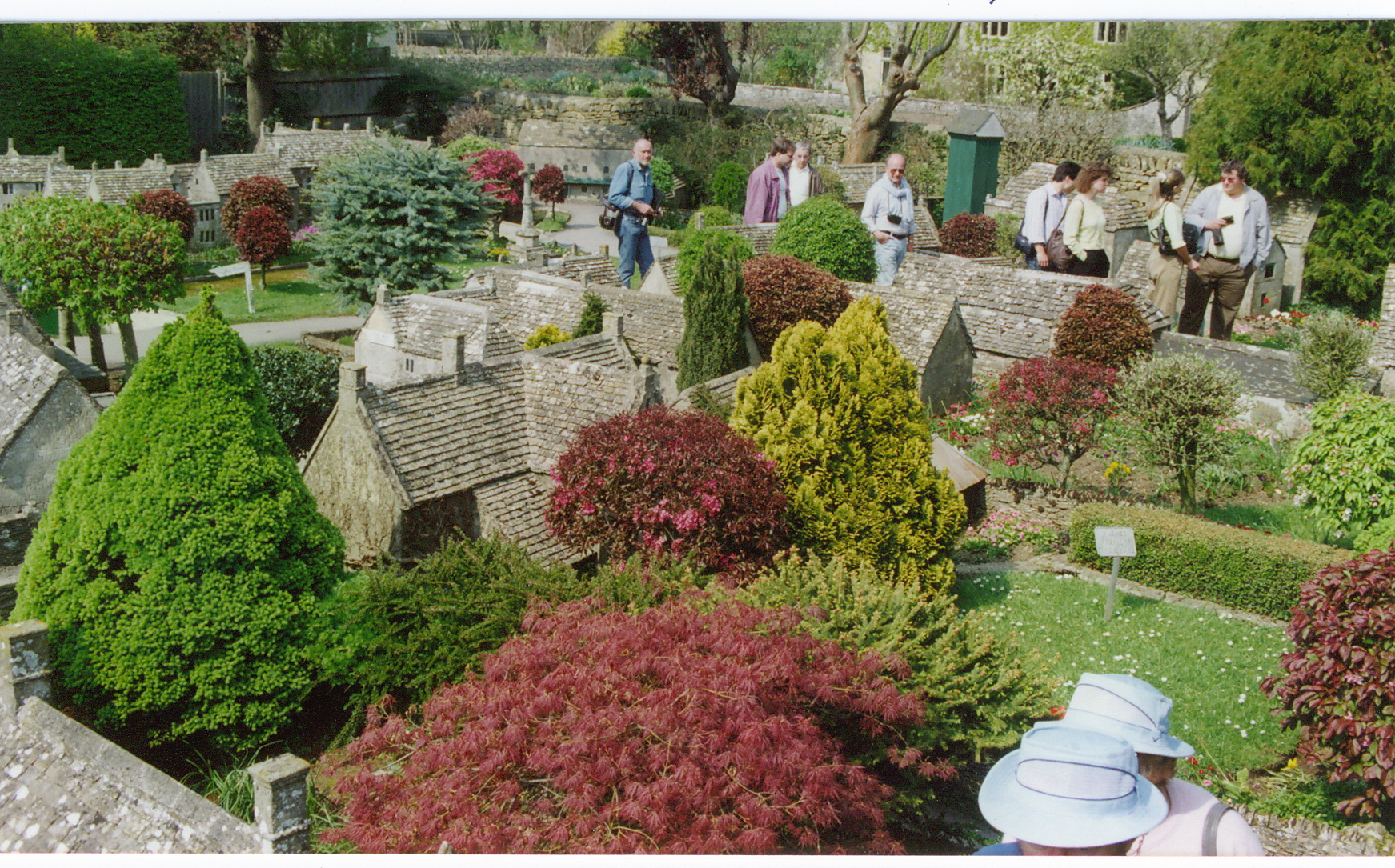
Part of the village with visitors walking on the streets

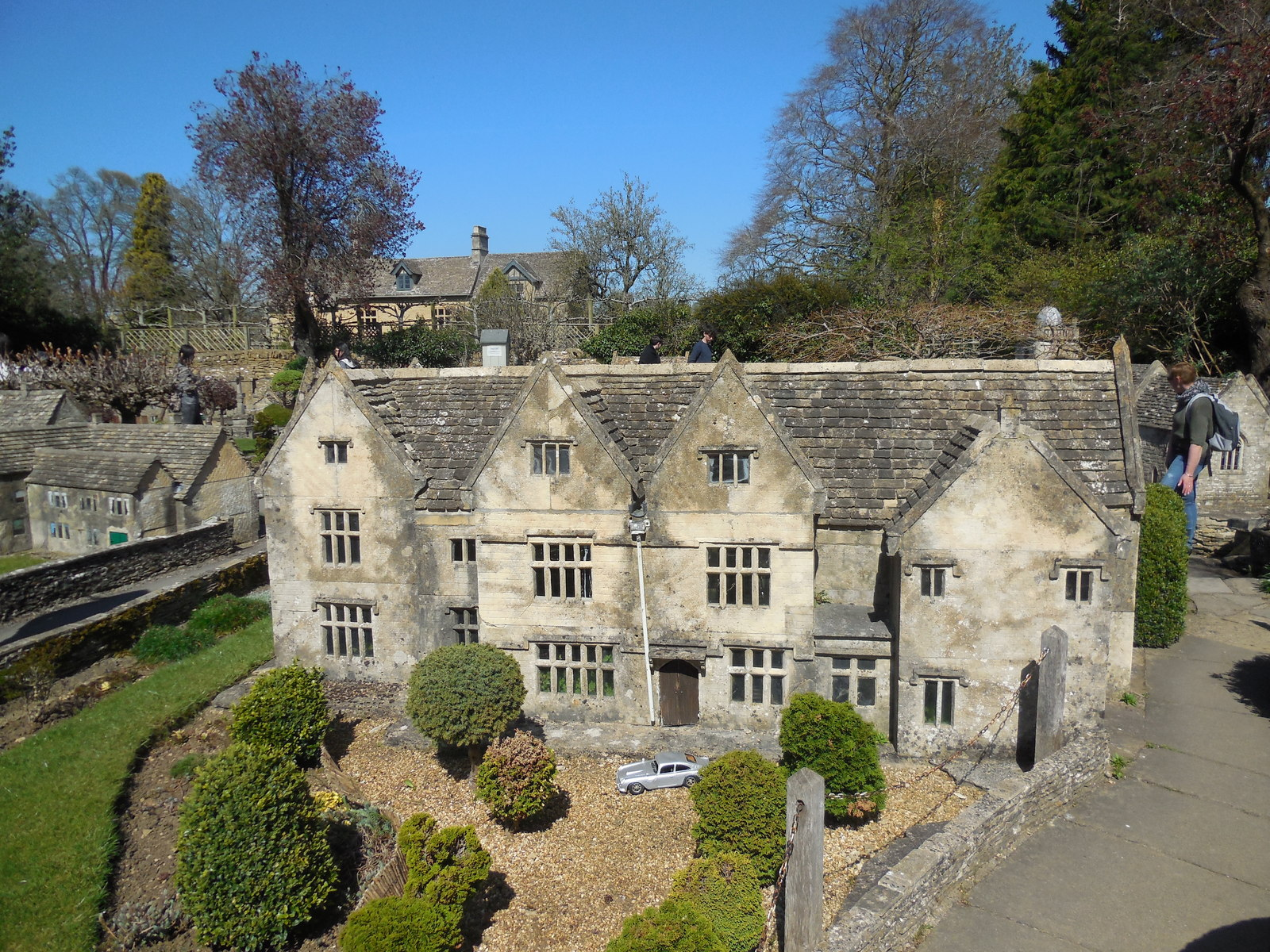
Model of the Manor

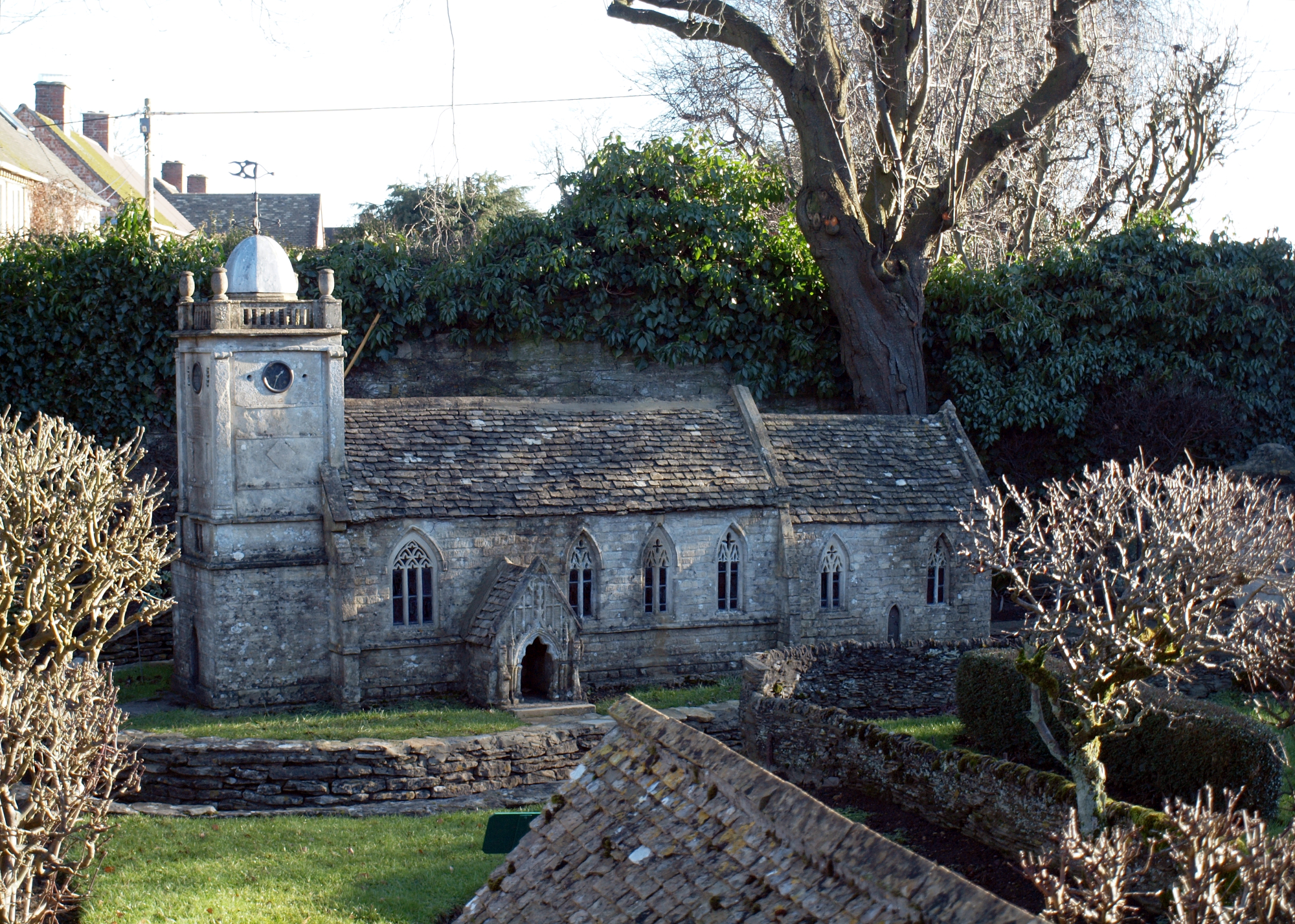
Model of St Lawrence's Church

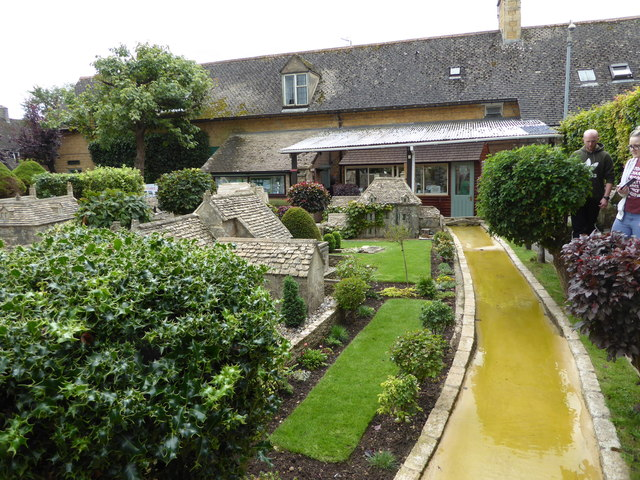
View of the model's River Windrush

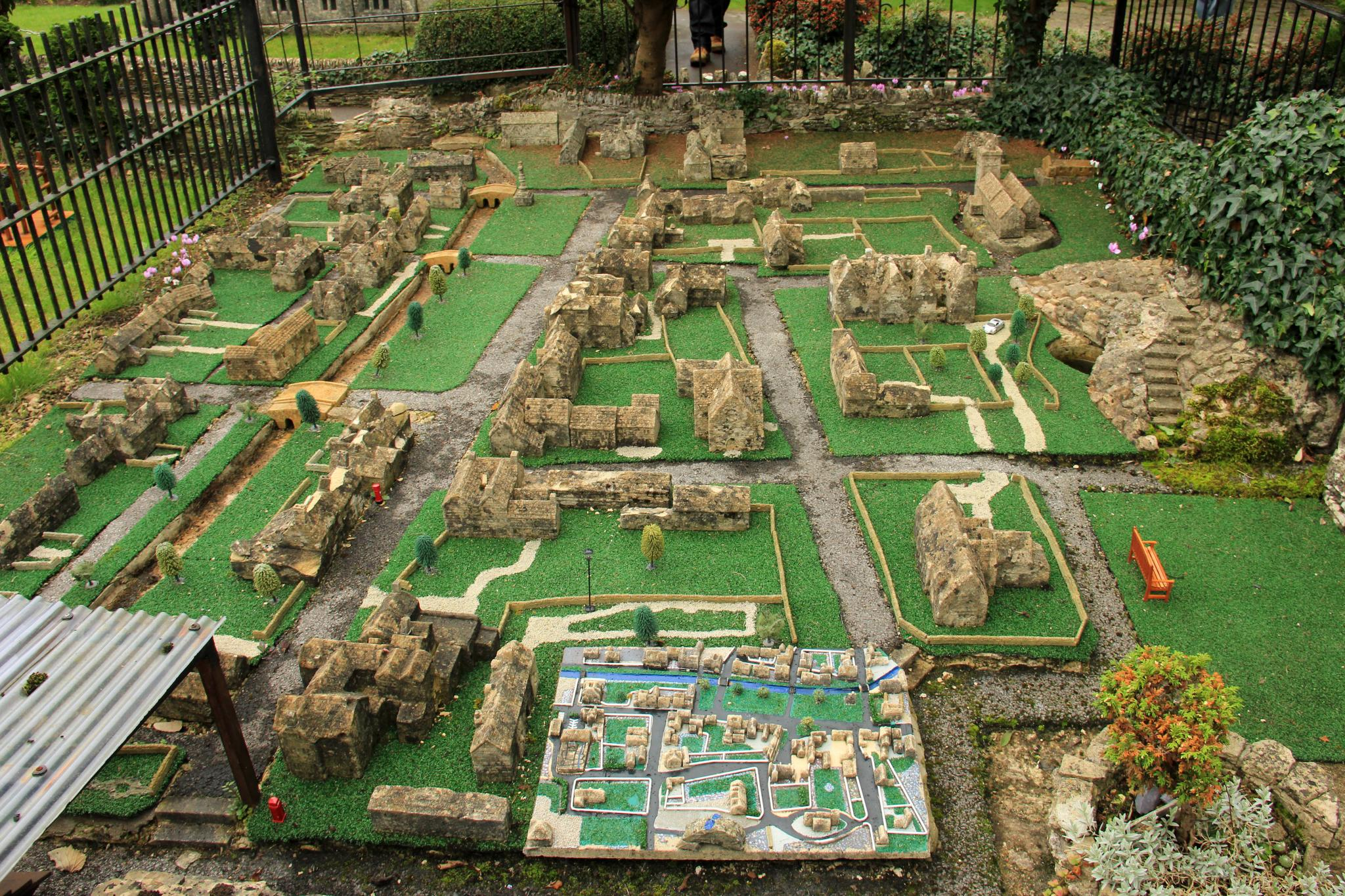
The scale model of the model village, within which is a further scale model of itself

Bourton-on-the-Water model village is a scale model village in the grounds of the Old New Inn in Bourton-on-the-Water, Gloucestershire, England. One of the first model villages in the country, it was started in 1936 and completed in 1940. The model represents the core of Bourton-on-the-Water as it appeared in 1936 in 1:9 scale, rotated 90° in orientation from the actual village it is in. The model village contains around 100 buildings. It is open to the public and includes exhibitions of other models on smaller scales.

== Background ==
The Bourton-on-the-Water model village was one of the first to be built in England, being completed between 1936 and 1940. Possibly the only earlier example is the Bekonscot model village in Beaconsfield, Buckinghamshire, which is the oldest in the world, being begun in 1929, though not finished until the later 20th century. Bourton-on-the-Water was a fledgling tourist destination in the early 20th century and the landlord of the New Inn, Mr C A Morris, decided to build the model village to attract motorists to his public house. Morris had originally intended to convert the pub's vegetable garden into a village green with a stream with a waterfall and scale replicas of the arch bridges in the village. He soon decided to instead construct a 1:9 scale model of the entire village.

== Construction ==
Morris and his wife carefully measured each building in the village and commissioned eight local craftsmen to construct scale replicas of around 100 structures. The craftsmen were construction workers rather than model makers so the methods used were scaled down versions of those used to construct real buildings. The walls are made from ashlars of local limestone, carefully cut to minimise joints and engraved to depict smaller courses of stone. The roofs are covered with slates of Cotswold stone from the Huntsman's Quarry located 3 miles (4.8 km) from the village. The drystone walls are real and have cock and hen or flatstone copings to correspond with the real walls in the village. Two of the buildings have full interiors, visible through perspex panels in their walls: the Church of England parish church of St Lawrence and the village's Baptist chapel. The church has intricate tracery windows and the windows on the models are glazed with real glass. The model village includes examples of 17th- to 19th-century Cotswold architecture. A recording of hymns being sung is played from the village's churches. The roads include model benches and post boxes. Miniature shrubs, including some bonsai trees planted in the 1930s, and pruned real trees represent the trees and bushes of the full-size village and alpine plants the flowers.

The model village covers the core of the historic village stretching from the Old Mill (now home to the Cotswold Motoring Museum) to the New Inn (which is now known as the Old New Inn). This includes High Street, Station Road, Moore Road, Victoria Street and Sherborne Street. The only building not shown in its correct relative position is St Lawrence's church, which would otherwise fall outside of the area covered. A running stream stands in for the River Windrush.

The model village includes a scale model of the model village (which would be at 1:81 scale). This model, in turn, contains a scale model of the model of the model village; being at 1:729 scale this measures around 1 foot (30 cm) in width. This model also contains a scale model (in paint only) of the model of the model of the model village (which would be at 1:6561 scale). Because of the 90° rotation of the model village relative to the actual village, each level of scale model is also rotated a further 90°.

== Operation ==
The model village opened to the public on 13 May 1937, as part of the celebrations for the coronation of George VI. The model village was the first tourist attraction in Bourton-on-the-Water; the village has since become one of the main tourist destinations in the Cotswolds. Construction of the models continued until 1940. No significant changes to the architecture have been made since, so the model village preserves Bourton-on-the-Water as it was in 1936, except that shop logos and window displays are updated to reflect changing occupants.

The Morris family maintained and operated the site until 1999 when the model village and the Old New Inn were sold to Julian and Vicki Atherton. In 2004 they purchased a collection of 30 miniature scenes that had been on display in a shop in the village; these form a separate exhibition. The model village became a grade II listed building on 22 March 2013, receiving the same protection as the early 18th-century Old New Inn, which was listed in 1983. In 2014 the Athertons bought a collection of seven 1:32 scale model buildings. These had been built by John Constable in Somerset, part funded by philanthropist Sir Paul Getty. They included a representation of Willy Lott's Cottage, the building depicted in John Constable's The Hay Wain. The collection, out of scale with the model village, were opened as a separate exhibition at the site. In 2016 when renovations were made to the roof of the St Lawrence's Church model, a penny dated 1937 was recovered, which is believed to indicate the date of its construction.

During the Athertons' ownership the village attracted around 100,000 visitors per year and was open every day except Christmas Day. The buildings remain outdoors all year round, while some model villages close in the winter when the models are put into storage. The Athertons employed a full time stone mason to repair damage caused by frost as well as three other employees to repaint the models and maintain the trees and bushes.

In April 2018 the Old New Inn and model village were put up for sale as the Athertons retired. The pub and model village were purchased by Andrew and Julie Lund-Yates, who had lived in the area for 25 years.

== See also ==
- Droste effect known in art as an example of mise en abyme
