= Boundless by CSMA =

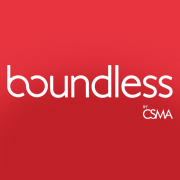
- Type: Company limited by guarantee
- Industry: Members club
- Founded: United Kingdom (1923)
- Founder: Frank Vernon Edwards
- Headquarters: Brighton, England
- Products: Discounts, Leisure Retreats, Magazine, Events, Groups
- Services: Member benefits, offers, discounts, holidays and activities
- Website: www.boundless.co.uk

Boundless by CSMA (formerly CSMA Club and previously the Civil Service Motoring Association) is an experiences club that helps public sector workers get the most from their free time. Established in 1923 (when it was the Civil Service Motoring Club), it is open to past and present members of the UK Civil Service and public sector plus organisations that were formerly part of the British Civil Service, for instance Royal Mail and BT. Relatives of existing members may also join.

== History ==
Boundless by CSMA is a mutual organisation. It was founded as the Civil Service Motoring Association in 1923 by Frank Vernon Edwards, an executive officer in the Ministry of Labour who had an interest in motorcycle trials.

== Services ==
Originally concentrating on the sporting and leisure activities associated with motoring, Boundless by CSMA has developed into primarily a provider of membership benefits in motoring, lifestyle and leisure areas. Today its member benefits include discounts on insurance, shopping, holidays, banking, attraction tickets, cinema, travel, leisure and roadside rescue, providing these through relationships with Approved Partners, notably LV= Insurance, with which it has worked since 1923.

Members of the club also have access to a range of clubs and groups focusing on hobbies and interests from classic cars to photography, as well as a range of events throughout the UK.

== Britannia Rescue ==
CSMA Club formerly owned and operated a vehicle breakdown rescue service for members and the general public, branded Britannia Rescue. In 2007, CSMA sold Britannia Rescue to Liverpool Victoria, the owner of the Frizzell Insurance brand (now known as LV=).

== Boundless Breaks – hotels, cottages, leisure parks ==
Boundless by CSMA owns and operates a number of "Holiday and Leisure properties" in the UK. These currently include

- Cotswold Cottages, self-catering cottages in Gloucestershire
- Whitemead Forest Park, a holiday park in Parkend, Forest of Dean.
- Bournemouth West Cliff Hotel in Bournemouth

Although the general public can stay at any of the properties, members and their families and guests receive a considerable discount on tariffs.

The Ghyll Manor hotel was sold in 2022.

== Cotswold Motoring Museum ==
Boundless by CSMA is owner of the Cotswold Motoring Museum in Bourton-on-the-Water, Gloucestershire.

== Magazine ==
The club magazine, called Boundless, was formerly known as Club Life and before that Motoring & Leisure. It is the largest circulated motoring magazine in the UK. The magazine used to be distributed to members who paid a subscription. From 2009 the magazine is included in the yearly membership fee and distributed to all members 6 times a year. The magazine covers a range of topics from holidays and leisure to motoring and reviews.
