= Mark Powlett =

Mark Powlett BA (Hons) HPD
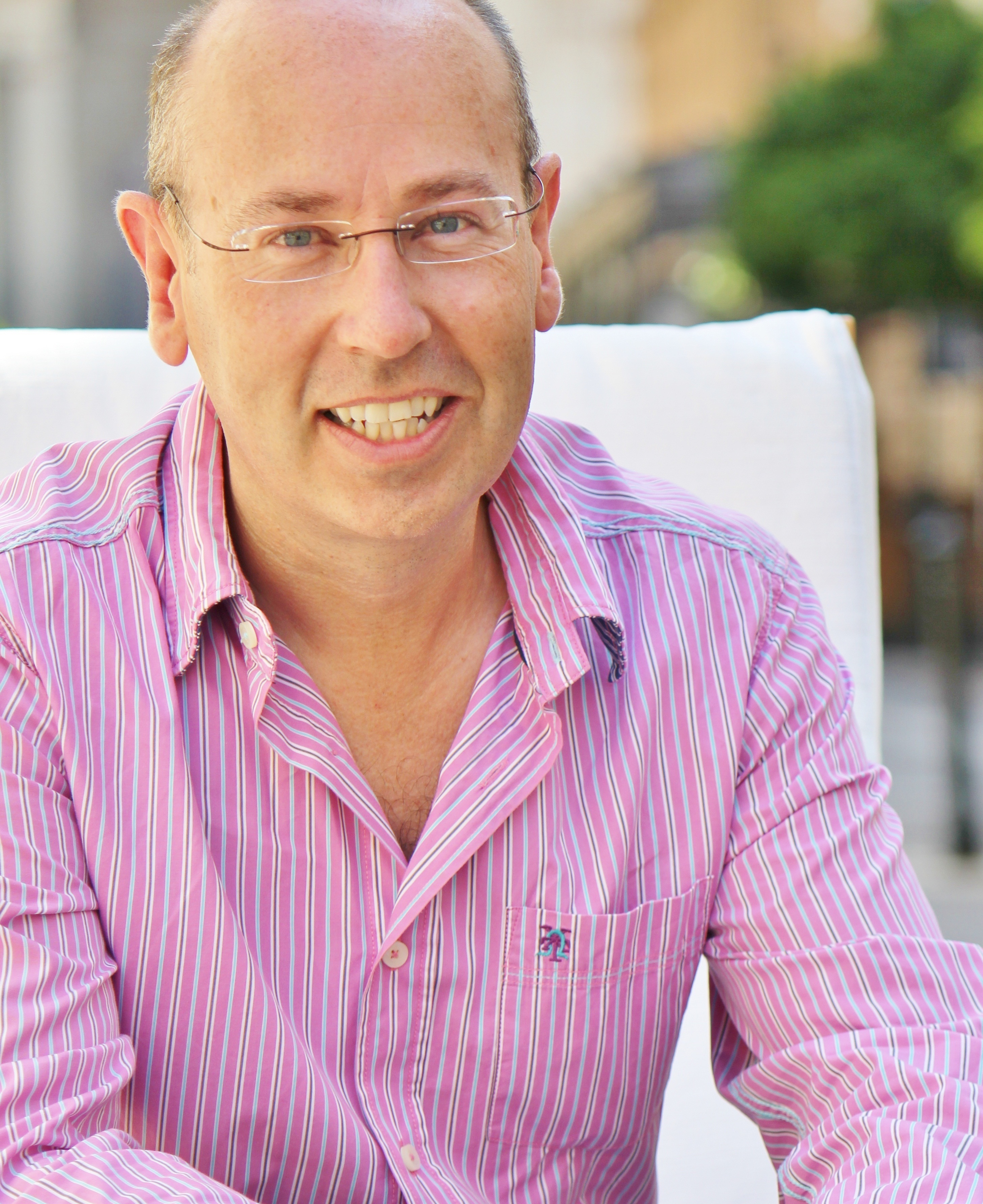
- Powlett in 2015
- Born: Mark James Powlett; 26 September 1967 (age 59); Stratford-upon-Avon, England
- Occupations: Clinical hypnotherapist, Broadcaster, Actor, Writer
- Years active: 1994–present

Mark Powlett (born 26 September 1967) is an English clinical hypnotherapist, broadcaster, actor and writer. He comments on news stories about hypnosis and the mind for many media news outlets, including curing a reporter's fear of flying and using lifts. He used to present the afternoon show on BBC CWR. He has hosted numerous live outside broadcasts notably from Stratford's Royal Shakespeare Theatre where his guests were Judi Dench and Patrick Stewart.

== Early career ==
Mark Powlett studied theatre at Coventry University and returned to present a Coventry Conversation for students in 2010. Since graduating Mark has appeared as an actor in numerous productions both in theatres and touring throughout the United Kingdom. These include Mr Brown in Paddington Bear in 2003 and Dromio of Syracuse in The Comedy of Errors. He starred in pantomime at the Belgrade Theatre playing Wishee Washee in Aladdin in 2008. Prior to this he has appeared in Cinderella (Solihull Arts Centre), Peter Pan (Melton Mowbray Theatre) and Aladdin (Palace Theatre Redditch). However, he is best known to young children as the inept Traffic Policeman in the BBC Children’s TV series Brum. This role has taken him to the Edinburgh and MIPCOM festivals and seen him hosting a live one man show that played to audiences of over twenty thousand. He has appeared in a variety of corporate videos for clients such as BT, Unison and the Coop. Mark Powlett has had a successful career in stand up comedy, playing all over the country including supporting Rory McGrath on tour. He was also the winner of the Virgin New Comedy Award in 1996, and has performed live comedy on Radio and TV. Performances included an appearance on Russ and Jono’s breakfast show, compere for comedy clubs across the country and Five’s Company for Channel 5. Mark presented Arts File for BBC Television in 1990s.

== BBC Local Radio ==
Winning the BBC New Talent award in 2005 marked the start of his career as a radio presenter. After winning the New Talent award he became presenter of the early breakfast show on BBC CWR which he hosted for 3 years. He also worked with Liz Kershaw on the Breakfast show. During his time at BBC Coventry and Warwickshire Mark has presented The Breakfast show, Mid-morning, Drive and weekend shows. In 2008 Mark Powlett created The Mark Powlett show 2pm – 5pm weekday afternoons on BBC Coventry and Warwickshire.

Mark switched on the Christmas lights in his home town of Stratford-upon-Avon in 2009.

Due to changes to the BBC Coventry and Warwickshire schedule in 2011, Mark Powlett hosted his last show on 31 December 2010.

Since his departure from BBC Coventry and Warwickshire, Mark filled in for Keith Middleton's weekend show across the West Midlands on Saturday the 8th and Sunday 9 January 2011. He also stood in on the show broadcast on BBC Stoke, BBC Shropshire, BBC WM, BBC Hereford and Worcester, and BBC Coventry and Warwickshire on the Late show in March on the weekends of 12th and 13th and 19th and 20th and after spending most of the summer on the show he returned to fill in on 10 and 11 September. In 2012 he spent the month of March presenting the Late Show again. Alongside his Radio career Mark also has a YouTube channel with over 20K subscribers.
