= Edwin Ransford =

English opera singer and composer (1805–1876)

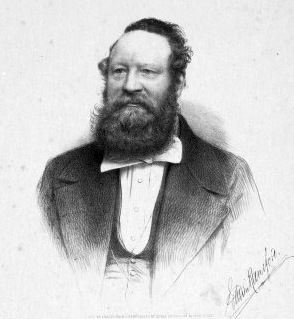
- Portrait of Ransford from a mid 19th century poster
- Born: 13 March 1805; Bourton-on-the-Water, Gloucestershire, England
- Died: 11 July 1876 (aged 71); 59 Welbeck Street, Cavendish Square, London
- Resting place: Bourton-on-the-Water, Gloucestershire
- Occupation(s): Opera singer and composer
- Spouse: Hannah Ransford (m. 1825–1876)

Edwin Ransford (13 March 1805 – 11 July 1876) was an English opera singer and composer.

== Biography ==
Ransford was born at Bourton-on-the-Water, near Moreton-in-Marsh, Gloucestershire, on 13 March 1805. He first appeared on the stage as an extra in the opening chorus at the King's Theatre, Haymarket, and was afterwards engaged in the chorus at Covent Garden. During Charles Kemble's management of Covent Garden, Ransford was heard as a baritone in the part of Don Caesar in the Castle of Andalusia, performed on 27 May 1829, and was engaged soon afterwards by Samuel James Arnold for the English Opera House (now the Lyceum).

In the autumns of 1829 and 1830 he was at Covent Garden. In 1831 he played leading characters under Robert William Elliston at the Surrey Theatre, where he won great popularity. In 1832 he was with Joseph Grimaldi at Sadler's Wells, playing Tom Tuck in Andrew V. Campbell's nautical drama The Battle of Trafalgar, in which he made a great hit with S. C. Neukomm's song "The Sea". At this theatre in 1831 he sustained the part of Captain Cannonade in John Barnett's opera, The Pet of the Petticoats.

On 3 November 1831 at Drury Lane, he played Giacomo in Auber's Fra Diavolo, its first production in England. He afterwards fulfilled important engagements at Drury Lane, the Lyceum, and Covent Garden. At Covent Garden he played the Doge of Venice in Othello on 25 March 1833, when Edmund Kean made his last appearance on the stage; and Sir Harry in the School for Scandal on Charles Kemble's last appearance as Charles Surface. His final theatrical engagement was with Macready at Covent Garden in 1837–38.

After his retirement from the stage Ransford for a time sang at concerts, and then, from 1845 onwards, produced a series of popular musical entertainments, in which he was the chief performer. Among these ventures were "Illustrations of Gipsy Life and Character" (with the words to the songs by Eliza Cook), "Tales of the Sea", and "Songs of Dibdin".

Ransford was also well known as a composer of songs and glees, and between 1835 and 1876 more than fifty published pieces bear his name. For some years he was also in business as a music publisher at Charles Street, Soho Square, and at 2 Princes Street, Cavendish Square, London.

He died at 59 Welbeck Street, Cavendish Square, London, on 11 July 1876, and was buried at Bourton-on-the-Water on 15 July. His wife Hannah, who he had married in March 1825, died on 22 November 1876, aged 71.

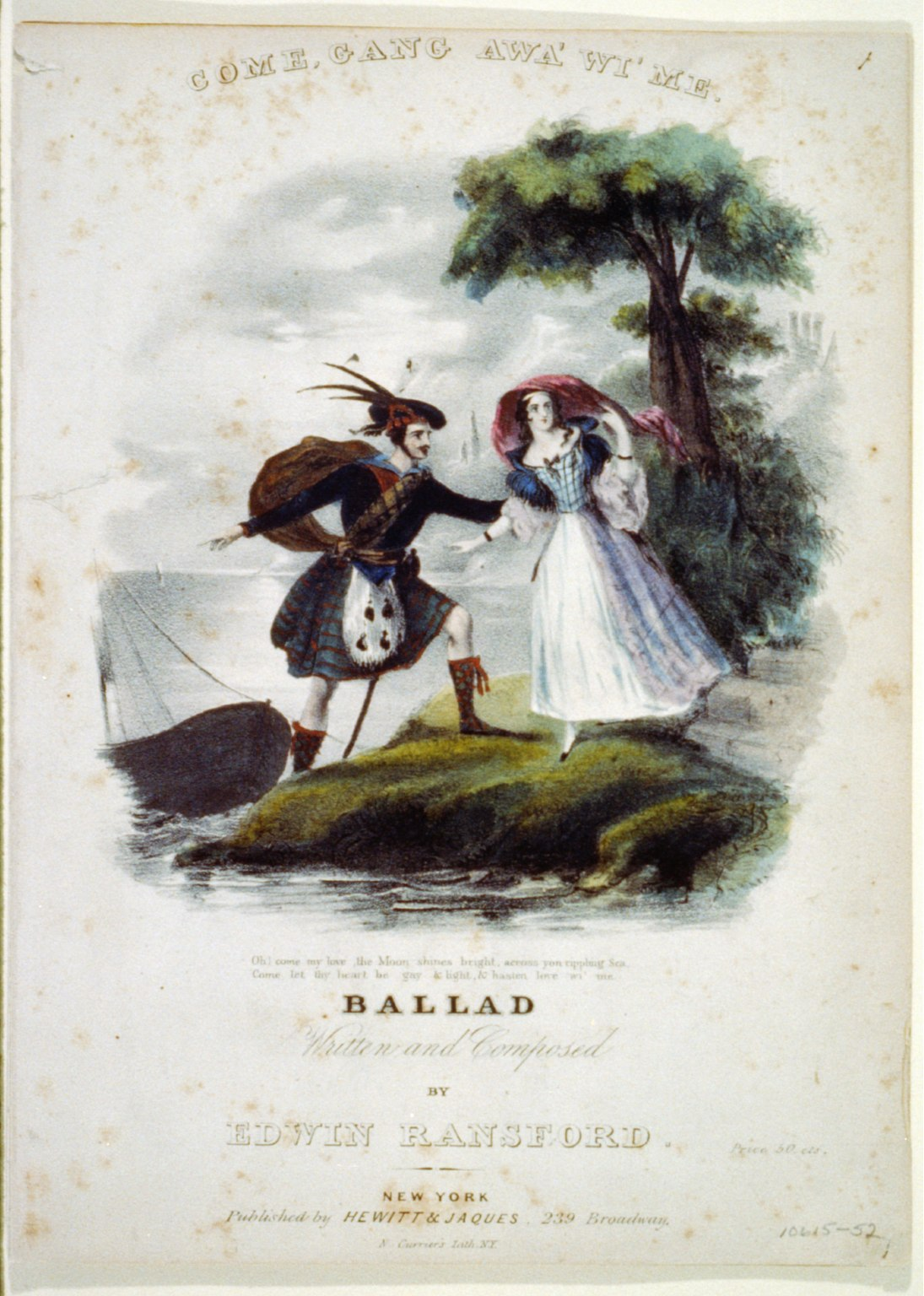
Cover illustration for "Come, gang awa' wi' me"

Among his published songs, in which the words as well as the music were by himself, were: "Come, gang awa' wi' me", 1840, and "Summer is nigh", 1842. Under the name of "Aquila" he composed thirteen "Sacred Ballads" (1862–9), and wrote the words of the well-known song, "In the Days when we went gipsying". He was the author of "Jottings – Music in Verse", 1863.
