= Brum (TV series) =

British children's television series

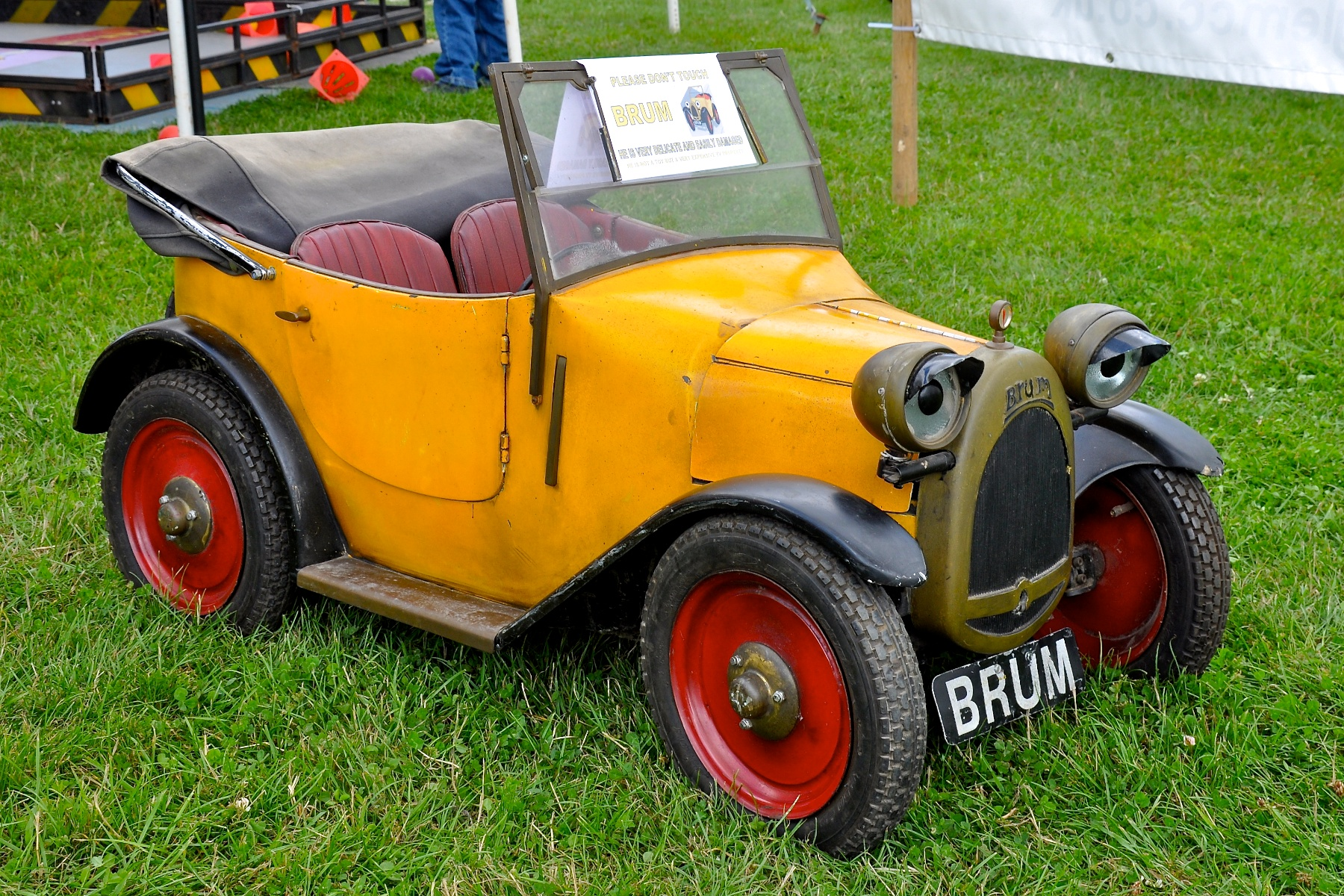
- The Brum model used in the series
- Genre: Adventure; Comedy
- Created by: Frank Beattie; Anne Wood
- Developed by: Ragdoll Productions
- Starring: Brum; Mike Cavanagh; Shirley-Anne Bohm; Mark Barnsley; Deborah Grant; Andrew Davenport; Brian Wilson; Catherine Mathers; Hugo Whyte; Lesley Stanier; Mark Powlett; John Woodford; Linda Kerr Scott; Adam Schumacher; Yemi Adenle; Gary Barber
- Narrated by: Toyah Willcox; Tom Wright; Sarah Wichall
- Ending theme: "Brum, Brum Gets Things Done", By Beggs/Harris/Sheppard (series 3)
- Composers: Andrew McCrorie-Shand (series 1); Robert Hartley (series 2); Paul Honey; Howard McGill (series 3)
- Country of origin: United Kingdom
- Original language: English
- No. of series: 3
- No. of episodes: 66

Production
- Executive producers: Tom Poole; Vic Finch
- Running time: 6–18 minutes
- Production company: Ragdoll Productions

Original release
- Network: BBC1 (Series 1-2); CBeebies (series 3)
- Release: 26 September 1991 – 4 November 2002

Brum is a British children's television series created by Frank Beattie and Anne Wood. The series was originally narrated by Toyah Willcox, who also provided the voice for Brum and all characters. The show aired for three series between 1991 and 2002, with two revived CGI series on YouTube in 2016. The show first aired on BBC1 on the children's block, Children's BBC, and later on CBeebies.

Set in the "Big Town" (mostly filmed in Birmingham, England) and produced by Ragdoll Productions, Brum's first broadcasting was in 1991 and the last live-action series was broadcast in 2002. It was initially directed, written and produced by Anne Wood and initially narrated by Toyah Willcox who also provided the voice for Brum and all the characters in story form. In series 3, all the characters including Brum were silent except for all the car noises. The voiceover format used in the early 2000s was completely different; rather than the traditional storytelling format used in a third-person story form by Toyah Willcox, two child narrators, Tom Wright and Sarah Wichall, were featured, and each child narrator would most often comment on several of the events of each episode similar to silent film. Although it is the case, each child narrator would also do some of the on-screen characters' short spoken dialogue, a voiceover technique retained from the first two series produced in the 1990s. A new CGI-animated series, aimed at young pre-school children, was produced in 2016.

== Plot and setting ==
Brum is the story of a small, sentient yellow vintage car named Brum who ventures out into the Big Town when his owner is not looking and gets up to all manner of adventures. Each episode begins and ends in the same way, with Brum leaving the other cars in the motoring museum when the owner's back is turned and heading out to explore the Big Town, before eventually returning to his place. Each series has had its own background music. From series 1–2, the introduction music was the same, but in series 2, it used different instruments. From series 3–5, the music became jazzy, and a new title sequence was directed by Nigel P. Harris.

Brum can express himself in various mechanical ways, including opening and closing his doors and bonnet, bobbing his suspension, and flashing and swivelling. The actors in Brum do not speak, with mime and off-screen narration used instead to continue the story. It was therefore easy to prepare episodes for airing in other countries, and the series has been broadcast in many parts of the world and in many languages.

In addition to the onomatopoeic nature of a car engine revving, the name Brum (as a contraction of "Brummagem") is a reference to the common colloquial name for the city of Birmingham where most of the Big Town scenes were filmed. Although the series makes no direct mention of Birmingham, many of the city's streets and landmarks can be seen in each episode although other locations were occasionally used.

The show was written by a range of writers. Anne Wood primarily wrote all the first series, while the second was written by Tom Poole, Dirk Campbell, Andrew Davenport and Morgan Hall. The last two series were written by Nigel P. Harris (5 Episodes) and the existing Ragdoll team.

The car itself – a half-scale replica of a late-1920s Austin 7 Chummy convertible – was designed and built by Rex Garrod. It is now housed at the Cotswold Motoring Museum in Bourton-on-the-Water, Gloucestershire, which is also where the opening and closing sequences of the programme were filmed.

== Characters ==
=== 1990s ===
- Museum Owner (Mike Cavanagh): The owner of the car museum where Brum lives. He is the only human character who appears in every episode and the only character who is apparently oblivious to Brum's adventures, (except for one where he finds Brum broken down at the scrapyard and helps him escape) despite finding items in Brum's back-seat at the end of each episode in Series 1 and 2. The actor, Mike Cavanagh, actually owned the Cotswold Motoring Museum until 1999. He died in 2021, and there is a plaque dedicated to him on the wall at the entrance to the Museum.
- The Lollipop Lady (Shirley-Anne Bohm): A lady who helps people, and Brum, cross the road safely, she appears in every episode in the second series.
- WPC Truncheon (Deborah Grant): the police officer in Big Town.
- Mr. and Mrs. La-Di-Dah (Brian Wilson and Lesley Stanier): A posh married couple who regularly featured in the second series.
- Mr. and Mrs. Doolally (Mark Barnsley; Zoey Foley O'Neill in Series 2, Ep. 4–5, 7, 10 and Theresa O'Malley in Series 2, Ep. 8): A friendly, if extremely absent-minded, couple who regularly featured in the first and second series.
- Vicky Spoon (Catherine Mathers): A regular cast member of the second series, Vicky is Brum's special friend.
- Micky Mender (Hugo Whyte): A handyman, a regular cast member of the second series.
- Two Big Town Bullies (Shazad Mahmood and Georgina Treharne)
- The Scrap Dealers (Dave Evans and Mark Walter)
- The Newspaper Boy (Daniel Brocklebank)

=== 2000s ===
==== Townspeople ====
- Traffic Policeman (Mark Powlett): A "knock-about" policeman, who owns a horse called Arrow who loves being fed apples. He wishes to sing in the Big Town's pop band, and always followed the rules when he was much younger.
- Granny Slippers (Linda Kerr Scott): An old lady who wears slippers wherever she goes, especially when shopping. As her name implies, she loves slippers to the point she owns 1,007 different pairs. She also has a kitten named Lucky. Despite her age, she would wish to "beat a motorbike in a race someday".
- Visiting Man (Jos Houben): One of Big Town's tourists. He loves taking pictures (especially of Brum) and discovering areas of Big Town he has not discovered yet. He also holds the Big Town record for standing on one leg.
- Mr. Brillo (Robert Thirtle): A man who lives next door to Granny Slippers. He has a wide collection of garden gnomes and wishes to own over 100 of them. His favourite gnome is a 342-year-old one named Gnorman. His favourite picture is the Gnoma Lisa.
- Gorgeous Gordon (Enoch White): A self-centred, arrogant hair-dresser who wears a black wig.
- Bob & Job (Kevin McGreevy & Adam Schumacher): Two comically clumsy men, who wear green dungarees and yellow T-shirts and help the big town in a way of slapstick style from Laurel and Hardy.
- Scruffy: A good friend of Brum's, a dog who loves bones, hot dogs and burying things. He once ate 150 hot dogs in one week.
- Big Town Mayor (John Woodford): The town manager.
- The Visiting Lady (Iona Kennedy / Carole Davies): The Visiting Man's wife who lives in the town.
- The Mayoress (Lesley Stanier): The mayor of Big Town.
- The Celebrity (Johnnie Fiori): A celebrity who appeared in the episode "Brum and the Airport Adventure" when she had her jewels stolen by Bubble & Squeak at the Big Town Airport.
- Mrs Posh (Iona Kennedy): The Richest lady in Big Town.
- Sally: A woman in the Big Town who had her cake stolen by teenagers on her birthday party in the episode, Brum and the Birthday Cake/Brum and the Cake Gang.
- Policewoman (Lisa Allen)

==== Baddies ====
- Two Masked Bank Robbers (Robert Goodman and Barry Robinson): Appeared in Brum and the Magician.
- The Big Town Robber (Andrew Davenport): Always up to mischief, the robber's antics include stealing the trophy for the big race. Brum is usually the one that foils his plans as seen in "Brum and the Big Chase/Dancing in the Street", and "Brum and the Big Town Race/Brum and the Trophy".
- Rob & Nick (Dan Carey and Jason Segade): A bumbling pair of thieves who are best known for stealing Mr. Brillo's gnome, robbing the golf buggy at the Big Town Golf Course, a posh celebrity's dog, Money hat from the artist and a waiter's apron at the pizza restaurant. They appeared in Brum and the Pizzeria, Brum and the Posh Dog/Brum and the Diamond Dog, Brum and the Golf Buggy, Brum and the Kidnapped Garden Gnome/Brum and the Garden Gnome, and Brum and the Paint Pandemonium/Brum and the Artist.
- Bubble & Squeak (Chalky Skywalker Chawner and Paul Jackson): A pair of thieves who love anything shiny, especially jewels. They wear clothes that never fit because they were stolen from washing lines. They appeared in Brum and the Airport Adventure, Brum and the Golden Loo, and Brum and the Bank Robbers/Brum and the Heavy Safe.
- Big Bad (Paul Filipiak): Appeared in Chasing Balloons, Brum and the Pantomime Cow/Brum and the Theatrical Thieves, Brum and the Snow Thieves, and Brum and the Splash and Grab.
- Big Bad's Partner (Christine Nayrolles): Appeared in Brum and the Snow Thieves and Brum and the Shop Window Dummy/Brum and the Mannequin.
- Big Bad's Partner (Kay Stanley): Appeared in Brum and the Splash and Grab.
- Big Bad's Female Assistant (Justine Marriott): Appeared in Bushes on the Run.
- Big Bad's Male Assistant (Eric Mallett): Appeared in Brum and the Pantomime Cow/Brum and the Theatrical Thieves with Big Bad and Bushes on the Run.
- The Shadow (Miles Anthony): A menacing thief and master of disguise. He appeared in Brum and the King of Thieves and Brum and the Gorilla Caper.
- Pickpocket Polly (Catherine Marimer): A pickpocket who stole a wallet from a visiting man, and, of course, she took the items from people and put them in her swag bag. She appeared in Brum and the Bowling Alley and Brum and the Pickpocket.
- Penny Pincher (Julia West): Appeared in Brum and the Music Box and Brum and the Stopwatch Botch.
- Cake Gang: (Kerry Dean, Gavin Cooper, David Smith, Charmaine Samuels and Liam Mullan): A group of greedy teenagers who stole a birthday cake from Sally in Brum and the Birthday Cake/Brum and the Cake Gang.
- Magic Paul (Andy Dawson): A thief (disguised as a magician) who is his assistant of Pickpocket Polly. He appeared in Brum and the Pickpocket.
- The Beady-Eyed Robber (Heather Tyrrell): Appeared in Brum and the Stolen Necklace.

== Episodes ==
=== Series 1 (1991) ===
1. Brum to the Rescue - 26 September 1991
2. Brum and the Kite – 3 October 1991
3. Brum at the Scrapyard – 10 October 1991
4. Brum at the Opera – 17 October 1991
5. Brum and the Mad Mower – 24 October 1991
6. Brum at the Seaside – 31 October 1991
7. Brum and the Little Girl Lost – 7 November 1991
8. Brum and the Wheels – 14 November 1991
9. Brum and the Stilt Walker – 21 November 1991
10. Brum and the Removal Van – 28 November 1991
11. Brum and the Magician – 5 December 1991
12. Brum and the Runaway Pram – 12 December 1991
13. Brum on Safari – 19 December 1991

=== Series 2 (1994) ===
The second series of the show was first broadcast on Children's BBC in October 1994 and consisted of 13 main episodes with the runtime of each episode being increased to 15 minutes. Toyah Wilcox reprised her role as the narrator.

Most episodes of this series were later edited by the BBC in the late 1990s, reducing the feature length of the 26 episodes down to 10 minutes to fit with the runtime of the first series. These were broadcast until 2001.

1. Brum and the Helicopter – 6 October 1994
2. Brum and the Crane – 13 October 1994
3. Brum Goes Ice Skating – 20 October 1994
4. Brum Dances in the Street – 27 October 1994
5. Brum at a Wedding (3 November 1994): Brum visits a wedding ceremony.
6. Brum and the Rascally Robber (10 November 1994): Brum confronts a robber.
7. Brum and the Supermarket – 17 November 1994
8. Brum and the Very Windy Day (24 November 1994): Brum goes out on a very windy day.
9. Brum and the Street Party – 1 December 1994
10. Brum and the Naughty Kitten (8 December 1994): Brum comes to the aid of a lost kitten.
11. Brum and the Marching Brass Band – 15 December 1994
12. Brum and the Flood (22 December 1994): Brum encounters a flood.
13. Brum Goes House Painting (29 December 1994): Brum performs a spot of house painting.

=== Series 3 (2001–02) ===
The third series featured a brand new format, depicting Brum as a superhero car, where he stops thieves and even has his own song at the end of every episode ("Brum Gets Things Done"). There is no adult narrator in this series, but instead, each episode has a child narrator commenting on what is happening. There were 40 episodes broadcast across 2001 and 2002 on Children's BBC and CBeebies.

No.	Title	Original release date
1	"Brum and the Airport Adventure"	3 September 2001
A celebrity visiting Big Town is ready to go home, but trouble strikes when the two famous thieves named Bubble and Squeak swap her suitcase containing jewels for one containing smelly old underpants. Brum is ready for some heroic action as the thieves try to escape on cargo plane, but can he stop it from taking off?
2	"Brum and the Naughty Dog"	10 September 2001
Attempting to chase after a flying hot dog, Scruffy the Dog causes chaos everywhere in the Big Town.
3	"Brum and the Pizzeria"	17 September 2001
Nick and Rob are on the verge of taking the pizzeria's money belt, and disguise themselves as chefs. However, Brum is ready to stop them.
4	"Brum and the Gymnast"	24 September 2001
A gymnast loses her hoop and it goes around the Big Town, causing a great deal of trouble. Brum races to rescue it.
5	"Brum and the King of Thieves"	1 October 2001
A more atrocious Big Town thief named The Shadow steals the king's crown from the Big Town museum. However, can Brum see through his sightful disguise and stop him?
6	"Brum and the Skateboarding Bride"	8 October 2001
During a wedding, the bride is whisked away on a skateboard and Brum goes off to save and bring her back to the church on time.
7	"Chasing Balloons" "Brum and the Balloons"	15 October 2001
The Big Town balloon seller enjoys selling balloons to tourists and certainly boosts business, but what ends up happening when Big Bad steals them all?
8	"Brum and the Stolen Necklace" "Brum and the Necklace"	22 October 2001
After a man buys his girlfriend a new pearl necklace, a beady-eyed baddie swipes it and it's up to Brum to stop the thief.
9	"Brum and the Pantomime Cow" "Brum and the Theatrical Thieves"	29 October 2001
Big Bad and his friend take away the busker's well-earned cash. They disguise themselves as a pantomime cow. However, Brum is not fooled by them and is ready to stop them.
10	"Brum and the Runaway Train"	5 November 2001
At the grand opening of a brand new fairground train attraction, the Big Town Mayor accidentally sends himself running fast down the track on the train when a photo was attempted to be taken. As a result, it is up to Brum to race to the rescue!
11	"Brum and the Birthday Cake" "Brum and the Cake Gang"	12 November 2001
It is Sally's birthday party and she is awaiting a delicious birthday cake, but a group of teenagers nicknamed the Cake Gang are on the verge to take the cake themselves.
12	"Brum and the Mobile Phone"	19 November 2001
Scruffy swaps out a businessman's mobile phone for a bone, and Brum must find a way to get the little dog out of trouble.
13	"Bushes on the Run" "Brum and the Bushes"	26 November 2001
In a garden centre, Big Bad and his assistant disguise themselves as bushes to take away the flower seller’s money.
14	"Brum and the Diamond Dog" "Brum and the Posh Dog"	3 December 2001
Nick and Rob are back and make off with the important Lady’s diamond-studded dog collar.
15	"Brum and the Music Box"	10 December 2001
In a ballet class, another thief, Penny Pincher, steals the class's music box.
16	"Brum and the Runaway Statue" "Brum and the Statue Rescue"	17 December 2001
The Mayoress reveals a brand new statue of herself, but it to roll away.
17	"Brum and the Snow Thieves"	27 December 2001
At the Big Town Snow Dome, Big Bad and his assistant steal money from the till and end up on a wild icy chase with Brum right behind them.
18	"Brum and the Kitten Rescue"	8 April 2002
Brum goes off to save Granny Slippers' cat Lucky, after she gets trapped in the Big Town clock after chasing some wool.
19	"Brum and the Splash and Grab" "Brum and the River Race"	15 April 2002
In the Big Town swimming gala, Big Bad and his assistant steal away the medals and trophies. But they always know that when there is stolen loot, Brum is right near them.
20	"Brum and the Golden Loo"	22 April 2002
Mr. and Mrs. Bank Manager purchase a new golden toilet after their toilet brakes. However, Bubble and Squeak are after it.
21	"Brum and the Golf Buggy"	29 April 2002
A golf buggy may not be the best escape vehicle for Nick and Rob, who have stolen various trophies from a golf course, so Brum is on the case.
22	"Brum the Football Hero" "Brum the Soccer Hero"	6 May 2002
Brum is available to support the Yellows in a football game against their rivals, the Reds, who will try anything to win, including cheating, and Brum needs to do what he can to stop the pesky cheaters.
23	"Brum and the Rampant Robot"	13 May 2002
When a homemade robot malfunctions from an accidental liquid spill, it rolls out of control through the Big Town. It is up to Brum to stop it and rescue it.
24	"Brum and the Show Window Dummy" "Brum and the Mannequin"	20 May 2002
A baddie is after a beautiful wedding dress, but is unable to take it off the shop mannequin, so she takes that as well.
25	"Brum and the Bowling Alley"	27 May 2002
Pickpocket Polly targets the Big Town bowling alley by stealing the wallets of customers, including the Visiting Man.
26	"Brum the Basketball Star" "Brum and the Basketball"	3 June 2002
The Big Town wheelchair basketball team is having bad luck during the wheelchair basketball final due to the Blues' unfair way of playing mostly during the first round. Can Brum and his spectating friend help the Big Town team win?
27	"Brum and the Gorilla Caper"	10 June 2002
The Shadow is back and this time has stolen the busking money from a trio of performers dressed up as gorillas.
28	"Brum and the Runaway Sofa"	17 June 2002
When an abandoned sofa rolls away from the Corporation Men, Brum is on the case to stop it and retrieve it for some children who were playing on it.
29	"Brum and the Kidnapped Garden Gnome" "Brum and the Garden Gnome"	24 June 2002
Nick and Rob steal Mr Brillo's prize gnome and decide to charge extra for it at their local market stall.
30	"Brum and the Runaway Ball"	1 July 2002
When the Corporation Men lose grip on an ornamental stone ball, Brum is on the verge to get it back to them.
31	"Brum and the Stunt Bike Rescue" "Brum and the Stunt Bike"	2 September 2002
Max Speed shows off his new stunt bike at a show, but when Granny Slippers accidentally takes it out for a spin, Brum must help her before it is too late.
32	"Brum and the Stopwatch Botch"	9 September 2002
Penny Pincher is back and has now taken the Visiting Man's stopwatch. Brum must spin his way in the Sports Centre to get it back.
33	"Brum and the Cream Balloon"	16 September 2002
It is the day of the children's party, and the Visiting Man mistakenly inflates a balloon with cream instead of air. Brum must find a way to let the balloon burst safely.
34	"Brum and the Pickpocket"	23 September 2002
Pickpocket Polly and Magic Paul steal shiny and valuable things during a street show.
35	"Brum and the Daring Gnome Rescue" "Brum and the New Gnome"	30 September 2002
When Mr. Brillo accidentally sends his precious Gnome up towards the Big Town flagpole, Brum is on the verge to get it back in a spectacular tightrope-esque way.
36	"Brum and the Mischievous Mouse" "Brum and the Mouse"	7 October 2002
A girl's pet mouse escapes and causes havoc at the Big Town Dancing Hall.
37	"Brum and the Bank Robbers" "Brum and the Heavy Safe"	14 October 2002
Bubble and Squeak steal the safe containing Mrs Posh's jewels, but they soon make their mistake reaching in mud and water.
38	"Brum and the Runaway Rickshaw"	21 October 2002
Mr. Brillo rides on a fancy rickshaw as part of a parade in the Big Town, but is soon sent sliding on it when the driver leaves it unattended for an ice cream break before it ends up crashing into a fence and subsequently teetering on the edge of a high building. Can Brum bring the rickshaw and Mr. Brillo back to safety?
39	"Brum and the Paint Pandemonium" "Brum and the Artist"	28 October 2002
It is a messy situation when the Big Town Artist’s money is stolen by Nick and Rob.
40	"Brum and the Crazy Chair Chase"	4 November 2002
Gorgeous Gordon is sent on a wild hayride on a new remote-control chair that seems to have a mind of its own. When the runaway chair gets stuck on a roller coaster, Brum must find a way to prevent a nasty accident from occurring during the chase.

=== Bag of Gags ===
The Bag of Gags are short episodes included on the UK DVD releases as well as being featured on half-hour versions of Series 3. They do not contain any narration and focus on comedy and slapstick.

No.	Title	Original release date
1	"Brum and the Grapefruit Grab"	15 October 2001
In the Big Town market, Granny Slippers is buying supplies, but Scruffy is trying to take the grapefruit and will not let go!
2	"Brum and the Knicker Rescue"	15 October 2001
Scruffy takes a posh woman's pair of pink knickers and Brum must retrieve them.
3	"Brum and the Camera Caper"	15 October 2001
The Visiting Man is trying to take a picture of a couple, but they fall into a bus. It is Brum racing to the rescue!
4	"Brum and the Robot Box"	7 October 2002
A child's remote-control car goes off throughout Big Town and soon gets a box trapped in it. Only Brum can chase after it!
5	"Brum and the Poster"	7 October 2002
Bob and Job attempt to put up a poster, but the Visiting Man gets stuck on the frame.
6	"Brum and the Candyfloss"	7 October 2002
A little girl has bad luck when her candyfloss keeps blowing away. Brum is here to help her.

== Development ==
For the third season, 80 episodes were initially planned but for unknown reasons, only 40 were produced. During the development of it, Ragdoll renewed Video Collection International's Home Video deal on 12 June 2001, for seven years, in addition to the BBC acquiring the broadcast rights to the season. On 31 August, Ragdoll announced that the new season would premiere on 3 September, with the first VHS/DVD release of the new series to coincide on 8 October. On 7 October, Ragdoll launched the show internationally at MIPCOM, where the Australian Broadcasting Corporation acquired the Australian broadcast rights for the series to air on ABC for Kids in December, and on the ABC Kids channel in Spring 2002. The show would premiere on ABC TV on 11 March 2002.

On 17 January 2002, Ragdoll announced that the series would be one of the launching programs on the then-upcoming CBeebies channel in the United Kingdom. By MIPTV 2002 on 15 April, Ragdoll pre-sold the series to KRO in the Netherlands to air on their Z@ppelin channel's Kindertijd strand. They also announced that after MIPCOM 2001, NRK in Norway, SVT in Sweden and Kids Central in Singapore had also acquired the rights to the series in their respective countries. On 6 September, TV3 in New Zealand and RTÉ's Network 2 in Ireland acquired the broadcast rights, and premiered the series on 7 September and 10 September, respectively.

Discovery Communications later acquired the U.S. broadcast rights to the series and launched it on the Ready Set Learn! block on The Learning Channel and Discovery Kids in February 2003. In March, Ragdoll announced RTV Family Entertainment as the German partner for the series, with RTV confirming they would broadcast the show on their Ravensburger TV block on Super RTL at the end of June.

== WildBrain Media revivals ==
February 2016 saw the release of a rebooted Brum, made by the current owners of the franchise WildBrain. The show now takes place in a white-coloured setting instead of Big Town and features new friends for Brum. The first episode, "Brum's Car Wash Adventure", premiered on 4 March 2016 via the official Brum YouTube channel. A total of 25 CGI episodes were produced, with a second series currently airing.

Another series, this time animated using Toon Boom Harmony Animation called Brum & Friends, premiered on the channel in September 2017.

== Kiddie ride ==
A coin-operated kiddie ride of Brum was made by Amutec Ltd. The first version contains the original Brum theme song, and the second and third versions contain the rebooted closing credits song, also known as "Brum Gets Things Done".

== UK VHS/DVD releases ==
- Brum - Rescue and Other Stories (1991) (VHS)
- Brum - Wheels and Other Stories (1992) (VHS)
- Learn with Brum: Safari Park and other stories (1992) (VHS)
- Brum: Stilts, Seaside & Rescue (1994) (Watch & Play VHS)
- Children's Choice (Rosie & Jim, Playbox and Brum) (1992) (compilation VHS which contains the episode, "Brum and the Runaway Pram")
- Brum - Bumper Special: Seaside and 9 Other Stories (1993) (VHS)
- Brum: 2 on 1 - Rescue/Wheels and other stories (1995) (VHS)
- Brum and the Helicopter and Other stories (1994) (VHS)
- Brum - The Big Chase and other stories (1995) (VHS)
- Brum - The Naughty Kitten and Other Stories (1995) (VHS)
- Brum - The Little Drummer Boy and other stories (1995) (VHS)
- My Little Brum - Brum and the Big Chase/Brum is an Ice Skating Star (1996) (VHS)
- My Little Brum - Brum and the Helicopter/Brum and the Wedding (1996) (VHS)
- Brum - Biggest Party Video (1998) (VHS)
- Brum: Airport and Other Stories (2001) (VHS/DVD)
- Brum: Airport and Other Stories (2002) (VHS) (Marks & Spencer Re-Release) (This includes "Brum and the Runaway Train" as a bonus episode. This version was only released on VHS)
- Brum: Snow Thieves and Other Stories (2002) (VHS/DVD)
- Brum: Runaway Statue (2002) (The VHS was released in 2002, the DVD was released in 2004)
- Brum: Soccer Hero and Other Stories (The VHS was released in 2002, whilst the DVD was issued in 2004, it was only released in a carry case form)
- Brum: Stunt Bike Rescue and Other Stories (2003) (VHS/DVD)
- Brum: Crazy Chair Chase and other stories (2003) (VHS/DVD)
- Brum - Kitten Rescue and other stories (2003) (VHS/DVD)
- Brum - Stopwatch Botch and other stories (2004) (VHS/DVD)
- The Very Best of Brum (2004) (VHS/DVD) (The DVD release is the only Brum home media release to feature the "Brum and the Pickpocket" episode as a bonus episode, making this the only episode unavailable on VHS).

== Reception ==
Deirdre Sheppard of Common Sense Media, gave the series three stars out of five, saying, "When watching Brum, expect loud costumes, catchy music, silly dancing, and comedic choreographed coincidences. Since it moves much faster than most kids' programming, Brum is a good fit for kids with shorter attention spans and for parents who can't always stomach the monotony of other kids' television shows. Overall, it's a great pick -- just be sure to know when to fill in the gaps!."
