= Bekonscot =

Model village in Beaconsfield, England

Coordinates: 51°36′49″N 0°38′41″W

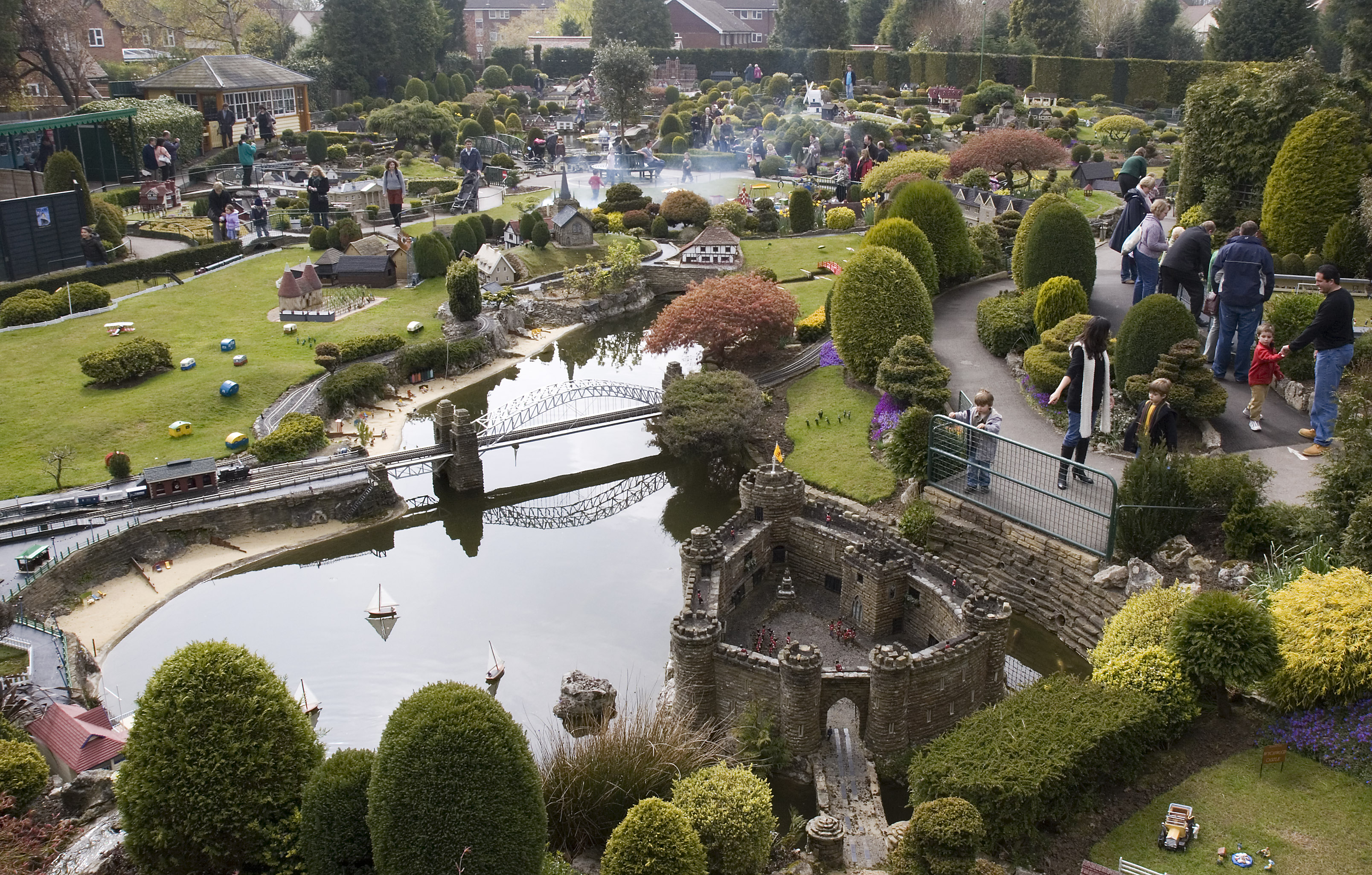
- View over site in 2008

- Location within Buckinghamshire
- Established: 1920s
- Location: Beaconsfield, Buckinghamshire, UK
- Type: Miniature park
- Founders: Roland Callingham; W. A. Berry
- Website: bekonscot.co.uk

Bekonscot Model Village and Railway is a model village built in the 1920s in Beaconsfield, Buckinghamshire, UK at a scale of one inch to one foot. It portrays aspects of England mostly dating from the 1930s and contains several fictitious villages featuring replicas of notable local buildings. The model railway has almost 10 scale miles (400 m) of tracks and in 2001, a 7 1/4 in gauge railway was opened to transport visitors. Bekonscot has become both a popular tourist location and a part of English culture. It is commonly referred to as the oldest surviving model village in the UK and by 2020, had received over 14 million visitors. Authors such as Enid Blyton, Mary Norton and Will Self have been inspired by the village.

== Creation ==
Bekonscot Model Village and Railway was created as a private miniature park in the 1920s by Roland Callingham and his gardener W. A. Berry. Callingham's wife had told him to take his model railway hobby outside their house, so he purchased four acres of land in Beaconsfield, Buckinghamshire, and built an ideal English village with a church, railway and high street, illuminated by electric lights. Everything was constructed at a scale of one inch to one foot. The railway was 1,200 feet (366 m) long and had stations including a London terminus called Maryloo (referencing real stations Marylebone and Waterloo). It was designed by Wenman Joseph Bassett-Lowke, who had also provided a train set made out of silver to the Maharaja of Gwalior. It was opened to the general public in 1929 and three years later it had become a popular tourist attraction. By 1933, it was opened to the public every Sunday between April and September with the railway running and every Tuesday, Thursday and Saturday afternoon without the trains working. The entrance fee was donated to the Railway Benevolent Institution and the Queen's Institute of District Nursing.

== History ==
In 1934, Bekonscot was visited by the young Elizabeth II on her eighth birthday. An article published in the National Geographic in 1937 praised the "flawless miniatures of wood and stone, metal, stucco, bright paint, and glass". Bekonscot, alongside Pendon Museum in Oxfordshire and Bourton-on-the-Water in Gloucestershire, inspired a trend for model villages in British seaside resort towns such as Babbacombe, Southport and Southsea. By the 1960s it was owned and run by the Bekonscot Model Railway and Charitable Association. It is commonly referred to as the oldest surviving model village in the UK, although the eccentric Charles Paget Wade constructed a village called Fladbury at his home Snowshill Manor in 1907, which has been restored by National Trust volunteers.

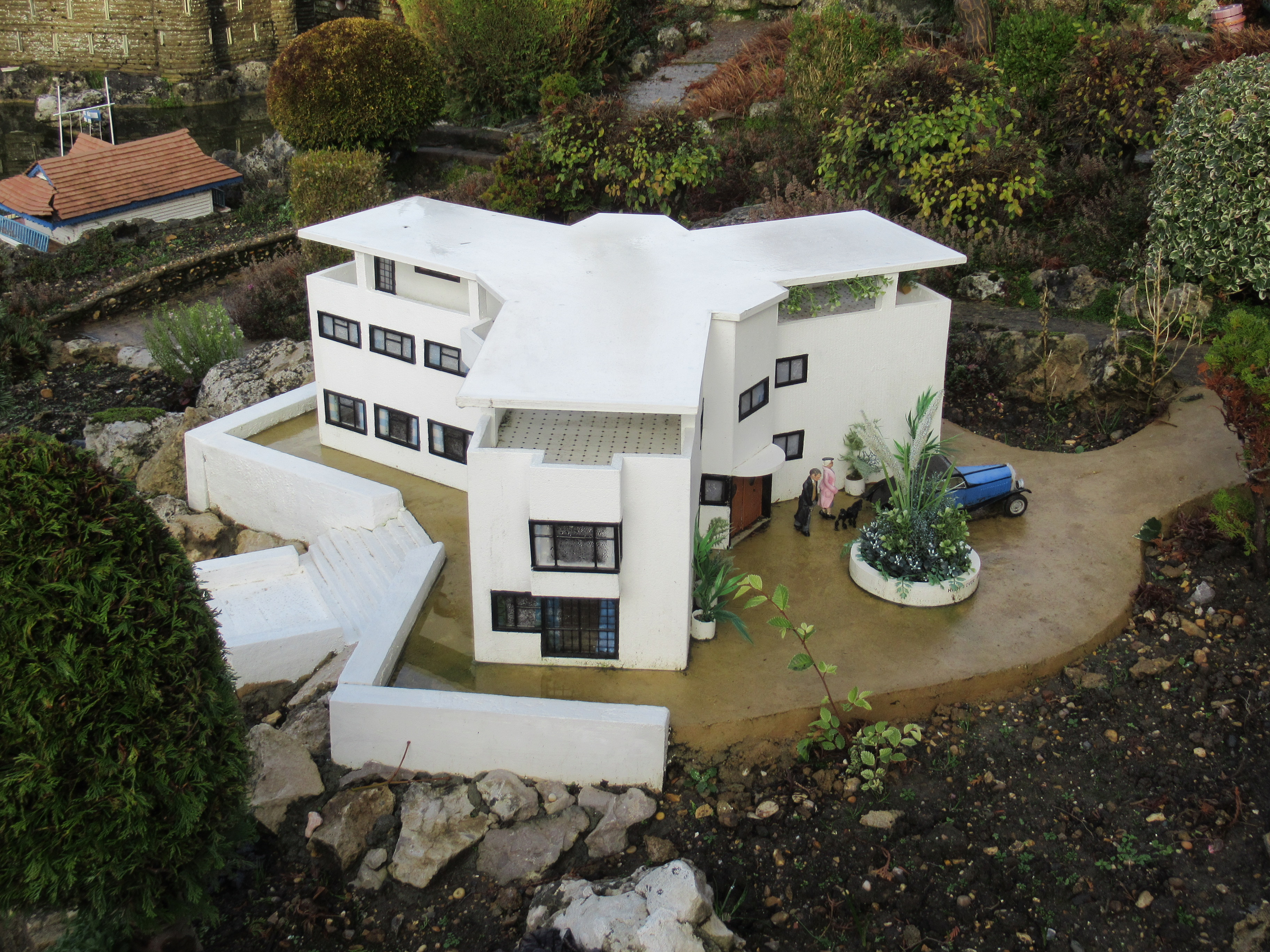
The replica of High and Over

Bekonscot was updated with recent developments such as Concorde and office buildings until the 1990s, when it was returned to the 1930s. By 2020, it had incorporated a new town and added a replica of High and Over, a house designed by Amyas Connell in the nearby town of Amersham. The project is now composed of the fictitious villages of Bekonscot, Evenlode new town and colliery, Epwood, Greenhaily, Hanton, Southpool and Splashyng, which are linked together by the model railway. It features replicas of some notable local buildings and contains features such as an airport, a cable car, a cathedral, a castle, a cricket match, pubs, windmills and a zoo. The zoo is named Chessnade after Chessington World of Adventures and Whipsnade Zoo; shops are titled with punning names, such as the butcher Sam and Ella, the dressmaker Miss A. Stitch, the florist Dan D. Lyon and the greengrocer Chris P. Lettis.

The model railway now has almost 10 scale miles (400 m) of tracks, with twelve stations and over 3,000 shrubs and trees. Trains run on a 1 gauge track and are powered by electricity. Visitors walk through the model village and can also look down on it from different viewing spots. In 2001, the Bekonscot Light Railway (BLR) was opened as a 7 1/4 in gauge railway which moves visitors around the village. The entire project closes over winter; smaller models are taken indoors, whilst larger buildings and the railway are refurbished on site.

== In popular culture ==
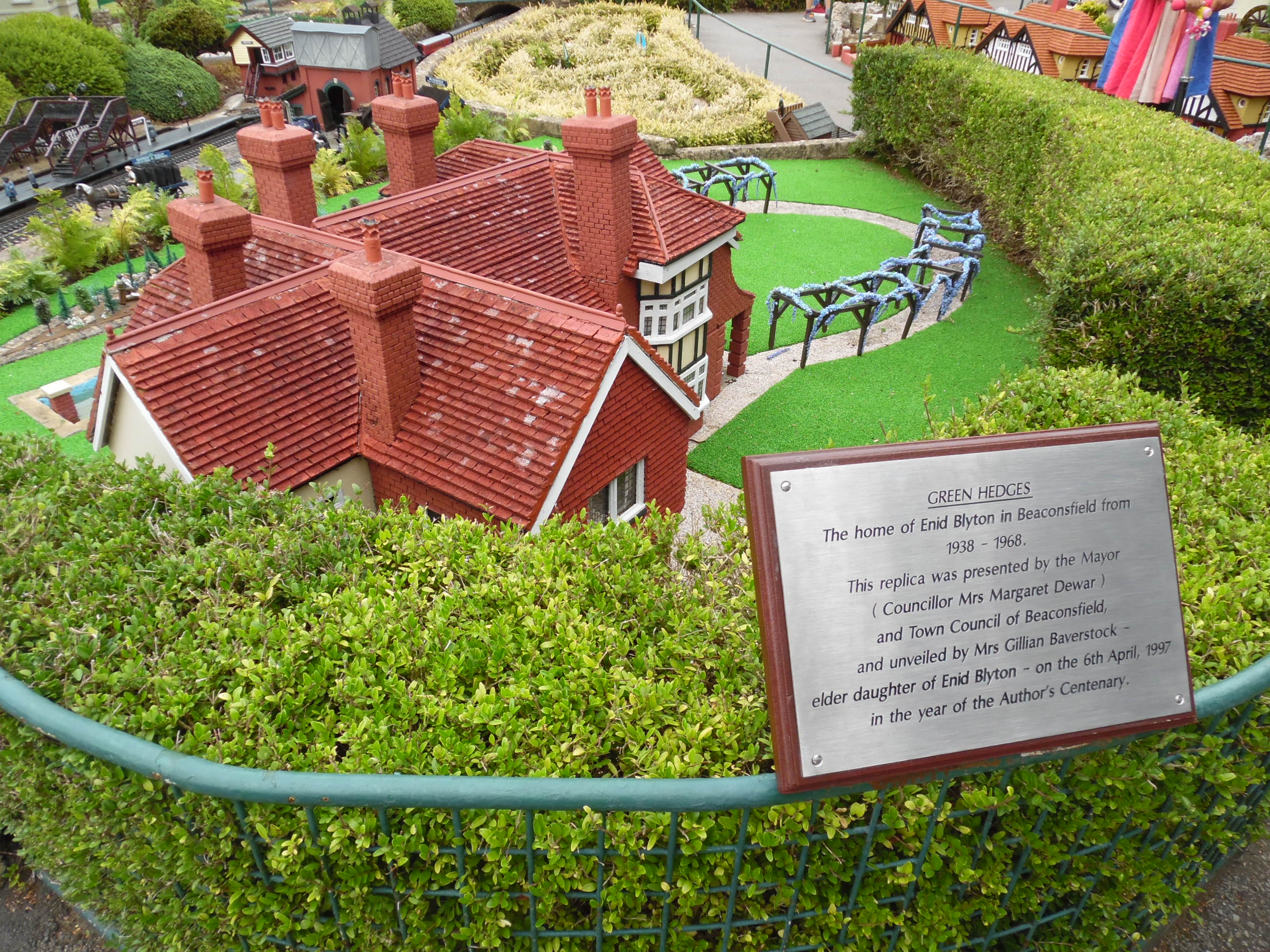
Enid Blyton was a resident of Beaconsfield and a replica of her house was added to the model village in 1997

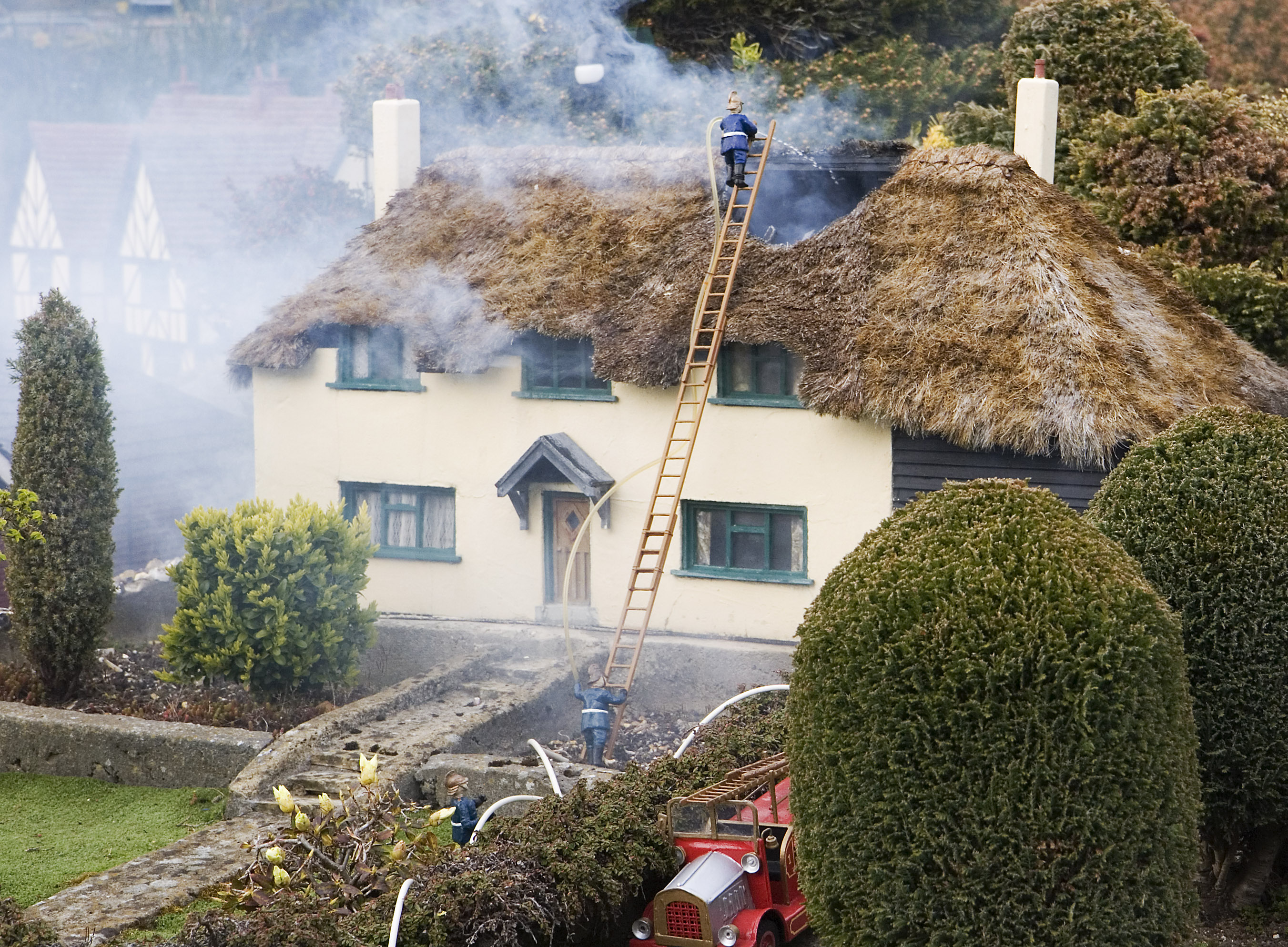
Model of a burning house at Bekonscot

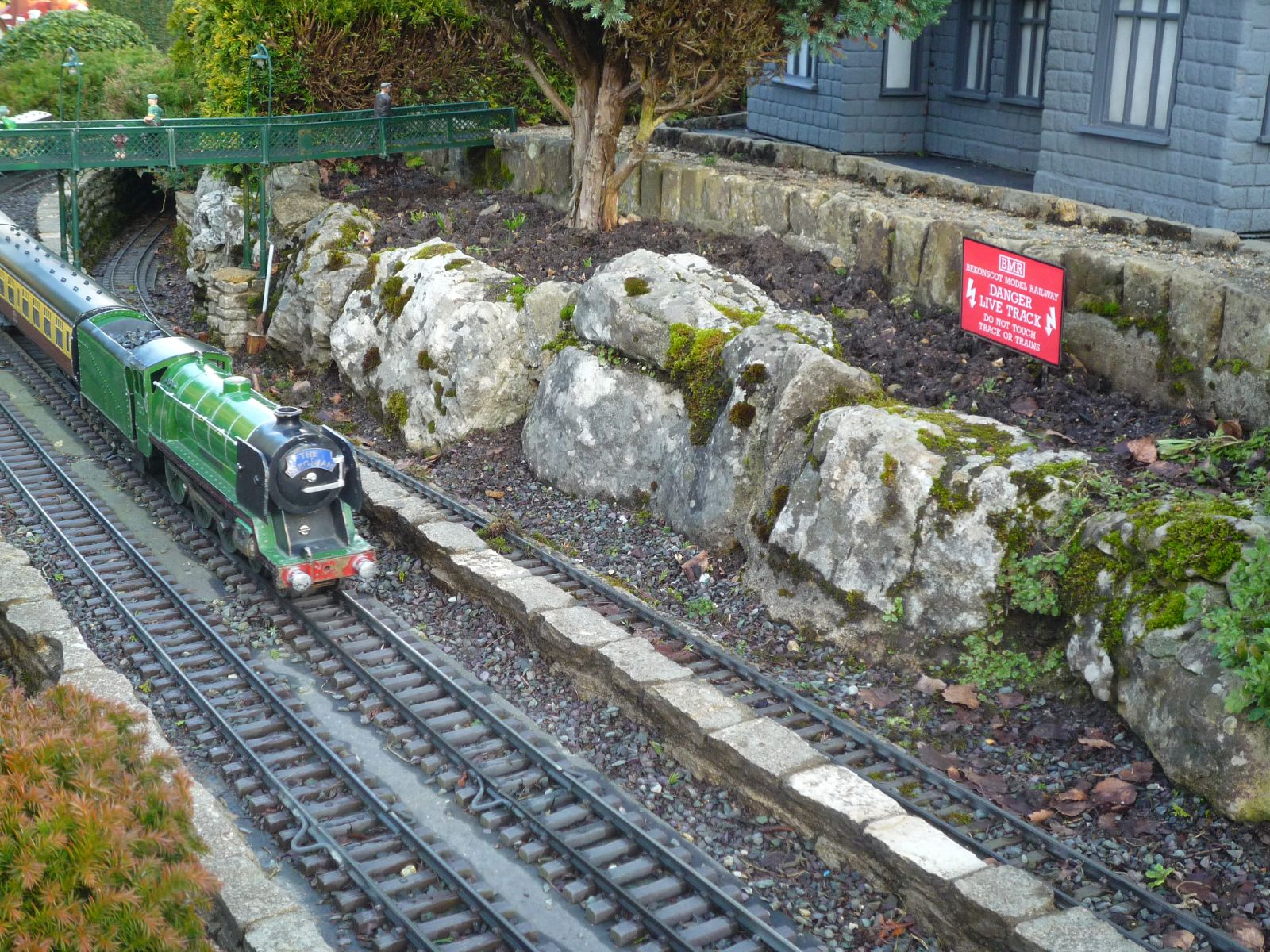
The model railway

Bekonscot is the oldest participant in the International Association of Miniature Parks (IMAP). By 2020, Bekonscot had received over 14 million visitors and had become part of English culture. The village frequently appears on lists of recommended family days out. It represents an idealised version of traditional English villages and its brochure states it is a "little piece of history that is forever England". Enid Blyton was a Beaconsfield resident and friend of Callingham; she set her short story "The Enchanted Village" in Bekonscot. The Sunday Telegraph reported that Toyland, where her fictional character Noddy lives, was inspired by Bekonscot. In tribute to Blyton, a replica of her now demolished house Green Hedges was installed in 1997. Mary Norton was inspired by Bekonscot when she wrote The Borrowers Aloft and Will Self set his short story "Scale" in the model village. Bekonscot also features in the non-fiction book Dreamstreets: A Journey Through Britain's Village Utopias. Historian Tim Dunn grew up nearby and has written the official guidebook.

== See also ==
- Bollocks to Alton Towers - a book about alternative days out in the UK which features Bekonscot
- Madurodam - a Dutch model village
- Tucktonia - a model village in Christchurch, Dorset which closed down in 1986
