= Birdland Park and Gardens =

Wildlife park in Gloucestershire, England

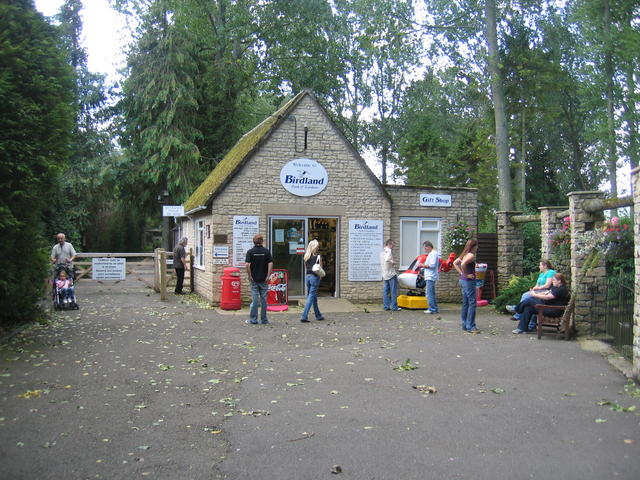
- Entrance in 2006
- Interactive map of Birdland Park and Gardens
- 51°52′49″N 1°45′15″W
- Date opened: 1989 (at current location)
- Location: Bourton-on-the-Water, Gloucestershire, England
- Land area: 7 acres (2.8 ha)
- Website: www.birdland.co.uk

Birdland Park and Gardens, often called Birdland, is a wildlife park in Bourton-on-the-Water, Gloucestershire, England. First opened in 1957, the park moved to its current site in 1989. Birdland began in the 5-acre (2.0 ha) grounds of a Tudor manor house called Chardwar and was started by Len Hill, who was often referred to as the Penguin Millionaire.

== Exhibits ==
There are around 500 birds contained within more than 150 open aviaries, including the River Windrush of 1.5 metres (4 ft 11 in) depth.

The park contains the only king penguins in England, Wales or Ireland. Other species of note include Pink-backed pelicans, Stanley or Blue cranes, White-naped cranes, cassowaries, Marabou storks and golden conures, also known as the golden parakeet; Birdland is part of an international breeding program for this vulnerable species.

The Desert House is a sparsely planted greenhouse to provide a suitable environment for birds that prefer near-arid conditions. Species include desert finches and carmine bee-eaters. Marshmouth Nature Reserve is a 2.5-acre (1.0 ha) nature reserve, home to a variety of indigenous species including common kingfishers.

== History ==
The park was opened in 1957 by Leonard W. Hill, a bird lover.

In 1970, Hill bought the Jason Islands, the most north-westerly islands in the Falkland Islands archipelago, comprising Grand Jason Island and Steeple Jason Island, both uninhabited. The islands (including some sheep bred by their owner) were offered to Hill for £10,000; after negotiation, he paid £5,500 for the islands without the sheep. Hill made them a private reserve for the many species of bird life visiting or living there, and supplied birds to various wildlife refuges in exchange for different birds for Birdland. Although Hill was a successful businessman, the purchase of the islands and the costs of the Birdland park took a financial toll on him.

Also in 1970, Hill commissioned a postage stamp for the Jason Islands to help fund his endeavours. The stamp was printed by Harrison and Sons, the company which printed British postage stamps for many years. Beneath the words 'Conservation Year 1970' was a portrait of Hill and a picture of Grand and Steeple Islands alongside some gentoo penguins.

In the late 1970s (the exact date is unknown), Hill issued a series of bank notes, purportedly authorised by the Jason Islands. They were in five denominations with different sizes and colours. 'Jason Islands' appeared in the top centre, alongside the value (from 50 pence to £20), with Hill's signature and portrait and a picture of one of his beloved birds, various species of penguin. The banknotes were: 50 pence (green) – a Humboldt penguin; 1 pound (purple) – a jackass penguin; 5 pounds (red) – a rockhopper penguin; 10 pounds (blue) – a gentoo penguin; and 20 pounds (brown) – a king penguin. The reverse of each note contained the words 'Valid until 31 December 1979'. That stipulation rendered them useless after that date; it is of a kind often used on private banknotes. The Falkland Islands Government took no legal action, seemingly considering it a private initiative, as only it had authority to issue currency for the Falkland Islands.

After Hill's death, both Birdland and the Jason Islands were sold by his family. Birdland was bought by the Trigg family, who put the park up for sale in 2012 and was then bought by Ian Cunningham, principal of Livingstone Leisure Ltd. The Jason Islands were purchased by Michael and Judy Steinhardt, who in turn donated them to the Wildlife Conservation Society.

== The park ==
The park contains around 6 acres (2.4 ha) of woodland, the River Windrush, ponds and gardens. It is a popular tourist attraction in the country, receiving an annual average of 73,000 visitors.

The current site housed a trout farm when Birdland took over occupancy and this has been incorporated into the attraction. Prior to this the site was a poplar tree plantation owned by Bryant and May for the production of matchsticks. Over 150 trees still form a canopy for the park.

== Cultural references ==
Birdland provided the live king penguins for the Hollywood film Batman Returns (1992).

== Mascots ==
The Central Flying School (CFS) is the longest serving flying school in the world, beginning in Upavon, Wiltshire on 12 May 1912. In February 1962, Len Hill presented CFS with its first official and live mascot, "Patrick" the pelican. The bird represented the CFS at many events, and a BBC documentary was made about him. He died in 1969. On 7 January 1971, "Frederick" became mascot, born in Kenya but trained at Birdland Institute of Zoology at the park in Bourton. Frederick died in 1986 of natural causes. 26 June 1987 saw "Cedric" become the CFS mascot. In May 2001, "Duncan Le Gayt" became mascot, and he resided at Birdland leading a relatively quiet life compared to his predecessors. In June 2024, to keep this tradition alive, Central Flying School (Helicopters) Squadron adopted another pelican, named Patrick II in memory of the first mascot, and the adoption papers were presented to Commandant CFS at the CFS(H) Sqn 70th Anniversary lunch.
