= Bourton-on-the-Water =

Village in England

Coordinates: 51.886°N 1.759°W

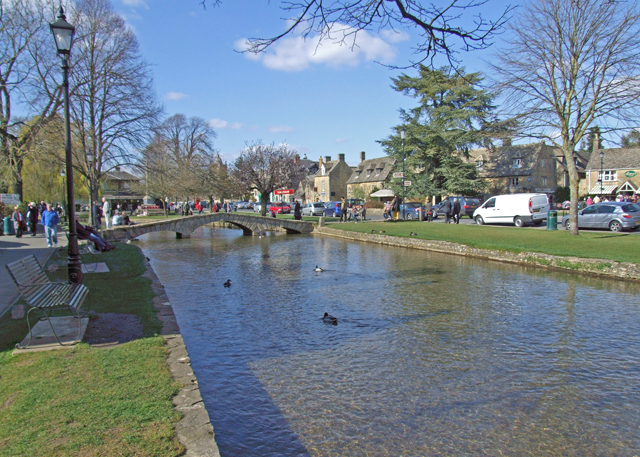
- Bridge over the River Windrush

- Location within Gloucestershire
- Population: 3,296
- OS grid reference: SP167209
- District: Cotswold
- Shire county: Gloucestershire
- Region: South West
- Country: England
- Sovereign state: United Kingdom
- Post town: Cheltenham
- Postcode district: GL54
- Dialling code: 01451
- Police: Gloucestershire
- Fire: Gloucestershire
- Ambulance: South Western
- UK Parliament: North Cotswolds

Bourton-on-the-Water (/ˈbɔːrtən/) is a village and civil parish in Gloucestershire, England, that lies on a wide flat vale within the Cotswolds Area of Outstanding Natural Beauty. The village had a population of 3,296 at the 2011 census. Much of the village centre is a designated Conservation Area.

== Description ==
Bourton-on-the-Water's high street is flanked by long wide greens and the River Windrush that runs through them. The river is crossed by five low, arched stone bridges. They were built between 1654 and 1953, leading to the nickname of "Venice of the Cotswolds".

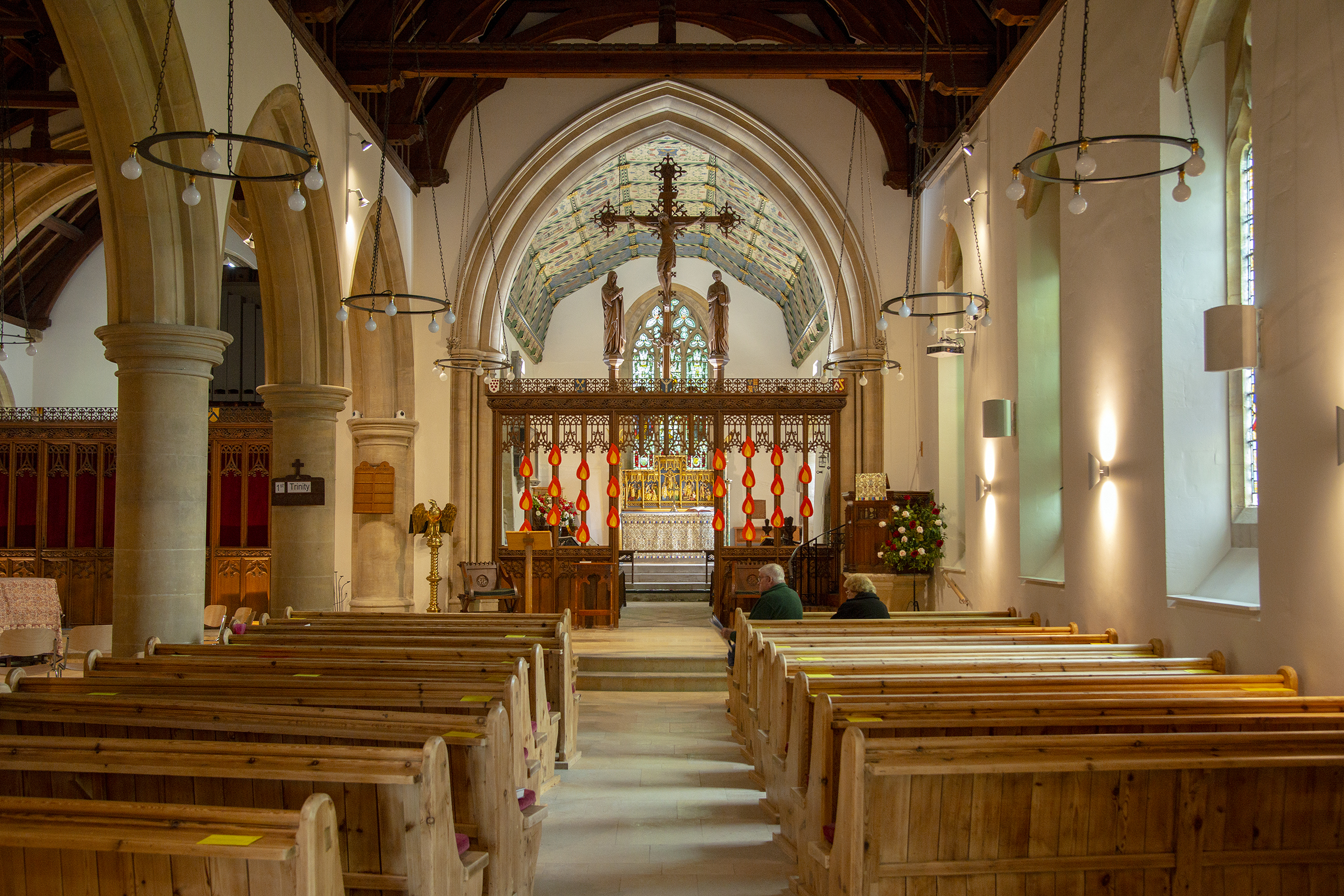
St Lawrence Church interior

The village often has more visitors than residents during the peak tourist season. Some 300,000 visitors arrive each year as compared to under 3,500 permanent residents.

There are three churches, Our Lady and St Kenelm Roman Catholic Church, Bourton-on-the-Water Baptist Church and St Lawrence, Church of England. The latter is usually open to visitors during the week. It is a Grade II listed building. A part of it was built in the 14th century but major modifications were made in the 1780s and in the late 1800s.

Educational institutions include Bourton-on-the-Water Primary School and the Cotswold School, a co-educational comprehensive school.

== Governance ==
An electoral ward of the same name exists and includes Cold Aston in addition to Bourton. The total population of the ward at the 2011 census was 3,676. The village itself had 3,296 people; the estimated population in mid-2016 was 3,482.

Bourton-on-the-Water parish is bounded by the Fosse Way along the northwest, while the eastern boundary is defined by a series of brooks, namely Slaughter Brook, the River Dikler and the River Windrush. The southern boundary is associated with a watercourse that runs between Bourton Hill and Broadwater Bottom.

== History ==
The earliest evidence of human activity within the Bourton-on-the-Water area was found in the Slaughter Bridge gravel-spread, where Neolithic pottery (dated c. 4000 B.C.) was discovered. Moreover, excavations of the Salmonsbury Camp give evidence of almost continuous habitation through the Neolithic period, the Bronze Age and throughout England's Roman period (c. 43 to 410 A.D.). A Roman road, Icknield Street (also known as Ryknild Street), ran from the Fosse Way at Bourton-on-the-Water to Templeborough in South Yorkshire. Ancient Roman pottery and coins discovered in the village itself give clear evidence of extended Roman occupation. By the 11th century a Christian church, Norman, was established and the village had developed along the River Windrush much as it is today. Centuries earlier, a Saxon timber church was located on that site in about AD 708, built on the site of an old Roman temple. Some of the St Lawrence church on that site today was built in the 14th century but most of it is from the 17th and 18th centuries.

The village was served by a passenger railway between 1862 and 1962. Tourism did not become a significant factor in the village until the 1920s and 1930s. The Model Village opened in 1937. There was a significant increase in the population between 1931 and 1951.

Following the formation of the Territorial Force in 1908, the town, for recruiting, was granted to the Royal Gloucestershire Hussars. Following this formation the regiment maintained a troop from B Squadron. Today the regiment, now a squadron of The Royal Wessex Yeomanry, continues to recruit from this area.

The Cotswold School opened in the village in 1988 following the amalgamation of Bourton Vale Secondary Modern (Bourton on the Water) and Westwood's Grammar School (Northleach). It achieved academy status in September 2010, and was named 'Comprehensive School of the Year 2015/16' by The Sunday Times. During construction of the school's maths block, it was discovered to be situated upon a Roman cemetery which also contained Iron Age roundhouses, burials, and pottery.

The houses and shops in the village are constructed of the ashlar yellow limestone characteristic of the Cotswolds and they have embellishments such as projecting gables, string-courses, windows with stone mullions, dripmoulds and stone hoodmoulds over the doors.

Parts of the James Bond movie Die Another Day (2002) were filmed in the car park at Bourton-on-the-Water and on the nearby ex-RAF aircraft runway at RAF Little Rissington.

== Special designations ==
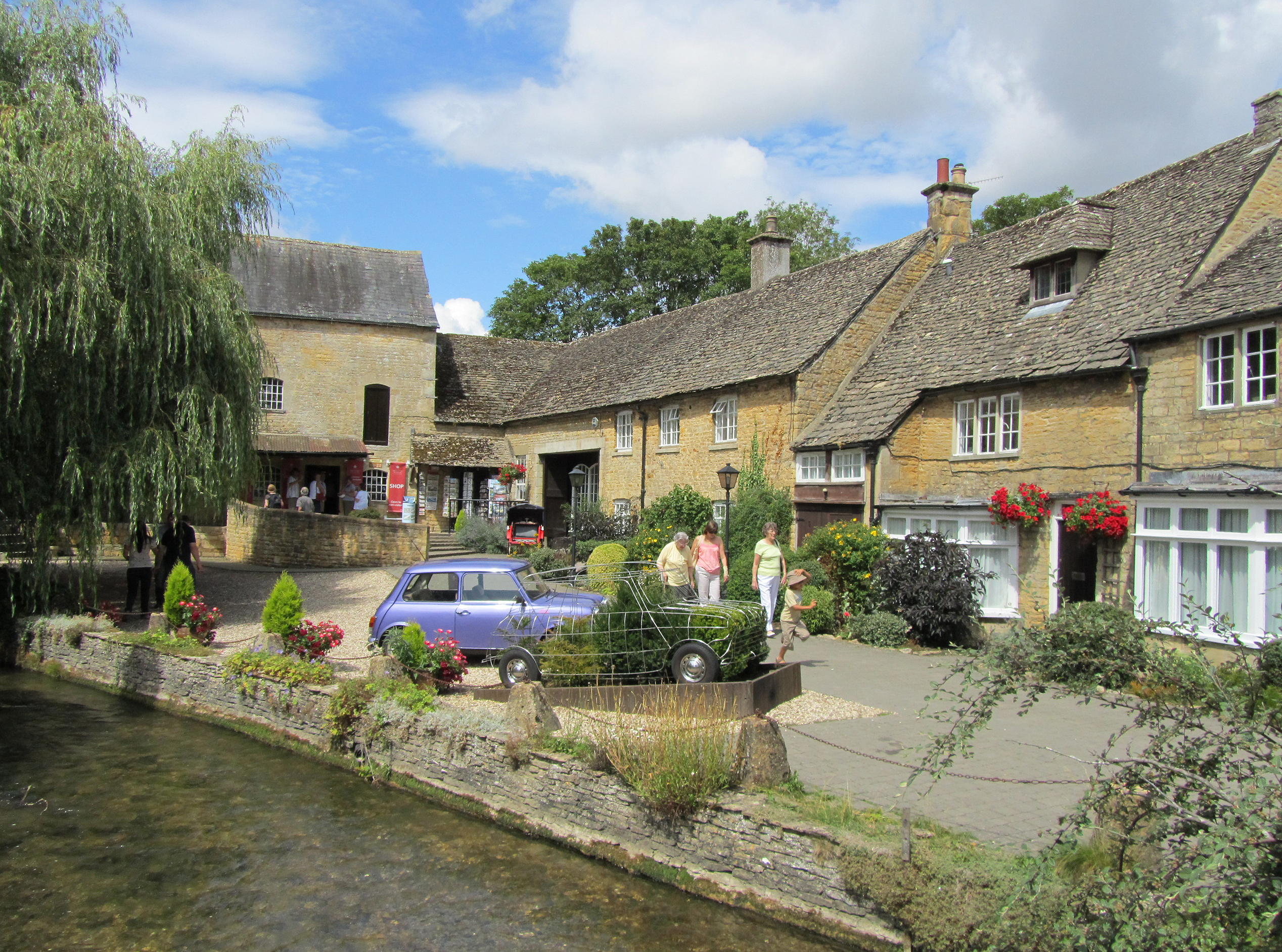

The small historic core of Bourton-on-the-Water along with associated areas along the River Windrush have been designated a UK Conservation Area.

Salmonsbury Camp, a nearby Iron Age habitation, is designated a UK National scheduled monument (SAM 32392).

English Heritage designates 114 buildings within Bourton-on-the-Water; all have Grade II or Grade II* listed status. (Grade II* indicates particularly important buildings of more than special interest.)

== Tourism ==
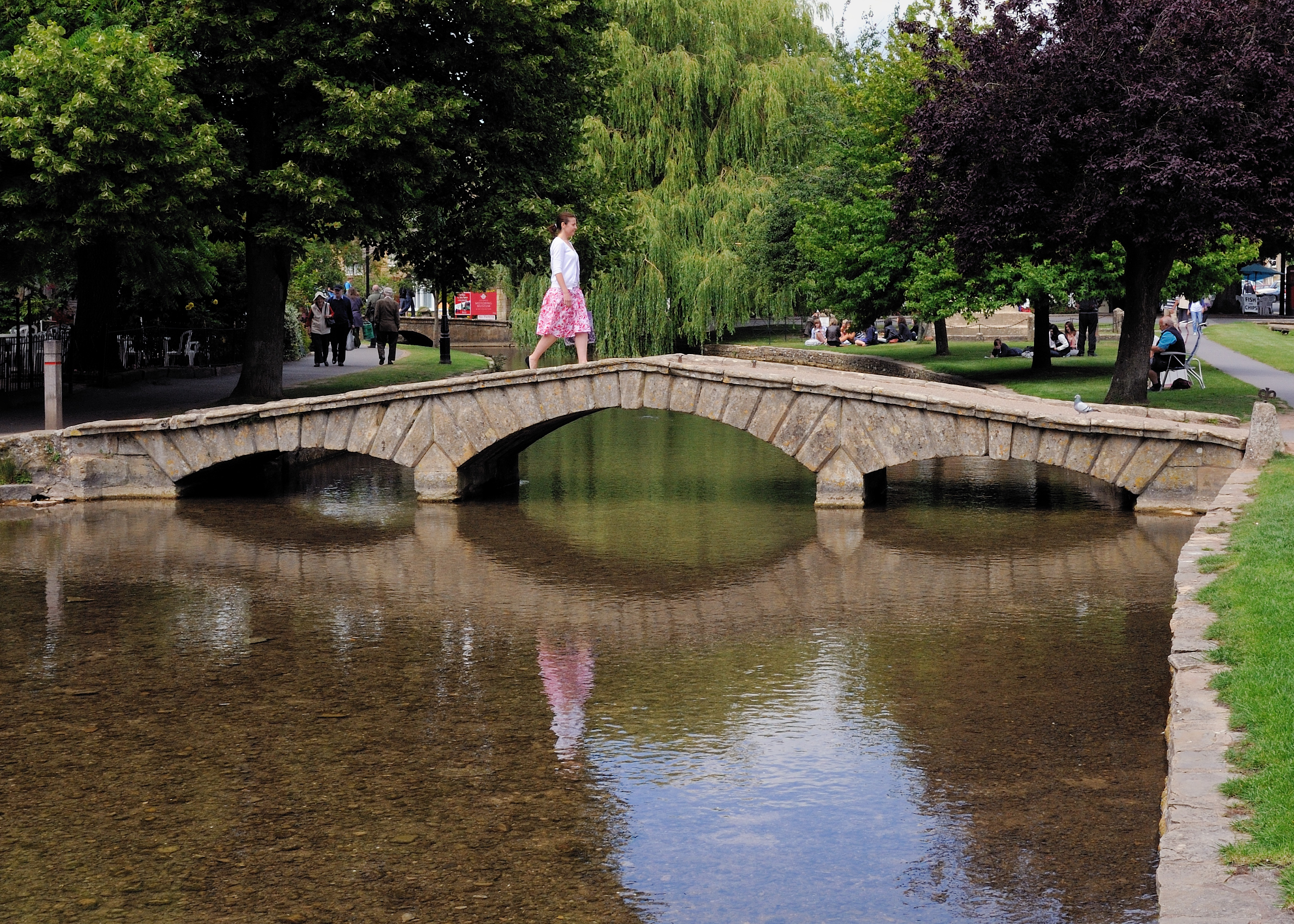
One of the bridges in the village

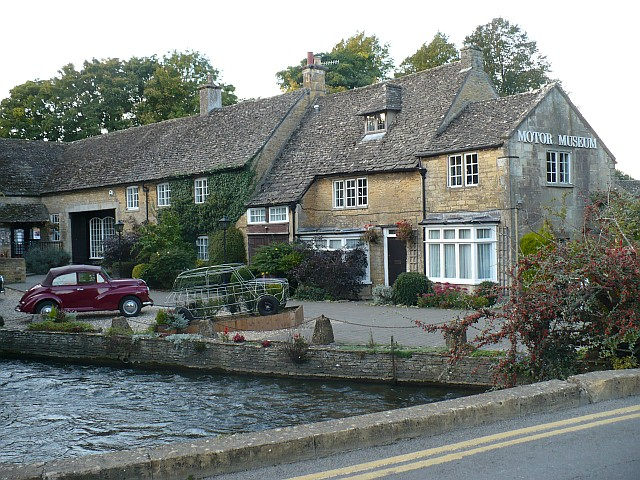
The motor museum

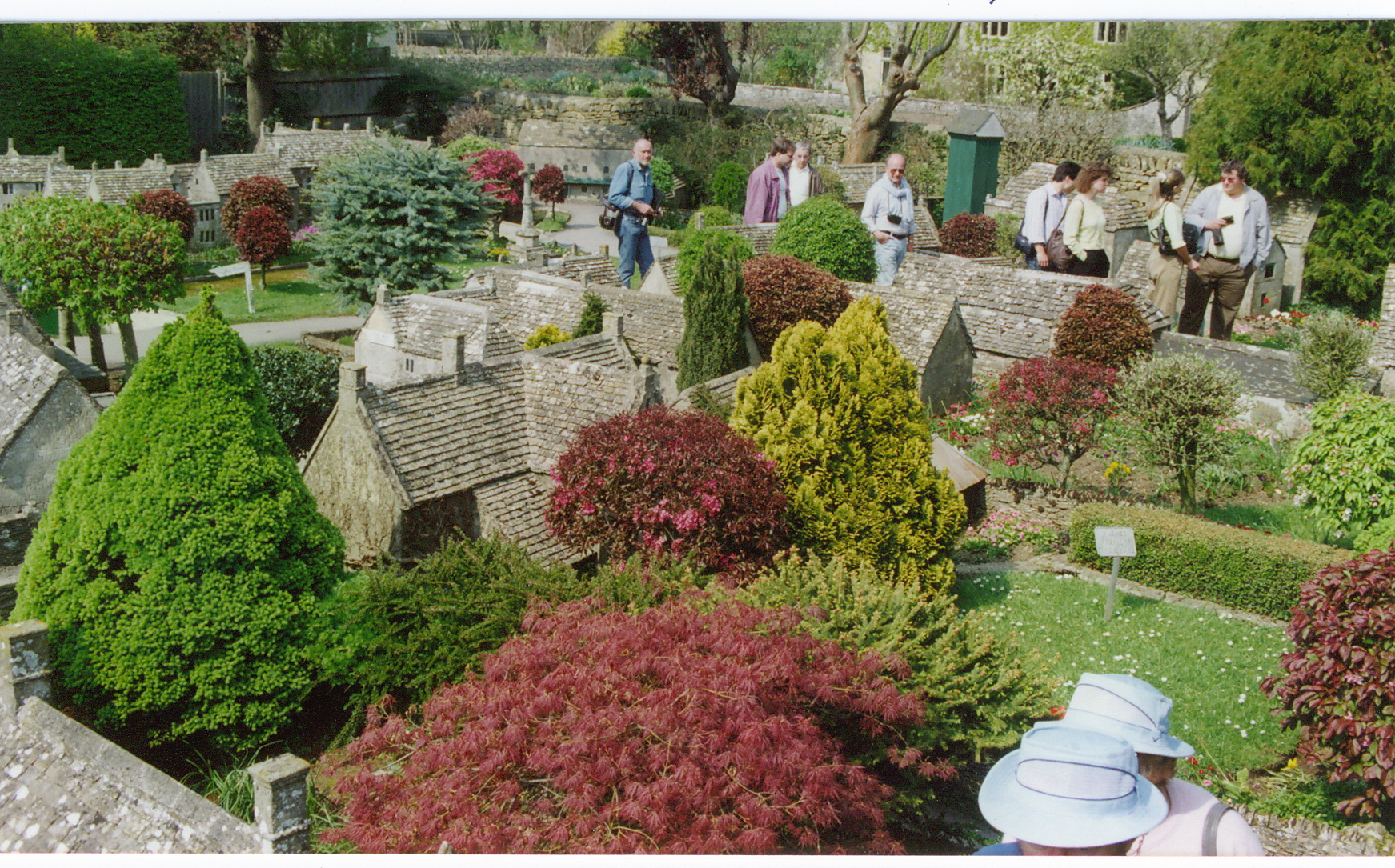
The model village

Bourton has a number of tourist attractions:

- During the summer, a game of medieval football is played with goalposts set up in the River Windrush itself. Two teams play with a standard football and a referee attempts to keep order. Crowds line the banks of the river and the aim is to score as many goals as possible (while getting everyone else as wet as possible).
- The model village is a 1:9 replica of the village and includes a model of the model village itself (a model within a model). It was built by local craftsmen in the 1930s, and opened in 1937. The model village was awarded Grade II listed status in 2013 in recognition of its uniquely precise details and the genuine building materials and methods used, which replicate those used in the construction of the life-size village.
- The model railway
- The Cotswold Motoring Museum (home of Brum)
- Birdland Park and Gardens, which has a collection of birds, including penguins, parrots and passerine (perching) birds and a large pond full of salmon which can be fed by the public. There are bird-of-prey displays and a penguin feeding demonstration.
- The Dragonfly Maze, designed by Kit Williams
- On the fourth Sunday of each month, there is a farmers' market
- Oasis' music video "I'm Outta Time" was recorded in the town, and shows Liam Gallagher walking in the countryside of the area, and in the model village and the town.
- The village was home to Hartwells Ironmongers which, among other things, supplied tourists and locals with puncture repair kits and food for the river fowl. The shop closed in 2025 after 220 years continuous operation, making it the oldest shop in Gloucestershire. The business had previously spawned a number of offshoots, including a national motor dealership chain of the same name.

Long-distance footpaths and local walks start, finish or pass through Bourton-on-the-Water. One such route that begins its 100-mile route north is the Heart of England Way.

== Sport ==
The village has its own non-league football club, Bourton Rovers, who play in the Hellenic Football League at the Rissington Road ground.

== Media ==
Local news and television programmes are provided BBC South and ITV Meridian. Television signals are received from the Oxford TV transmitter and the local relay transmitter situated in Icomb. Local radio stations are BBC Radio Gloucestershire, Heart West, Greatest Hits Radio South West, WRFM (Witney Radio) and Cotswolds Radio, community based radio station The town is served by the local newspaper, Cotswold Journal.

== Railway ==
Bourton-on-the-Water was first served by rail with the opening of the Bourton-on-the-Water railway in 1862. This was a branch line from Kingham on the Oxford, Worcester and Wolverhampton Railway (OWWR). The station was situated just to the north of the village. The OWWR (and its branch) later amalgamated with the Great Western Railway (GWR) and, in 1881, the branch was extended westwards and formed part of the GWR's Banbury and Cheltenham Direct Railway. The station closed to passengers in 1962 and to goods in 1964.

The closest operating railway station now is in Moreton-in-Marsh. The heritage Gloucestershire Warwickshire Railway uses part of the route of the former Great Western Railway's main line in the Cotswolds; it does not pass through the village.

== Notable people ==
- Actor Wilfrid Hyde-White was born in Bourton-on-the-Water in 1903.
- Major-general Dudley Johnson, British Army officer and Victoria Cross recipient, was born here in 1884 and fought in the First World War (1914–18).
- Racing cyclist Sharon Laws, who competed in the 2008 Summer Olympics, grew up in the village.
- Composer Edwin Ransford
