= Huntsman's Quarry =

Geological Site of Special Scientific Interest in Gloucestershire, England

- Site of Special Scientific Interest
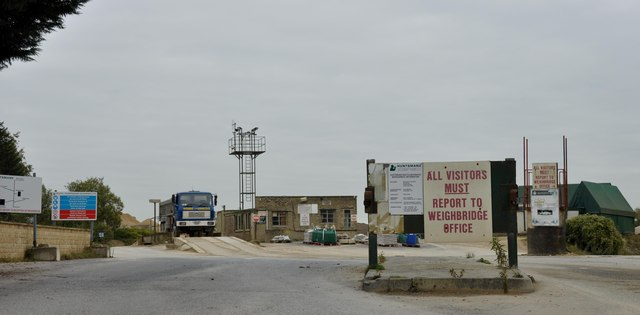
- The main entrance and weighbridge at Huntsmans Quarry

- Location within Gloucestershire
- Location of Huntsman's Quarry.
- Area of search: Gloucestershire
- Grid reference: SP125259
- Coordinates: 51.931923°N 1.81888°W
- Interest: Geological
- Area: 1.6 ha (4.0 acres)
- Notification date: 1974

Huntsman's Quarry (grid reference SP125259) is a 1.6-hectare (4.0-acre) geological Site of Special Scientific Interest in Gloucestershire, notified in 1974. The site is listed in the 'Cotswold District' Local Plan 2001-2011 (on line) as a Key Wildlife Site (KWS) and a Regionally Important Geological Site (RIGS).

== Location and geology ==
The site lies in the Cotswold Area of Outstanding Natural Beauty and provides significant exposures of the Cotswold Slate facies of the Middle Jurassic period in the county. These slates have yielded a rich and diverse fauna and flora for research over a long period of time. These include the remains of reptiles such as turtles, crocodiles, dinosaurs and pterosaurs. Also found have been fish, starfish, barnacles, insects and biovalves. The site has also provided ammonites of significant biostratigraphical importance. The site has on-going potential for research into sediments and the environment of the area during the Middle Jurassic.

== SSSI Source ==
- Natural England SSSI information on the citation
- Natural England SSSI information on the Huntsman's Quarry unit
