= Cotswold Motoring Museum =

Transport museum in Gloucestershire, England

Coordinates: 51°53′5″N 1°45′33″W

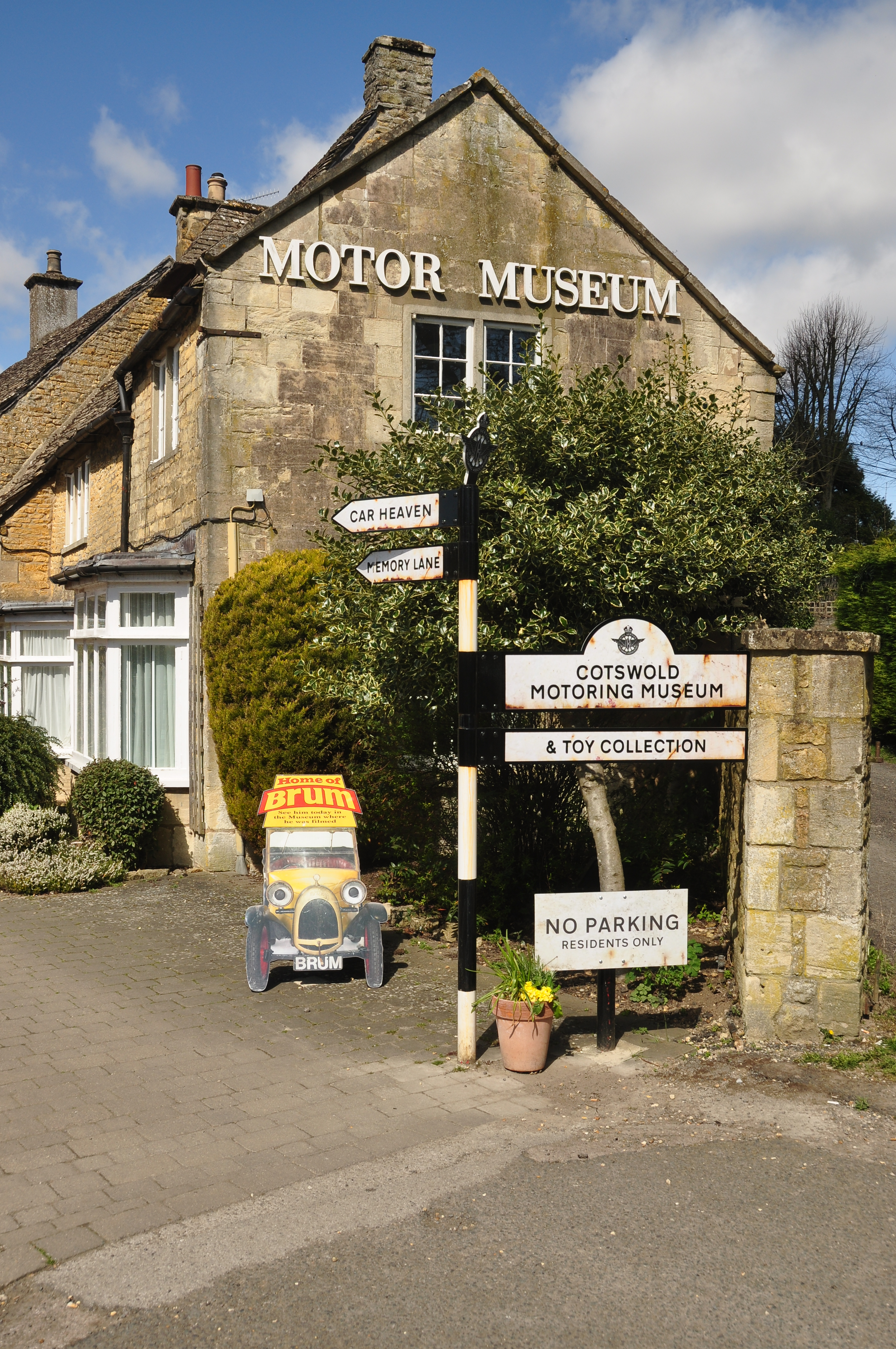
- Established: 1978
- Location: Bourton-on-the-Water, Gloucestershire, England
- Type: Transport Museum
- Website: www.cotswoldmotoringmuseum.co.uk

The Cotswold Motoring Museum is a museum in the Cotswolds village of Bourton-on-the-Water, Gloucestershire, England. It features motoring history of the 20th century.

== Collection ==
The museum's collection includes cars, motorcycles, bicycles, tricycle, caravans, and other motoring memorabilia of the 20th century.

The museum's toy collection includes pedal cars, bicycles, tricycles, toy cars, buses, aeroplanes and many other vehicles, model kits, meccano built into vehicles and structures, wooden and metal vehicles, and penny tin toys.

The collection also includes the children's television star Brum that is featured in the first two series and opening titles. The museum also features in the show's opening title sequence as Brum leaves the museum, where he is on display, and heads into the Big Town. It also features in the closing title sequence as well, when Brum drives back into the museum.

== History ==
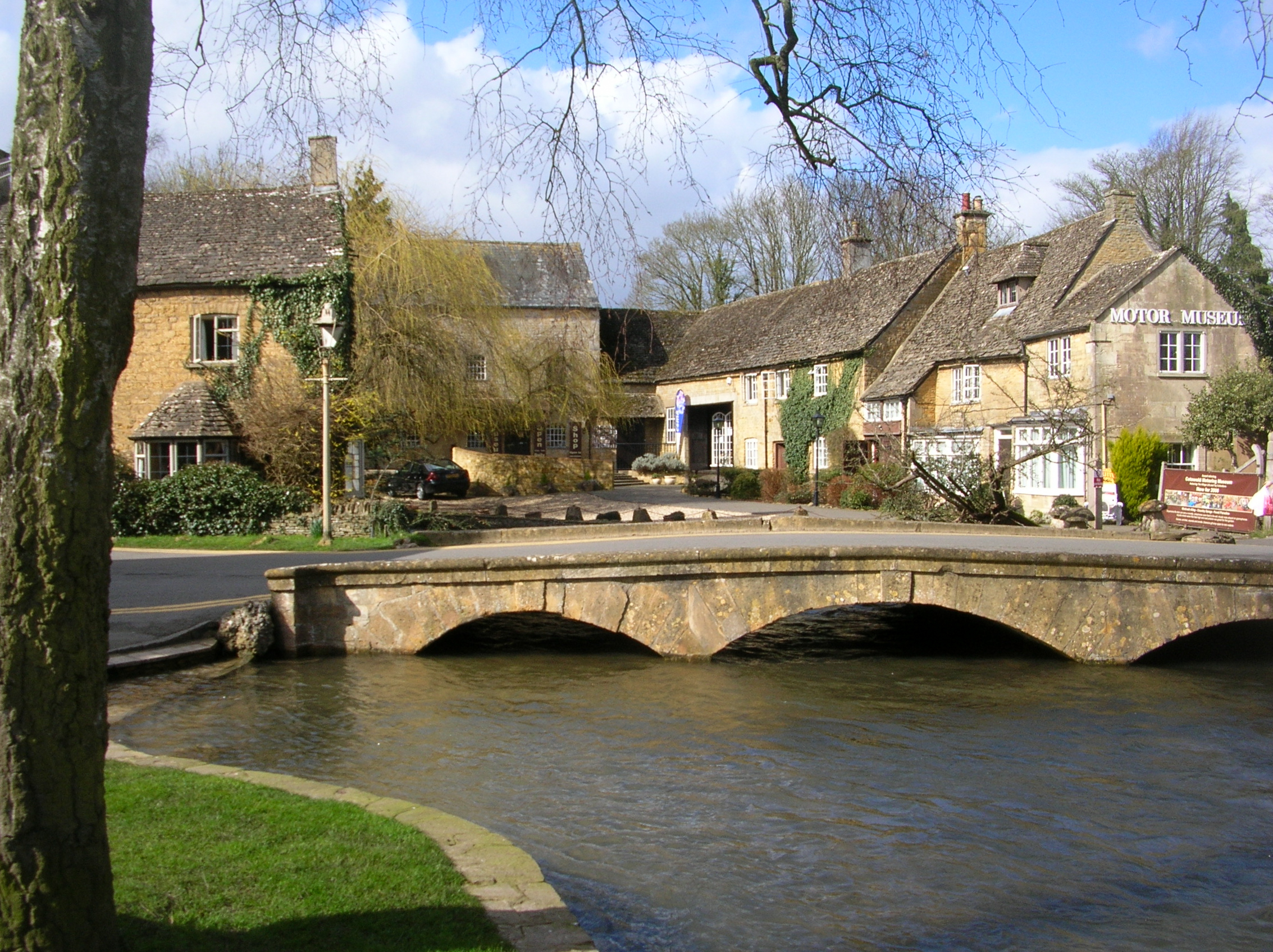
The museum building

The museum was founded in 1978 by car collector Mike Cavanagh, who also featured in the children's TV series Brum. In 1999, Cavanagh sold it to the Civil Service Motoring Association, a not-for-profit organisation, who continues to run it to this day.

== Awards ==
In 2003, the Museum won the Heart of England Tourist Board's Visitor Attraction of the Year, and in 2004, they won the Museums and Heritage Award for their interpretation project "Big Ideas for Small Children".

== Notes ==
- "Never mind the 00S, remember this little lot?". Gloucestershire Echo. Gloucestershire Media. 31 March 2008.
