= The Old Mill =

- Poster for The Old Mill
- Directed by: Wilfred Jackson
- Written by: Dick Huemer
- Produced by: Walt Disney
- Music by: Leigh Harline
- Animation by: Clyde Geronimi; Hamilton Luske; Jack Kinney; Eric Larson
- Color process: Technicolor
- Production company: Walt Disney Productions
- Distributed by: RKO Radio Pictures
- Release date: November 5, 1937
- Running time: 9 minutes
- Country: United States
- Language: English

The Old Mill is a Silly Symphonies animated short film produced by Walt Disney, directed by Wilfred Jackson, scored by Leigh Harline, and released theatrically by RKO Radio Pictures on November 5, 1937. The film depicts the natural community of animals populating an old abandoned windmill in the country, and how they deal with a severe summer thunderstorm that nearly destroys their habitat.

The Old Mill was the first Silly Symphony cartoon to be released by RKO and was given a new Silly Symphony logo, some new titles, and a burlap background which was used for several other Disney theatrical cartoon series like Donald Duck, Goofy, Mickey Mouse, and Pluto the Pup.

Like many of the later Silly Symphony shorts, The Old Mill was a testing ground for advanced animation techniques. Marking the first use of Disney's multiplane camera, the film also incorporates realistic depictions of animal behavior, complex lighting and color effects, depictions of wind, rain, lightning, ripples, splashes and reflections, three-dimensional rotation of detailed objects, and the use of timing to produce specific dramatic and emotional effects. All of the lessons learned from making The Old Mill would subsequently be incorporated into Disney's feature-length animated films, such as Snow White and the Seven Dwarfs (1937), which was released a month later, as well as Pinocchio (1940), Fantasia (1940) and Bambi (1942).

In 2015, The Old Mill became the second Silly Symphonies short (after Three Little Pigs) to be selected by the United States Library of Congress for preservation in the National Film Registry as being "culturally, historically, or aesthetically significant".

== Awards and accolades ==
The Old Mill won the 1937 Academy Award for Best Short Subjects: Cartoons. It was included as #14 in the book The 50 Greatest Cartoons As Selected by 1,000 Animation Professionals.

== Homages ==
=== Disney California Adventure ===
The Old Mill is featured in the World of Color show at Disney California Adventure.

=== Disneyland ===
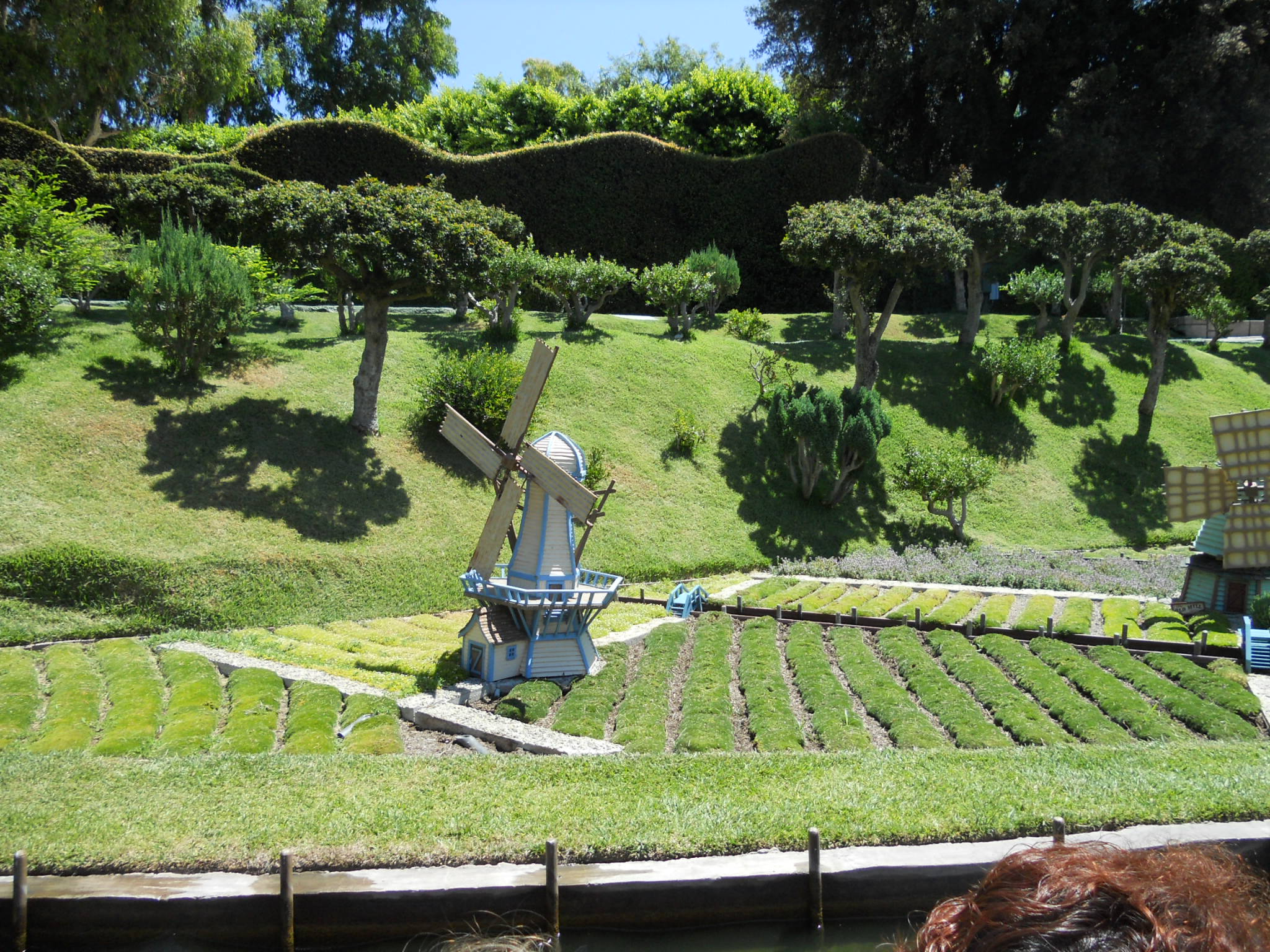
Two of the three windmills at Disneyland.

The mill from the short, and two others, were seen in miniature on the Storybook Land Canal Boats ride at Disneyland. Beginning December 20, 2014, they were replaced by landmarks from Disney's 2013 animated musical film Frozen. The miniature windmills were put into storage by Walt Disney Imagineering.

==== Disney Springs at Walt Disney World ====
The double wheel act in Cirque du Soleil & Disney's Drawn to Life is inspired by The Old Mill, and includes projections from the original cartoon throughout the act. The double wheel represents the windmill itself, as shown by the projections during the act. The acrobats are also dressed as owls inspired by the original cartoon.

=== Disneyland Paris ===
The Old Mill is represented at Fantasyland at Disneyland Paris by a building resembling a Dutch windmill, which serves drinks and snacks.

=== Magic Kingdom ===
A homage to The Old Mill was included on Tom Sawyer Island at the Magic Kingdom. Inside Harper's Mill, there was an owl and a bluebird's nest inside a broken cog in the mill's gears.

=== The Simpsons ===
The Old Mill was parodied in the 2006 The Simpsons episode "Bart Has Two Mommies", where Homer tries to win a rubber duck race by making his rubber duck cross the finish line first. The duck however floats to an abandoned windmill very similar to the one in the Disney short, with a sign declaring "The Old Mill". The scene where the duck is nearly squashed by the water wheel is a direct reference to the most famous scene of The Old Mill. Raymond Scott's "Powerhouse B" is heard in the scene where Homer protects the duck from the water wheel.

== Voice cast ==
- Bird chirps: Louise Myers
- Doves: Elvia Allman
- Crickets: Jean MacMurray, Purv Pullen
- Frogs: Clarence Nash
- Quartet: Jerry Phillips, Elvia Allman, Marie Arbuckle, Mary Moder, Bea Hager, Marta Nielsen, Barbara Whitson

== Home media ==
The Old Mill was released on Laserdisc as part of The Academy Award Review of Walt Disney Cartoons in 1985.

It was released on December 4, 2001, on the Walt Disney Treasures: Silly Symphonies DVD set and on March 1, 2005, on the Bambi Platinum Edition DVD as a special feature. The short was released for the first time on Blu-ray on October 6, 2009, on the Snow White and the Seven Dwarfs Diamond Edition and would subsequently be re-released with Bambi as part of its Diamond Edition and Signature Collection releases on Blu-ray. The short is also available to watch on the streaming service Disney+.

== Influence ==
Japanese director Hayao Miyazaki has called The Old Mill his favorite Disney film.
