= Storybook Land Canal Boats =

Attraction at Disneyland theme parks

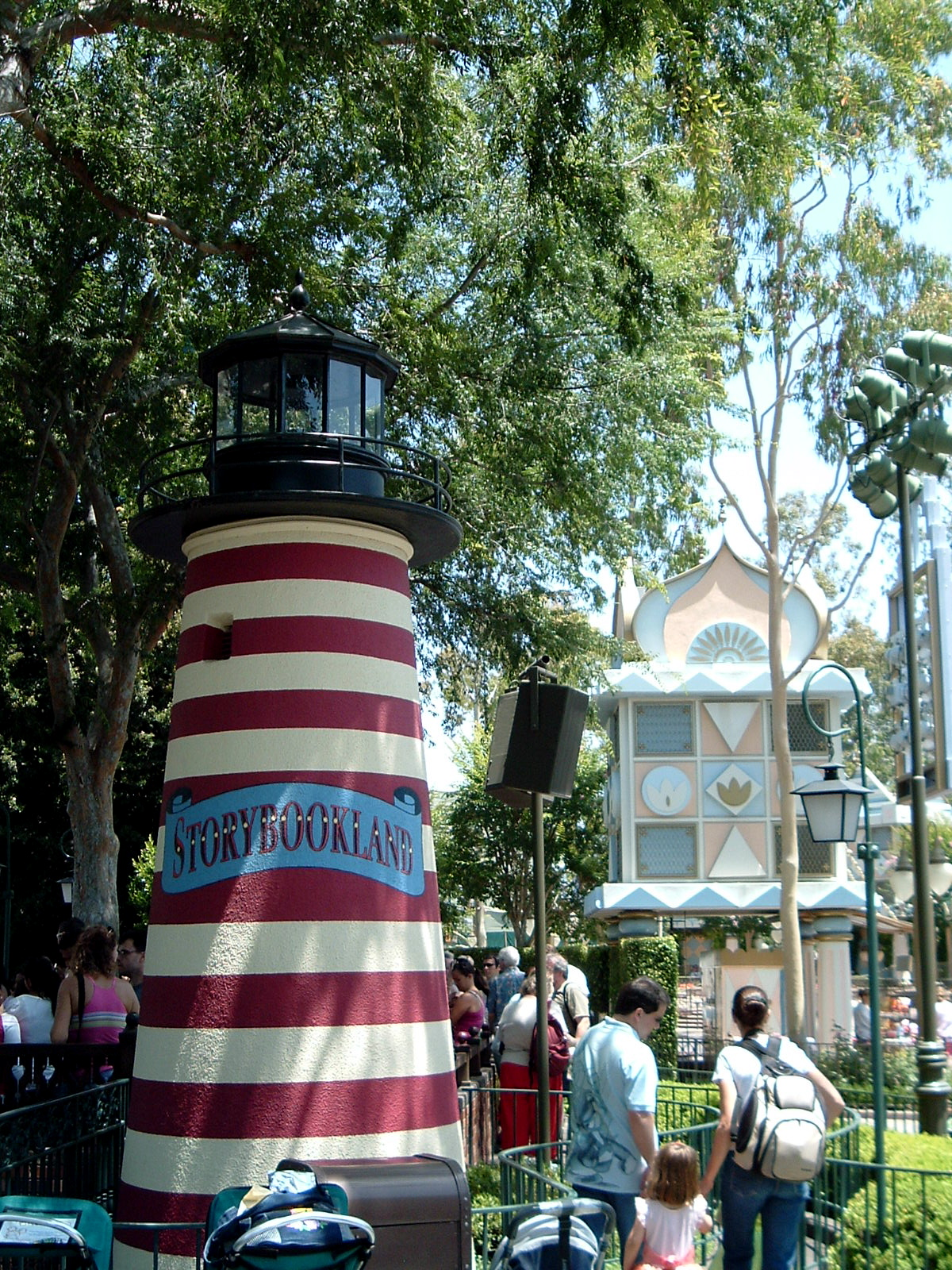
- Storybook Land Canal Boats entrance at Disneyland

Disneyland
- Area: Fantasyland
- Coordinates: 33.81377°N 117.91825°W
- Status: Operating
- Opening date: July 17, 1955

Disneyland Park (Paris)
- Area: Fantasyland
- Coordinates: 48.8753°N 2.77467°E
- Status: Operating
- Opening date: April 3, 1994

General statistics
- Type: Boat ride
- Designer: Walt Disney Imagineering
- Duration: 10 minutes
- Manufacturer: Intamin (Disneyland Park Paris only)
- Theme: Fairy tales
- Vehicle type: Narrowboat
- Vehicle capacity Vehicle Weight Empty. 2000lbs: 14 (Disneyland); 20 (Disneyland Park Paris)
- Sponsor: Vittel (Paris; 2024–present)
- Must transfer from wheelchair

Storybook Land Canal Boats is an attraction located at Disneyland and Disneyland Park (Paris). Passengers embark on a leisurely paced outdoor boat ride through a winding canal featuring settings from Disney animated films recreated in miniature. The Disneyland version was one of the original attractions when the park opened on July 17, 1955, although the miniature buildings and landscaping were not added until the following year. The Disneyland Park Paris version is named Le Pays des Contes de Fées (meaning "The Land of Fairy Tales" in French) and opened in the spring of 1994.

== History ==
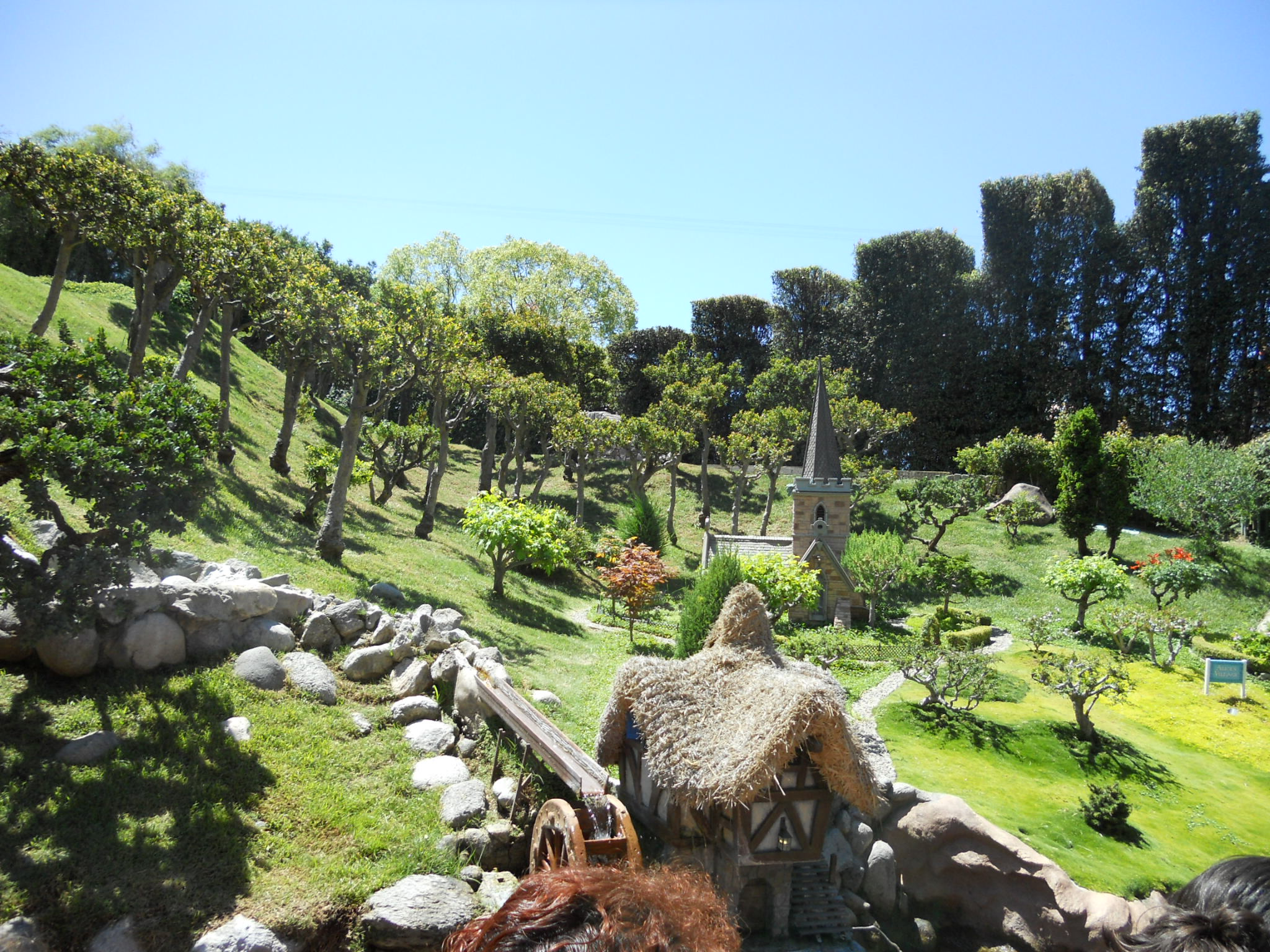
English church and watermill

The ride's concept dates back to Walt Disney's plans for a small park across the street from his Walt Disney Studios in Burbank, California. This modestly scaled, never-built amusement park was to include a gravity flow canal boat ride among its attractions.

When plans for Disneyland were being made, there was to be a "Lilliputianland", inspired by Madurodam, a miniature city in the Netherlands once visited by Disney. However, the technology did not yet exist to create the miniature animated figures that were to inhabit the "Lilliputian" village, so the canal ride opened under the name Canal Boats of the World. It was intended to be a journey past miniature recreations of the great landmarks of the world, but time and money prevented its completion. The ride was plagued by other problems; the outboard motors were prone to overheating, often forcing the boats to be pulled by hand, and because the attraction opened with little landscaping, it earned the nickname among park executives as "The Mud Bank Ride". After two months of operation, the Canal Boats closed while Storybook Land was constructed and the muddy banks were landscaped with miniature plants, including a bonsai tree planted by Walt Disney. The idea of having Monstro the whale consume the canal boats came from a never-implemented concept for a "Monstro the Whale" ride, in which small boats were to be swallowed by Monstro and then plunged down a watery path into a pond below.

The attraction reopened on June 16, 1956, under the new name Storybook Land Canal Boats. The models, scaled 1 inch to 1 foot, included Gepetto's village from Pinocchio, the Pigs' houses from Three Little Pigs, the Kensington Gardens from Peter Pan, Alice's cottage from Alice in Wonderland, the Old Mill from the 1937 Silly Symphony cartoon of the same name, Toad Hall from The Wind in the Willows from The Adventures of Ichabod and Mr. Toad, the diamond mine from Snow White and the Seven Dwarfs', and Cinderella's Castle.

Over the years several scenes have been added to and removed from the attraction. The Sultan's Palace from Aladdin appeared where the miniature Toad Hall from The Adventures of Ichabod and Mr. Toad had previously stood for a major refurbishment done in 1994. Toad Hall returned the following year in another location.

For the 50th anniversary of Disneyland in 2005, the Tinker Bell boat was painted gold and the lighthouse given a gold and maroon theme. Due to high demand, a second boat, Wendy, was painted gold and also renamed the Tinker Bell for the duration of the anniversary. Once the anniversary had concluded, both boats were repainted to their former appearance.

Beginning in December 2014, the attraction at Disneyland added the village of Arendelle from Disney Animation's 2013 film Frozen including Anna and Elsa's castle, Wandering Oaken's Trading Post, and Elsa's ice palace. These additions replaced the three Dutch windmills representing The Old Mill (1937).

In October 2025, it was announced that Rapunzel's Tower from Disney Animation's 2010 film Tangled would be added to the attraction at Disneyland when it reopened from refurbishment in Winter 2025.

== Disneyland version ==
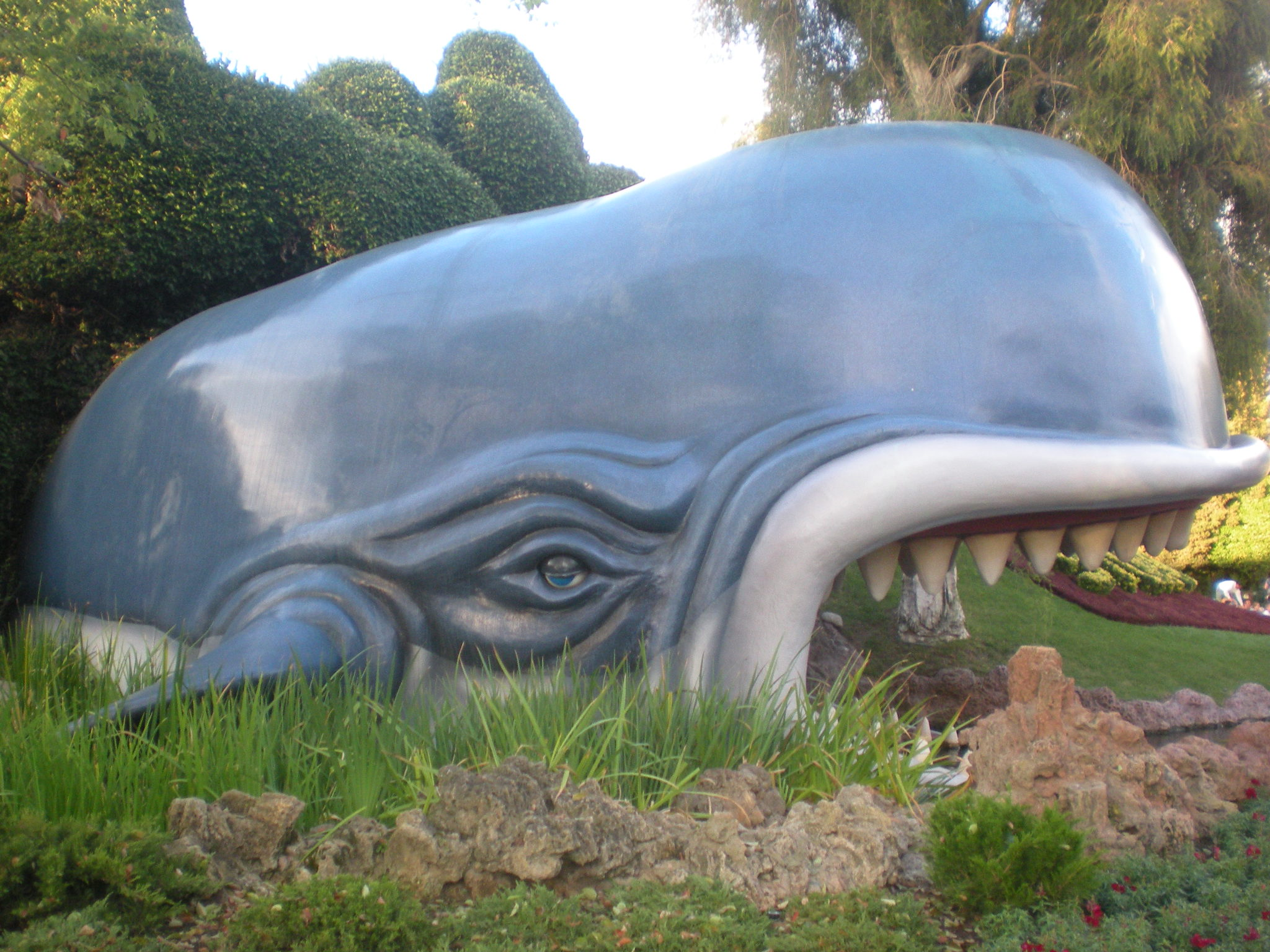
Monstro, eye partially closed

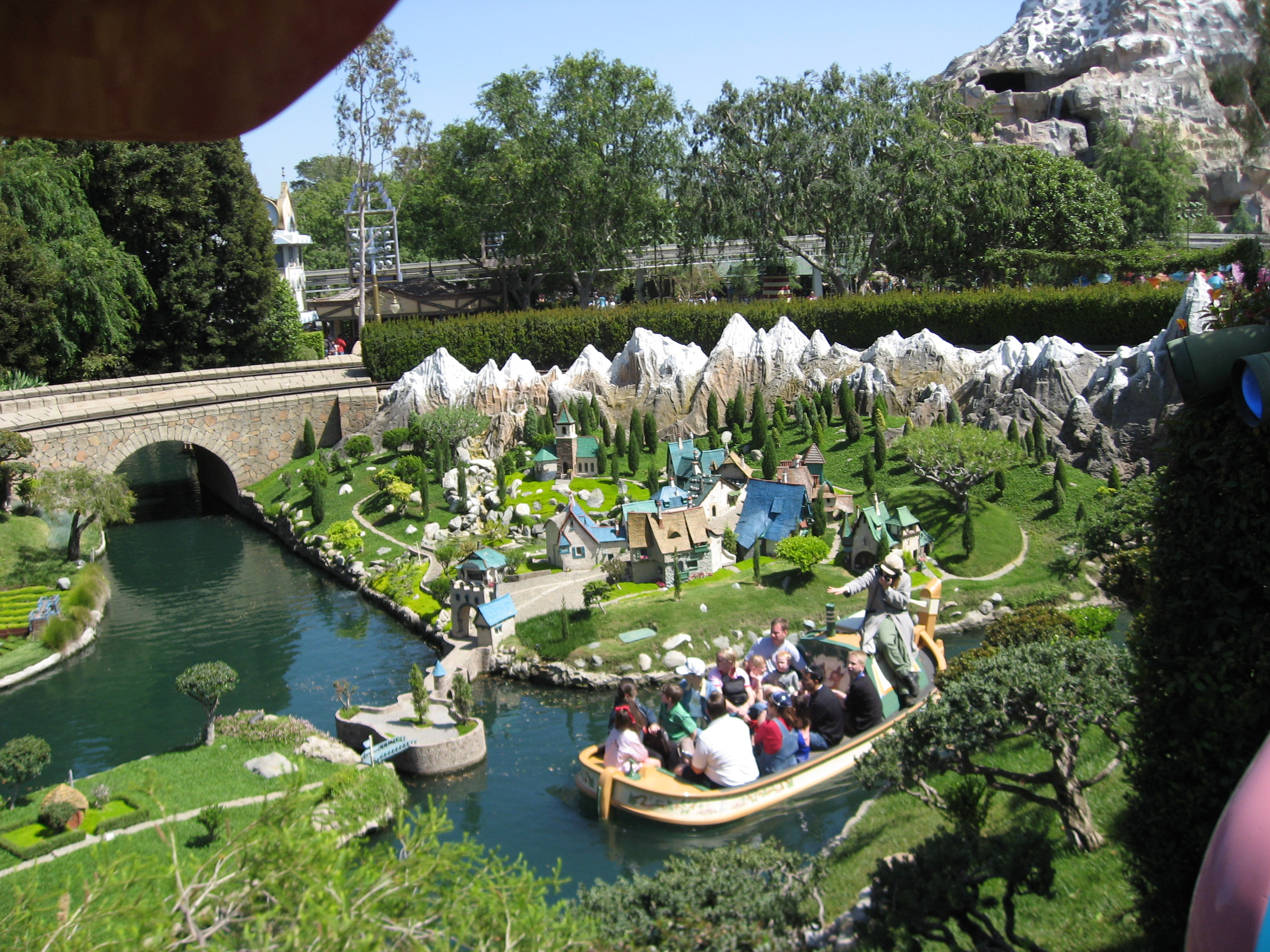
View of attraction from Casey Jr. Circus Train in 2007

Passengers enter the attraction through a chain queue that winds in front of the loading dock. A lighthouse at the queue's entrance was once a ticket booth from when Disneyland required tickets for riding individual attractions. Storybook Land Canal Boats originally required a "D" coupon.

The motor-driven boats are scaled-down replicas of Dutch, English, and French boats. All of the boats are named after female Disney characters except for Flower (retired), the male skunk from Bambi. Passengers are seated along the edges of the boat, facing inward, although children are sometimes permitted to ride on the front flat part of the boat. A costumed guide sits just above the passengers on the back of the boat, perched above the engine housing, and narrates the ride.

After departing from the dock, the boat passes through a short cave sculpted to look like Monstro, the whale that swallowed Pinocchio. Monstro is partially animated: his eye opens and closes, and periodically steam comes out of his blow hole.

The canals past the Monstro cave are landscaped with miniature trees and shrubs. Along the banks are small buildings representing the homes of characters from Disney animated films, although not all the locations were actually depicted in film. While no characters physically appear in the attraction, many of these settings feature sound recordings of characters singing.

The miniature settings include:

- The Three Little Pigs' houses and The Big Bad Wolf's home from Three Little Pigs
- An English village, with a church and the entrance to the White Rabbit's hole, from Alice in Wonderland
- Kensington Gardens from Peter Pan
- The Sultan's palace and the Cave of Wonders from Aladdin
- The dwarfs' diamond mine and cottage from Snow White and the Seven Dwarfs
- The French countryside village from Cinderella, featuring a gold-spired castle
- The patchwork quilt from Lullaby Land
- Rapunzel's Tower from Tangled
- Toad Hall and Mole End from The Adventures of Ichabod and Mr. Toad
- Village of Arendelle from Frozen, featuring Anna and Elsa's castle, Wandering Oaken's Trading Post, and Elsa's ice palace
- Cobblestone Alpine village with Geppetto's wood shop from Pinocchio
- Prince Eric's seaside castle and King Triton's underwater castle, partially hidden behind a waterfall, from The Little Mermaid

The boat then returns the passengers to the loading dock from which they boarded.

The attraction pauses operation during any fireworks shows, allowing riders to view the show from the canal. Normal operation resumes once the show has ended.

Names of the Canal Boats:

1. Alice
2. Ariel
3. Aurora
4. Belle
5. Cinderella
6. Daisy
7. Fauna
8. Faline
9. Flora
10. Jasmine
11. Merryweather
12. Snow White
13. Tinkerbell
14. Wendy

Storybook Land Canal Boats Queue Music

1. The Second Star to the Right from Peter Pan
2. Snow White Overture
3. Babes in Toyland Overture
4. Sleeping Beauty Overture
5. Darby O'Gill and the Little People Overture
6. Love is a Song / Little April Showers Medley from Bambi
7. A Dream Is A Wish Your Heart Makes / The Working Song Medley from Cinderella

=== Image gallery ===
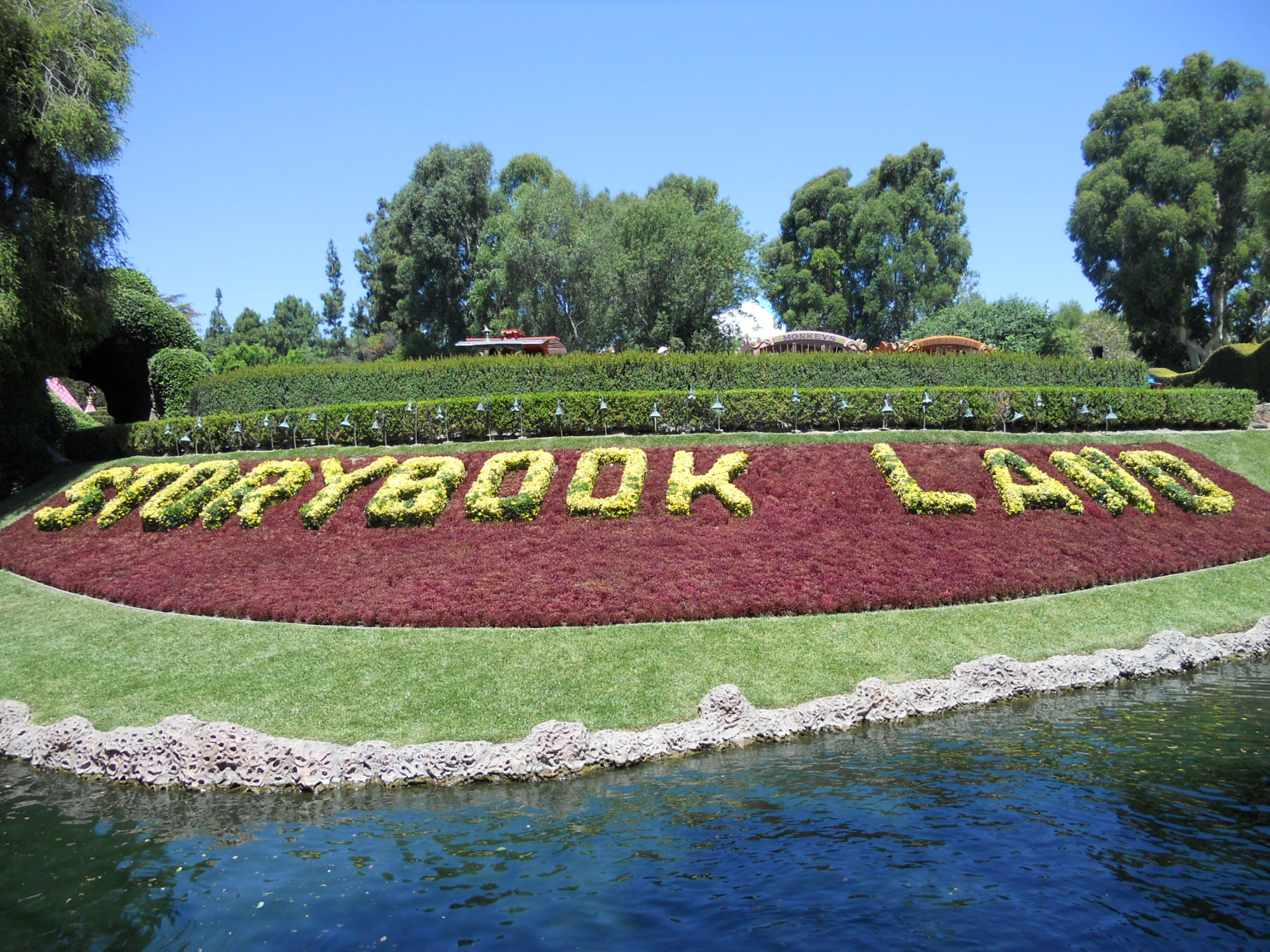
Words spelled out in bushes cut into letters

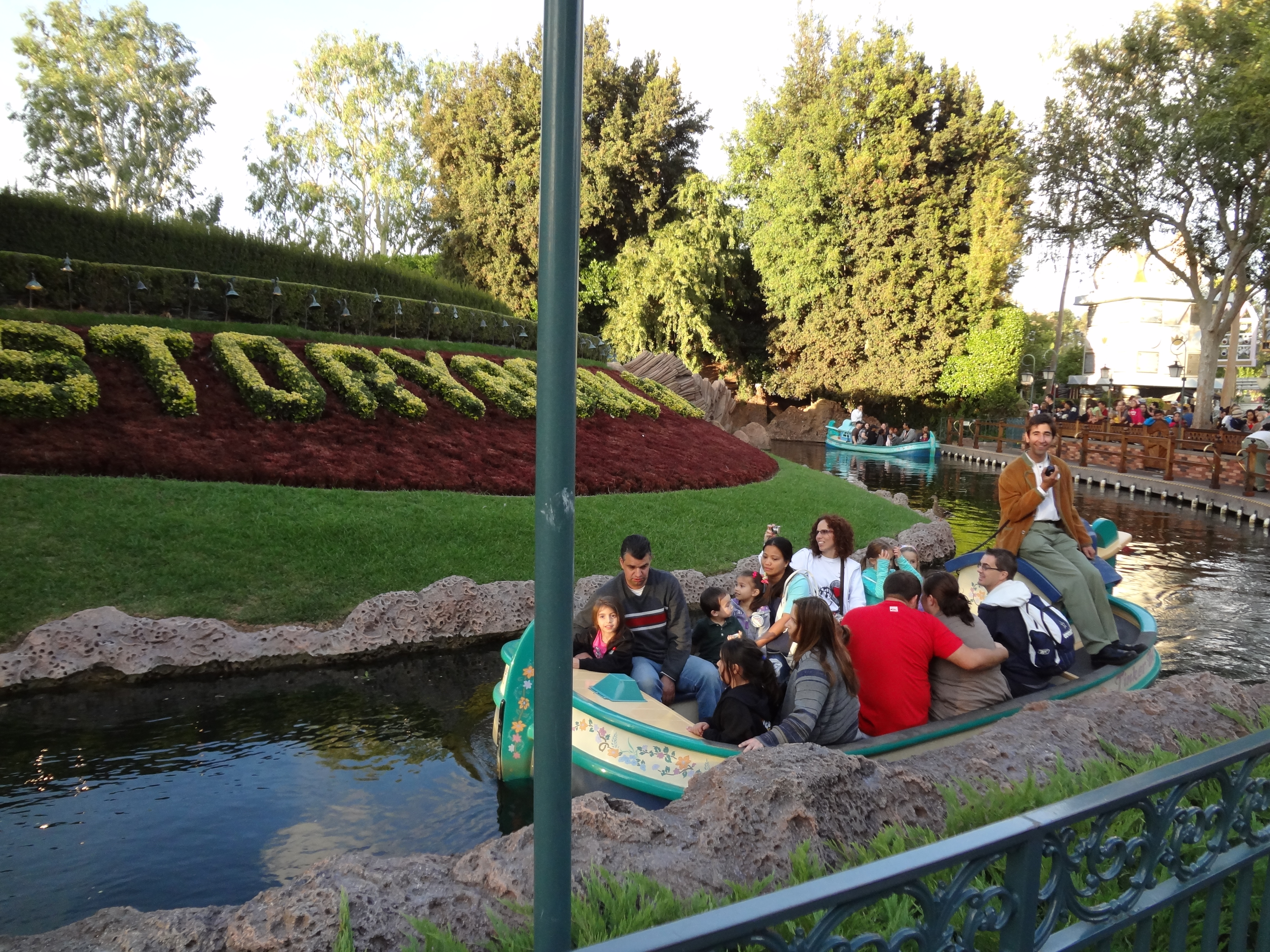
Beginning of the ride

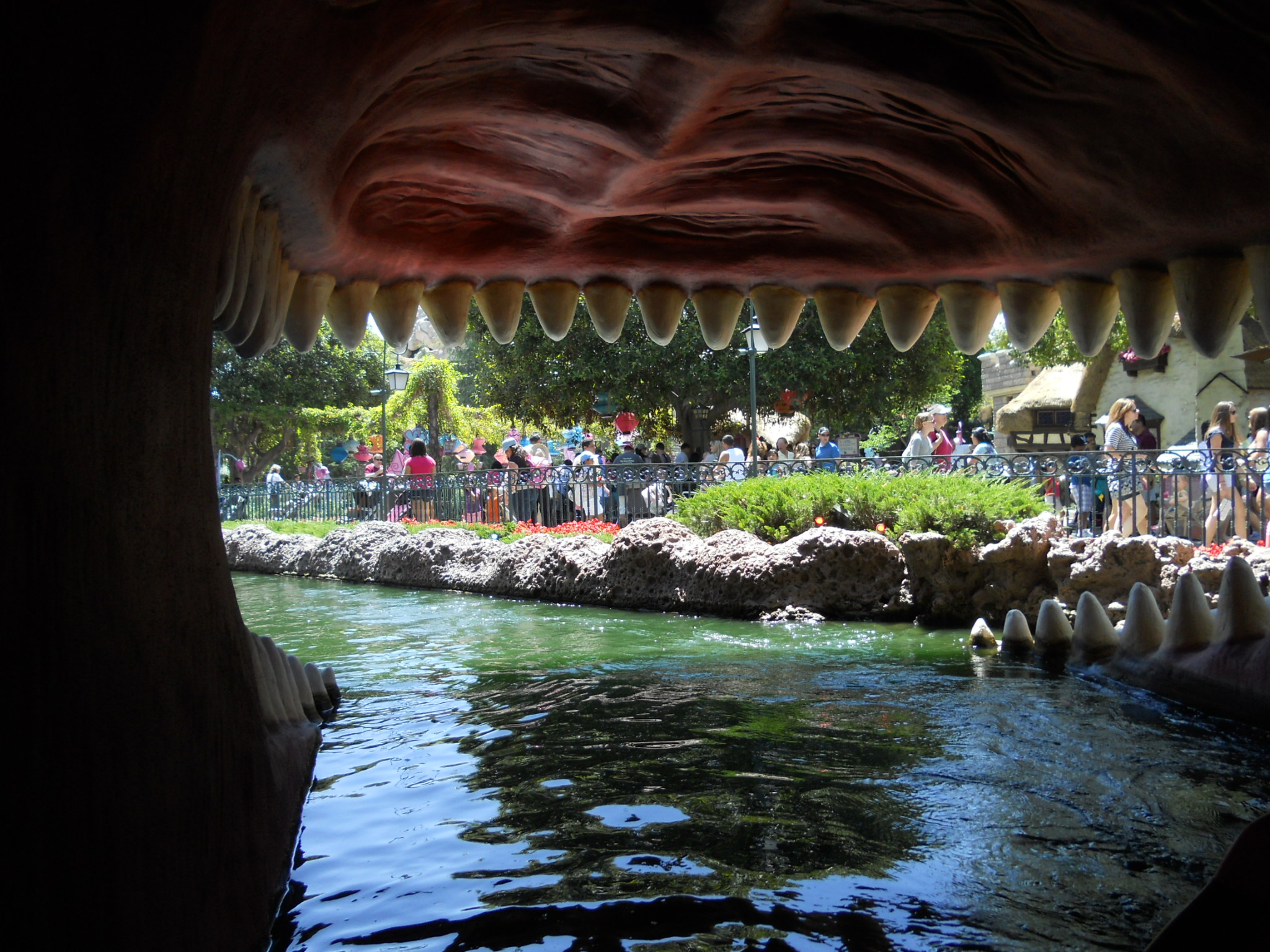
Traveling through Monstro's mouth

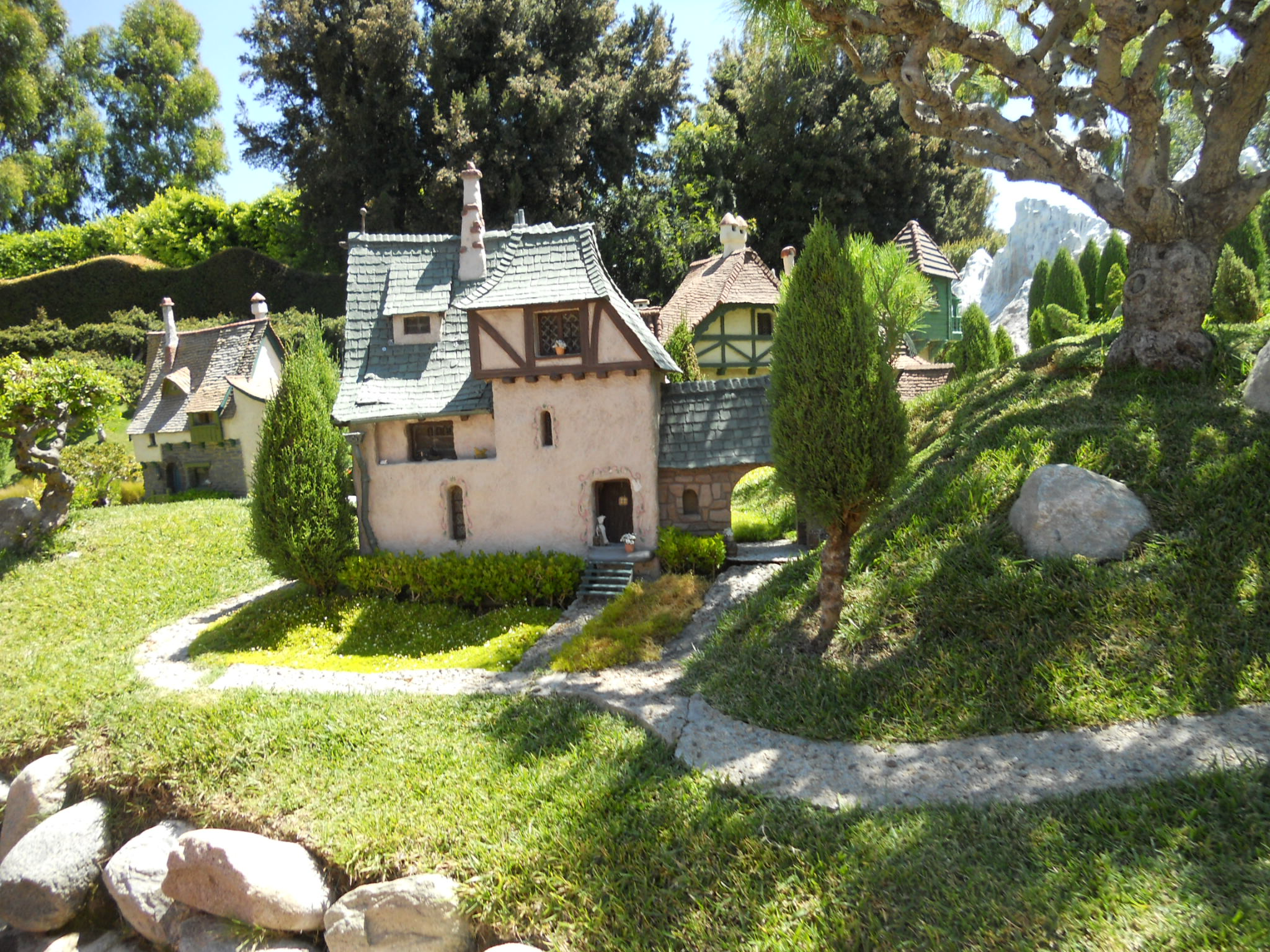
One of the first buildings encountered

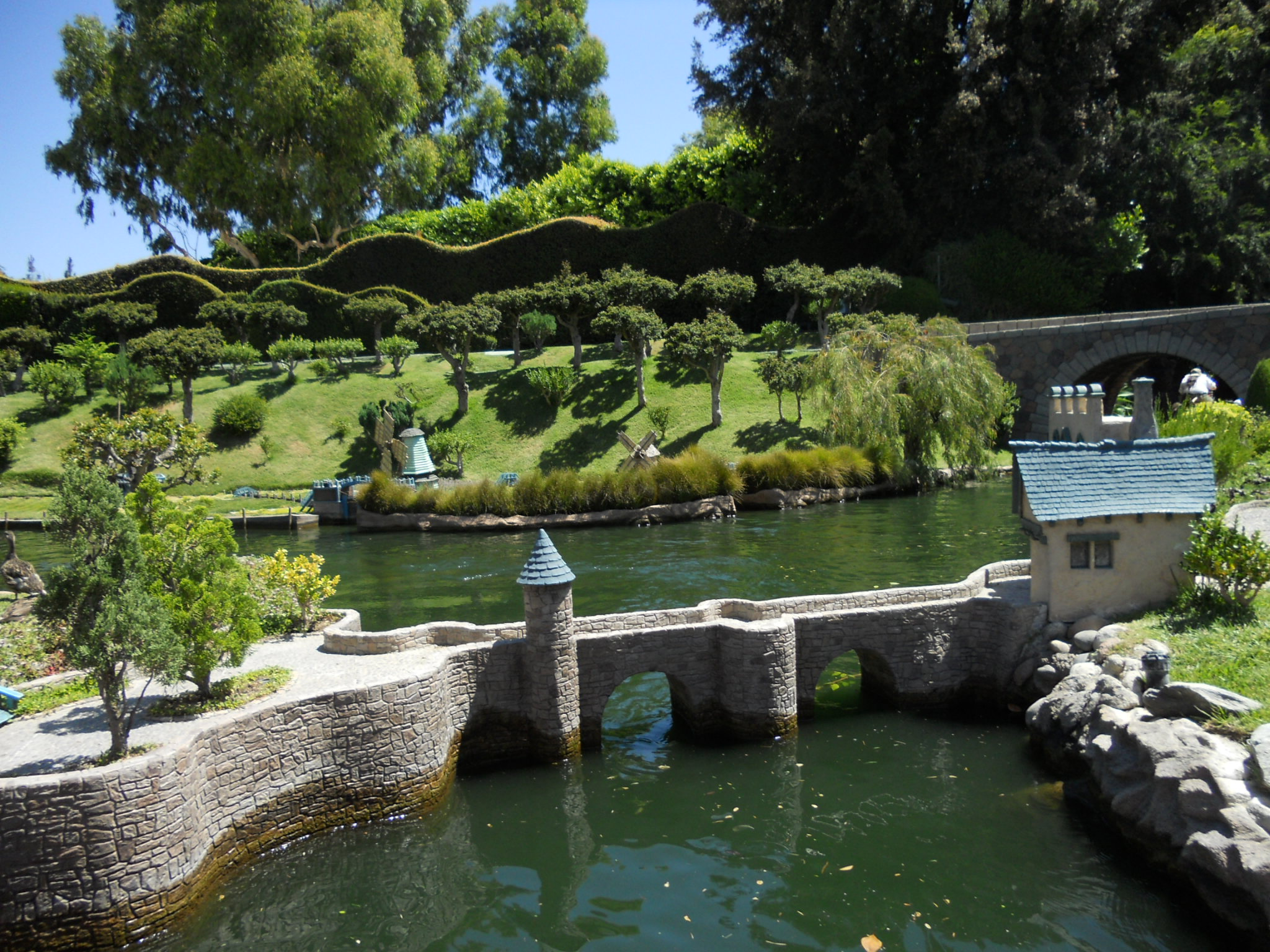
Bridge to the pigs' homes

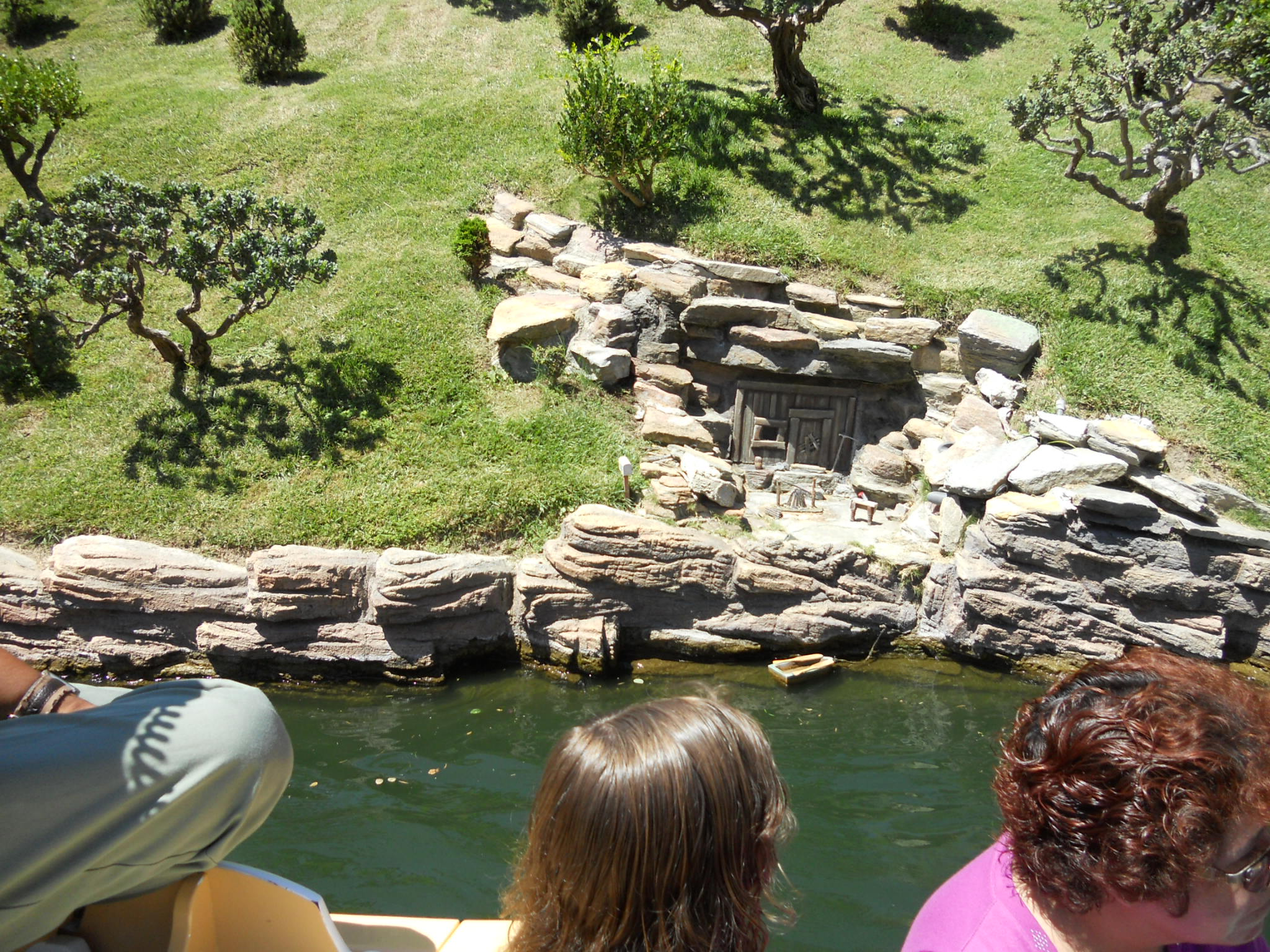
Home of the Big Bad Wolf

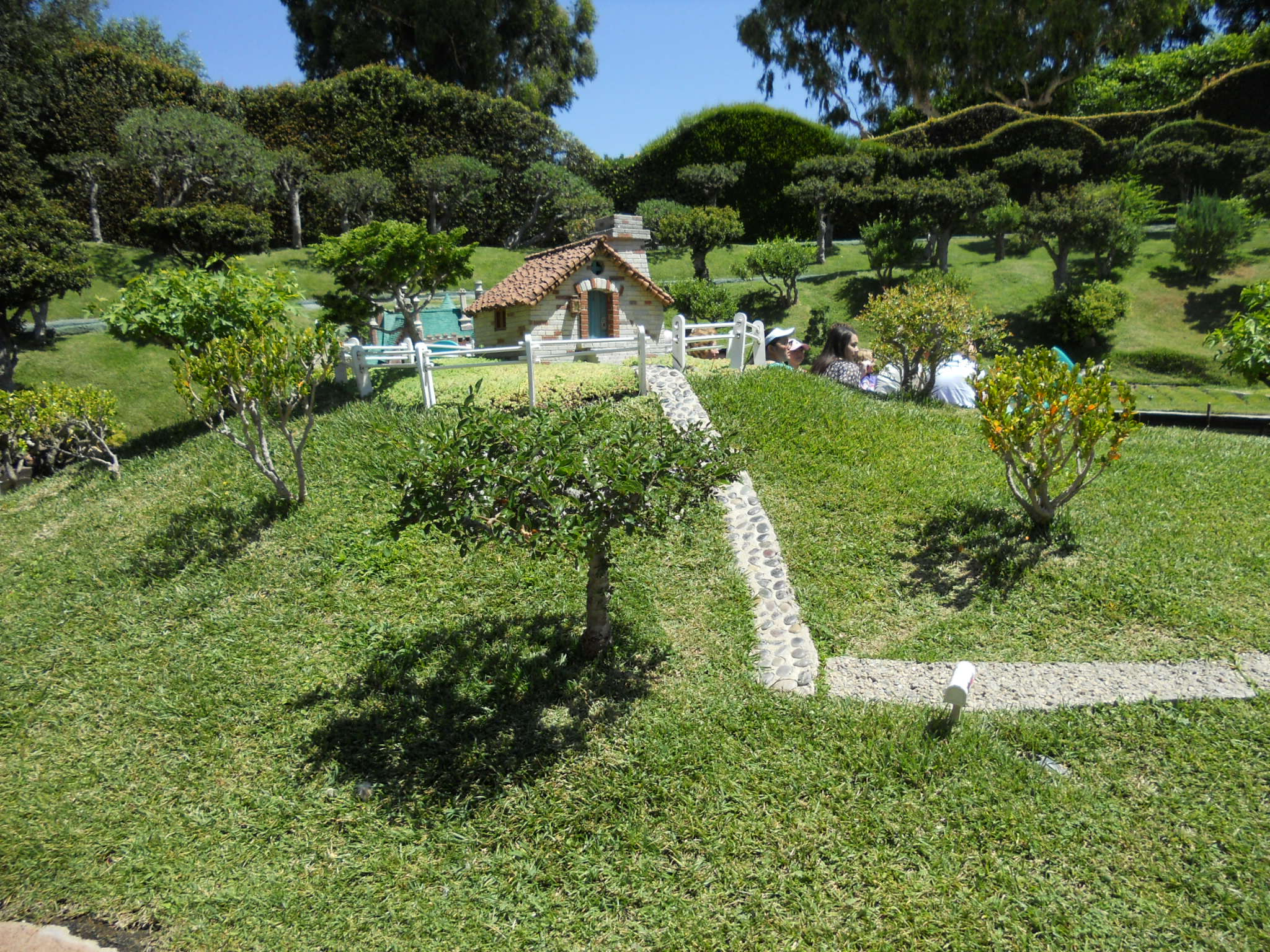
One of the Three Little Pigs' houses

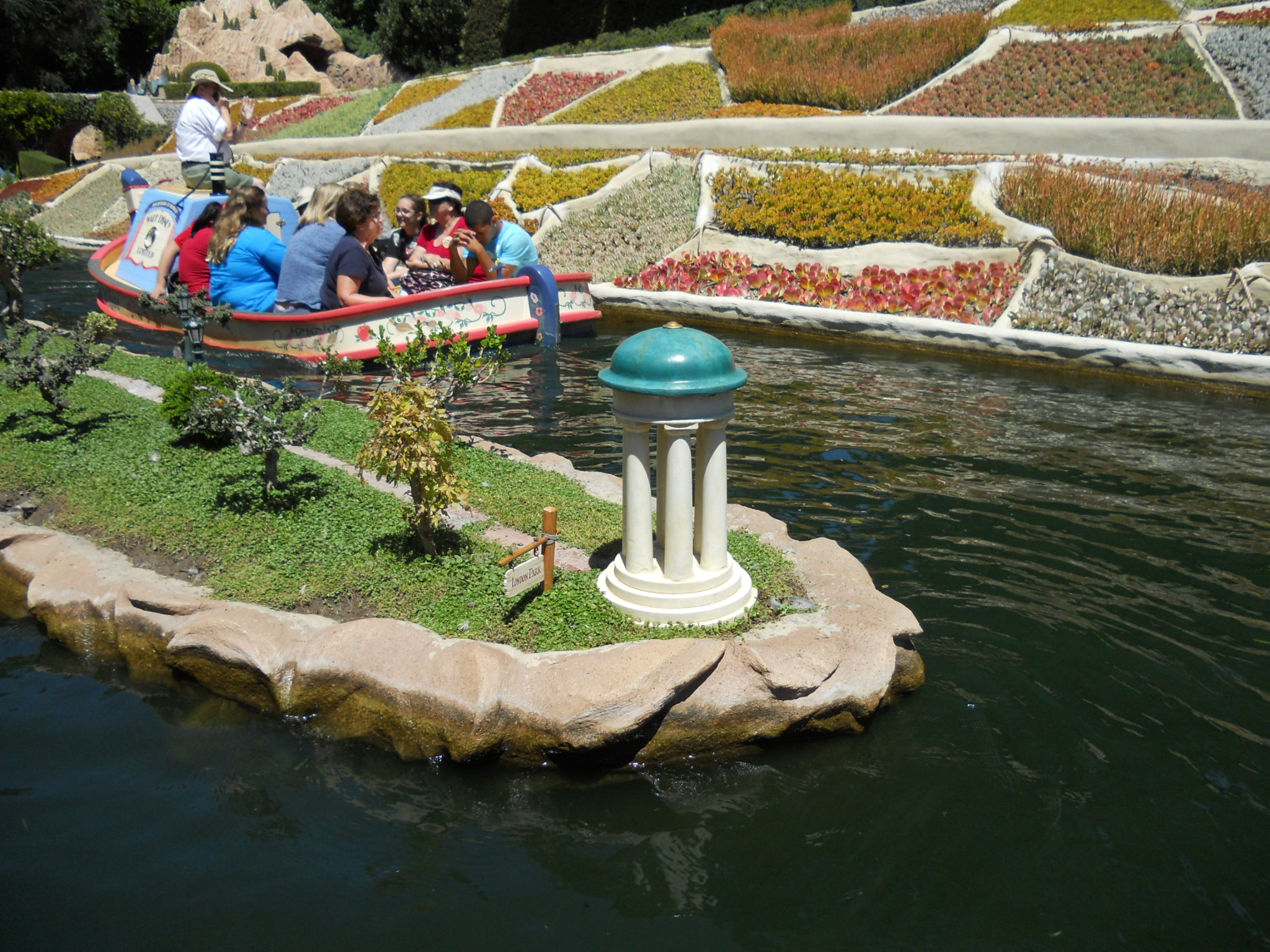
Kensington Gardens from Peter Pan

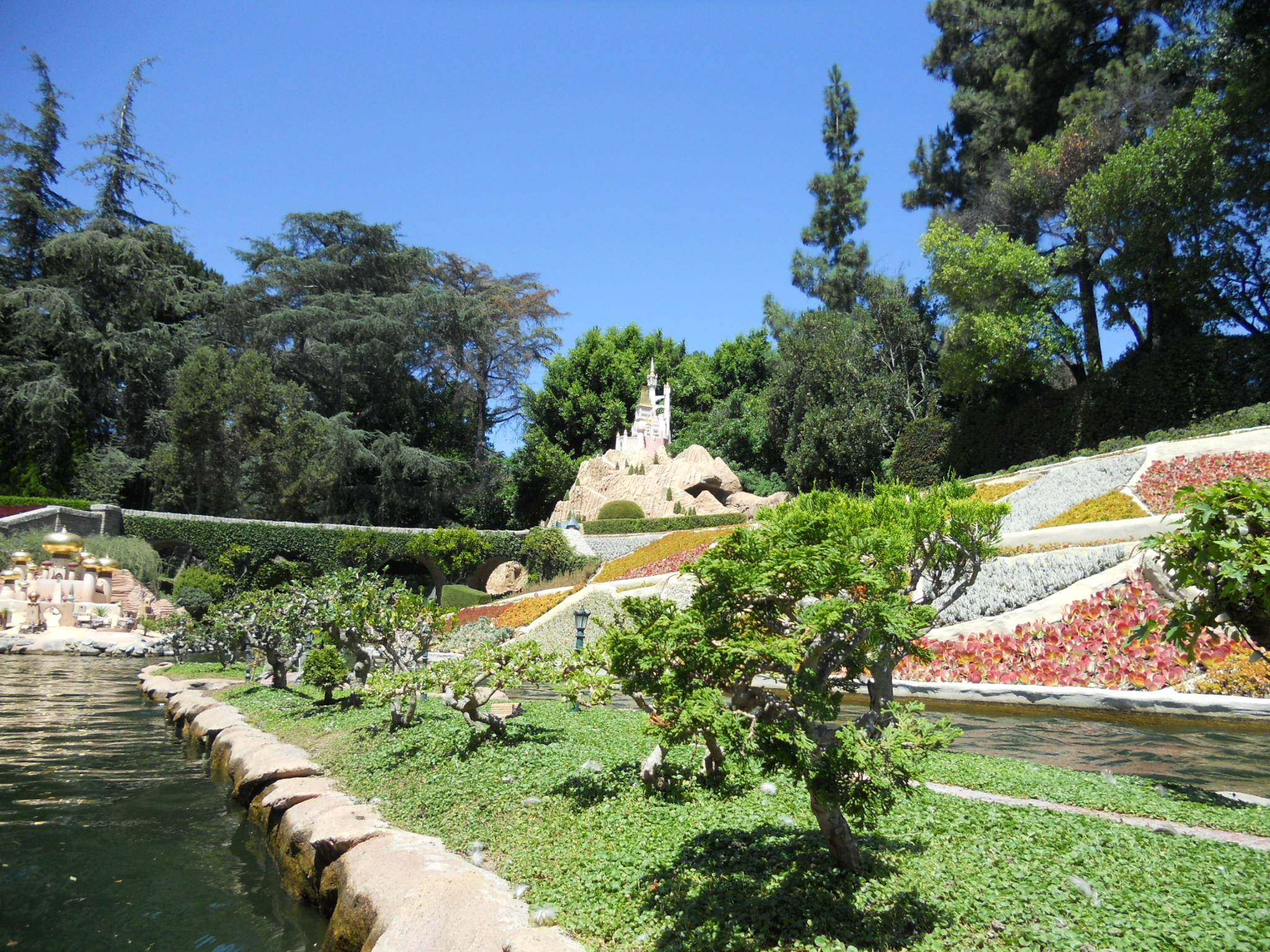
Cinderella's Castle

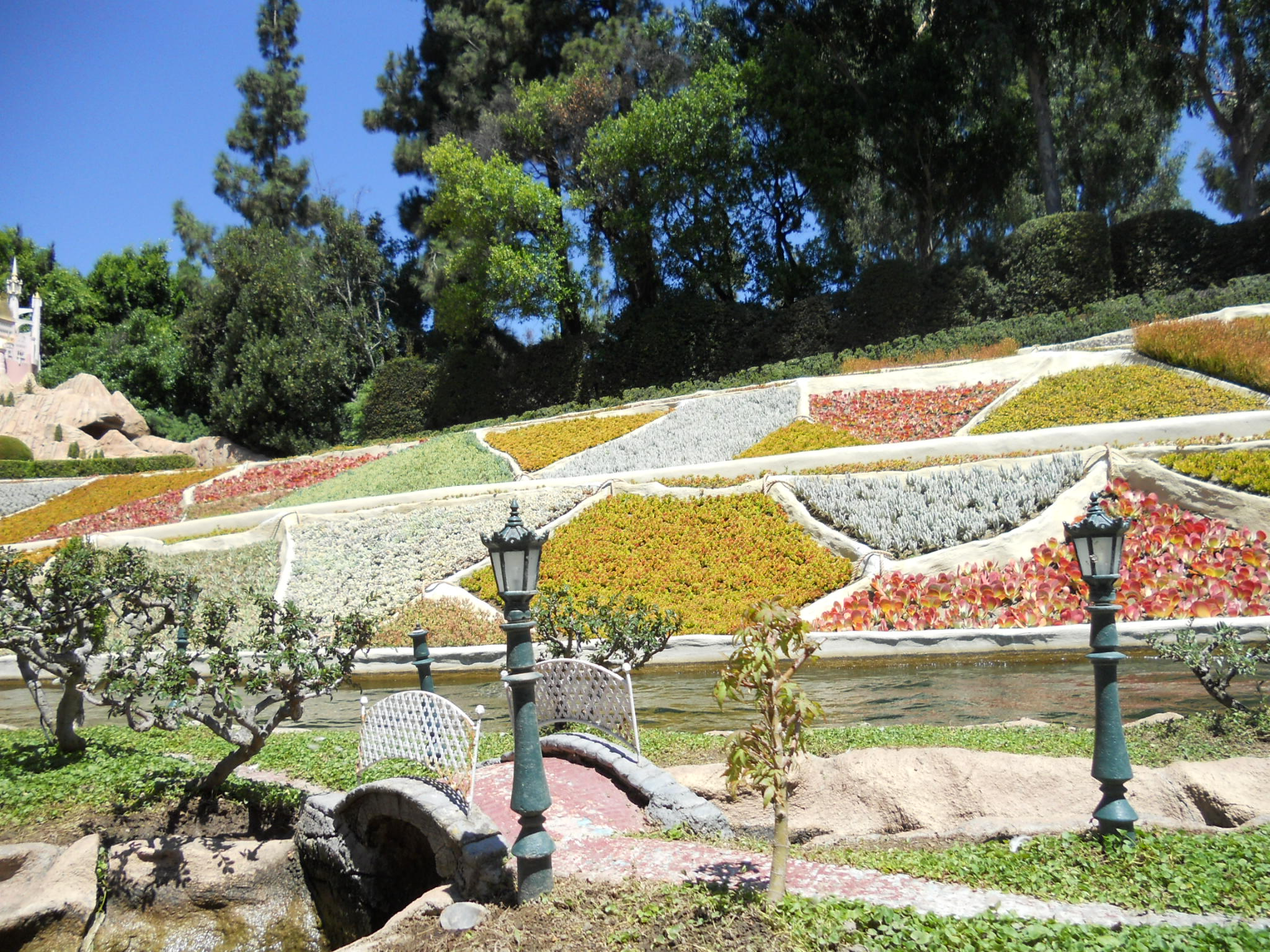
Giant's patchwork quilt from Lullaby Land

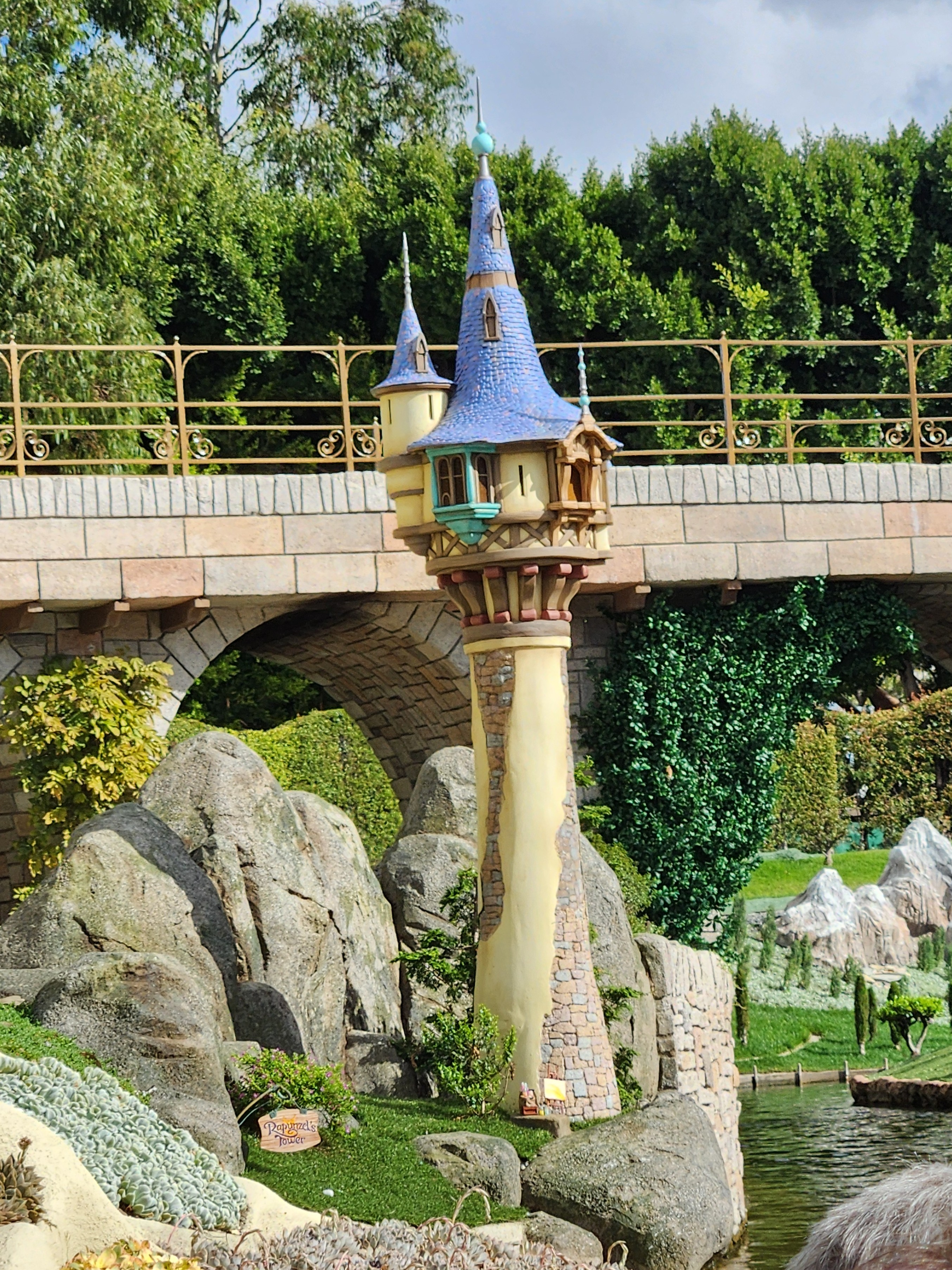
Rapunzel's tower from Tangled

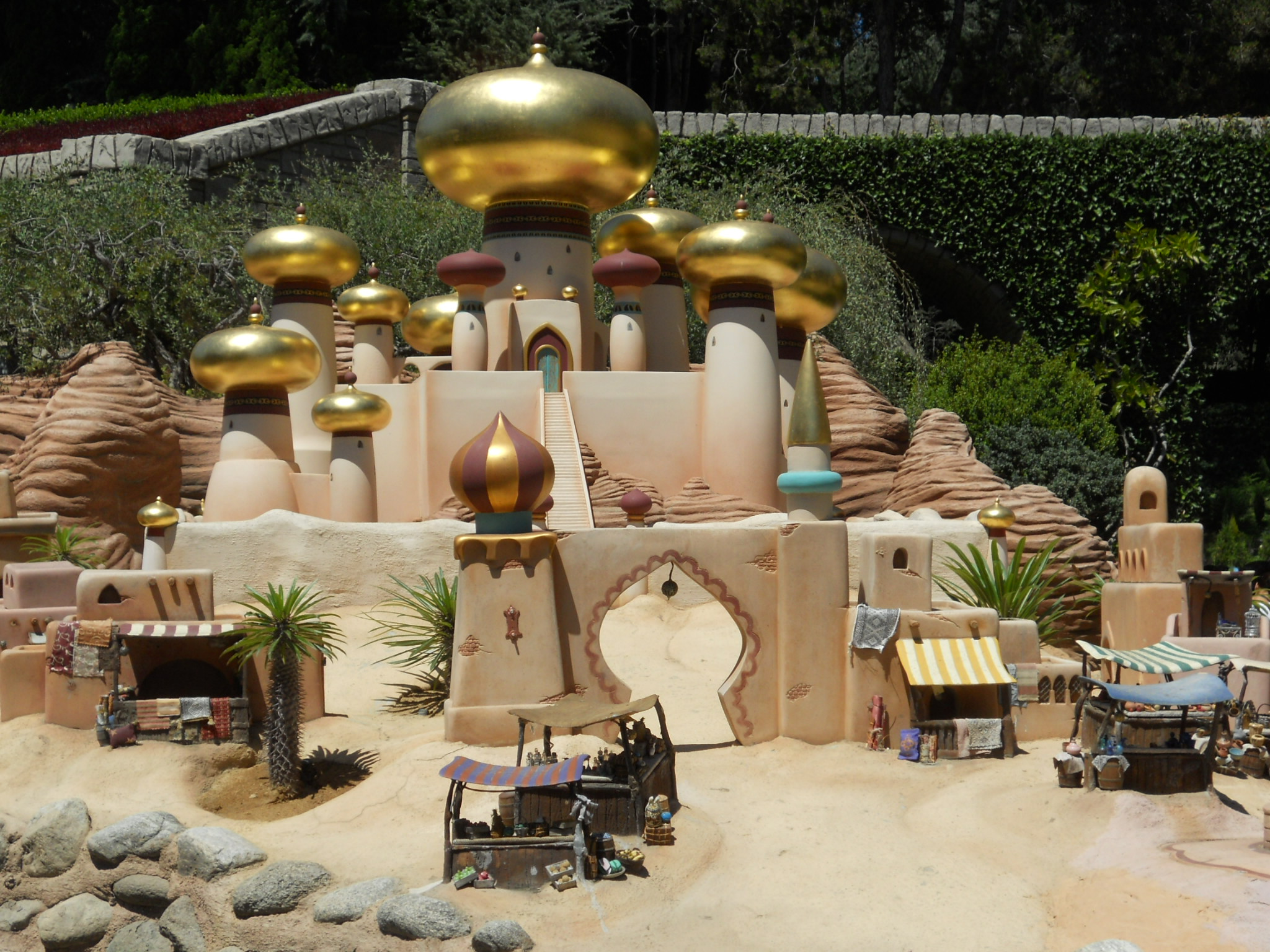
Sultan's palace from Aladdin

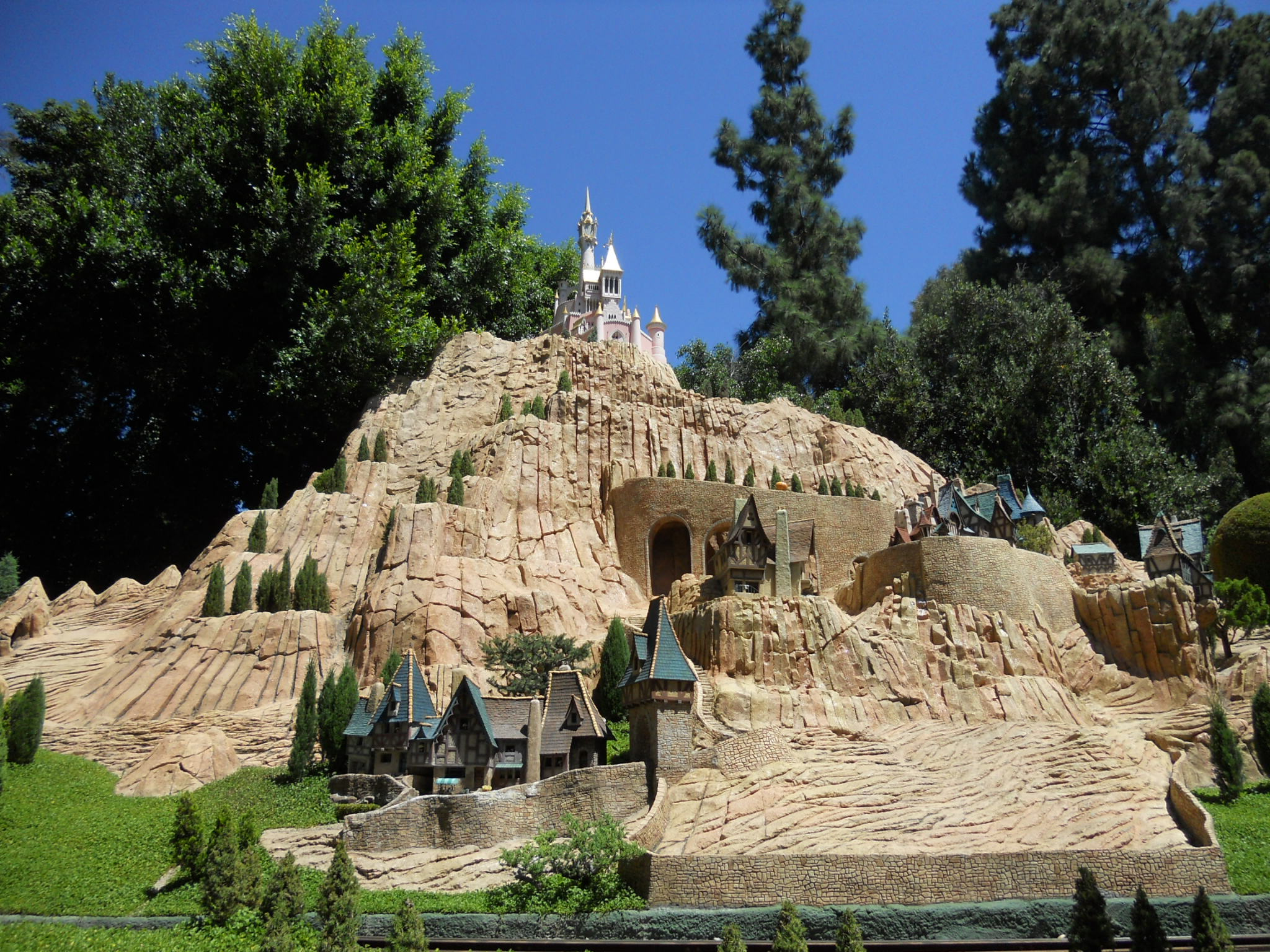
French village featuring a castle from Cinderella

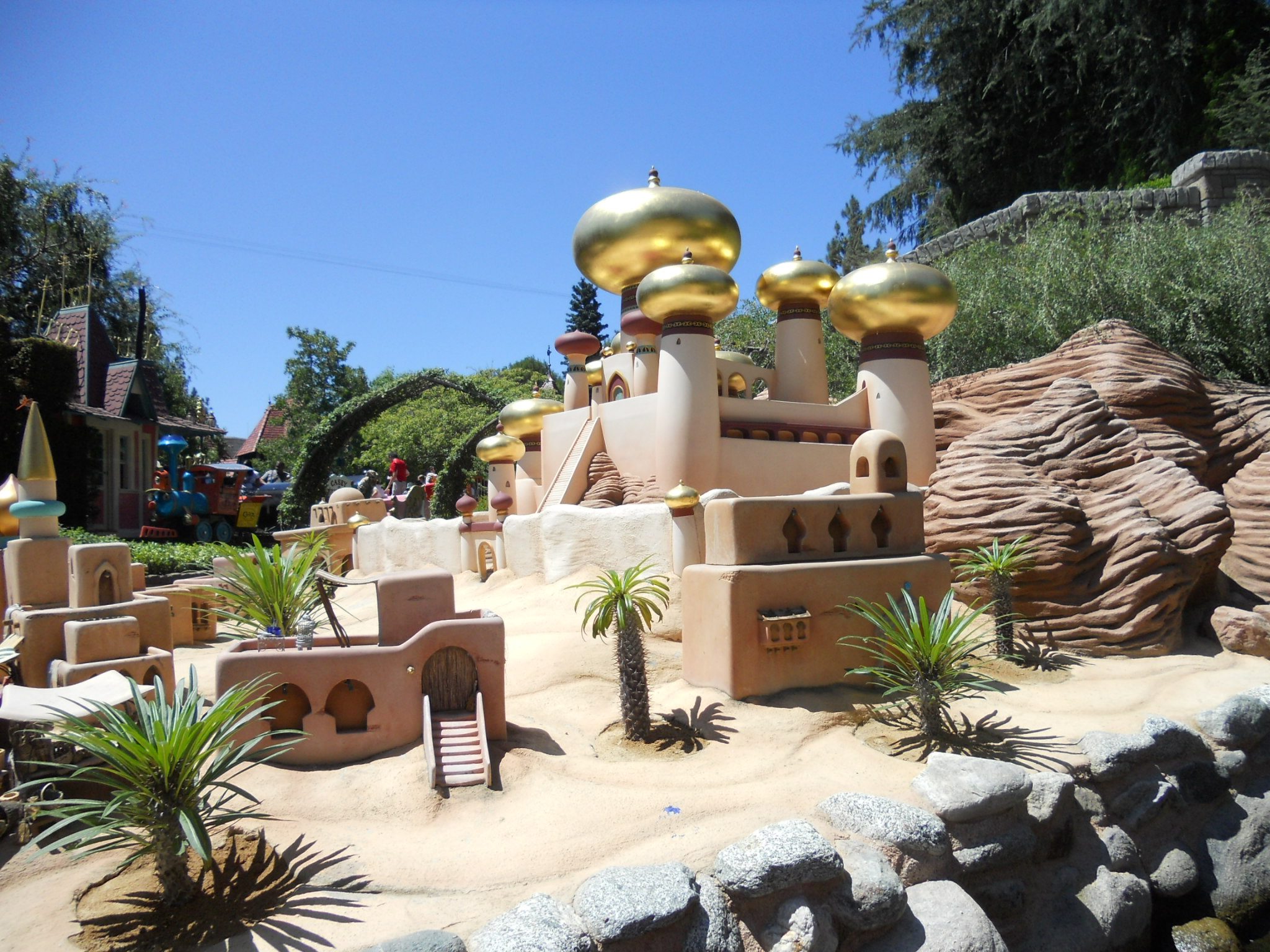
Agrabah

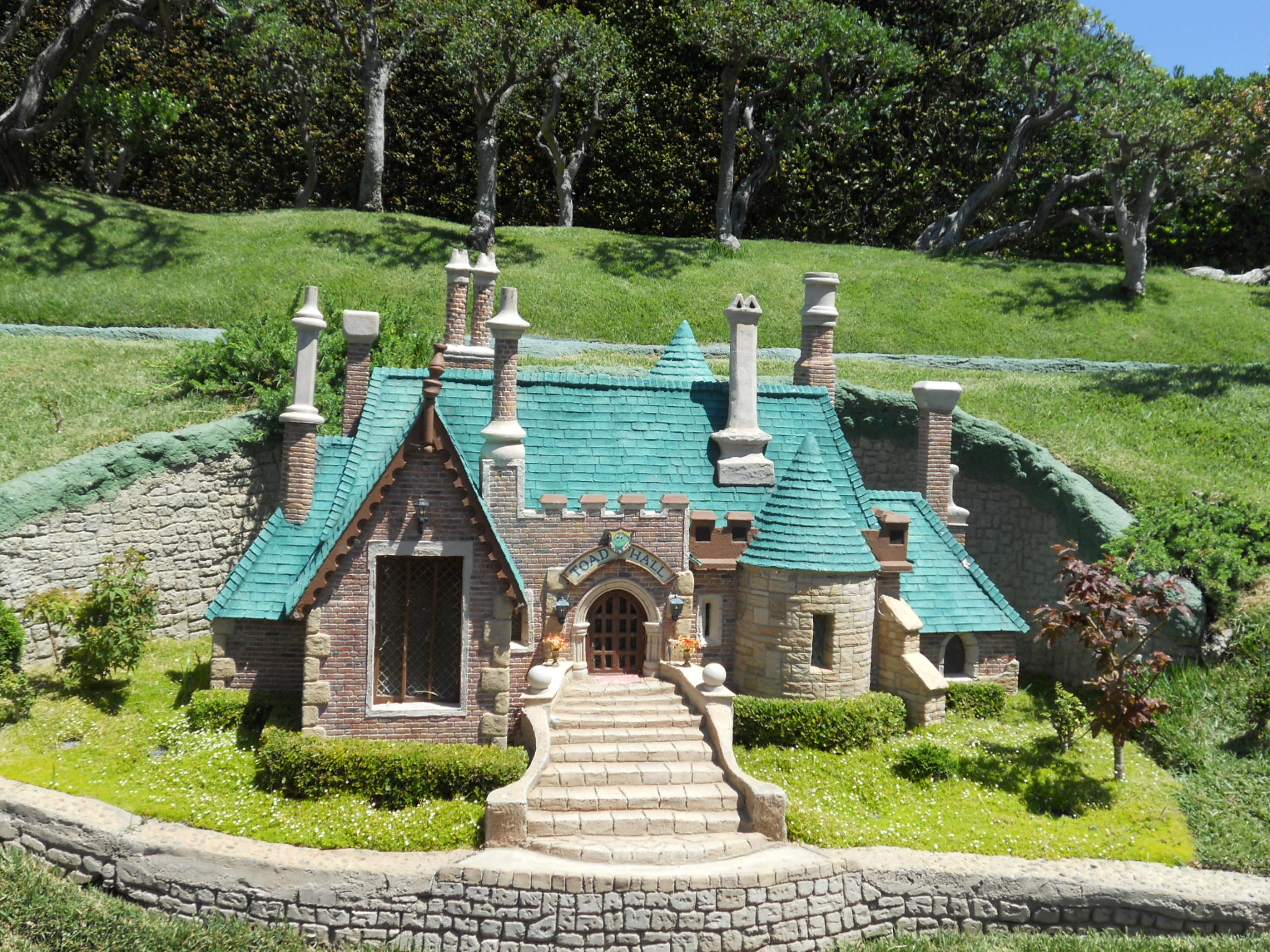
Toad Hall

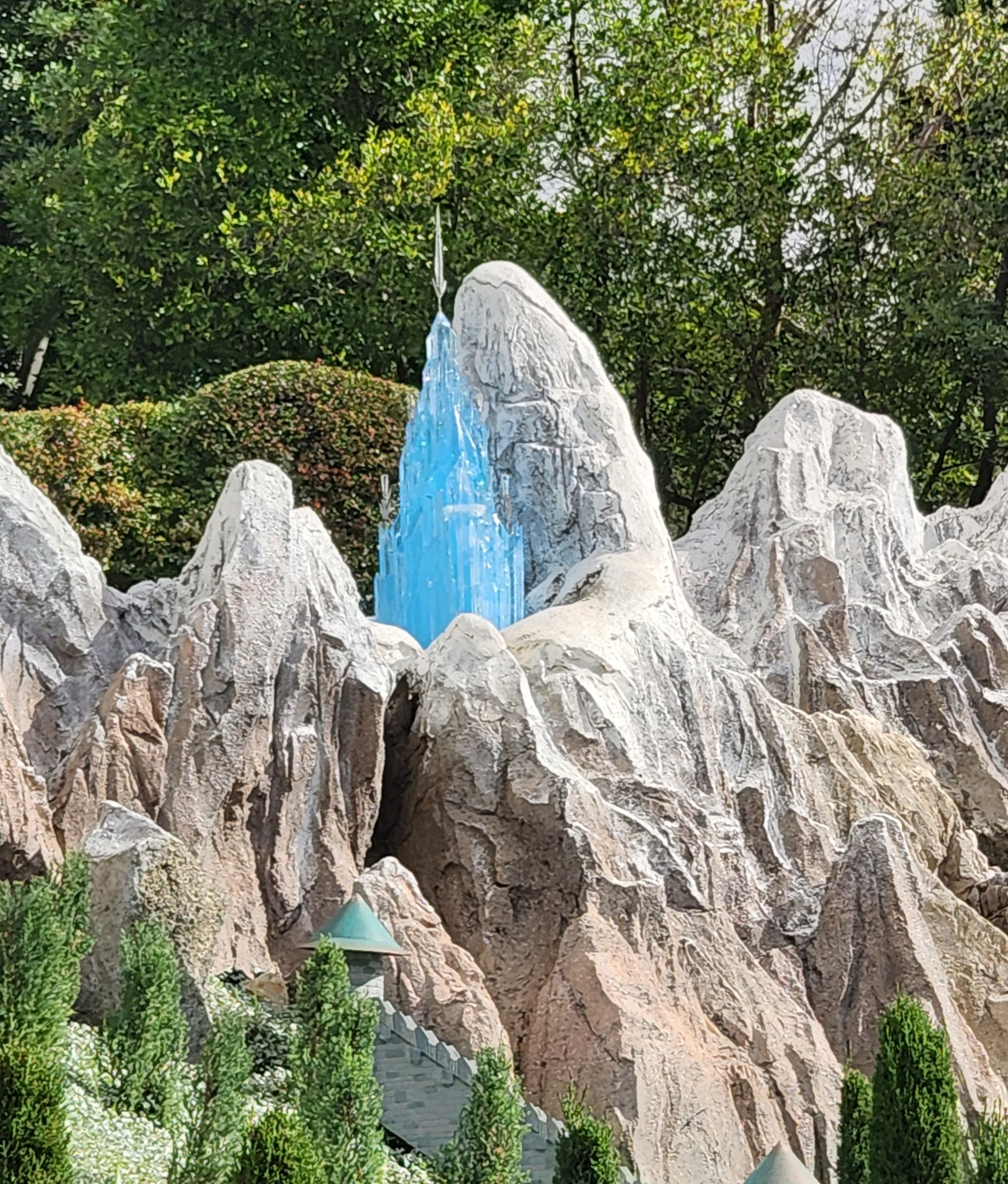
Elsa's ice palace from Frozen

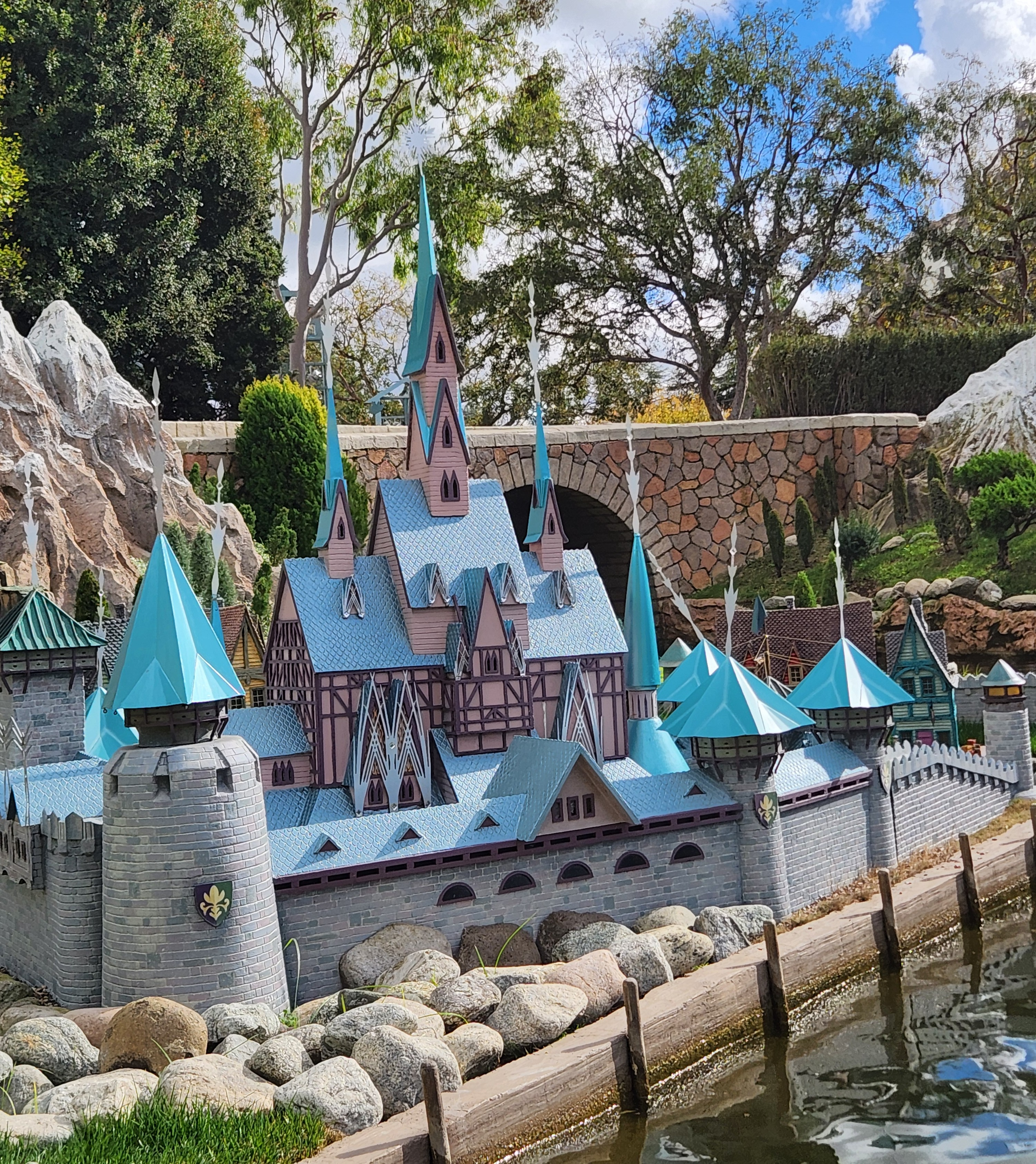
Anna and Elsa's castle from Frozen

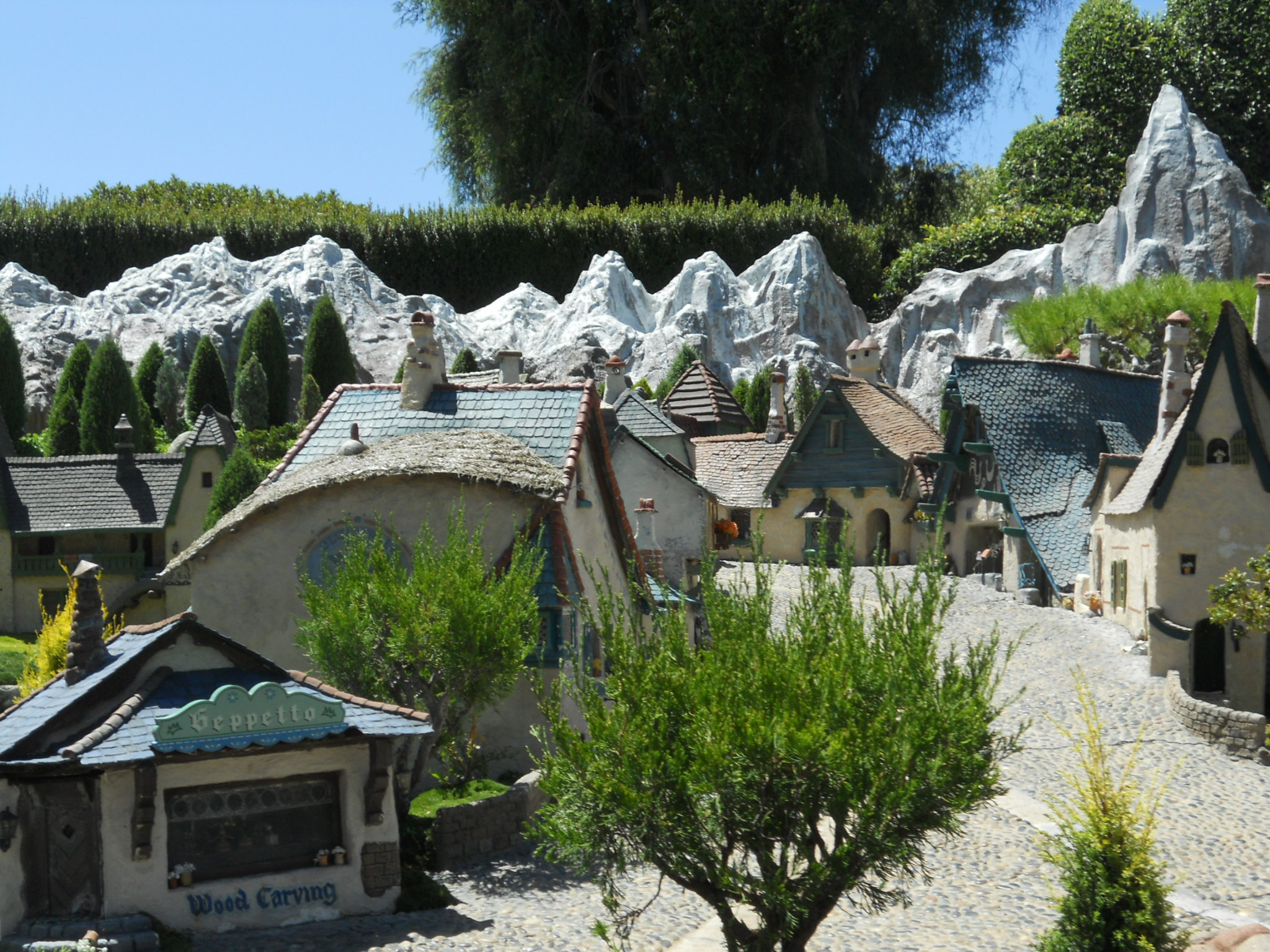
Pinocchio's Alpine village

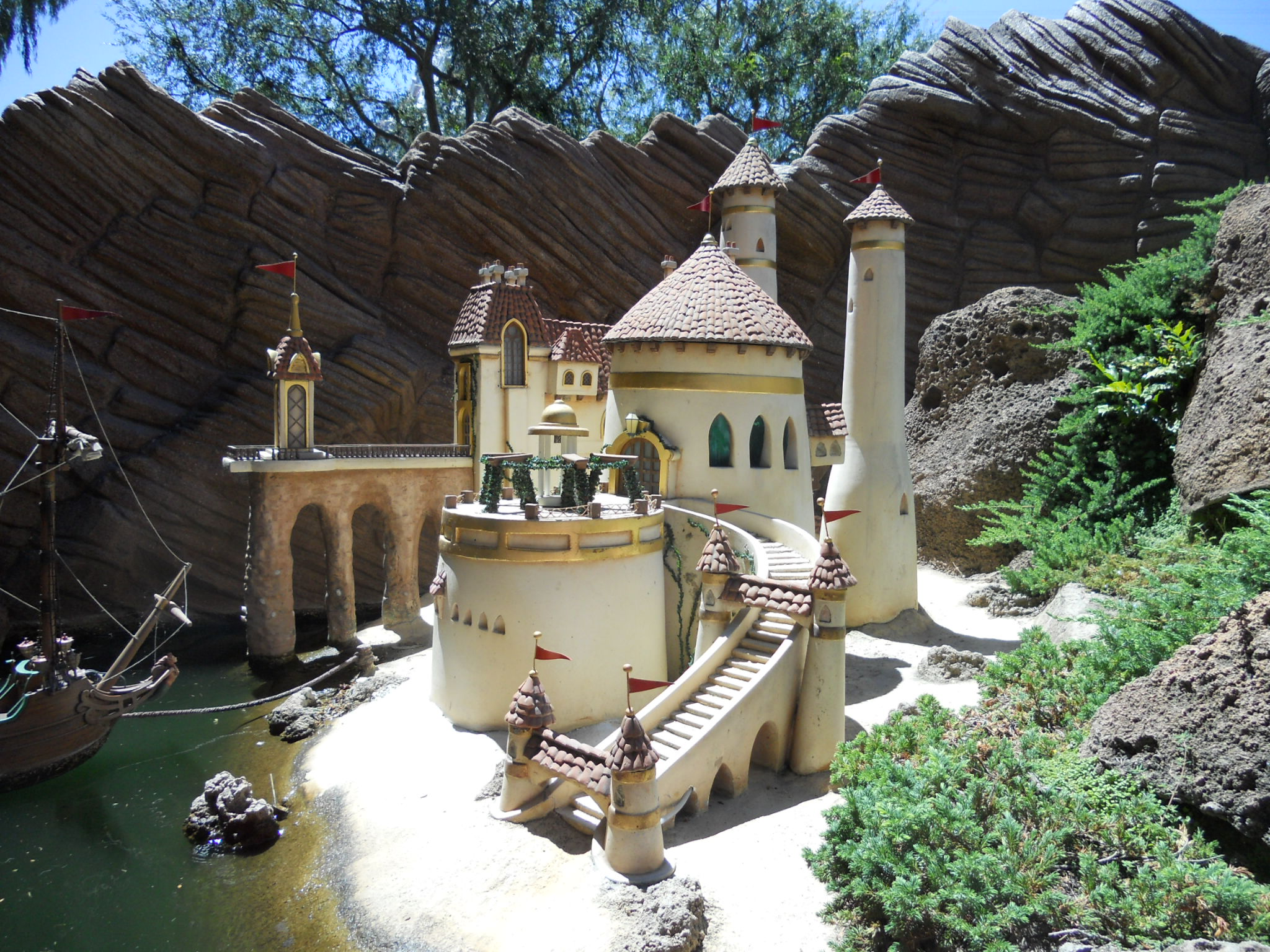
Prince Eric's castle from The Little Mermaid

== Disneyland Park Paris version ==
Unlike the original in California, a guide does not accompany the riders. The boats here are guided by an underwater wire rather than being propelled by an on-board motor. Passengers enter their boats via a slowly revolving platform. The whole transport system was developed by Intamin (as a Tow boat ride). The Cave of Wonders from Aladdin midway through the voyage replaces the Disneyland version's Monstro cave. The boats also float past these settings, accompanied by music from the respective film and minimal dialogue:

- The dwarfs' diamond mine and cottage from Snow White and the Seven Dwarfs
- Hundred Acre Wood and Winnie the Pooh's House from Winnie the Pooh (Replacing the Witch's gingerbread house from Babes in the Woods.)
- Rapunzel's high tower with a braid coming out of it, from Tangled
- The Old Mill from the animated short of the same name
- Prince Eric's seaside castle from The Little Mermaid
- The Greek temple and Mount Olympus from "The Pastoral Symphony" from Fantasia
- The North Mountain, Elsa's Ice Palace and Wandering Oaken's Trading Post and Sauna from Frozen (Replacing Peter and the Wolf from Make Mine Music.)
- The "Night on Bald Mountain" scene from Fantasia
- The Cave of Wonders from Aladdin
- The Sword in the Stone from the film of the same name
- Belle's village and the Beast's castle from Beauty and the Beast
- Carl's House and Paradise Falls from Up (Replacing the Emerald City and the Witch's Castle from Return to Oz.)

Names of the Canal Boats:

1. Alice
2. Ariel
3. Aurora
4. Belle
5. Cinderella
6. Fauna
7. Maid Marion
8. Flora
9. Jasmine
10. Merryweather
11. Pocahontas
12. Snow White
13. Tinkerbell
14. Wendy
15. Mary Poppins

Le Pays des Contes de Fées Queue Music

1. Snow White Overture
2. Winnie the Pooh from The Many Adventures of Winnie the Pooh
3. I See the Light from Tangled
4. Who's Afraid of the Big Bad Wolf? from Three Little Pigs
5. Part of Your World from The Little Mermaid
6. The Sorcerer's Apprentice from Fantasia
7. Let it Go from Frozen
8. A Whole New World from Aladdin
9. The Sword in the Stone Overture
10. Be Our Guest from Beauty and the Beast
11. Casey Jr. from Dumbo
12. When You Wish Upon a Star from Pinocchio

== See also ==
- List of Disneyland attractions
- List of Disneyland Park (Paris) attractions
