= Harper's Mill =

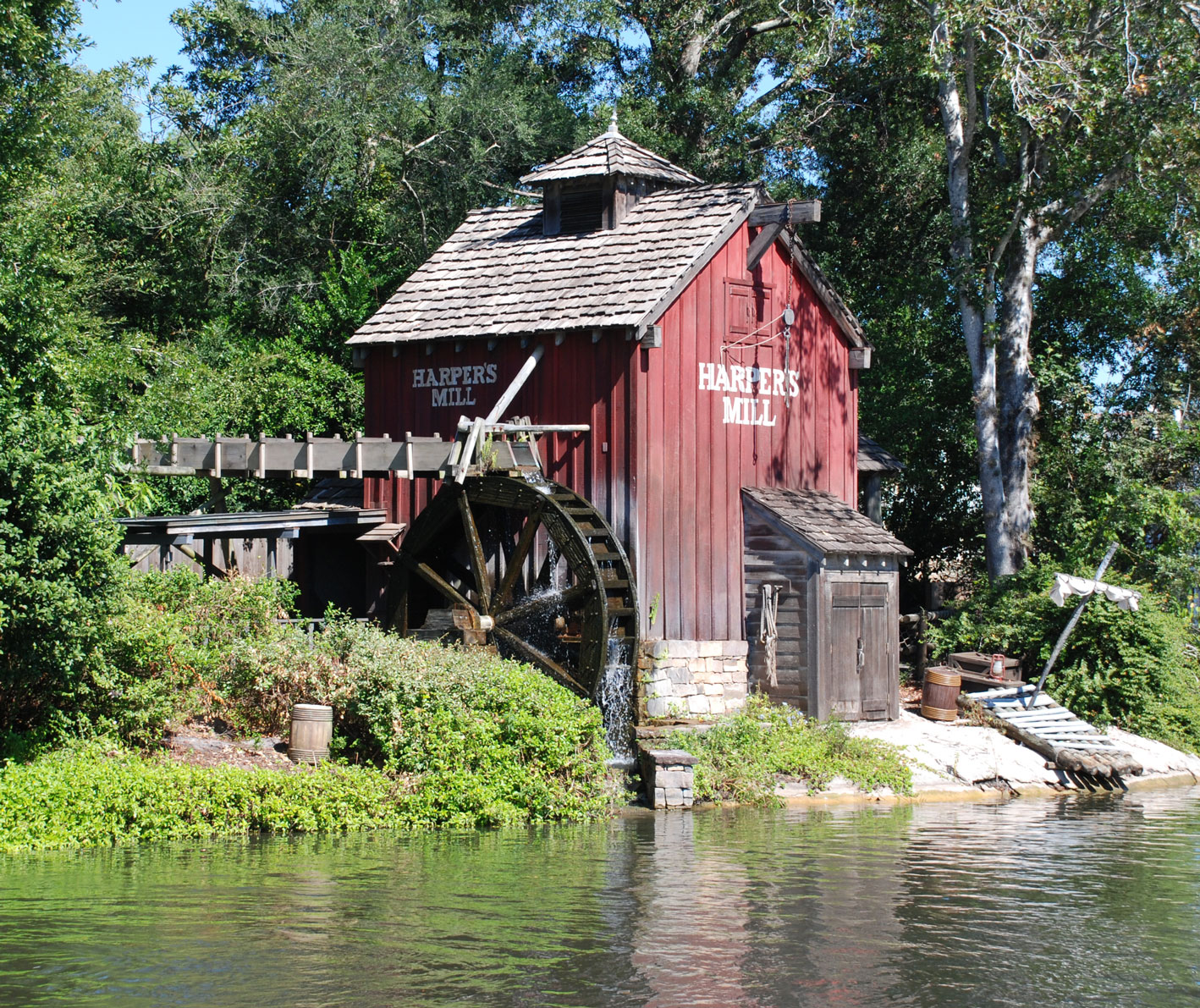
Harper's Mill on Magic Kingdom's Tom Sawyer Island

Harper's Mill was a rustic, water-powered mill located on Tom Sawyer Island in Walt Disney World's Magic Kingdom. It served as a tribute to classic American literature and Disney animation, blending elements from Mark Twain's The Adventures of Tom Sawyer with Disney's 1937 animated short The Old Mill.

The mill was named after Joe Harper, a character from Twain's novel who is one of Tom Sawyer's close friends. This naming choice reinforces the literary theming of Tom Sawyer Island, which opened to guests on May 20, 1973. Inside the mill, guests could observe a scene reminiscent of The Old Mill, featuring creaking gears and a nesting bluebird, accompanied by the tune "Down by the Old Mill Stream"

As of June 2025, Disney has announced that Tom Sawyer Island, including Harper's Mill, will close on July 7, 2025, to make way for a new Cars-themed area called Piston Peak National Park. This development is part of a larger expansion within Magic Kingdom's Frontierland.

== Lafitte's Tavern ==
In Disneyland, the structure originally known as Harper's Mill was reimagined in 2007 as Lafitte's Tavern during the transformation of Tom Sawyer Island into Pirate's Lair, incorporating themes from the Pirates of the Caribbean film series.
