= Roye =

Roye may refer to:

== Places ==
=== France ===
- Roye, Haute-Saône, in the Haute-Saône department
- Roye, Somme, in the Somme department
  - Canton of Roye, a canton in the department of the Somme
- Roye-sur-Matz, in the Oise department

== People ==
=== As a surname ===
- Al Roye (born 1940), Jamaican boxer, see Jack Bodell
- Anthony Roye (1922–1995), Welsh TV actor, featured in Fall of Eagles, Brain Versus Brawn and The Avengers
- Barthélemy de Roye (1170-1237), Grand Chamberman of France and belligerent in the Battle of Bouvines
- Burgess Roye, painter, brother of Paladine Roye
- Bronwyn Roye (born 1970), Australian rower
- Charles Roye, American boxer, see Reggie Gross
- Charles de Roye, Count of Roucy (1510-1551), French nobleman, father of Eléanor de Roucy de Roye
- Edward James Roye (1815–1872), fifth President of Liberia
- Gilles de Roye (died 1478), Flemish chronicler and Cistercian monk
- Guy of Roye (died 1409), French prelate
- Horace Roye (1906–2002), photographer
- Jimmy Roye (born 1988), French professional footballer
- Norman Roye (1935–1956), American serial killer
- Orpheus Roye (born 1973), American football player
- Paladine Roye (1946–2001), Native American painter
- Peter van Roye (born 1950), German rower
- Ruth Roye (1896–1960), American vaudeville performer
- Tim Roye, radio play-by-play announcer for the NBA's Golden State Warriors

=== Other ===
- House of Roye, French noble family which held the county of Roucy
- Roye Albrighton, English musician, member of rock band Nektar
- Roye England, founder of Pendon Museum, England
