= Capperonnier =

Capperonnier is a French surname. Notable people with the surname include:

- Claude Capperonnier (1671–1744), French scholar
- Jean Capperonnier (1716–1775), French scholar, nephew of Claude
