= Tomás Claudio =

Filipino soldier who fought in World War I

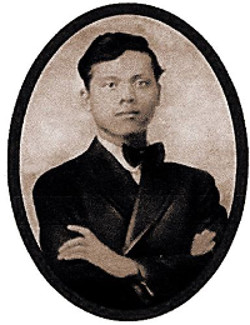
- Born: Tomás Claudio y Mateo; May 7, 1892; Morong, District of Morong, Captaincy General of the Philippines, Spanish East Indies
- Died: June 29, 1918 (aged 26); Château-Thierry, France
- Burial place: Manila North Cemetery
- Military career
- Allegiance: United States
- Branch: United States Army
- Service years: 1917 – 1918
- Rank: Private
- Conflicts: World War I

Tomás Claudio y Mateo (May 7, 1892 – June 29, 1918) was a Filipino soldier who enlisted in the U.S. Army during the First World War. He was considered the first Filipino to die overseas in the midst of an international conflict.

== Early life and military career ==
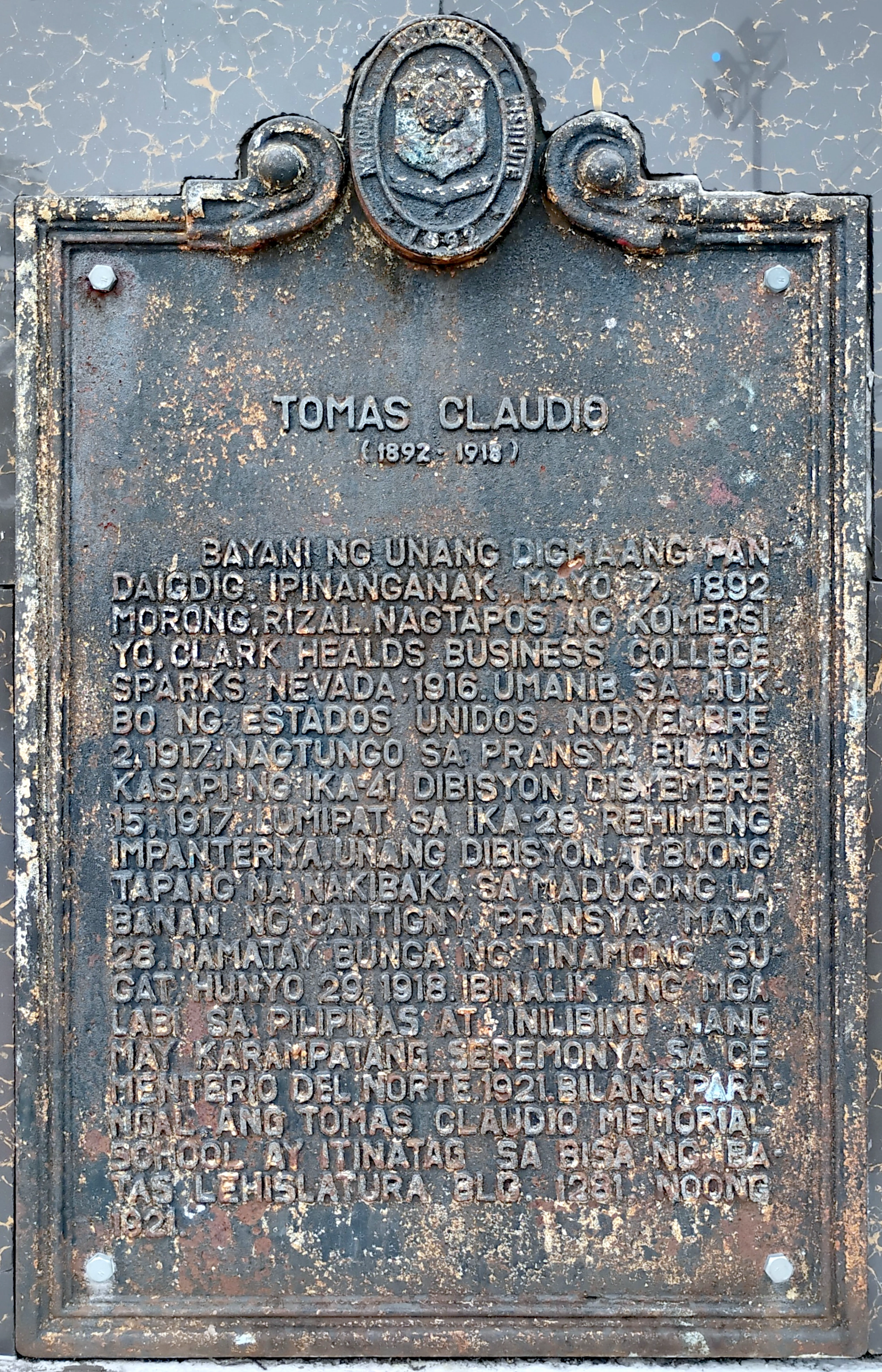
National historical marker installed at the Morong Plaza in 1992

He was born on May 7, 1892, to Gregorio Claudio, a violinist, and Pelagia Mateo, a seamstress. He already showed bravery and an inclination for military service and adventure as a young boy. Although he was quite stubborn, his cheerful disposition endeared him to his friends and classmates at the school.

In a military exercise in his school, Claudio showed signs of a great military officer as he was given the rank of battalion commander because he was the most outstanding captain of Company A. However, his father died in 1907. He eventually finished his elementary education but failed to finished high school. He later became a guard at the Bureau of Prisons but was dismissed from the job in 1911 because of dereliction of duty, that is, sleeping on the job. He soon left the country and went to Hawaii to work in a sugar plantation. He later went to Alaska to work in the salmon canneries there. After all those, he went to Reno, Nevada, where he finished commerce at Clark Healds Business College in 1916. Upon graduating, he accepted a clerkship at the City Post Office.

== World War I ==
It was on April 6, 1917, when the United States entered the war against the Central Powers, who were battling the Allies in trench warfare. In this case, the Philippine Assembly formed the Philippine National Guard as a contribution to the American Expeditionary Force contingent to provide support to the war-weary Allied forces. Able Filipino males who came from the Philippines to work as contract workers in the Hawaiian sugar, pineapple plantations and other industries were required to register in the U.S. military drafts of June 5, 1917, June 5, 1918, and September 12, 1918. Some volunteered, others were drafted. Most of them served in Schofield Barracks, Ft. Shafter and Hawaiian National Guard from the ranks of private to sergeant

Claudio decided to apply in the U.S. Army. After being denied twice, he was finally enlisted on November 2, 1917. He became a member of the 41st Infantry Division and left for Europe on December 15. His last destination was France, where he served, initially, in the trenches of the Toul Sector and, later, with the reserve division near Paris. Subsequently, he was assigned to the Montdidier front.

== Death ==
Under the leadership of General John Pershing, the Americans held their ground from repeated German attacks. Private Claudio took part in these crucial battles in the Marne Offensive. Artillery shells pounded "No Man's Land", barbed wires left mutilated hands and gunpowder and blood mixed together. In the ensuing battle, Private Claudio was killed by enemy fire on June 29, 1918, in Château-Thierry, France. He was the only Filipino to die in World War I.

== Legacy ==
- Camp Tomas Claudio in Tambo, Parañaque City, is currently a Philippine Navy station and housing facility. Camp Claudio was the location of Curtiss Flying School in 1918, which saw the first Filipino aviators take flight under the leadership of Joe Stevenot.
- The Tomas Claudio Memorial Elementary School, founded in 1921, and the Tomas Claudio Colleges, founded in 1950, both in Morong, Rizal, Philippines, were named in his honor.
- Tomas Claudio Street, first constructed in the late 1920s under the US Insular Government of the Philippines, is named after him. Similar streets in some cities or municipalities also bear such name.
- Tomas Claudio Bridge in Pandacan, Manila.
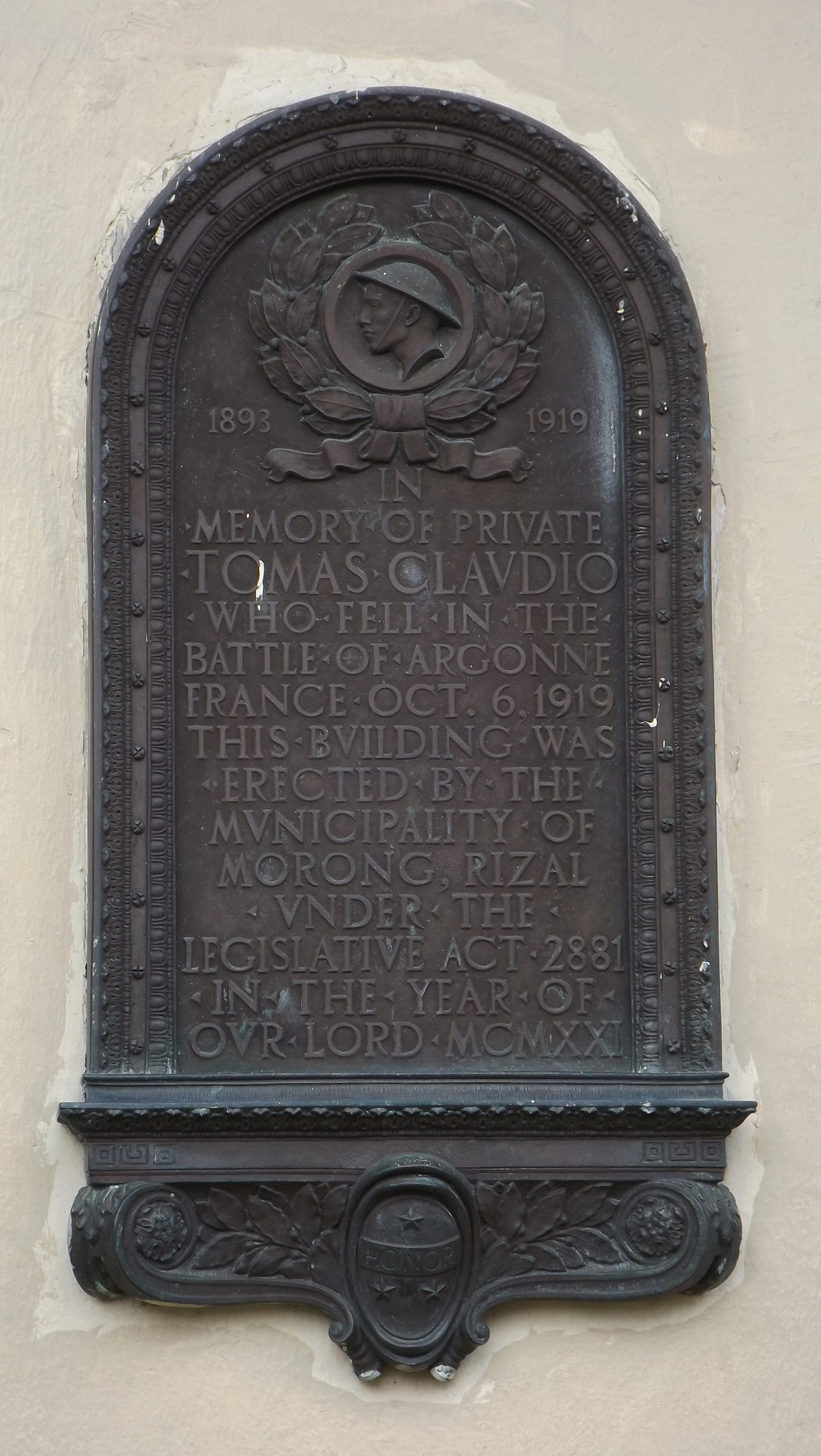
1921 historical marker dedicating the Gabaldon building inside the Tomas Claudio Memorial Elementary School in Claudio's honor

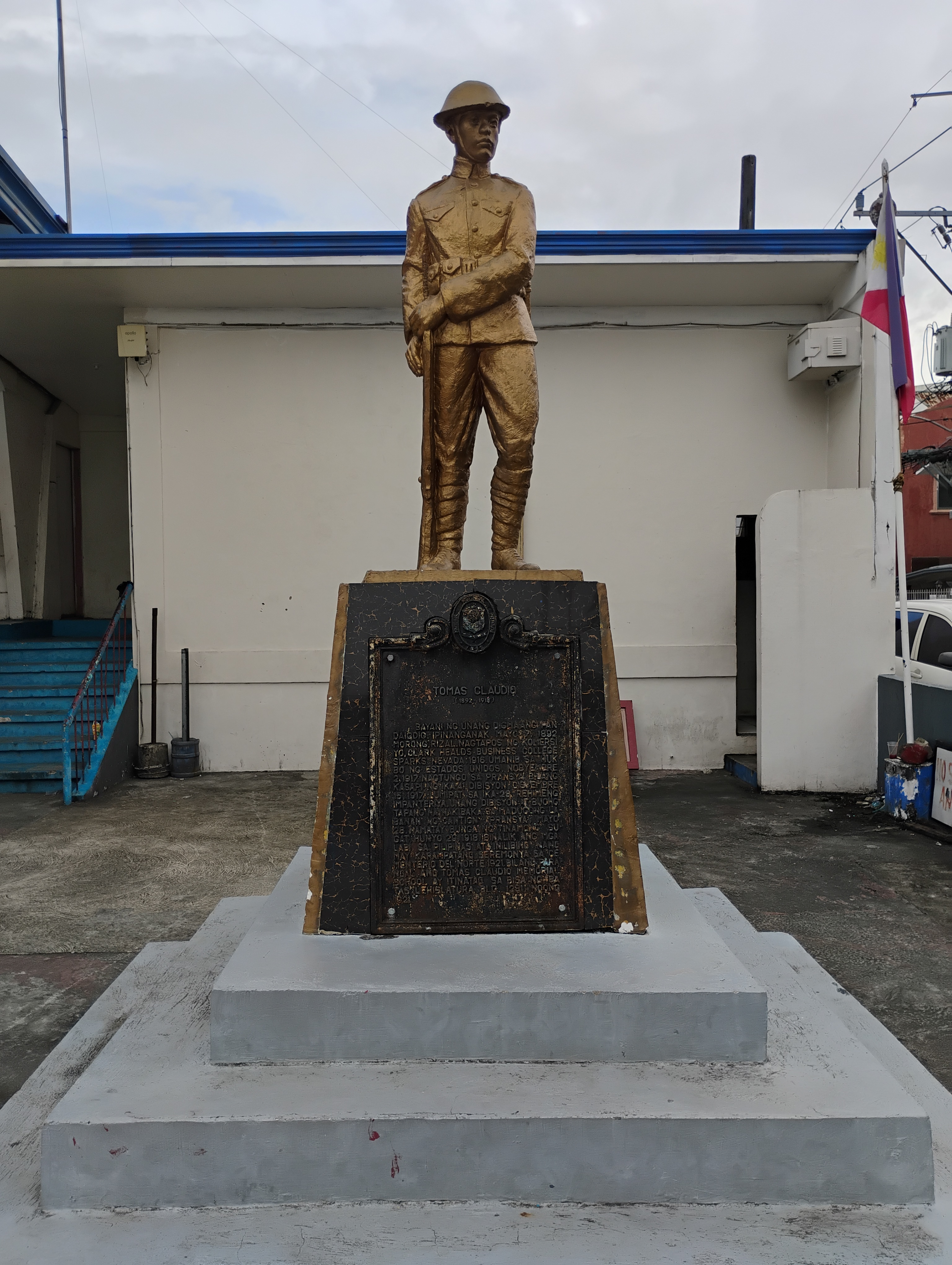
Statue of Claudio and 1992 historical marker installed at the Morong Town Plaza, Morong, Rizal
