= Pendon Museum =

Museum in Oxfordshire, England

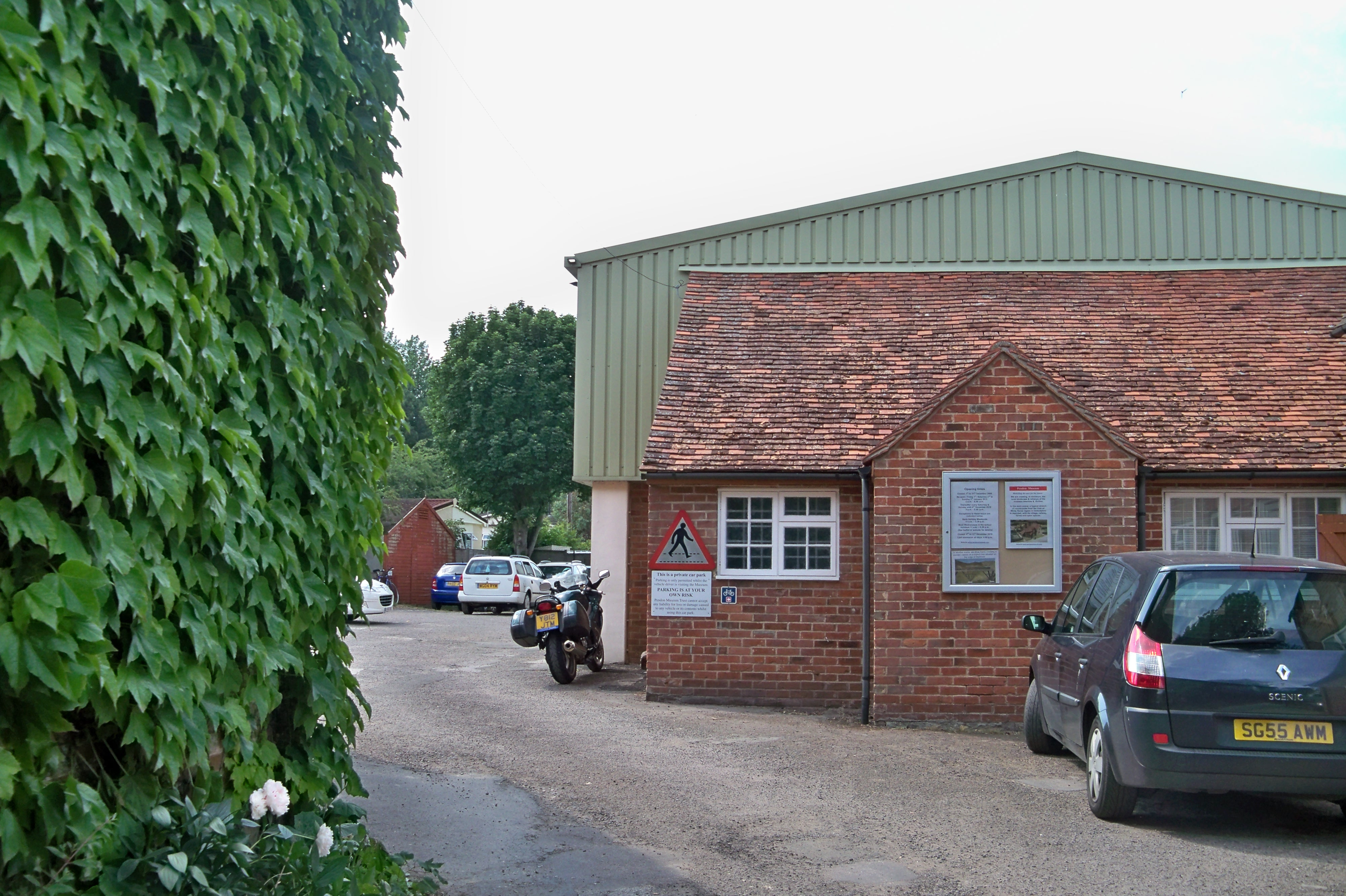

- Location within Oxfordshire
- Established: 1954; 72 years ago
- Location: Long Wittenham, Oxfordshire, England
- Coordinates: 51.63770°N 1.21822°W
- Type: History museum
- Founder: Roye England
- Website: pendonmuseum.com

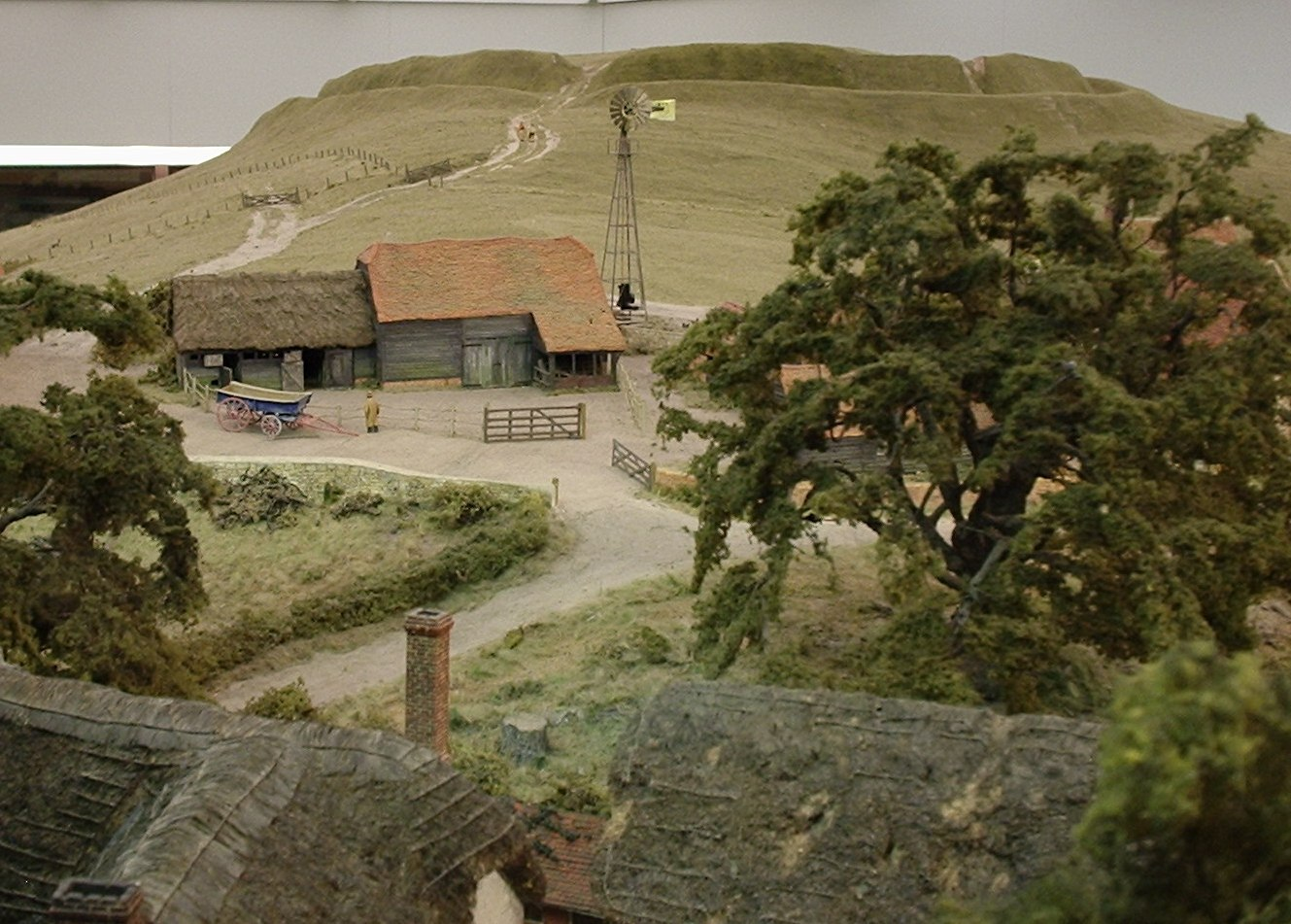
Pendon's White Horse Hill

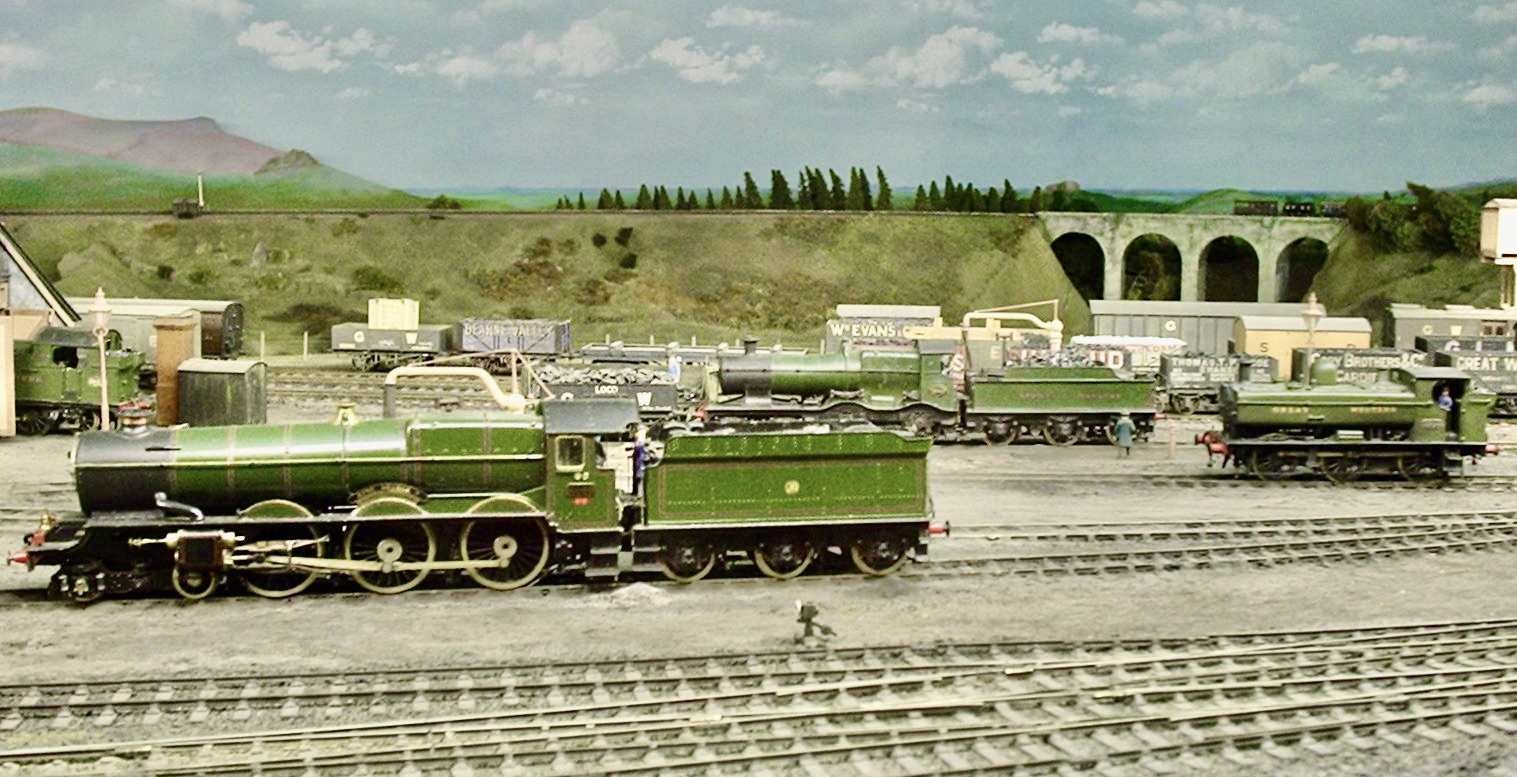
Engine shed on the Dartmoor scene

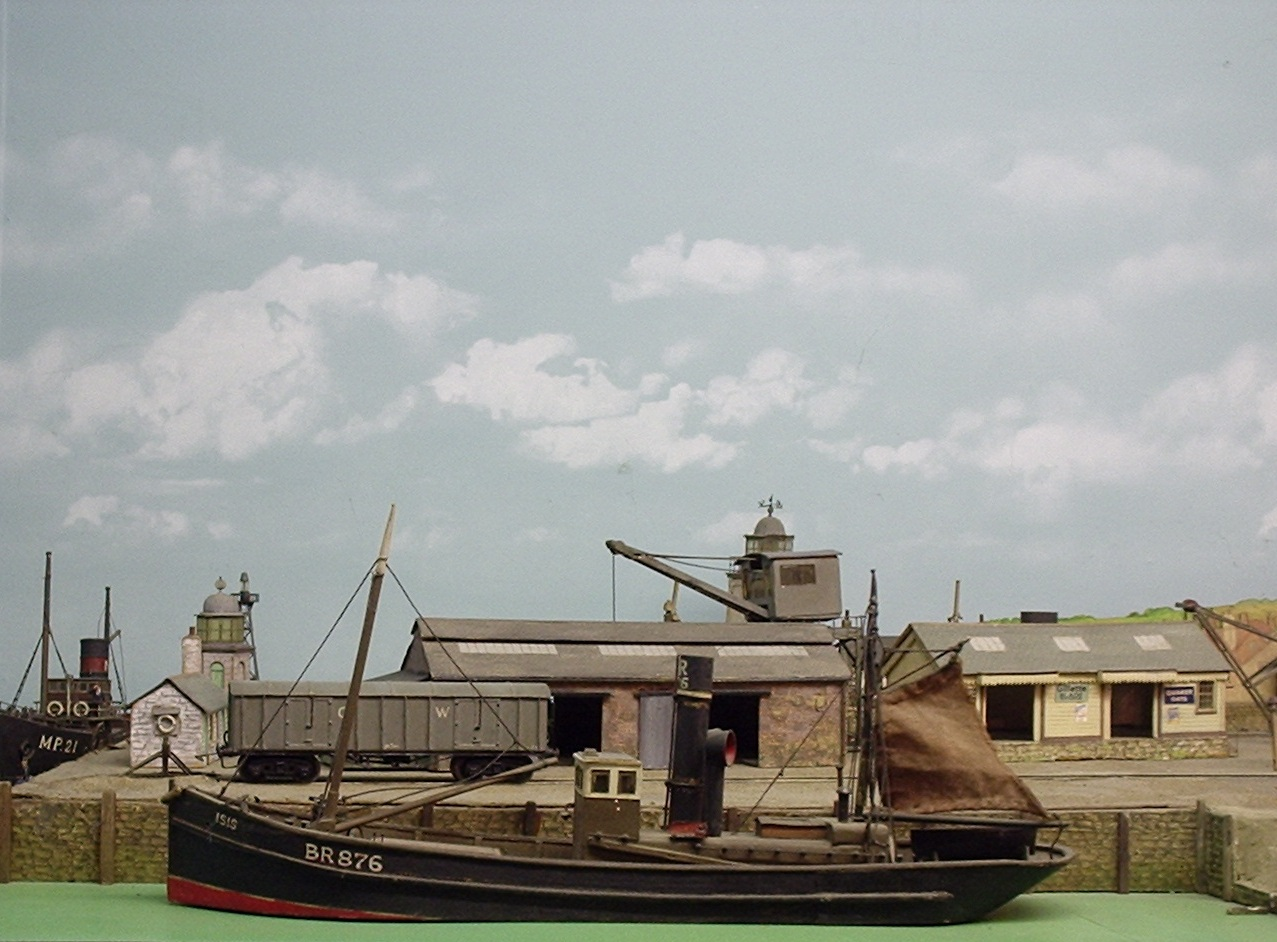
John Ahern's Madderport

Pendon Museum is a museum in Long Wittenham, Oxfordshire, England, that displays scale models, in particular a large scene representing parts of the Vale of White Horse in the 1920s and 1930s. The scene, under construction since the 1950s and with parts dating back earlier, was inspired by detailed research into the architecture and landscape of the vale, with some models of cottages taking hundreds of hours to complete. The late Roye England, an anglophile Australian who lived in England, founded it, and ran it jointly with the late English model maker Guy Williams, who made fifty-seven of the museum's ninety locomotives.

They can be seen working together in the 1958 British Pathé short Hair Thatching.

== History ==
The museum was founded by the artist and craftsman Roye England, who was interested in model railways. He observed the destruction and modification of many historic buildings in the area and began to make model representations of them.

Both the main Vale scene and others display working scale models of typical scenes of the Great Western Railway (GWR) of the 1920s. The trains are also representative in detail of those travelling that line in those years.

== Displays ==
=== Vale of White Horse ===
The main display and ongoing project at Pendon is a 1:76 scale representation of the Vale of White Horse as it was in the inter-war period. The scene is centred on the 'typical' village of Pendon Parva, which is served by a railway station on the main London to Bristol GWR main line that runs through the Vale, and another on the M&SWJR that became one of the constituent companies of the GWR in 1923. The topography and the village layout is fictional, but every building and significant feature is an exact model of a real building from the Vale of White Horse as it was in the 1920s/30s.

Some locos on the layout:

- GWR 2900 Class No. 2943 Hampton Court Built in 1912.
- GWR 4000 Class No. 4050 Princess Alice Built in 1914.
- GWR 2251 Class No. 2253 Built in 1930.
- LSWR N15 Class No. 789 Sir Guy Built in 1925.
- GWR 3700 Class No. 3705 Mauritius
- LSWR S15 class No. 515 Built in 1921.

=== Dartmoor branch ===
On the ground floor of the museum, a model representing a Great Western Railway branch line on Dartmoor (originally created in 1955 to showcase the trains being built for the Vale scene when it was in construction) is operated for visitors. The main focus of the Dartmoor scene is a model of Brunel's timber viaduct at Walkham in Devon built by R. Guy Williams, who also built many of the model locomotives at the museum.

Locos on the layout include:

- GWR 2900 Class No. 2921 Saint Dunstan Built in 1907.
- GWR 2800 Class No. 2844 Built in 1912.
- LSWR M7 Class No. 30 Built in 1904

=== Madder Valley ===
Madder Valley is a pioneering model railway built by John Ahern between 1941 and 1951. It is an historic relic of the early days of scenic railway modelling and pioneered the idea of placing a model railway in the context of the towns and villages that it was built to serve, together with the countryside through which it ran. Madder Valley was never intended as a replica of an actual scene and features buildings that were derived from real ones, without necessarily being exact copies of their originals. The rolling stock included models of narrow gauge locomotives from the Isle of Man, Wales and Devon built to run on 16.5mm gauge track alongside models of standard gauge stock, some of them based on real light railway vehicles as well as some freelance models.

=== Sea Wall Scene ===
The most compact model in the collection represents a shortened model of the Brunel designed line in Teignmouth, South Devon, and trains are shared with those running on the main line of the Dartmoor scene.

The museum also includes displays of individual models, modelling methods and railway artefacts.

== Models ==
The model trains are hand built, to represent individual locomotives, carriages, and wagons as exactly possible, based on surviving records and photographs. Operation consists of a sequence of trains, showing what one could have seen passing by on a summer day and night, in the mid-1920s. This sequence is based on timetables of the period. They are all modelled in 4 mm to 1 foot scale (1:76), and run on track of 18mm gauge, a combination known as EM gauge.
