= Tomas Claudio Memorial Elementary School =

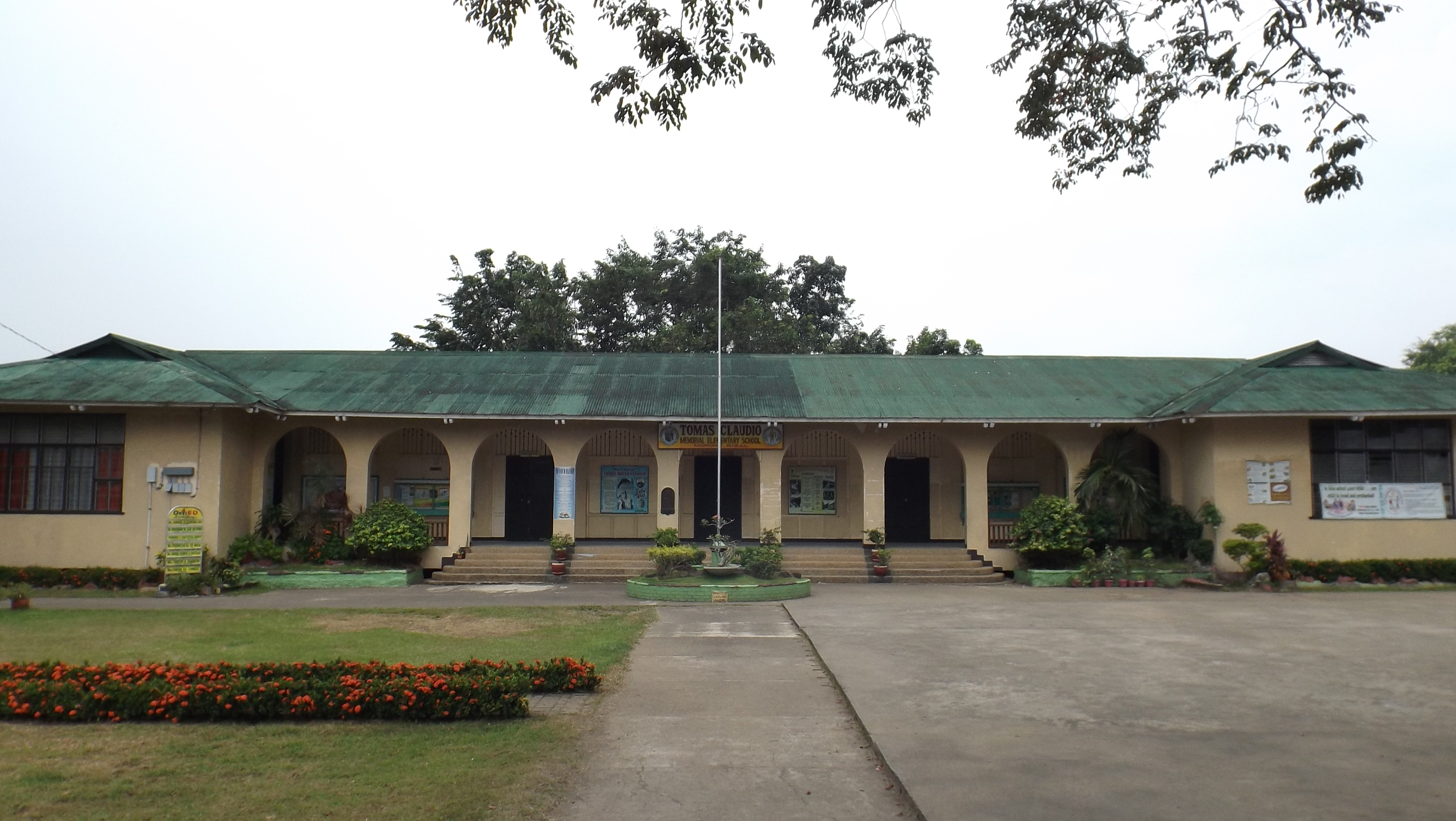
- Facade of the Main School Building

Location
- Tomas Claudio St. Morong, Rizal; Philippines
- Coordinates: 14.517889°N 121.238534°E

Tomas Claudio Memorial Elementary School, formerly called Tomas Claudio Memorial School, was constructed in 1921 in honor of Private Tomas Mateo Claudio, the first Filipino hero of Morong, Rizal, in the Philippines, who died during World War I in France. The school is considered the Alma Mater of most Moronguenos.

== History ==
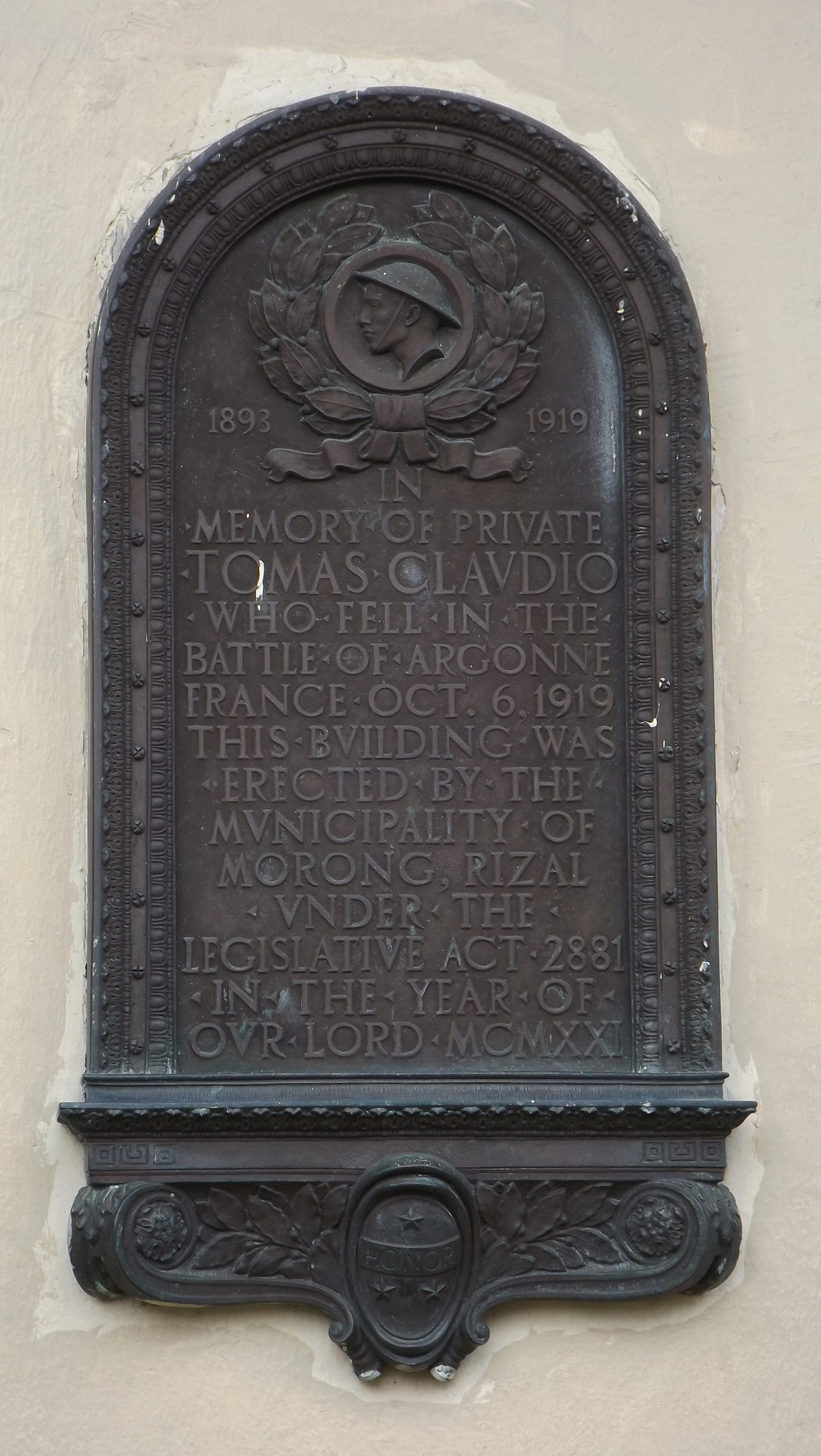
One of the Philippines' oldest Historical Markers, installed in 1921. This marker is made of bronze and marble.

Before Tomas Claudio Memorial Elementary School was constructed, an elementary school known as Morong Elementary School or Morong Central School was already operating in 1901, which was housed at the Commandancia.

Former Municipal President Felix San Juan urged a committee to send a resolution to the National Assembly to request for an appropriation of fifteen thousand pesos for a school building in honor of Private Tomas Mateo Claudio. On February 24, 1920, an act was passed and signed into law by then Governor General Francis Burton Harrison to appropriate the sum of fifteen thousand pesos as additional funds for the construction of an intermediate school in Morong, Rizal.

As provided in Section 2 of the said Act, a bust or relief medallion made of bronze and marble representing Tomas Mateo Claudio must be installed on the facade of the school building.

When the school building was completed, classes from Grades 5 to 7 were held in the new building while Grades 1 to 4 remained in the Commandancia. In 1927, a Home Economics building was constructed. A few years later, more rooms were added to the main building. Former First Lady Aurora Quezon admired the school's library and museum during her visit to the school in 1938.

At the time of the Japanese occupation in the Philippines, the school was converted into a garrison until July 10, 1942, which compelled the classes to be held at the Commandancia. The school was reconstructed in 1945 under the Rehabilitation Act, and resumed its use for the intermediate classes. Still, the Commandancia was used by the primary students.

In 1959, a two-room prefabricated rooms were added and used by Grade 1 and 2 students. Rodriguez-type buildings were erected in 1963, followed by the Marcos-type buildings behind the Gabaldon-type building.

When the Commandancia got damaged due to Typhoon Yoling in 1970, all primary classes were transferred to Tomas Claudio Memorial Elementary School, making it a complete elementary school since then.

== Architecture ==
During the American period (1898–1945), about 3,000 Gabaldon-type school buildings were constructed and American-style educational system was introduced.

Upon the signing of Act 2881, the townspeople of Morong, Rizal contributed sand and gravel and a Gabaldon-type school building was erected in 1921. The U-shaped one-storey building has a concrete foundation with the floor raised from the ground to promote air passage, an adaptation to the tropical climate in the country. The nine concrete arches at the facade of the building reflect an American-era image of the cultural heritage in Morong, Rizal. Board panels on the interior and some portions of exterior wall are arranged vertically and horizontally. Wooden air vents that promote air circulation are placed on the lower part of the wall touching the floor. Windows are either glass and capiz, which are retained on the upper part of the wall. Cut-out fretworks with abacus design are seen on the upper portions of the wall. These not only give a decorative look, but also allow ventilation. The roofing is made of galvanized iron sheets.

At present, tiles are laid on a portion of the floor of the main building. The school library and mini museum was created by removing some classroom partitions to produce a larger room. To meet the need for additional classrooms for the growing student population, additional school buildings are being erected in the nearby areas.

== Gallery ==
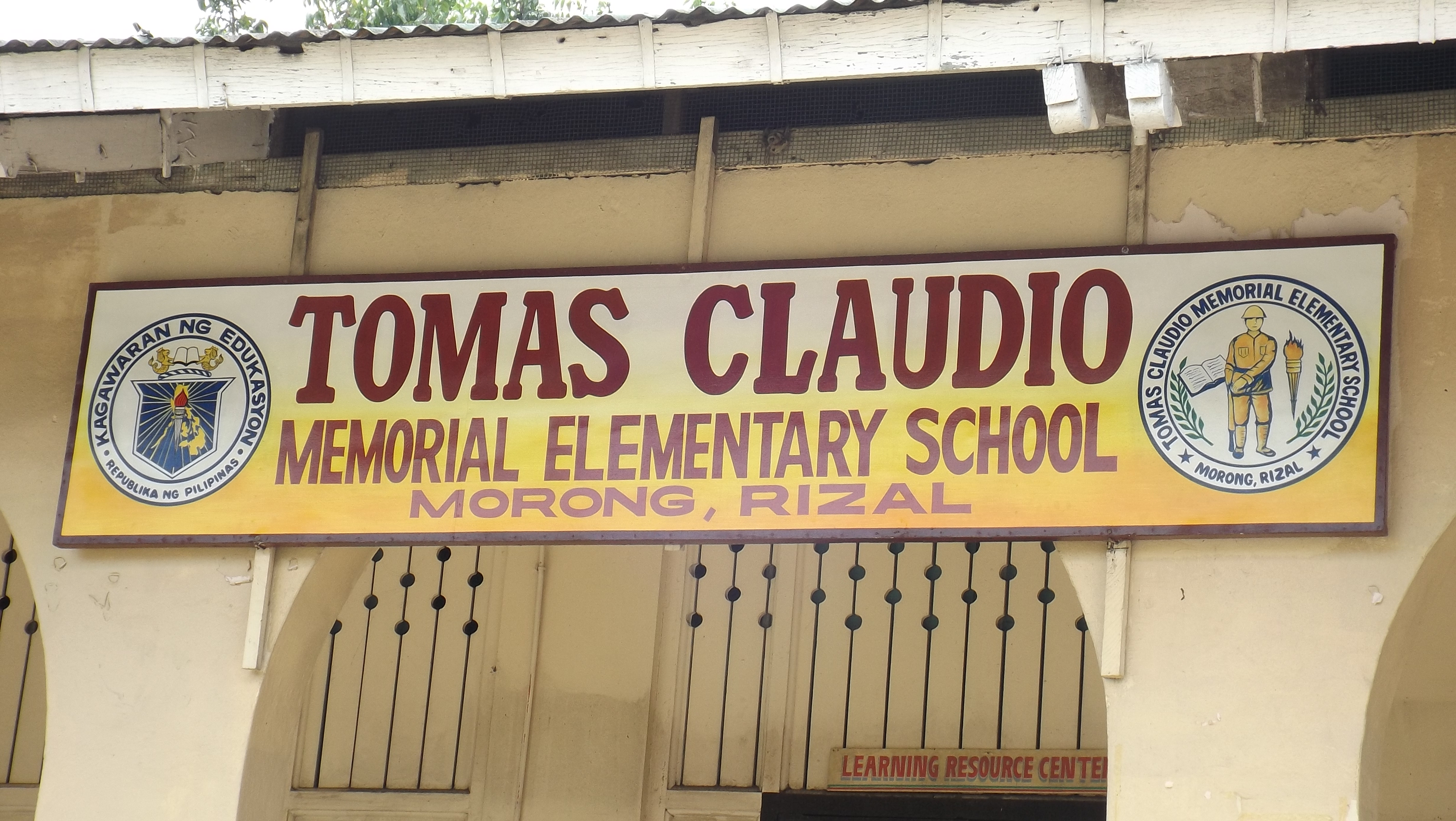
School Name

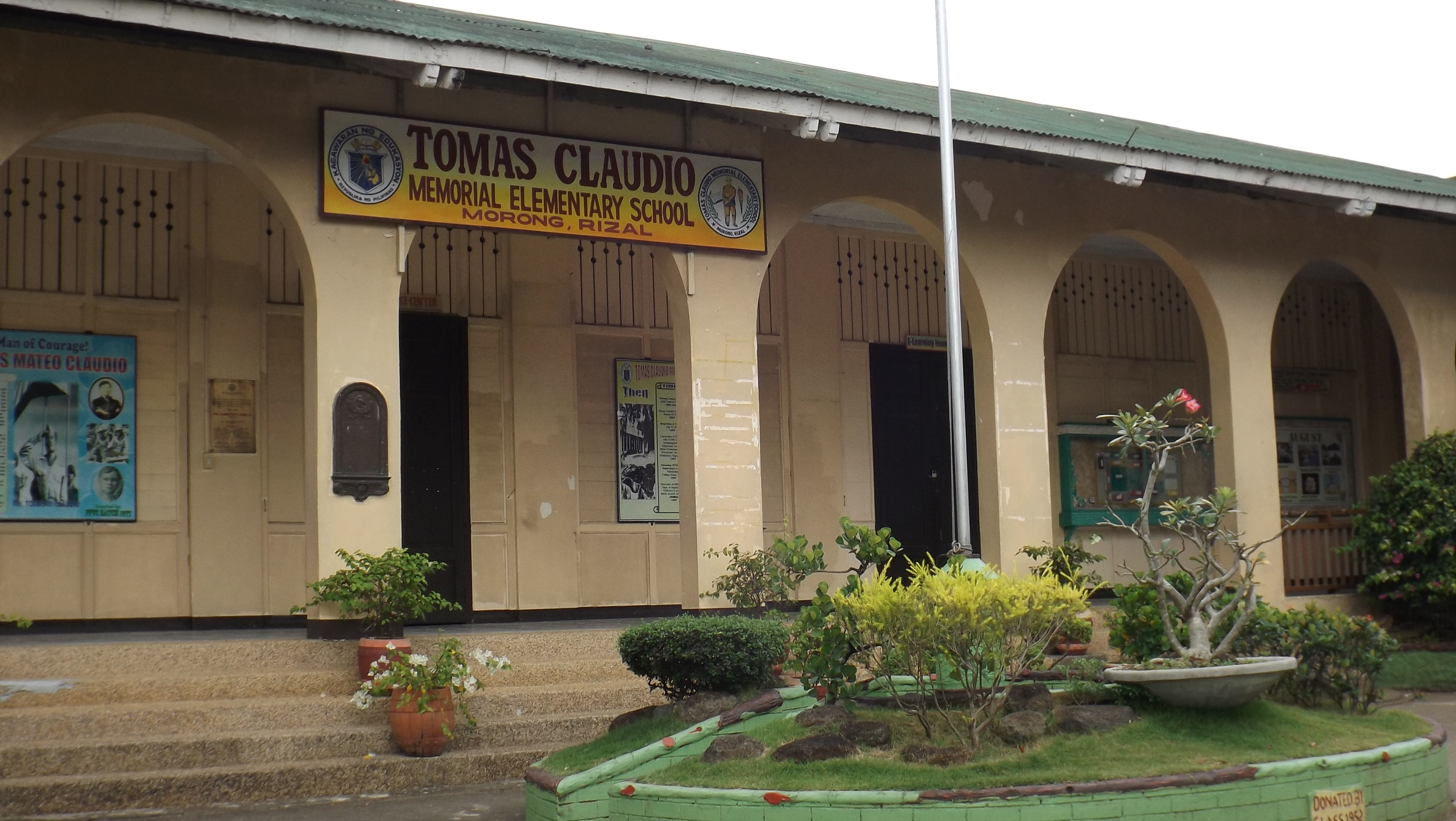
A closer look at the facade of the main building showing the arches and the fretworks on the upper wall

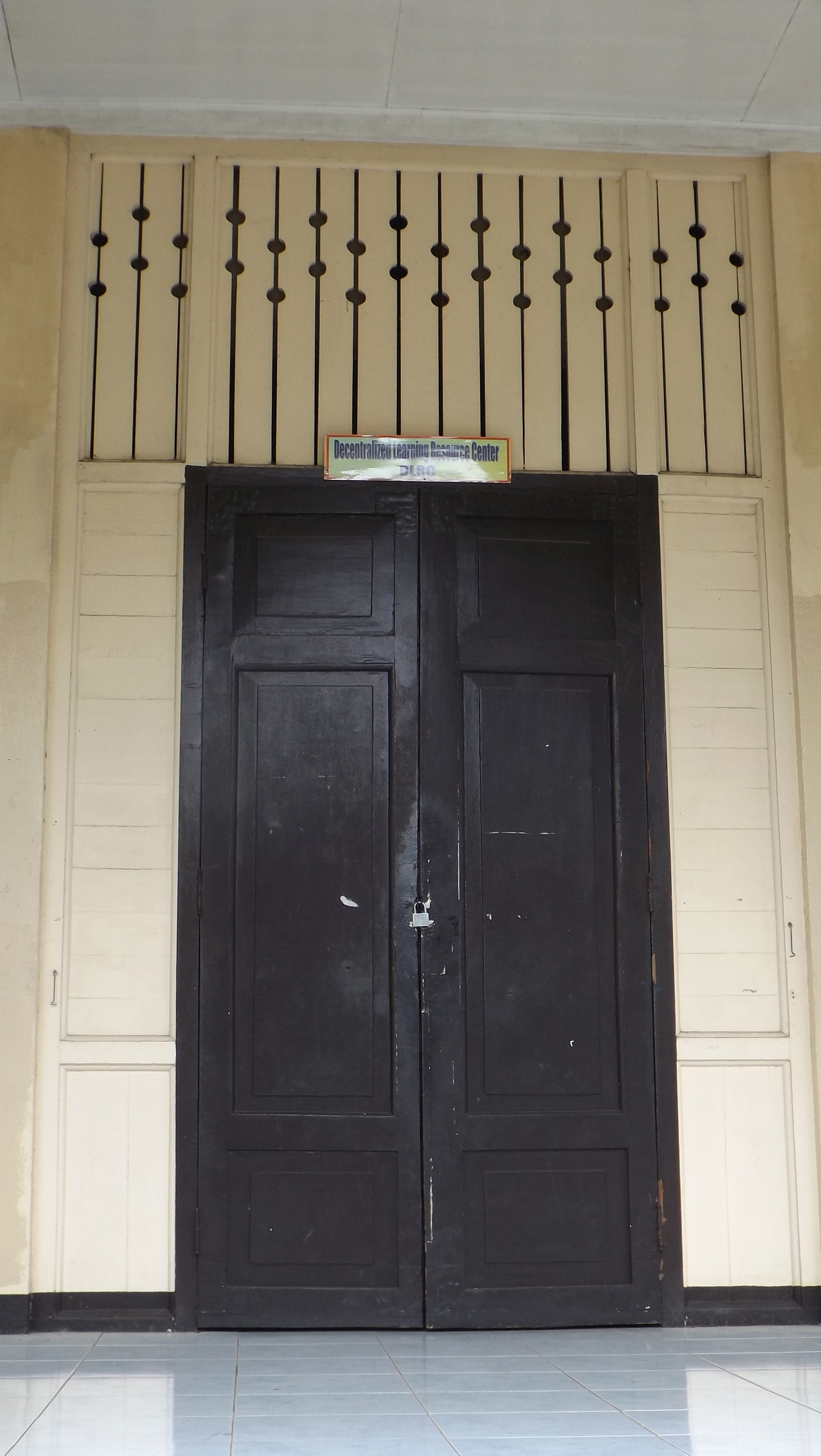
Double slab doors at the main building

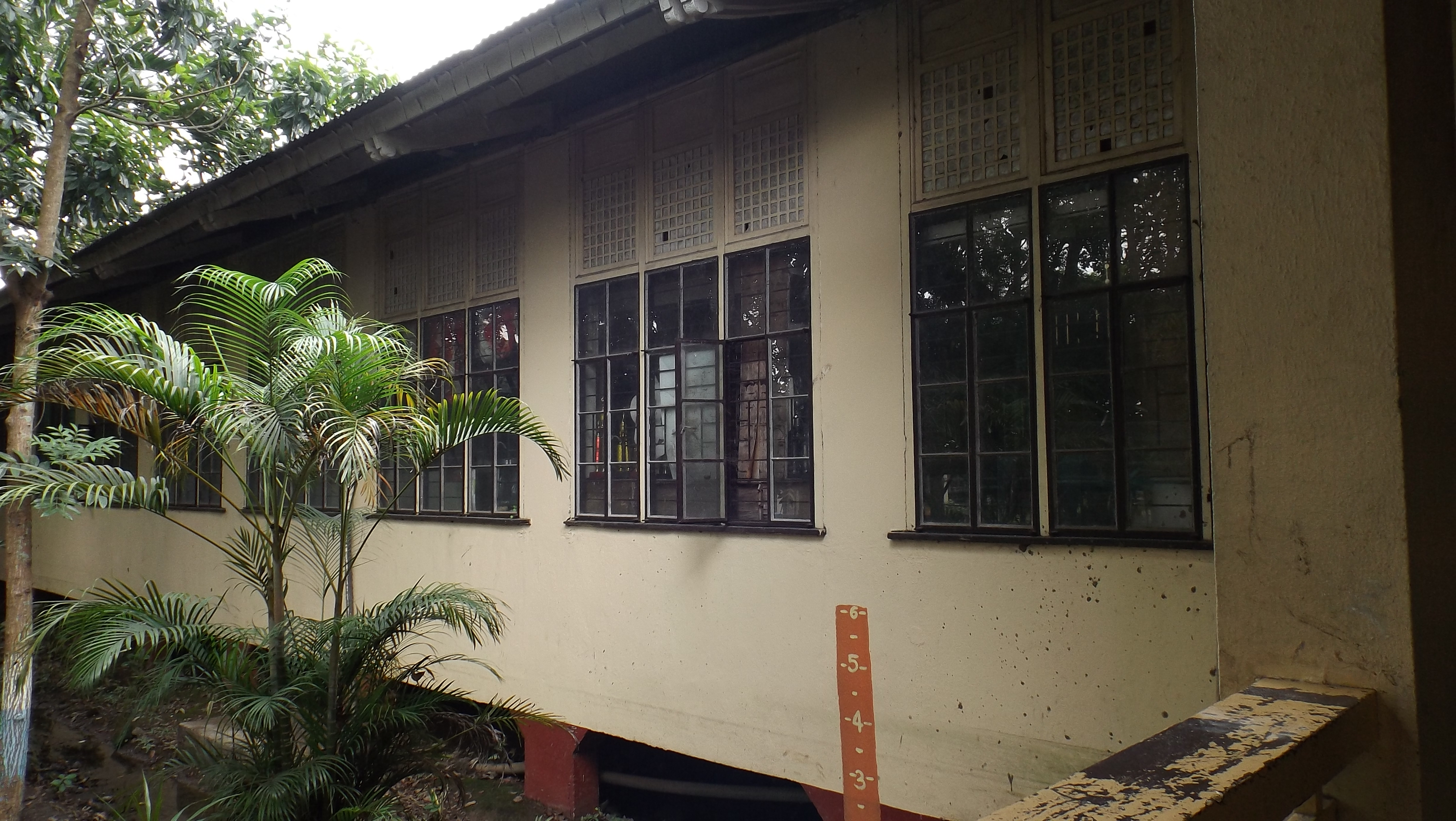
Rear side of the main building

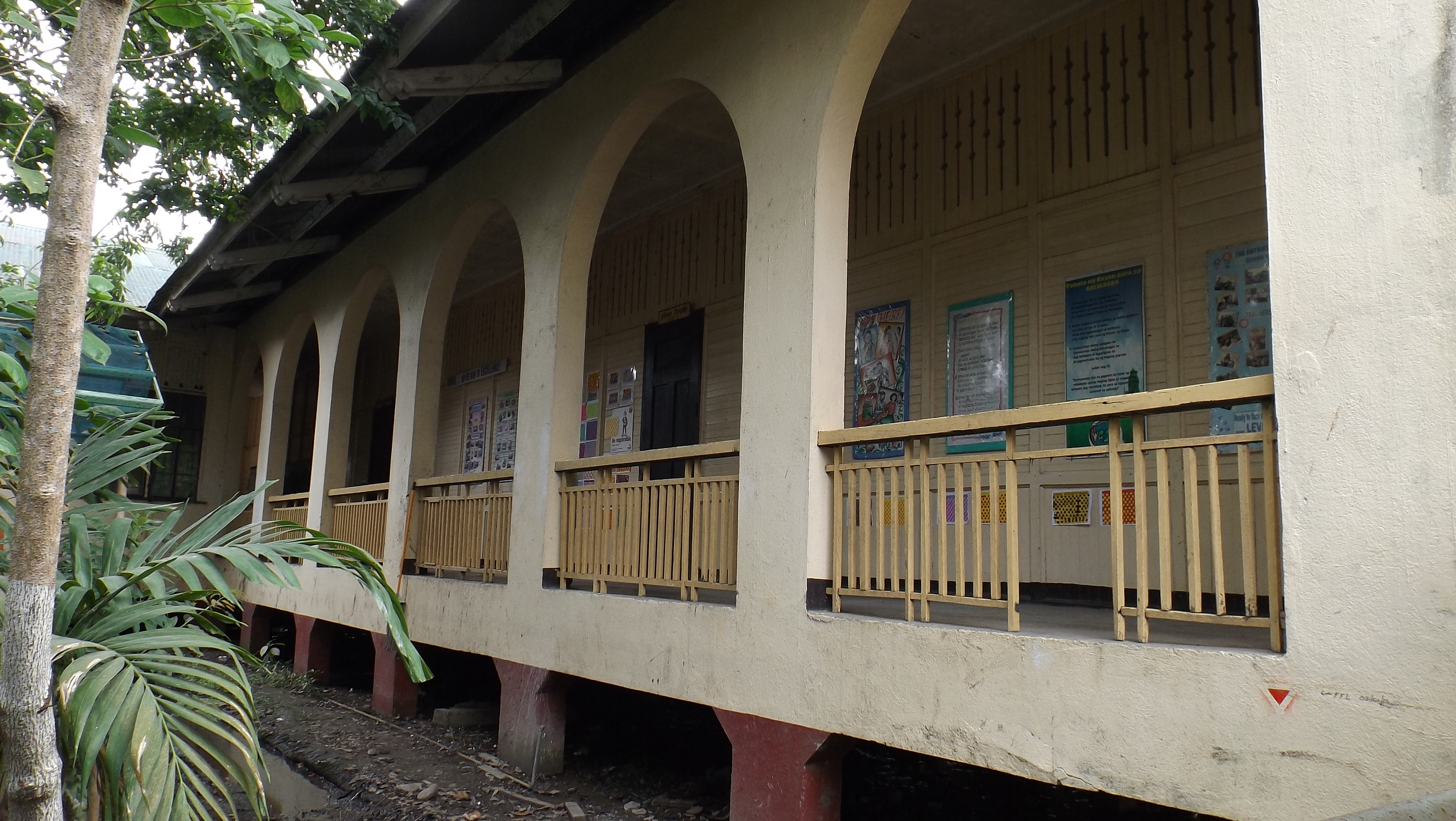
Facade of the northern wing of the building

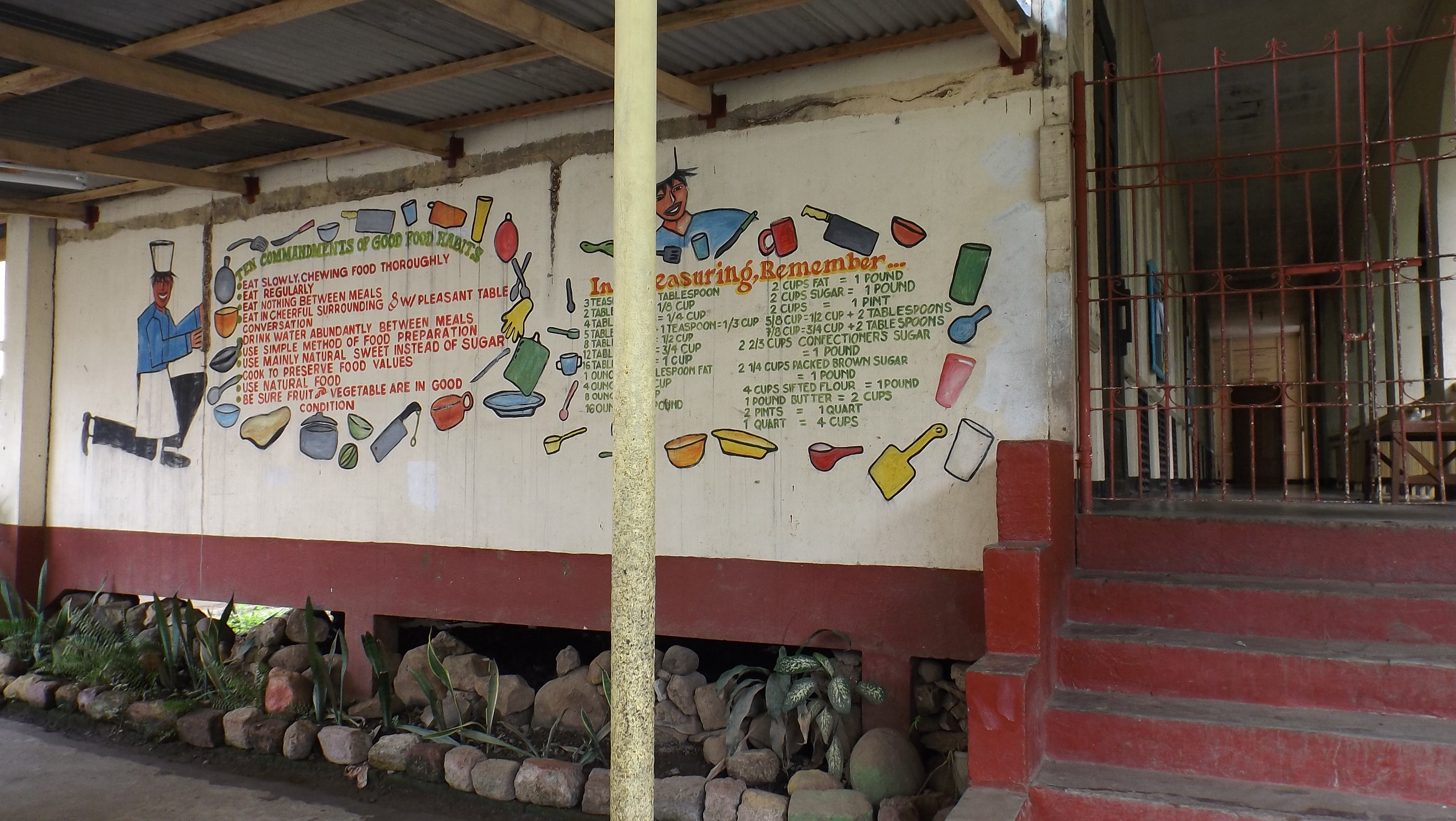
Rear side of the northern wing of the building

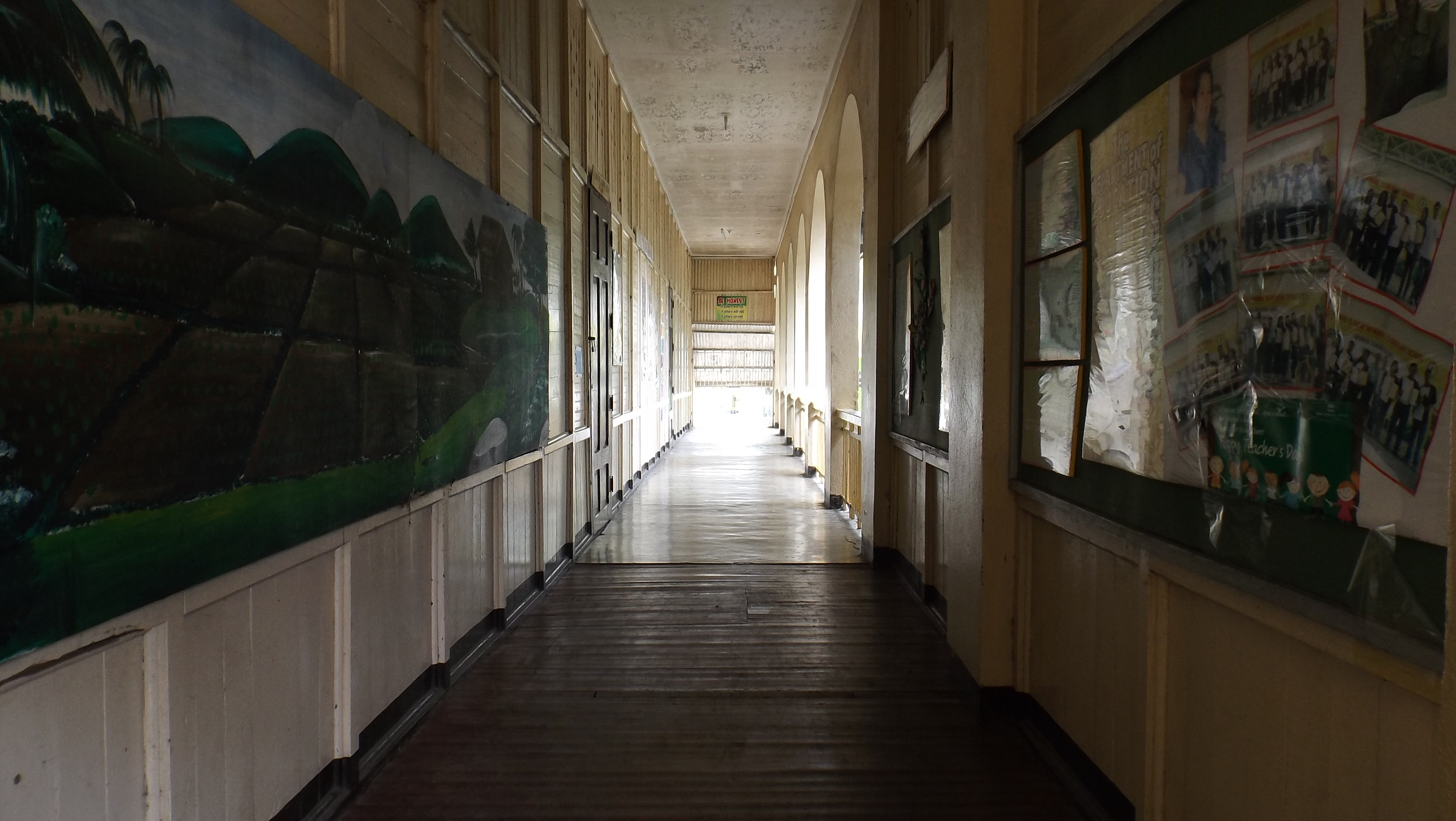
The corridor of the south wing with original wooden flooring

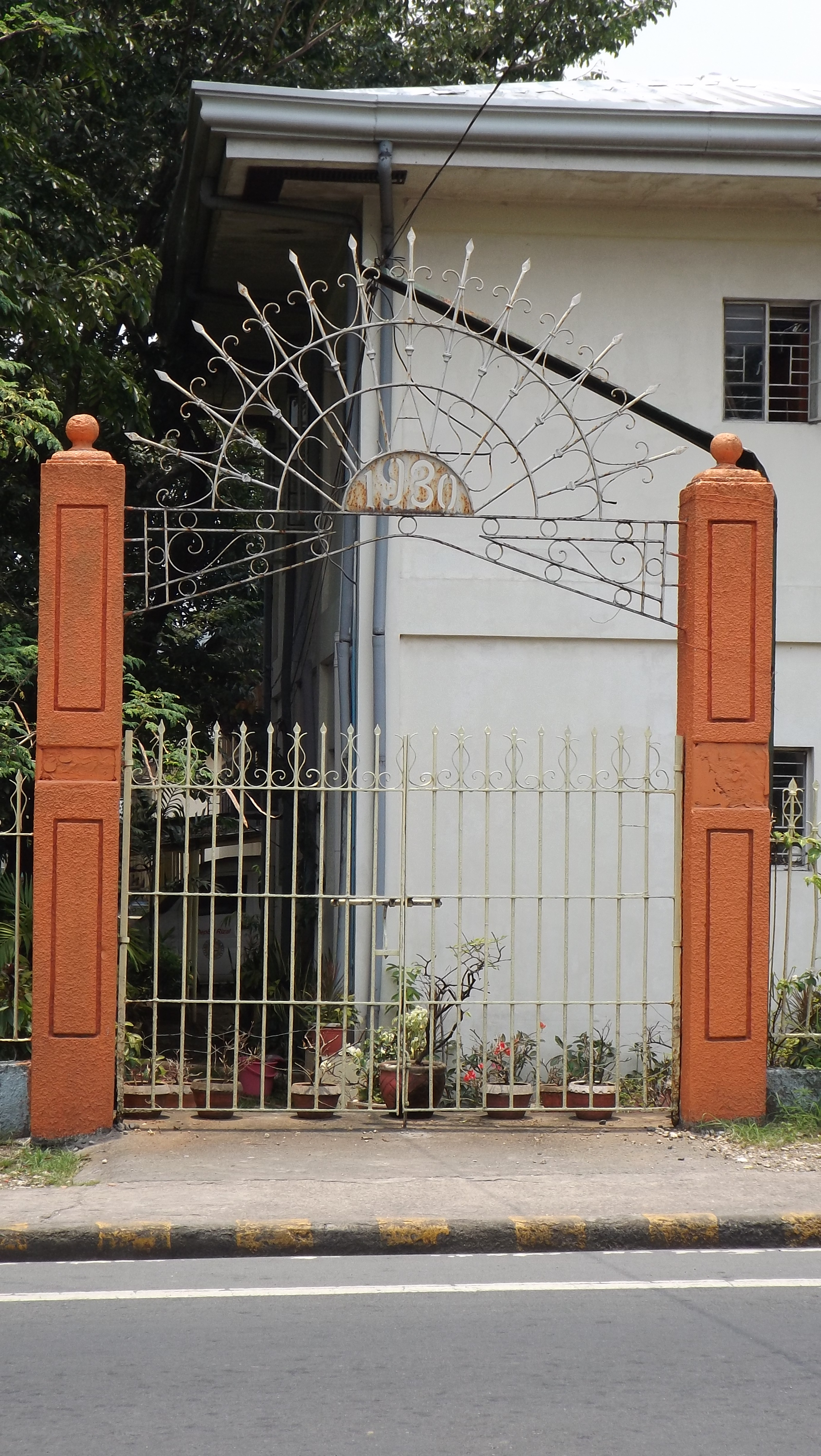
Gate made of metal grills bearing the 1930 insignia
