= Urbain Wallet =

French footballer (1899-1973)

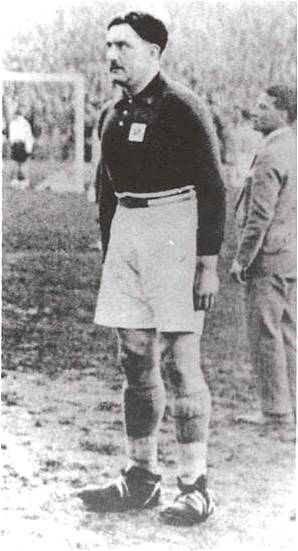
- Wallet in the 1920s

Personal information
- Full name: Urbain Edmond Alfred Charles Wallet
- Date of birth: 3 July 1899
- Place of birth: Montdidier, Somme, France
- Date of death: 9 December 1973 (aged 74)
- Place of death: Belloy-sur-Somme, France
- Position: Defender

Senior career*
Years	Team	Apps	(Gls)
1916–1932	Amiens		
- * Club domestic league appearances and goals

Urbain Edmond Alfred Charles Wallet (3 July 1899 – 9 December 1973) was a French footballer who played as a defender.

== Biography ==
Born in Montdidier, Somme, he spent his entire club career from 1916 to 1932 at Amiens SC.

Wallet earned 21 caps for the France national football team. His debut came on 22 March 1925 in a 7–0 friendly defeat to Italy in Turin. All of his caps were in friendlies apart from the 18th on 29 May 1928, in a 4–3 defeat to Italy at the Olympics in Amsterdam. He died in Belloy-sur-Somme.
