= John H. Ahern =

British railway modeller and photographer (1903–1961)

John H. Ahern FRPS
- Born: John Henry Ahern; 9 July 1903
- Died: 24 December 1961 (aged 58)
- Occupations: Modeller; Photographer; Insurance broker
- Notable work: Madder Valley
- Spouse: Gladys Mary Widdowson (m. 1926)

John Henry Ahern FRPS (9 July 1903 – 24 December 1961) was a British model railway enthusiast, photographer and writer.

== Career Overview ==
He is considered a pioneer of scenic model railways and one of the first to place a model railway within a landscape. The magazine Railway Modeller described Ahern's impact on the hobby as "fundamental and far-reaching". His 4mm layout, Madder Valley, built in the 1930s is preserved at the Pendon Museum in Oxfordshire.

Ahern was also an avid photographer alongside his wife Gladys. In 1932 he was elected a fellow of the Royal Photographic Society. His work published in the Society's catalogues, such as The Year's Photography, and was regularly exhibited there from the 1930s to the early 1940s. His photography was also published in Photograms of the Year.

== Books ==
- Photographing Models. London: P. Marshall & Co. 1946.
- Miniature Building Construction. London: P. Marshall & Co. 1947.
- Miniature Locomotive Construction. London: P. Marshall & Co. 1948.
- Miniature Landscape Modelling. London: P. Marshall & Co. 1951.
- Handbook of Two-Rail for "OO". London: Hambling's.
