= Jean Capperonnier =

French classical scholar (1716–1775)

Jean Capperonnier (1716, Montdidier, Somme – 1775) was a French classical scholar.

He succeeded his uncle Claude Capperonnier, also a distinguished scholar, as the Greek chair at the Collège de France. He published valuable editions of classical authors including Caesar, Anacreon, Plautus, and Sophocles. In 1770, he was named to the Académie des Inscriptions et Belles-Lettres.

He was a close friend of Diderot's, and he is mentioned often in the correspondence between the Abbé Galiani and Mme d'Epinay.
