= Gilles de Roye =

Flemish chronicler (d. 1478)

Gilles de Roye (or Egidius de Roya) (died 1478) was a Flemish chronicler. He was probably born at Montdidier in the modern French department of Somme, and became a Cistercian monk.

He was afterwards professor of theology in Paris and abbot of the monastery of Royaumont at Asnières-sur-Oise, retiring about 1458 to the convent of Notre Dame des Dunes (Ten Duinen) at Koksijde, near Veurne, and devoting his time to study. Gilles wrote the Chronicon Dunense or Annales Belgici, a résumé and continuation of the work of another monk, Jean Brandon (d. 1428), which deals with the history of Flanders, and also with events in Germany, Italy and England from 792 to 1478.

The Chronicle was published by FR Sweert in the Rerum Belgicarum annales (Frankfort, 1620); and the earlier part of it by C.B. Kervyn de Lettenhove in the Chroniques relatives a l'histoire de la Belgique (Brussels, 1870).
