= Roye England =

British modeller and museum curator

Roye England (11 September 1906 – 3 September 1995) was a British modeller and museum curator of Australian birth who founded the Pendon Museum.

== Life and career ==
Born and raised in Perth, Australia, Roye England visited Britain for the first time in 1925 at the age 19 when he developed a fascination with the British railway system and the English countryside and the architecture of traditional English country houses and buildings. He immigrated to Britain in his early 20s, settling in the Vale of White Horse near Swindon. Concerned with the impact new development was having on the traditional English country landscape and the changing face of English buildings as new more modern materials were being adopted, England began to build models of "the traditional face of rural England" in order to preserve its appearance in miniature. In 1931 he joined the London Model Railway Club; whom he convinced to assist in building an entire model English village. The project would be an on-going work for several decades; largely financed by England. Meticulous research for historical accuracy of landscapes and architecture was undertaken and documented by England; and his process became a standard for other similar projects.

A pacifist, England was a conscientious objector and spent World War II working on a farm in Somerset. In 1954 he moved to Long Wittenham near Didcot, Oxfordshire, England to establish a youth hostel, The Three Poplars, in an old abandoned pub in the village. The hostel served as a place to house and display his developing project, and he collected donations from those who stayed at the hostel. After the hostel closed, the project was threatened; but two friends of England purchased a home in what became the Pendon Museum. In 1961 the project officially became The Pendom Museum Trust, a registered charity. In succeeding years the museum began to draw crowds.

England served as curator of the Pendom Museum for many years; and was a member of its governing Council until 1992. In 1986 he was seriously injured in motor vehicle accident. He died in Newbury on 3 September 1995.
