= Montdidier, Somme =

Montdidier Mon(t)didji (Picard)
- Subprefecture and commune
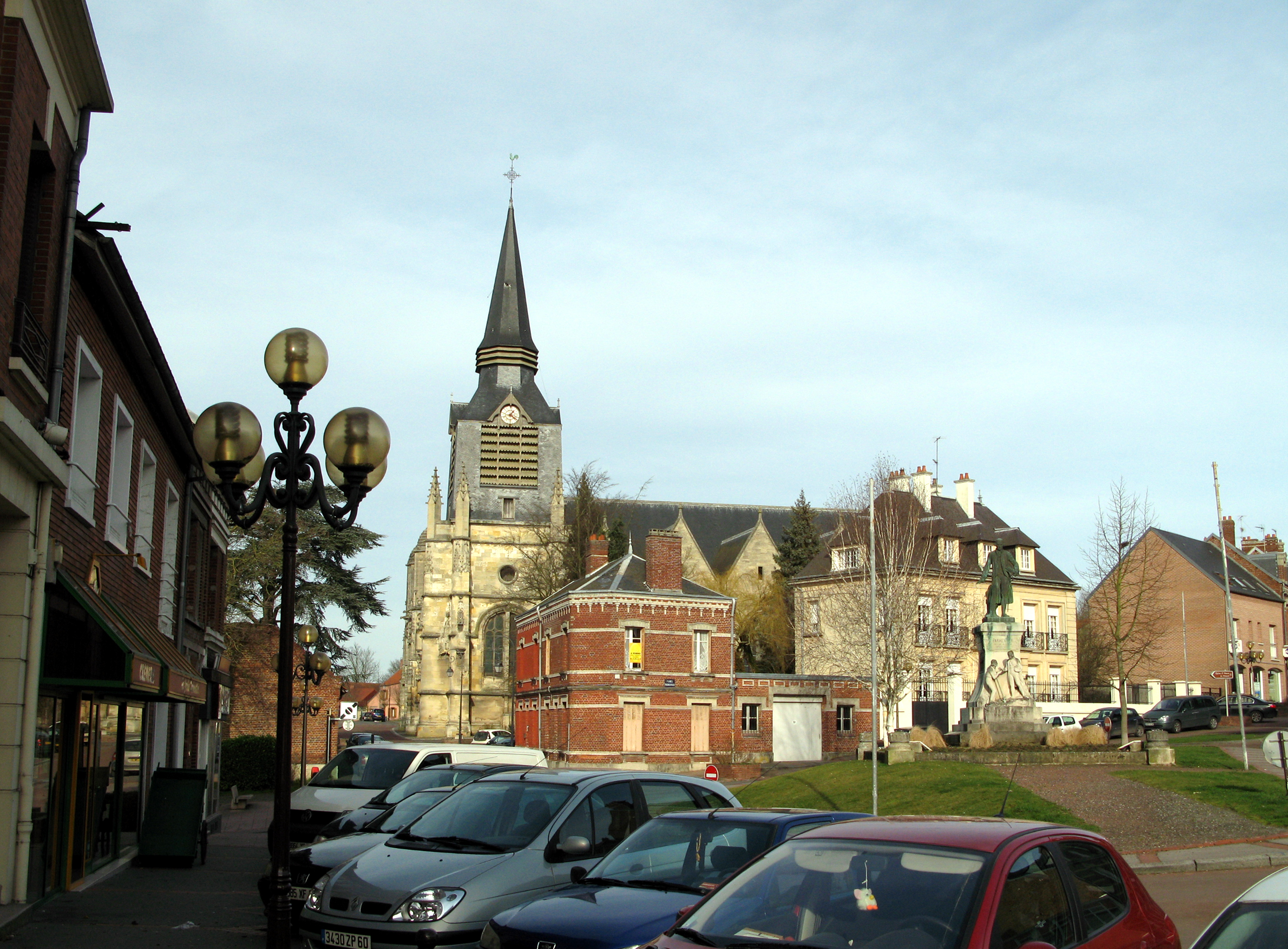
- The church in Montdidier

- Coat of arms
- Location of Montdidier
- Location within France Location within Hauts-de-France
- Coordinates: 49°38′55″N 2°34′15″E
- Country: France
- Region: Hauts-de-France
- Department: Somme
- Arrondissement: Montdidier
- Canton: Roye
- Intercommunality: CC Grand Roye

Government
  - Mayor (2020–2026): Catherine Quignon
- Area^{1}: 12.58 km^{2} (4.86 sq mi)
- Elevation: 97 m (318 ft)
- Highest elevation: 113 m (371 ft)
- Lowest elevation: 55 m (180 ft)
- Population (2023): 5,935
  - Density: 471.8/km^{2} (1,222/sq mi)
- Time zone: UTC+01:00 (CET)
  - Summer (DST): UTC+02:00 (CEST)
- INSEE/Postal code: 80561 /80500
- ^{1} French Land Register data, which excludes lakes, ponds, glaciers > 1 km^{2} (0.386 sq mi or 247 acres) and river estuaries.

Montdidier (French pronunciation: [mɔ̃didje]; Picard: Montdidji or Mondidji) is a commune in the Somme department in the administrative region of Hauts-de-France (historically Picardy), northern France.

== Geography ==
Montdidier is on the D935 road, some 30 km southeast of Amiens, in the region known as the 'Santerre'. Montdidier station has rail connections to Amiens and Compiègne.

== Population ==
Historical population

Year	Pop.	±% p.a.
1901	4,437	—
1906	4,443	+0.03%
1911	4,517	+0.33%
1921	3,565	−2.34%
1926	4,706	+5.71%
1931	4,305	−1.77%
1936	4,278	−0.13%
1946	4,399	+0.28%
1954	4,557	+0.44%
1962	5,430	+2.22%

Year	Pop.	±% p.a.
1968	5,828	+1.19%
1975	6,204	+0.90%
1982	6,194	−0.02%
1990	6,262	+0.14%
1999	6,328	+0.12%
2007	6,012	−0.64%
2012	6,174	+0.53%
2017	6,255	+0.26%
2023	5,935	−0.87%

Source: EHESS and INSEE

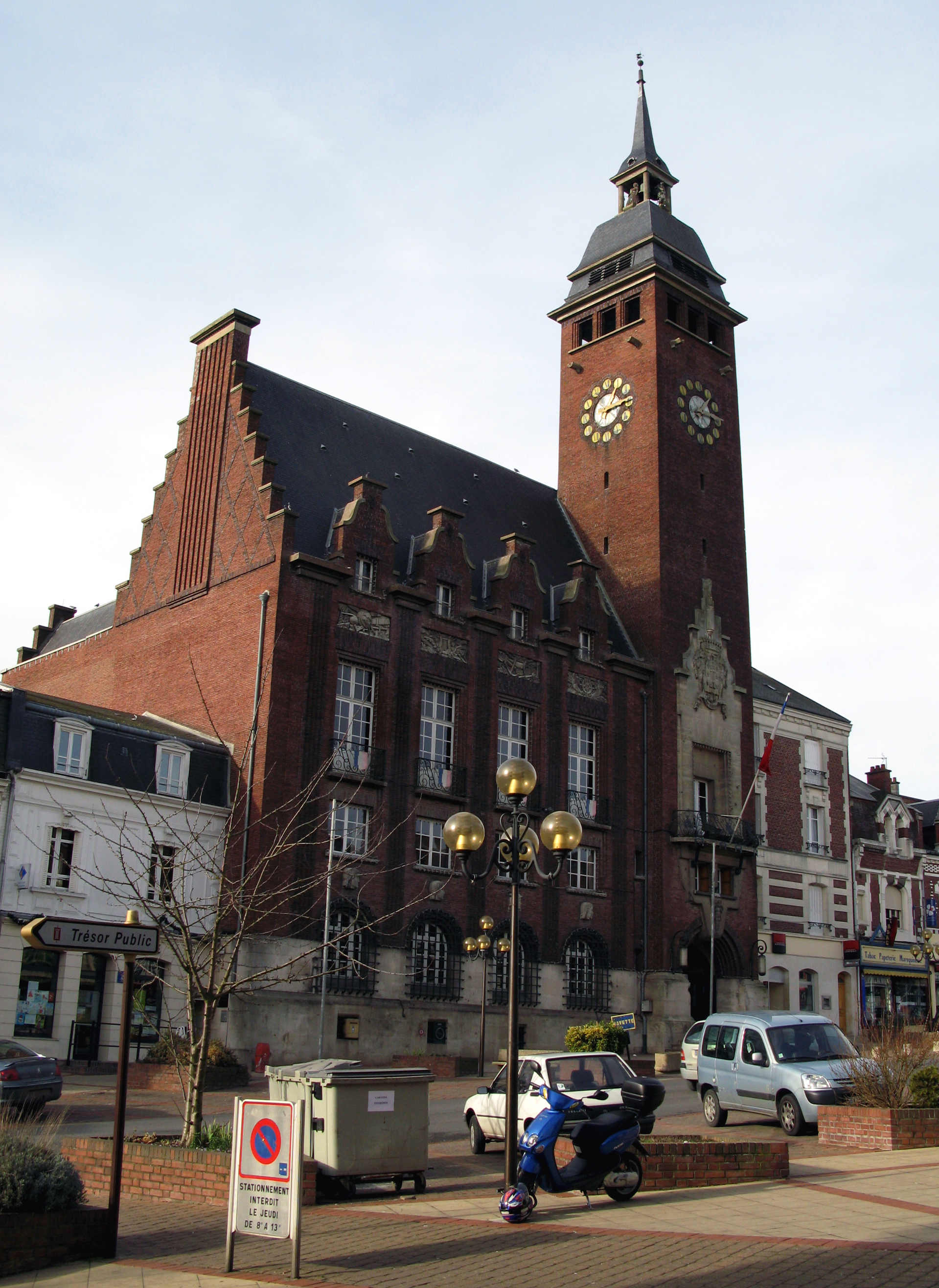
The Town hall with its 48 m-high belfry

== History ==
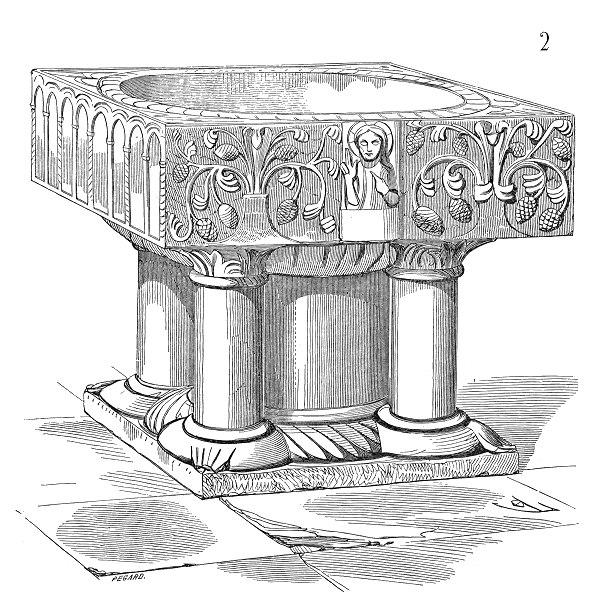
Baptismal fonts

The commune has existed since before Roman times, possibly corresponding to the site of Bratuspance.

Under Charlemagne, a donjon was built in the north-west of the town, on a chalk promontory, (nowadays the site of the Prieuré). It was here, in 774, that Desiderius, king of the Lombards, was held prisoner by Charlemagne, giving the town its name (in French, Didier).

Around the year 948, the first church was built near the castle by Hersende of Ramerupt, the wife of Hilduin I, of the house of the Counts of Montdidier.

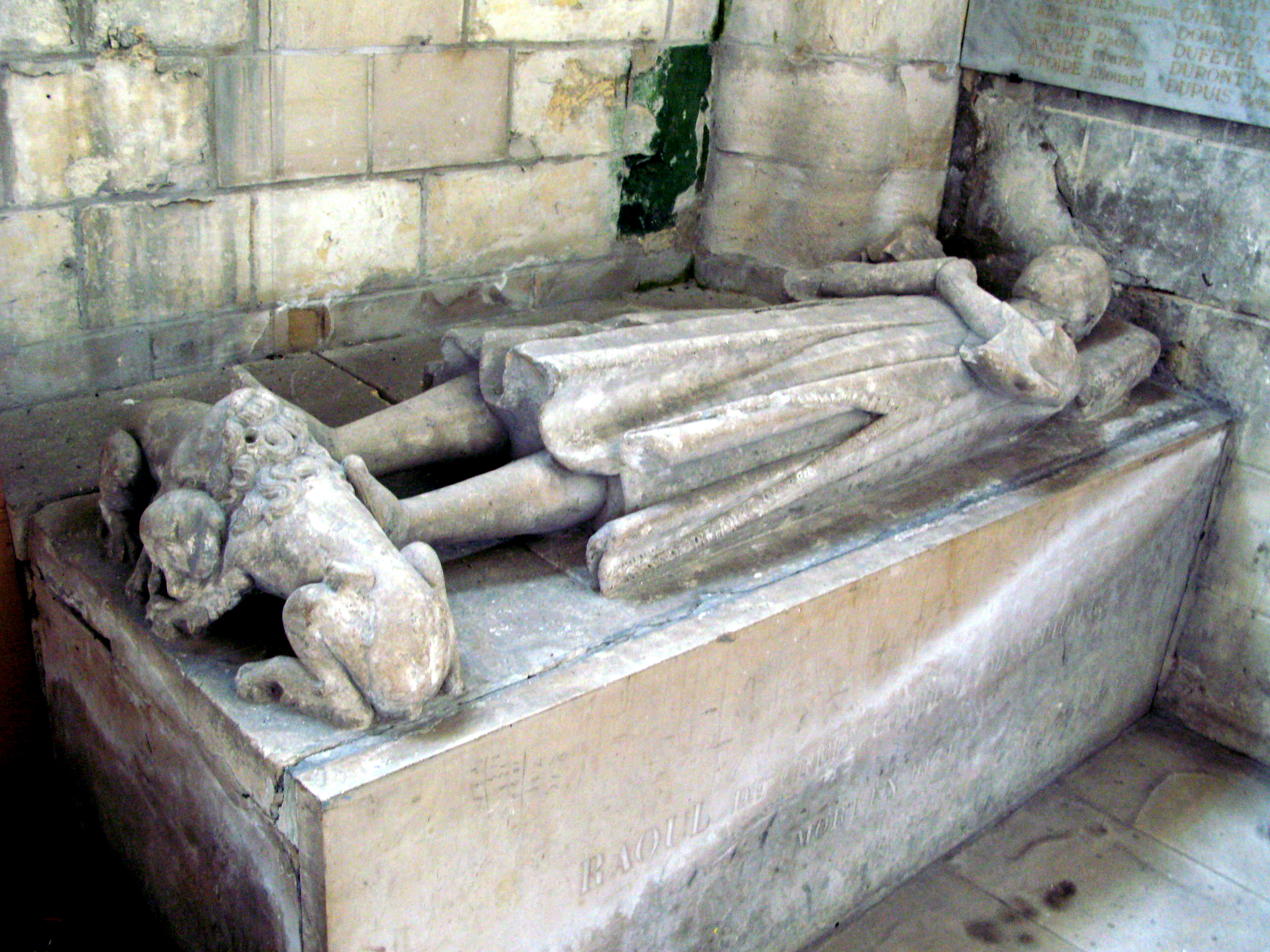
Empty tomb of Raoul de Crépy

In 1184, King Philip II of France had the outlying buildings of the town burnt down, during the war for the possession of the Amiénois and the Vermandois. In 1195, the town was granted its communal charter.

In 1472, Montdidier was set alight by the Burgundians. Charles the Bold is reported to have said "Such are the fruits of war".

Under the Ancien Régime, Montdidier was in the province of the Santerre (one of eight provinces of Picardy) and the seat of a bailiwick (established in 1516)
By edict of 1575, Henry III of France created the élection of Montdidier, granting tax-raising powers to elected representatives.

The year 1590 saw the commune threatened and eventually invaded by the troops of Henry IV of France.

As with many towns of the region, Montdidier bore the brunt of the fighting of World War I. Many of the town's more ancient and valuable monuments were destroyed in that occasion.

== Main sights ==
- Church of Saint-Sépulcre in flamboyant gothic, with six 17th century Reydams tapestries on show in the nave
- Church of St Peter (flamboyant gothic)
- Ruins of Saint-Martin's church
- Statue of Antoine-Augustin Parmentier on Parmentier Place
- The town hall, in the Flemish style and decorated in Art Deco style
- The priory (once known as the Salle du Roy). Rebuilt in 1930, after being damaged during World War I. It has functioned as the Palais de Justice and became the Centre des Impôts in 1965.
- The war memorial
- Monument to the 212 French pilots who lost their lives in Picardy in May and June 1940

== Personalities ==
- Fredegund (c.545–597), Queen of Neustria
- Felicia of Roucy (c.1060–1123), Queen of Aragon
- Gilles de Roye (died 1478), Cistercian monk
- Jean Fernel (1497–1558), physician
- Claude Capperonnier (1671–1744), philosopher
- Jean Capperonnier (1716–1775), philosopher and librarian
- Antoine-Augustin Parmentier (1737–1813), agriculturist
- Jean-Jacques-Antoine Caussin de Perceval (1759–1835), linguist
- Cléon Galoppe d'Onquaire (1805–1867), writer and playwright
- Louis-Lucien Klotz (1868–1930), journalist and politician
- Maurice Blanchard (1890–1960), aeronautic engineer and poet
- Urbain Wallet (1899–1973), footballer
- Jimmy Casper (born 1978), cyclist

== See also ==
- Communes of the Somme department
- Raymond Couvègnes
