= Claude Capperonnier =

French classical scholar

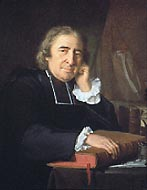
Claude Capperonnier

Claude Capperonnier (1 May 1671, Montdidier, Picardy – 1744), French classical scholar, the son of a tanner, was born at Montdidier. Though destitute of a learned education, he attained a considerable knowledge of the Latin and Greek, of which last language he became professor at Paris. He studied at Amiens and Paris, and took orders in the Church of Rome, but devoted himself almost entirely to classical studies. He declined a professorship in the University of Basle, and was afterwards appointed (1722) to the Greek chair in the Collège de France.

He published an edition of Quintilian (1725) and left behind him at his death an edition of the ancient Latin Rhetoricians, which was published in 1756. He furnished much material for Robert Estienne's Thesaurus Linguae Latinae. He was also the author of an apology for Sophocles; and left many valuable manuscripts. He was succeeded in his professorship in 1716 by his nephew Jean Capperonnier, born also at Mondidier.

He published:

1. An edition of Joinville's History of St Lewis, folio.
2. An edition of Anacreon, 12mo.; Caesar, 2 vols.
3. Plautus, 3 vols.

His edition of Sophocles was printed at Paris in 1731, 2 vols.
